= Select Bus Service =

Bus service in New York City

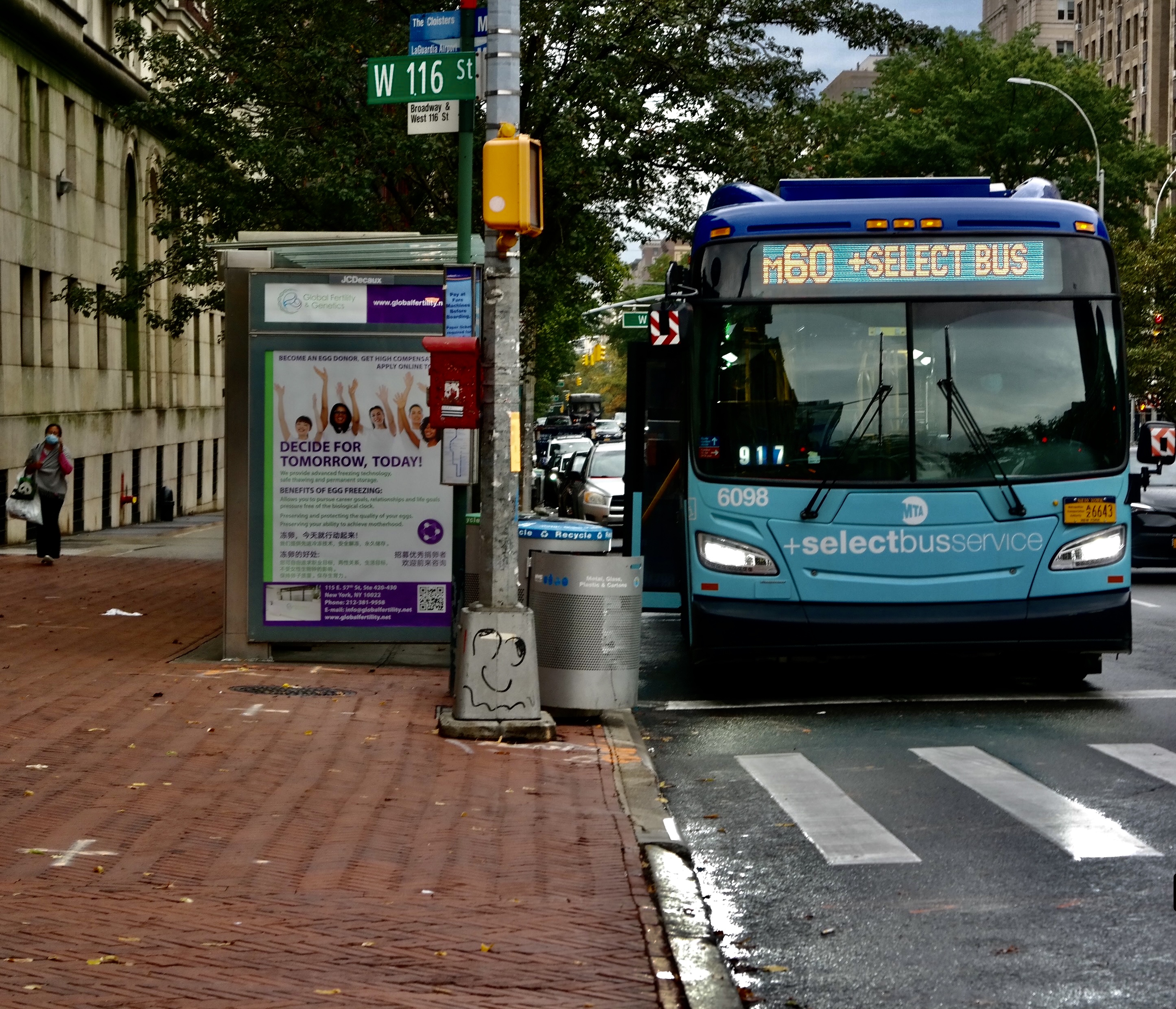
- An M60 Select Bus Service bus operates through Morningside Heights, bound for LaGuardia Airport.
- Founded: 2008
- Locale: New York City
- Service type: Limited-stop, with some bus rapid transit features
- Routes: 20 routes, 17 corridors (3 proposed routes)
- Destinations: Bronx (3 routes); Bx6: Washington Hts. – Hunts Pt. Bx12: Inwood – Bay Plaza; Bx41: The Hub – Williamsbridge; Brooklyn (3 routes); B44: Williamsburg – Sheepshead Bay; B46: Bedford-Stuyvesant – Kings Plaza; B82: Spring Creek – Bath Beach; Manhattan (9 routes); M14A: Abingdon Sq – Lower East Side; M14D: Chelsea Piers – Lower East Side; M15: East Harlem – South Ferry; M23: Chelsea Piers – East Side; M34: Javits Center – East Side; M34A: PABT – Waterside Plaza; M60: UWS – LGA Airpt. M79: UWS – UES; M86: UWS – Yorkville; Queens (4 routes); Q44: Bronx Zoo – Jamaica; Q52: Elmhurst – Edgemere; Q53: Woodside – Rockaway Park; Q70: Woodside – LaGuardia Airport; Staten Island (1 route); S79: Staten Island Mall – Bay Ridge
- Stations: 261
- Fleet: New Flyer Xcelsior XD40/XD60/XN60; New Flyer Xcelsior CHARGE XE60; Nova Bus LFS (4th Generation)/LFS Artic (2nd Generation)
- Operator: MTA Bus & MTA New York City Bus
- Website: MTA website • DOT website

Select Bus Service (SBS; stylized as +selectbusservice) is a service provided by the Metropolitan Transportation Authority (MTA)'s Regional Bus Operations for limited-stop bus routes with some bus rapid transit features in New York City. The first SBS route was implemented in 2008 to improve speed and reliability on long, busy corridors.

SBS routes use vehicle-segregated, camera-enforced bus lanes; sidewalk extensions for bus stops; relatively long distances between stops; vehicular turn restrictions along corridors; and next-bus travel information screens. The first route was the Bx12 along Fordham Road and the Pelham Parkway; as of July 2019, the system has expanded to twenty SBS routes along seventeen corridors. Twenty more routes are proposed through 2027. In summer 2018, the MTA announced that it was considering delaying the implementation of SBS routes outside Manhattan until 2021 because of the city's upcoming bus-network redesign.

== History ==
In 2002, Schaller Consulting conducted a study on potential bus rapid transit services in New York City. In 2004, the MTA in conjunction with the New York City Department of Transportation and New York State Department of Transportation, performed an initial study on bus rapid transit, with 80 corridors studied citywide.

In late 2004, the MTA identified five corridors for implementation of bus rapid transit, one in each of the five boroughs: the Fordham Road/Pelham Parkway corridor in the Bronx, First Avenue and Second Avenue in Manhattan, Merrick Boulevard in Queens, Nostrand Avenue in Brooklyn, and Hylan Boulevard in Staten Island. Four bus priority corridors were identified for implementation or expansion (three in Manhattan, one in the Bronx): Madison Avenue (expansion), Fifth Avenue, 34th Street, and Webster Avenue. The Merrick Boulevard corridor was eventually scrapped because of community opposition related to loss of parking. The corridor is being considered again as part of the Bus Forward study in 2017.

The Select Bus Service program was unveiled to the public in March 2008. At the time of the announcement, the MTA and then-Mayor Michael Bloomberg had stated that implementation on other corridors was contingent on the passage of congestion pricing, which ultimately did not make it for a vote in the legislature.

Key features of bus rapid transit include dedicated lanes, alignment of lanes to reduce conflicts with other vehicles, frequent service, off-vehicle fare collection, sheltered stations, platform-level boarding, and intelligent transportation systems (ITS) features such as transit signal priority. A 2011 study by the Institute for Transportation and Development Policy (ITDP) determined that the SBS system was best classified as "Not BRT" because it lacked many of these BRT Standard features.

=== Corridors ===
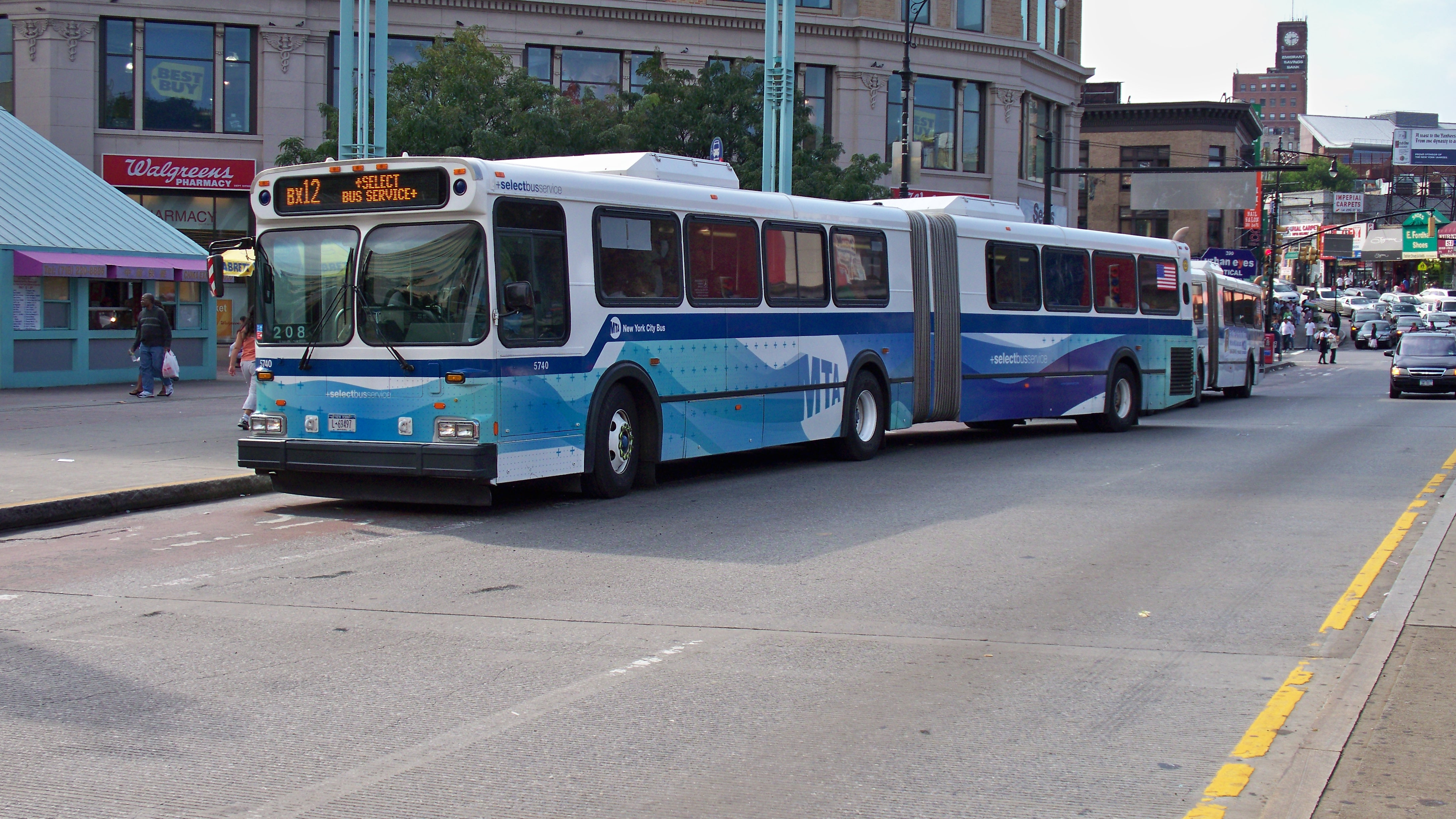
The Bx12 Select Bus Service in 2008, the first SBS route in New York City.

The first Select Bus Service corridor, on the Bx12 along 207th Street, Fordham Road, and Pelham Parkway, was placed into service on June 29, 2008. The next line, the M15, saw Select Service begin on October 10, 2010 after the delivery of new low-floor buses. The M34/M34A line was started on November 13, 2011. Initially, a 34th Street busway was planned that would require eliminating 34th Street as a through street, but it was dropped in favor of the standard SBS model.

The B44 Rogers/Bedford/Nostrand Avenues bus route, the fifth Select Bus Service corridor in the city, was implemented on November 17, 2013 after the arrival of new fare machines. The S79 Hylan Boulevard/Richmond Avenue route, initially slated to be converted to SBS in 2013, was moved up to September 2, 2012; the local equivalents of the S79 route are the S78 and S59 buses.

A sixth corridor, the second for the Bronx, began service on the Bx41 Webster Avenue route on June 30, 2013; this route was the first "Phase II" SBS route to begin service (the existing corridors plus the B44 comprise Phase I). Another Select Bus Service route on Webster Avenue, which will be extended to run between LaGuardia Airport and Fordham Plaza alongside the local Bx41 route, is proposed for later implementation.

A seventh corridor, and the third for Manhattan, the M60 125th Street–Triborough Bridge–Astoria Boulevard bus route to LaGuardia Airport, was converted to SBS on May 25, 2014; local service was replaced by other routes running alongside the route of the M60 (the M100, M101, Bx15, and Q19). An eighth Select Bus Service route was planned in the 2014–2017 Financial Plan. The eighth Select Bus Service corridor (ninth route overall), and the fourth in Manhattan, was for the M86 running on 86th Street, which was originally scheduled to start running on June 28, 2015, but pushed back to July 13, 2015; it did not include a major change in stops.

The ninth corridor, and the second for Brooklyn, is the B46 on Utica Avenue. When implemented, the local and Select Bus Service route of the B46 changed northern terminals to improve reliability. Originally planned for implementation in fall 2015, it was instituted on July 3, 2016. The tenth corridor, and the first for Queens, is the Q44 limited bus route running on East 177th Street (the Cross Bronx Expressway service road) and Main Street, which began on November 29, 2015. Selected stops in the Bronx were combined into much busier stops for faster service, and some stops in Queens have been replaced by the Q20A/B local routes. As both the Q20 branches do not enter the Bronx and the Q44 ran local late nights only, the Q44 gained 24/7 SBS service between the Bronx Zoo and Jamaica. The Q20A replaced the Q44 local in Queens late nights.

In September 2016, the eleventh corridor (twelfth route overall) and the second for Queens, the Q70, was rebranded as the "LaGuardia Link" and became a SBS route. As opposed to other SBS routes, the Q70 is wrapped in a light blue scheme with clouds and airplanes in order to encourage more people to use public transportation when using the airport. This marked MTA Bus's first SBS route, as well as the second for Queens and the eleventh overall. The M23, the twelfth corridor (thirteenth route) and the fifth in Manhattan, became a Select Bus Service route on November 6, 2016 with dedicated bus lanes and countdown clocks at some stops, replacing M23 local service at the cost of $1.7 million.

The M79 became an SBS route in May 2017, with the installation of bus lanes along its route. The Bx6, after the completion of bus lanes and widened sidewalks, became an SBS route in September 2017. It supplements the local service by stopping at high ridership stops. This is the third route for the Bronx. Select Bus Service along Woodhaven and Cross Bay Boulevards was implemented on the Q52 and Q53 routes in November 2017.

Select Bus Service along Kings Highway was implemented on the B82, which replaced the former Limited-Stop route, on October 1, 2018. The city subsequently announced that following the implementation of the B82 SBS, it would halt the implementation of Select Bus Service in the outer boroughs until 2021 as a result of budget cuts, and an upcoming redesign of the city's bus network.

A temporary M14 Select Bus Service route was proposed for implementation in early 2019, in preparation for the 14th Street Tunnel shutdown. This route would have run between Tenth Avenue and Stuyvesant Cove Ferry, with local service on the M14A and M14D. Five additional temporary routes would have been implemented for the shutdown in April 2019. However, on January 3, 2019, the shutdown plan was altered by Governor Andrew Cuomo and the proposed SBS routes were put on hold. In February 2019, the MTA announced plans to implement SBS on the M14A and M14D, and has since been implemented on July 1, 2019.

All current SBS corridors are enforced by cameras restricting non-buses in these lanes on weekdays where the bus lane is curbside, with the bus lanes marked by red paint. Where the bus lane is an offset lane (that is, one lane away from the curb), non-bus traffic is restricted at all times except for emergencies.

== Current routes ==
Currently, SBS operates twenty different bus lines on seventeen different corridors.

By order of implementation, SBS was placed on the Bx12, M15, M34, M34A, S79, Bx41, B44, M60, M86, Q44, B46, Q70, M23, M79, Bx6, Q52, Q53, B82, M14A, and M14D routes.

SBS replaced nearly-identical limited-stop service on the Bx12, M15, Bx41, B44, Q44, B46, Q70, Q52, Q53, and B82 where corresponding local bus service still operates (except on the Q44, whose nighttime local variant was eliminated and replaced with the full-time SBS route, and the Q70, which had no local equivalent before the conversion). The Bx6 SBS was split from the Bx6 local, which had no limited-stop variant prior to SBS implementation on that route. The B46 SBS omitted the Broadway section of the LTD route, while the B82 SBS did not replace service along the original B82 LTD portion between Bay 37th St and Coney Island.

For the other routes, all service was converted from local to SBS, and numerous local stops were combined or omitted. The Bx12, M15, M34, M34A, S79, Bx41, B44, B46, Bx6, and Q52 routes run the whole day, while the M60, M86, Q44, Q70, M23, M79, Q53, M14A, and M14D routes run at all times. The B82 is the first and only SBS line to not run on late nights and weekends.

=== Bx12 ===
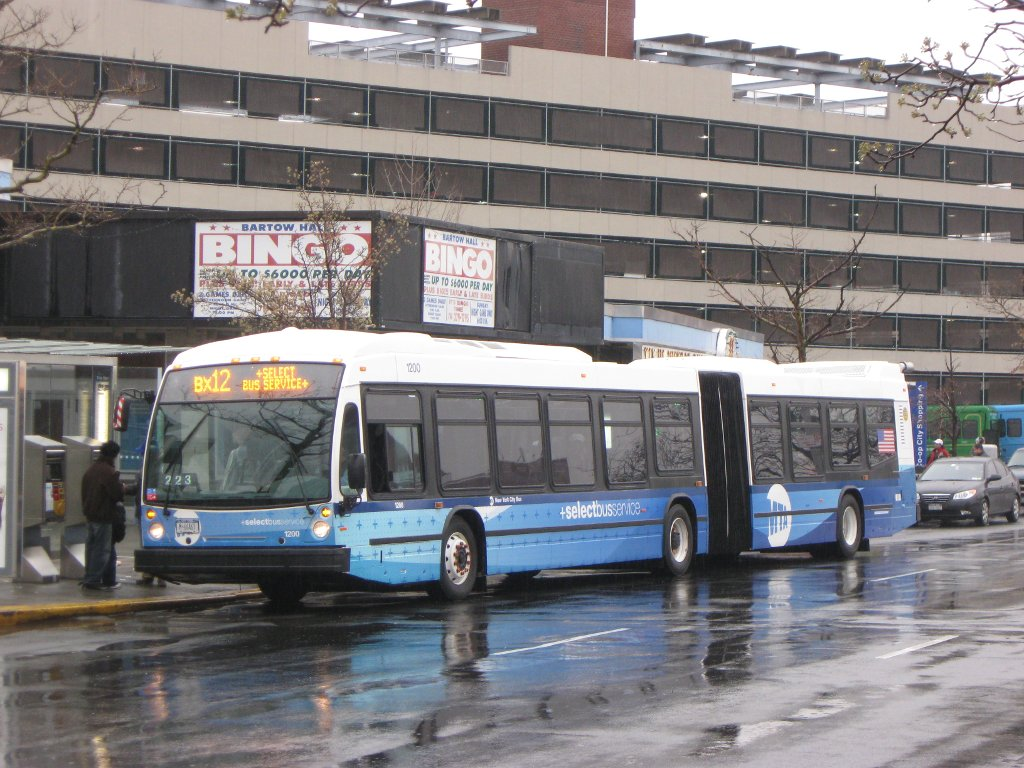
A bus on the Bx12 SBS route

The Bx12 Limited was the first route to be converted into a Select Bus Service line, the Bx12 SBS. It was placed into service in June 2008 replacing limited stop service with SBS on this line. Both Bx12 Select Bus Service and Bx12 local are based at the Gun Hill Bus Depot. During late nights, the corridor is served by the Bx12 local service, which operates 24/7.

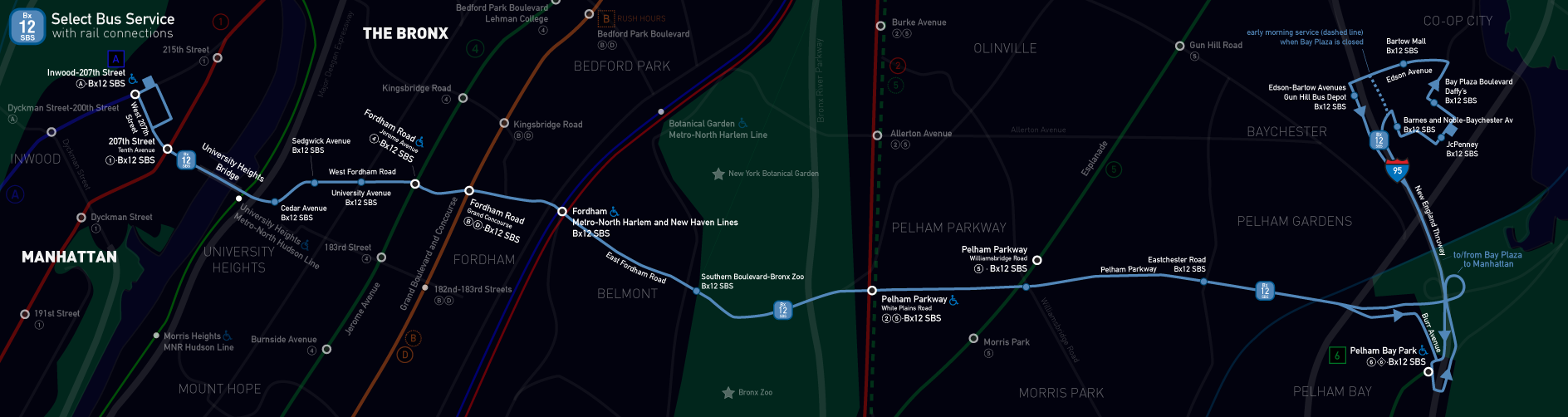
A geographically correct map of the Bx12 Select Bus Service route, showing all stations and connections. The route is in light blue.

Station Street traveled	Direction	Connections
Manhattan
West 207th / Isham Streets Broadway	Westbound terminus, eastbound station	NYC Bus: Bx7, Bx20; MTA Bus: BxM1; NYC Subway: train at Inwood–207th Street
Tenth Avenue West 207th Street	Bidirectional	NYC Bus: M100; NYC Subway: train at 207th Street
University Heights Bridge
The Bronx
Cedar Avenue West Fordham Road	Bidrectional	Metro-North: Hudson Line at University Heights (one block west at Major Deegan Expressway)
Sedgwick Avenue West Fordham Road (Note: Sedgwick Avenue stop added in January 2009.)	Bidrectional	NYC Bus: Bx12 Local
University Avenue West Fordham Road	Bidrectional	NYC Bus: Bx3, Bx12 Local
Jerome / Walton Avenues East Fordham Road	Bidrectional	NYC Bus: Bx12 Local, Bx32; NYC Subway: train at Fordham Road
Grand Concourse / Valentine Avenue East Fordham Road	Bidrectional	NYC Bus: Bx1, Bx2, Bx12 Local, Bx22, Bx34; Bee-Line: 62; NYC Subway: trains at Fordham Road
Webster and Third Avenues Fordham Plaza / Fordham University East Fordham Road	Bidrectional	NYC Bus: Bx9, Bx12 Local, Bx15, Bx17, Bx22, Bx41 Local, Bx41 SBS; Metro-North: Harlem and New Haven lines at Fordham; Bee-Line: 60, 61, 62
Southern Boulevard Bronx Zoo / Botanical Garden East Fordham Road	Bidrectional	NYC Bus: Bx9, Bx12 Local, Bx19, Bx22; Bee-Line: 60, 61, 62
White Plains Road Pelham Parkway	Bidrectional	MTA Bus: BxM11; NYC Bus: Bx12 Local, Bx30, Bx39; NYC Subway: trains at Pelham Parkway; Bee-Line: 60, 61, 62
Williamsbridge Road Pelham Parkway	Bidrectional	NYC Bus: Bx8, Bx12 Local; NYC Subway: train at Pelham Parkway
Eastchester Road Jacobi Medical Center Pelham Parkway	Bidrectional	NYC Bus: Bx12 Local, Bx31; MTA Bus: BxM10
Stillwell Avenue Pelham Parkway	Bidrectional	NYC Bus: Bx12 Local
Pelham Bay Park Amendola Plaza	Bidrectional	MTA Bus: Bx23, Q50, BxM8; NYCT Bus: Bx5, Bx12 Local, Bx24, Bx29; NYC Subway: trains at Pelham Bay Park; Bee-Line: 45
Baychester Avenue Bay Plaza Boulevard	Eastbound	
Bay Plaza Shopping Center The Mall at Bay Plaza	Eastbound terminus, westbound station	NYC Bus: Bx5 (Weekend Only), Bx25, Bx38
Co-Op City Boulevard Bay Plaza Boulevard	Westbound	NYC Bus: Bx5 (Weekend Only), Bx25, Bx38
Bartow Avenue/Bartow Mall (Note: Bartow Mall stop added in Spring 2009.)	Westbound	MTA Bus: Bx23, Q50; NYC Bus: Bx5 (Weekend Only), Bx28
Bartow Avenue Gun Hill Depot Edson Avenue	Westbound	NYC Bus: Bx5 (Weekend Only), Bx25, Bx26, Bx28, Bx38

=== M15 ===
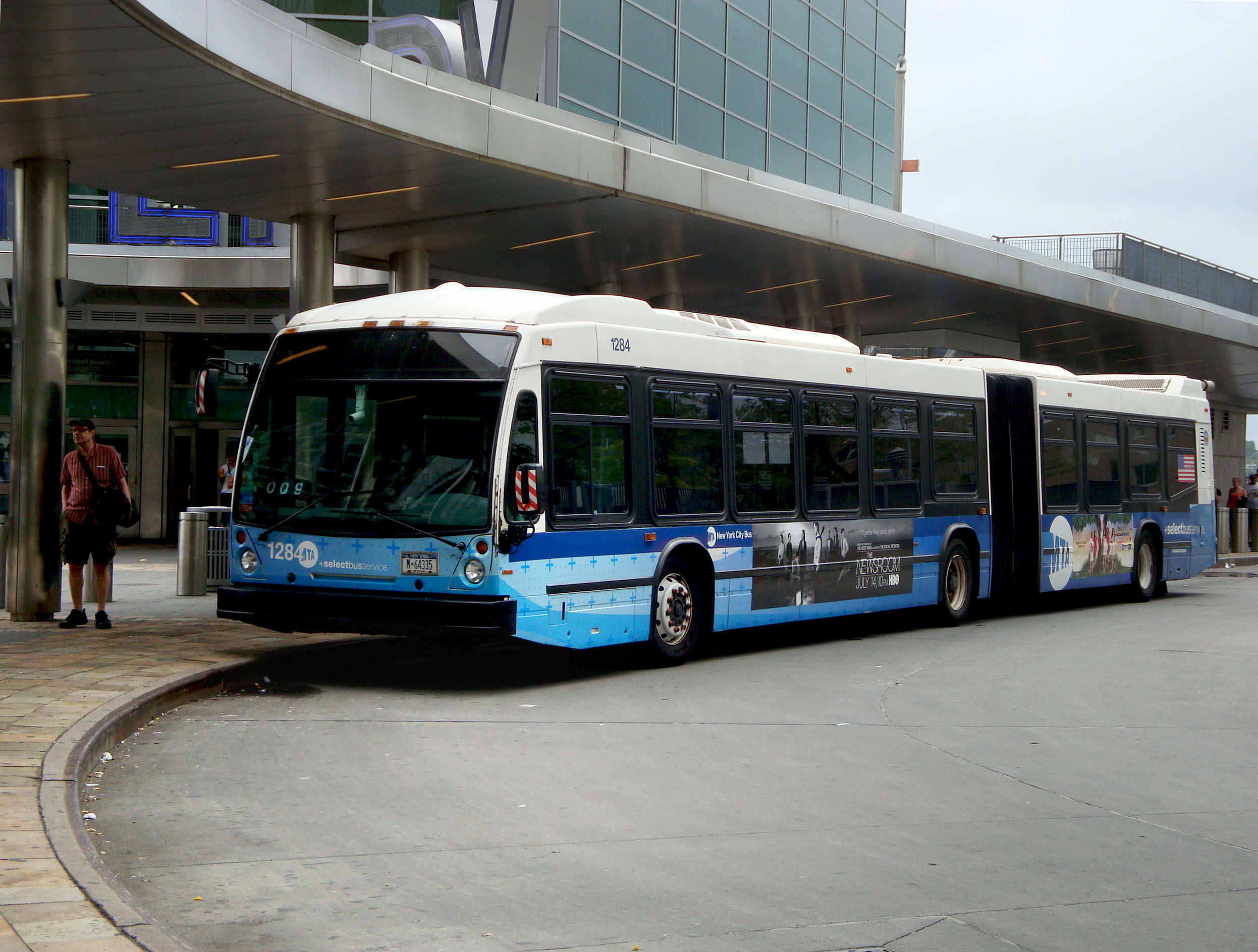
A bus on the M15 SBS route

The M15 Limited became the M15 SBS on October 10, 2010, which replaced limited stop service with SBS on this line. Unlike the former Limited, the M15 SBS makes limited stops south of Houston St, and only runs between 126 Street and South Ferry. St Mark's Place and East 72nd Street were also eliminated. Originally based at the 126th Street Bus Depot, since January 2015, M15 Select Bus Service is now based at the Mother Clara Hale Bus Depot, while the M15 local is based at the Tuskegee Airmen Bus Depot.

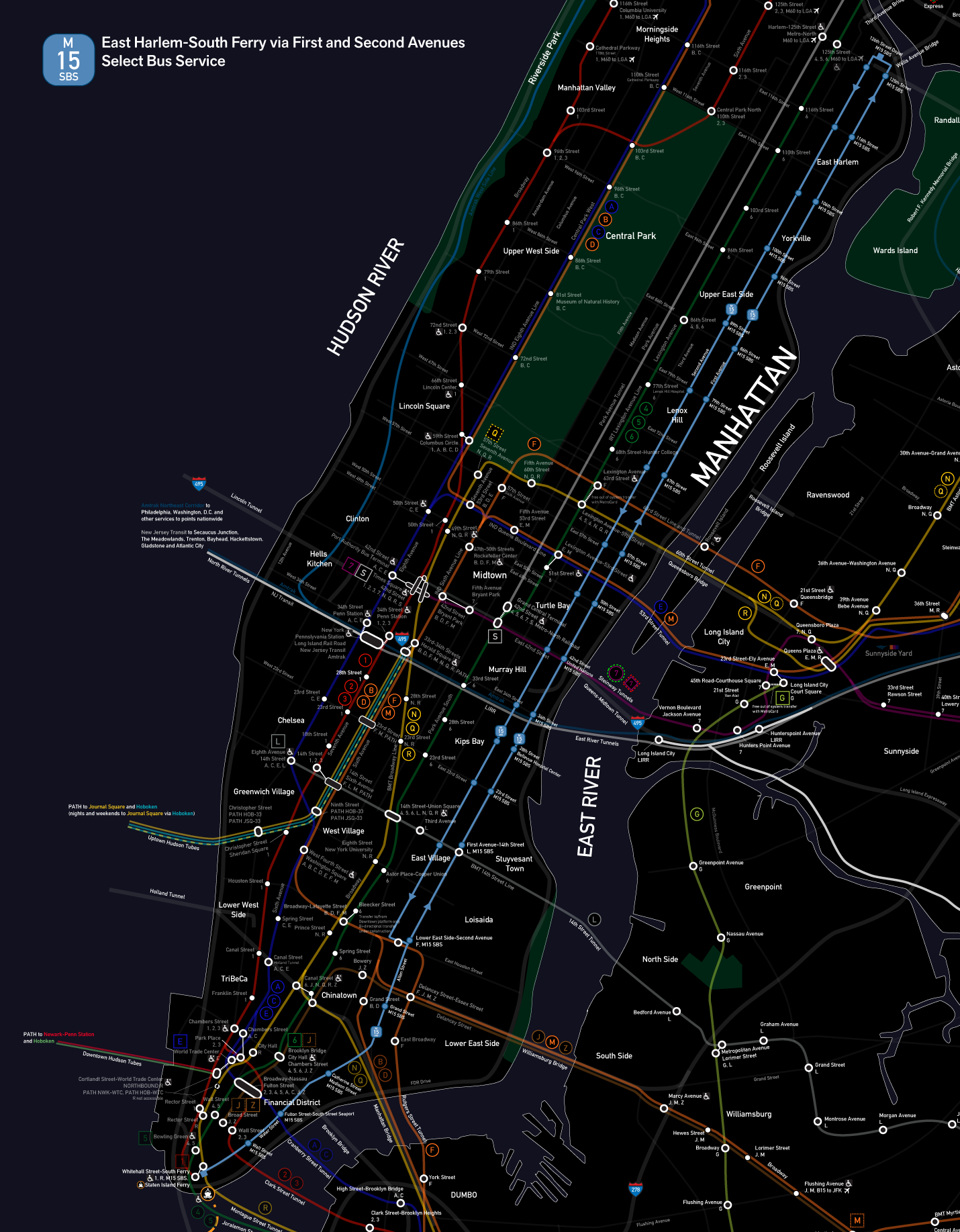
A geographically correct map of the M15 Select Bus Service, showing all stations and connections. The route is shown in turquoise.

Station Street traveled	Direction	Connections
126th Street	Northbound terminus, southbound station	NYC Bus: M15 Local
125th Street	Bidirectional	NYC Bus: M15 Local, M35, M60 SBS, M125
115th / 116th Streets	Bidirectional	NYC Bus: M15 Local, M116 (at 116th Street)
106th Street	Bidirectional	NYC Bus: M15 Local, M106
95th / 97th Streets Metropolitan Hospital	Bidirectional	NYC Bus: M15 Local, M96; NYC Subway: at 96th Street
86th Street	Bidirectional	NYC Bus: M15 Local, M86 SBS; NYC Subway: at 86th Street
79th Street	Bidirectional	NYC Bus: M15 Local, M79 SBS
67th / 68th Streets	Bidirectional	NYC Bus: M15 Local, M66
57th / 58th Streets	Bidirectional	NYC Bus: M15 Local, M31, M57, MTA Bus: Q32, Q60, Roosevelt Island Tram
50th Street	Bidirectional	NYC Bus: M15 Local, M50
42nd / 44th Streets United Nations	Bidirectional	NYC Bus: M15 Local, M42
34th Street NYU Langone Medical Center	Bidirectional	NYC Bus: M15 Local, M34/M34A SBS (M34A westbound only on First Avenue)
28th / 29th Streets Bellevue Hospital	Bidirectional	NYC Bus: M15 Local, M9, M34A SBS
23rd / 25th Streets VA Hospital	Bidirectional	NYC Bus: M15 Local, M9, M23 SBS, M34A SBS
14th Street	Bidirectional	NYC Bus: M14A SBS, M14D SBS, M15 Local; NYC Subway: train at First Avenue (northbound only)
First Street	Northbound only	NYC Bus: M15 Local, M21; NYC Subway: trains at Second Avenue
Northbound service uses First Avenue, southbound service uses Second Avenue
Houston Street	Southbound only	NYC Bus: M15 Local, M21; NYC Subway: trains at Second Avenue
Hester / Grand Streets	Bidirectional	NYC Bus: M15 Local; NYC Subway: trains at Grand Street
Catherine Street Madison Street	Bidirectional	NYC Bus: M15 Local, M22 (eastbound only
Fulton Street South Street Seaport	Bidirectional	NYC Bus: M15 Local; Downtown Connection: Downtown Loop
Wall Street Water Street	Bidirectional	NYC Bus: M15 Local; Downtown Connection: Downtown Loop
South Ferry Whitehall Terminal	Southbound terminal, northbound station	NYC Bus: M15 Local, M20, M55; NYC Subway: trains at South Ferry/Whitehall Street; Staten Island Ferry

=== M34 and M34A ===
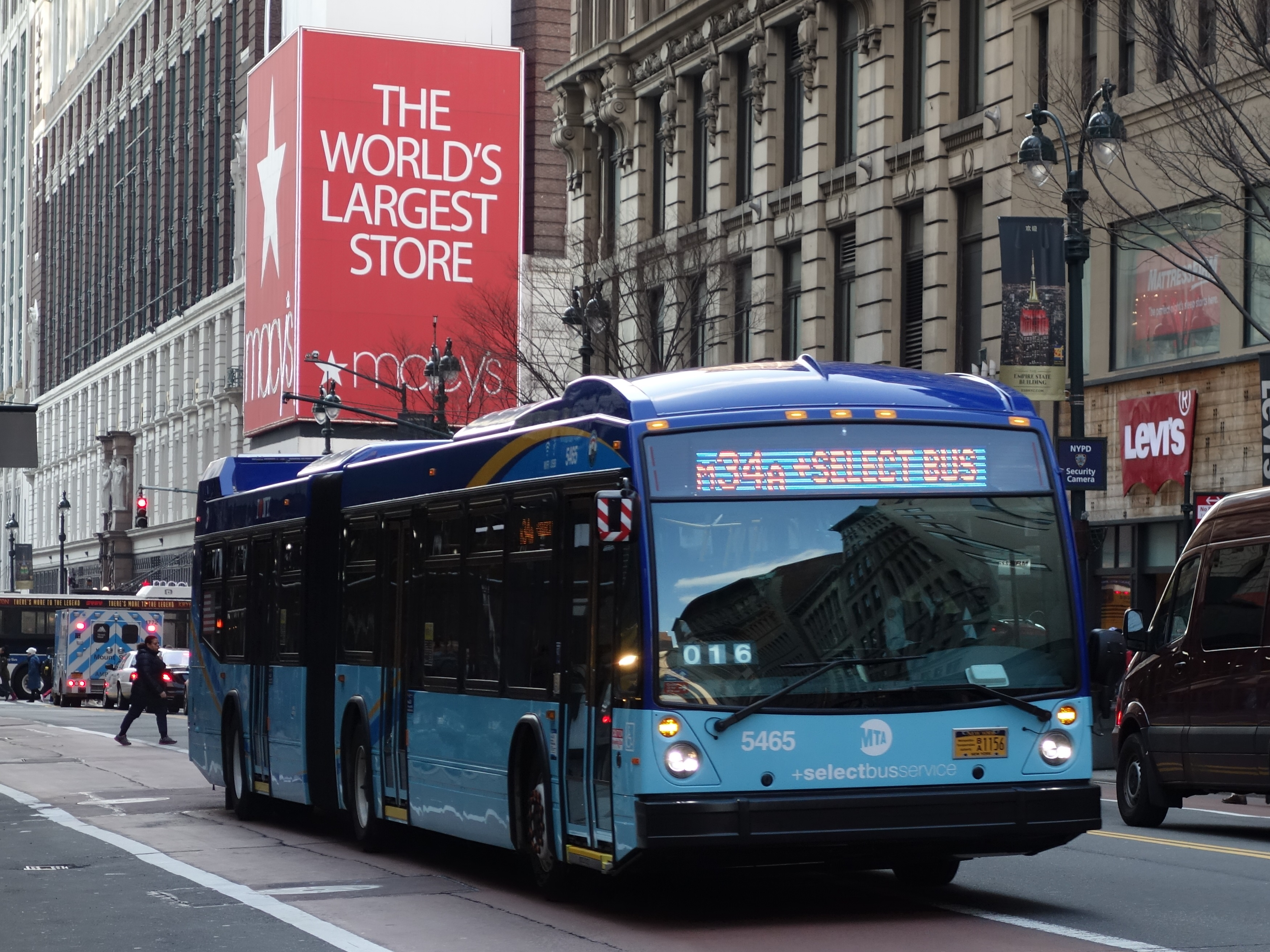
A bus on the M34A SBS route

The M34 SBS and M34A SBS routes began in November 2011. These are considered by the MTA as two SBS services, the M34 34th Street Crosstown and the former M16 route, which was renamed the M34A; the routes share a single corridor. Originally, a provision of this corridor was planned to create a special "Busway" which would have seen both the M34 and M34A SBS lines run along 34th Street in a special two-lane corridor with vehicular traffic traveling in only one direction (westbound after 6th Avenue/Broadway; eastbound after 5th Avenue).

This was eventually scrapped and replaced with curbside and offset bus lanes along 34th Street with bus bulbs at selected bus stops. The stops are listed below from west to east. Alternate M34 SBS trips began originating/terminating at Waterside Plaza with the M34A SBS in September 2017.

This service used non-articulated Orion 7 hybrid-electric buses between November 2011 and early April 2013, when they were replaced by the articulated buses found on the majority of the other SBS routes. The M34 and M34A are both based in the Michael J. Quill Bus Depot.

Station Street traveled	Direction	Connections
M34 only
Twelfth Avenue West 34th Street	Westbound terminal, Eastbound stop	NYC Bus: M12 (northbound only)
Eleventh Avenue / Javits Center West 34th Street	Bidirectional	NYC Bus: M12 (southbound only); NYC Subway: trains at 34th Street–Hudson Yards
Hudson Park Boulevard West 34th Street	Westbound	NYC Bus: M12 (southbound only); NYC Subway: trains at 34th Street–Hudson Yards
Tenth Avenue West 34th Street	Eastbound	NYC Bus: M11 (northbound only)
Dyer Avenue West 34th Street	Westbound	NYC Bus: M11 (northbound only)
M34A only
Port Authority Bus Terminal Eighth Avenue	Westbound terminal	NYC Bus: M20, M104 (all buses northbound only); (M42 at 42nd St); Port Authority Bus Terminal; NYC Subway: trains at Times Square–42nd Street trains at 42nd Street–Port Authority Bus Terminal
42nd Street Ninth Avenue	Eastbound station	NYC Bus: M11 (southbound only); M42
40th Street Eighth Avenue	Westbound	NYC Bus: M20, M104 (all buses northbound only); (M42 at 42nd St); Port Authority Bus Terminal; NYC Subway: trains at Times Square–42nd Street trains at 42nd Street–Port Authority Bus Terminal
39th Street Ninth Avenue	Eastbound	NYC Bus: M11 (southbound only)
37th Street Eighth Avenue	Westbound	NYC Bus: M20, M104 (all buses northbound only)
Common Stops
Ninth Avenue West 34th Street	Both routes (EB); M34 (WB)	NYC Bus: M11 (southbound only)
Eighth Avenue / Penn Station / MSG West 34th Street	Bidirectional	NYC Bus: M20 (northbound only); NYC Subway: trains at 34th Street–Penn Station; Penn Station: Amtrak, LIRR and NJ Transit
Seventh Avenue / Penn Station / MSG West 34th Street	Bidirectional	NYC Bus: M7, M20 (all buses southbound only); NYC Subway: trains at 34th Street–Penn Station; Penn Station: Amtrak, LIRR and NJ Transit
Sixth Avenue / Broadway / Herald Square West 34th Street	Bidirectional	NYC Bus: M5, M7, M55 (all buses northbound only); NYC Subway: trains at 34th Street–Herald Square; PATH: HOB – 33, JSQ – 33, JSQ – 33 (via HOB) trains at 33rd Street
Fifth Avenue / Empire State Building East 34th Street	Bidirectional	NYC Bus: M1, M2, M3, M4, M5, M55 (all buses southbound only) MTA Bus: Q32 (all buses southbound only)
Park Avenue East 34th Street	Bidirectional	NYC Bus: M1, M2, M3, M4 (all buses northbound only) at Madison Avenue; M101, M102, M103 (all buses southbound only) at Lexington Avenue MTA Bus: Q32 (all buses northbound only) at Madison Avenue NYC Subway: train at 33rd Street
Third Avenue East 34th Street	Bidirectional	NYC Bus: M101, M102, M103 (all buses northbound only)
Second Avenue East 34th Street	Bidirectional	NYC Bus: M15, M15 SBS (all buses southbound only)
First Avenue East 34th Street	M34 (EB); Both routes (WB)	NYC Bus: M15, M15 SBS (all buses northbound only)
M34A only
28th Street Second Avenue	Eastbound	NYC Bus: M9, M15, M15 SBS (all buses southbound only)
23rd Street Second Avenue	Eastbound	NYC Bus: M9, M15, M15 SBS (all buses southbound only); M23 SBS
First Avenue VA Hospital	Eastbound	NYC Bus: M15, M15 SBS (all buses northbound only); M9, M23 SBS
Avenue C 23rd Street	Eastbound	
Waterside Plaza 25th Street	Eastbound terminal, Westbound stop	
29th Street FDR Drive	Westbound stop	
M34 only
Marginal Street East River Ferry Terminal	Eastbound terminal, Westbound stop	NYC Ferry, Seastreak

=== S79 ===
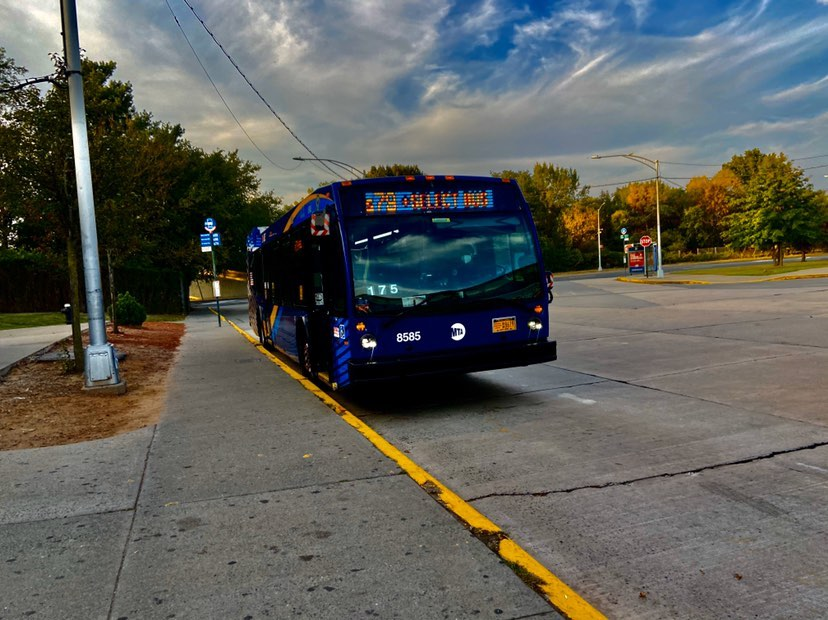
A Bay Ridge-bound S79 SBS bus at the Eltingville Transit Center.

The S79 SBS route began in September 2012. While the routing was left mostly intact, the S79 had all local service eliminated and replaced by local service on the S59 route along Richmond Avenue and the S78 route along Hylan Boulevard. The route was straightened through New Springville to bypass the Yukon Bus Depot. This route uses rigid 40-foot Nova LFS diesel buses, and is the only SBS line that does not utilize off-board fare collection. It is one of two SBS lines in the 5 boroughs that do not use 60-foot articulated buses, along with the B82 SBS, as well as the only SBS line to not have blue destination signs until July 2017. Riders must pay the fare on board, as they do on local, rush, limited-stop, and express buses. The S79 Select Bus Service is based at the Yukon Bus Depot.

Northbound is towards Brooklyn and southbound is towards Staten Island. The S79 SBS is 14.8 miles (23.8 km) long.

Station Street traveled	Direction	Connections
Staten Island Mall Marsh Avenue Park and Ride	Southbound terminus, northbound station	NYC Bus: S55, S56, S61, S89, S91, SIM4, SIM4C, SIM8, SIM31
Staten Island Mall Ring Road – Macy's	Bidirectional	NYC Bus: S44, S59, S94
Staten Island Mall Ring Road – Sears	Bidirectional	NYC Bus: S44, S59, S94
Yukon Avenue Richmond Avenue	Bidirectional	NYC Bus: S44, S55, S56, S59, S61, S89, S91, S94, SIM4, SIM4C, SIM8, SIM31
Eltingville Transit Center	Bidirectional	NYC Bus: S55, S56, S59, S74, S84, S89, SIM1, SIM1C, SIM4, SIM4C, SIM5, SIM6, SIM7, SIM8, SIM10, SIM15, SIM22, SIM31
Genesee Avenue	Bidirectional	NYC Bus: S59, SIM1, SIM1C, SIM7, SIM10, SIM22
Eltingville Boulevard	Bidirectional	NYC Bus: S59, S89, SIM1, SIM1C, SIM7, SIM10, SIM22; Staten Island Railway at Eltingville
Hylan Boulevard Richmond Avenue	Southbound	NYC Bus: S54, S59, S78, S89, SIM1, SIM1C, SIM7, SIM9, SIM10, SIM22
Winchester Avenue Hylan Boulevard	Northbound	NYC Bus: S54, S78, SIM1, SIM1C, SIM7, SIM9, SIM10, SIM22
Nelson Avenue	Bidirectional	NYC Bus: S54, S78, SIM1, SIM1C, SIM5, SIM6, SIM7, SIM9, SIM10
Bay Terrace	Bidirectional	NYC Bus: S78, SIM1, SIM1C, SIM5, SIM6, SIM7, SIM9, SIM10
Buffalo Street Great Kills Park	Bidirectional	NYC Bus: S78, SIM1, SIM1C, SIM5, SIM6, SIM7, SIM9, SIM10
Guyon Av	Bidirectional	NYC Bus: S57, S78, SIM1, SIM1C, SIM5, SIM6, SIM7, SIM9, SIM10
Tysens Lane	Bidirectional	NYC Bus: S57, S78, SIM1, SIM1C, SIM5, SIM6, SIM7, SIM9, SIM10, SIM11
Ebbitts Street	Bidirectional	NYC Bus: S78, SIM1, SIM1C, SIM5, SIM6, SIM7, SIM9, SIM10, SIM11
New Dorp Lane	Bidirectional	NYC Bus: S76, S78, S86, SIM1, SIM1C, SIM5, SIM6, SIM7, SIM9, SIM10, SIM11
Midland Avenue	Bidirectional	NYC Bus: S51, S78, S81, SIM1, SIM1C, SIM7, SIM10, SIM11
Seaview Avenue	Bidirectional	NYC Bus: S78, SIM1, SIM1C, SIM7, SIM10, SIM11
Old Town Road / Quintard Street	Bidirectional	NYC Bus: S78, SIM1, SIM1C, SIM7, SIM10, SIM11; Staten Island Railway at Old Town
Clove Road	Bidirectional	NYC Bus: S53, S78, SIM1, SIM1C, SIM7, SIM10, SIM11
Narrows Road	Bidirectional	NYC Bus: S78, S93, SIM1, SIM1C, SIM3C, SIM7, SIM10, SIM11, SIM15, SIM33C, SIM35
Fingerboard Road	Bidirectional	NYC Bus: S52, S93, SIM1, SIM1C, SIM3C, SIM7, SIM10, SIM11, SIM15, SIM33C, SIM35
Verrazzano–Narrows Bridge – Staten Island/Brooklyn border
92nd Street Fort Hamilton Parkway	Bidirectional	NYC Bus: B8, B70, S53, S93
Bay Ridge – 86th Street Fourth Avenue	Northbound terminus, southbound station	NYC Bus: B1, B16, S53, S93; NYC Subway: train at 86th Street

=== Bx41 ===
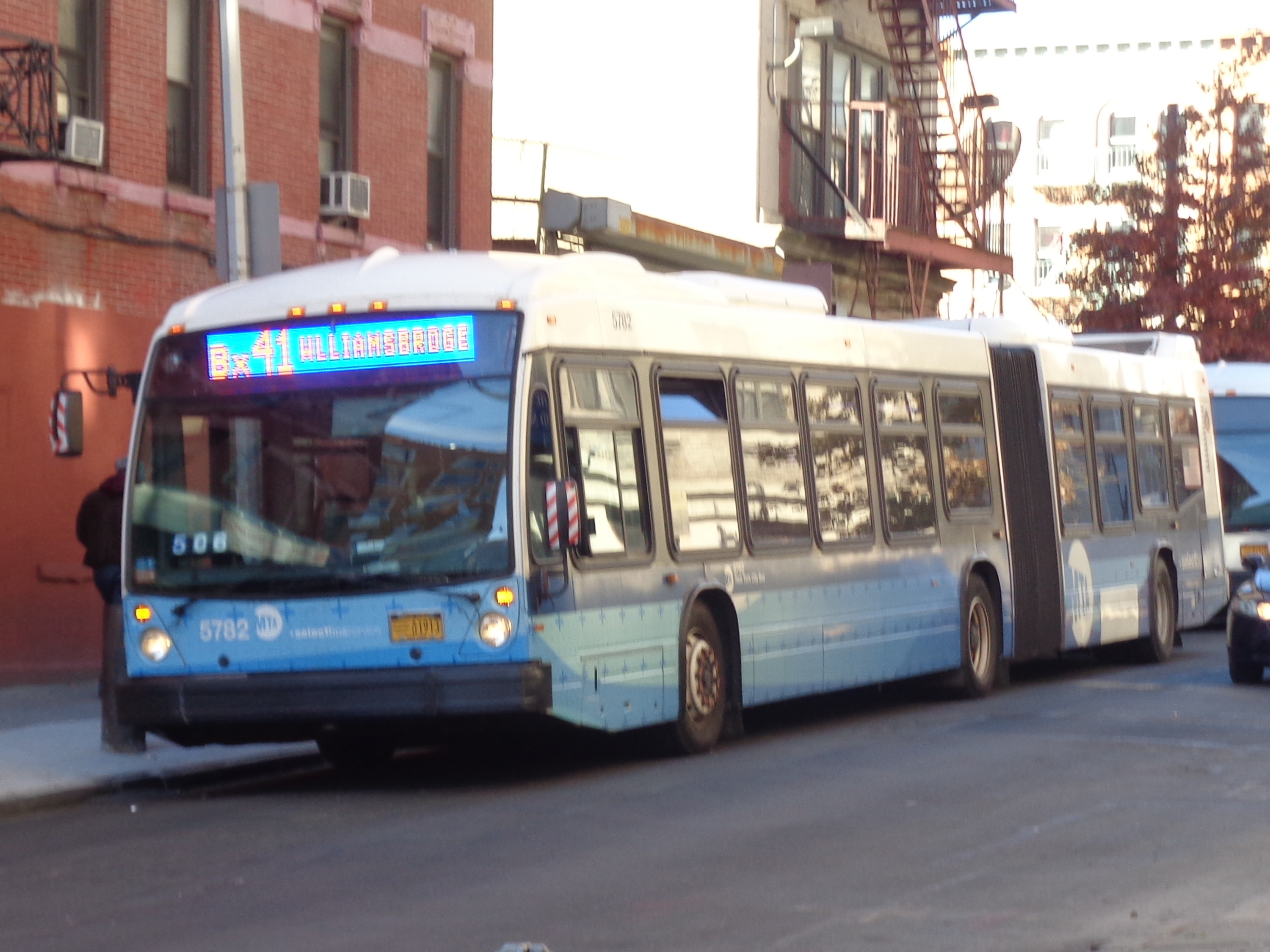
A bus on the Bx41 SBS route

The Bx41 Limited, running along Webster Avenue and Melrose Avenue in the Bronx, was the first route to be converted into a Phase II Select Bus Service line. The Bx41 SBS began service in June 2013. The stops are nearly identical to the limited service it replaced, and service was expanded from peak hours to seven days a week. The stops are listed from south to north below. Both the Bx41 local & SBS were originally based at the Kingsbridge Depot. In January 2017, both routes were moved to the Gun Hill Depot to ease the pressure and relieve the severe overcrowding at the Kingsbridge Bus Depot.

Station Street traveled	Direction	Connections
The Hub East 149th Street Melrose Avenue	Southbound terminus	NYCT Bus: Bx2, Bx4/4A, Bx15, Bx19, Bx21, Bx41 Local, M125; NYC Subway: trains at Third Avenue–149th Street
East 148th Street Third Avenue	Northbound station	NYCT Bus: Bx2, Bx4/4A, Bx15, Bx19, Bx21, Bx41 Local, M125; NYC Subway: trains at Third Avenue–149th Street
East 160th/162nd Streets Melrose Avenue	Bidirectional	NYCT Bus: Bx6, Bx6 SBS, Bx13, Bx41 Local; Metro-North: Harlem Line at Melrose (two blocks west on Park Avenue)
East 167th Street Webster Avenue	Bidirectional	NYCT Bus: Bx35, Bx41 Local
East 170th Street Webster Avenue	Bidirectional	NYCT Bus: Bx41 Local
Claremont Parkway Webster Avenue	Bidirectional	NYCT Bus: Bx11, Bx41 Local
East Tremont Avenue Webster Avenue	Bidirectional	NYCT Bus: Bx36, Bx41 Local; Metro-North: Harlem Line at Tremont (one block east on Park Avenue)
East 180th Street Webster Avenue	Bidirectional	NYCT Bus: Bx40, Bx41 Local, Bx42
East Fordham Road Fordham Plaza, Fordham University Webster Avenue	Bidirectional	NYCT Bus: Bx9, Bx12, Bx12 SBS, Bx15, Bx17, Bx22, Bx41 Local; Metro-North: Harlem Line and New Haven Line at Fordham; Bee-Line: 60, 61, 62
Bedford Park Boulevard Botanical Garden Webster Avenue	Bidirectional	NYCT Bus: Bx25, Bx26, Bx41 Local; Metro-North: Harlem Line at Botanical Garden
East 204th Street Webster Avenue	Bidirectional	NYCT Bus: Bx41 Local
East Gun Hill Road Webster Avenue	Bidirectional	NYCT Bus: Bx28, Bx38, Bx41 Local
Williamsbridge East Gun Hill Road White Plains Road	Southbound station, northbound terminus	MTA Bus: BxM11; NYCT Bus: Bx28, Bx38, Bx39, Bx41 Local; NYC Subway: trains at Gun Hill Road

=== B44 ===
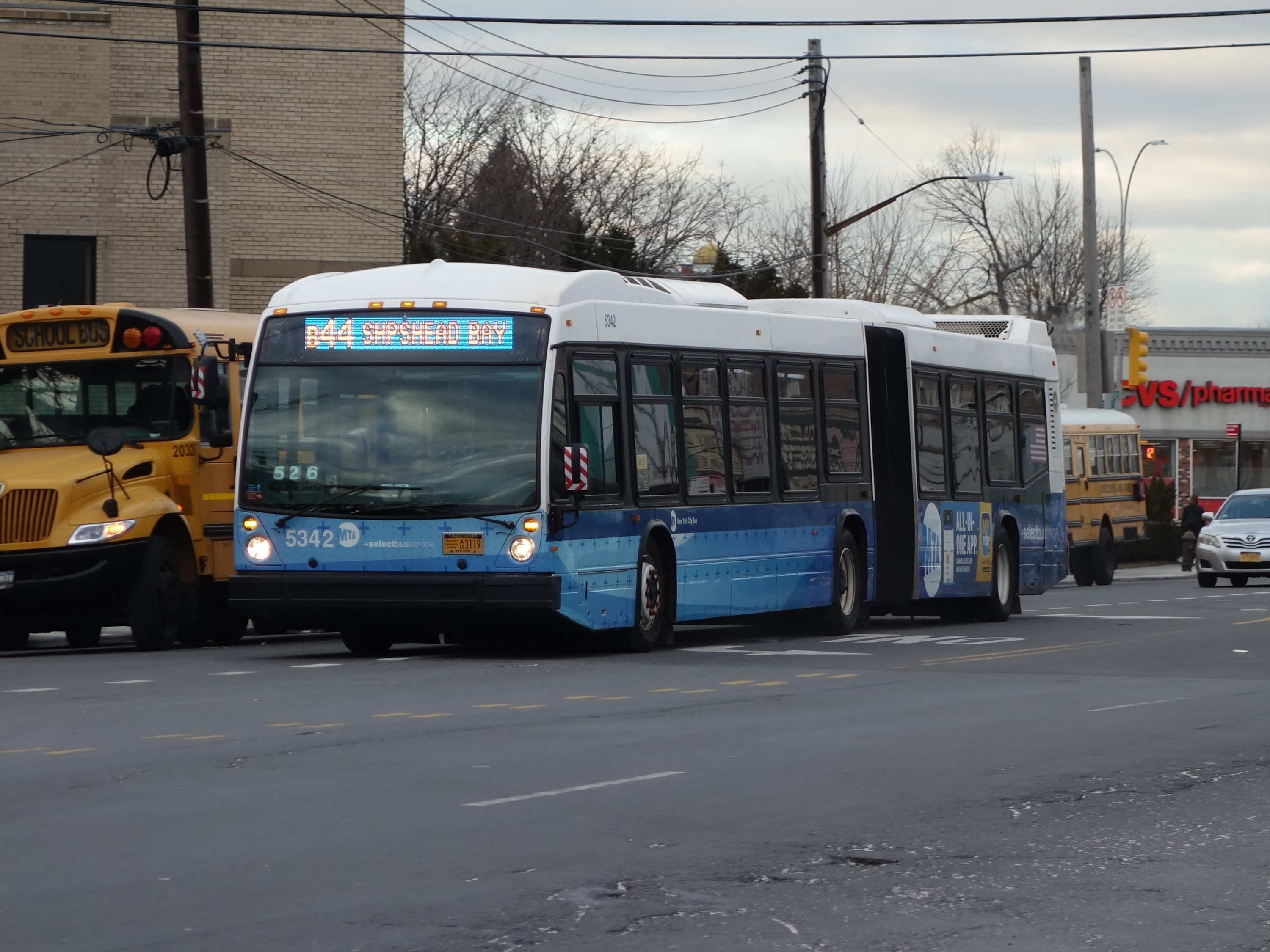
A bus on the B44 SBS route

The B44 SBS route began in November 2013, replacing the B44 Limited service with Select Bus Service. Initially planned for the end of 2011, then later the summer of 2012, the start date was pushed to November 2013 as the buses for the service did not arrive until early 2013. Unlike other SBS routes, this service involved a significant change in route, and approximately 20 limited stops were eliminated. The elimination of the Avenue L stop, located adjacent to a school, from the SBS route, was controversial, with local elected representatives and community members starting a petition and calling for its restoration. In February 2014, just under three months since its launch, the MTA conceded to community pressure and added Avenue L and Gates Avenue to the SBS route. This bus is based at the Flatbush Bus Depot. Stops are listed from south to north.

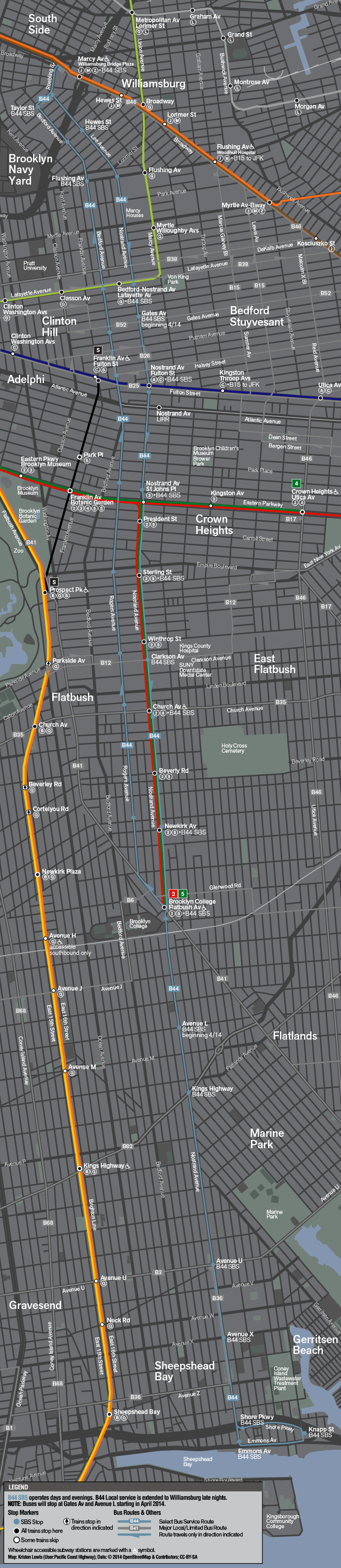
A map showing the B44 SBS (in light blue) with rail connections.

Station Street traveled	Direction	Connections
Knapp Street Emmons Avenue	Southbound terminus, northbound station	NYC Bus: B4, B44 Local
Emmons Avenue Nostrand Avenue	Northbound	NYC Bus: B4, B44 Local
Shore Parkway Nostrand Avenue	Southbound	NYC Bus: B4, B44 Local
Avenue X	Bidirectional	NYC Bus: B36, B44 Local
Avenue U	Bidirectional	NYC Bus: B3, B36, B44 Local
Avenue R	Bidirectional	NYC Bus: B2, B31, B44 Local
Kings Highway	Bidirectional	NYC Bus: B7, B44 Local, B82 Local, B82 SBS
Avenue L	Bidirectional	NYC Bus: B9, B44 Local
Avenue H (Flatbush Avenue)	Bidirectional	MTA Bus: B103, Q35; NYC Bus: B6, B11, B41, B44 Local; NYC Subway: trains at Flatbush Avenue–Brooklyn College
Northbound traffic uses Rogers Avenue, southbound traffic uses Nostrand Avenue
Avenue D / Newkirk Avenue (Note: Newkirk Avenue and Avenue D stops added to the plan in 2010.)	Bidirectional	NYC Bus: B8, B44 Local; NYC Subway: trains at Newkirk Avenue–Little Haiti (on Nostrand Avenue only)
Church Avenue	Bidirectional	NYC Bus: B35, B44 Local; NYC Subway: trains at Church Avenue (on Nostrand Avenue only)
Clarkson Avenue	Bidirectional	NYC Bus: B12, B44 Local; NYC Subway: trains at Winthrop Street (on Nostrand Avenue only)
Empire Boulevard	Bidirectional	NYC Bus: B43, B44 Local; NYC Subway: trains at Sterling Street (on Nostrand Avenue only)
St. John's Place	Bidirectional	NYC Bus: B44 Local, B45; NYC Subway: trains at Nostrand Avenue (on Nostrand Avenue only)
Northbound buses continue from Rogers Avenue to Bedford Avenue
Fulton Street	Bidirectional	NYC Bus: B25, B44 Local, B49,(from Bedford Avenue only); NYC Subway: trains at Nostrand Avenue (on Nostrand Avenue only); LIRR: Nostrand Avenue (on Nostrand Avenue only)
Gates Avenue	Bidirectional	NYC Bus: B44 Local, B52
Lafayette Avenue /DeKalb Avenue	Bidirectional	NYC Bus: B38, B44 Local; NYC Subway: train at Bedford–Nostrand Avenues
Flushing Avenue	Bidirectional	NYC Bus: B44 Local, B48, B57
Southbound traffic continues from Lee Avenue to Nostrand Avenue
Hewes Street (Note: Hewes Street stop added in September 2011.)	Bidirectional	
Taylor Street	Bidirectional	
Bidirectional traffic resumes on Roebling Street
Williamsburg Bridge Plaza Broadway / Havemeyer Street	Northbound terminus, southbound station	NYC Bus: B24, B32, B39, B46, B60, B62, Q54, Q59; NYC Subway: trains at Marcy Avenue

=== M60 ===
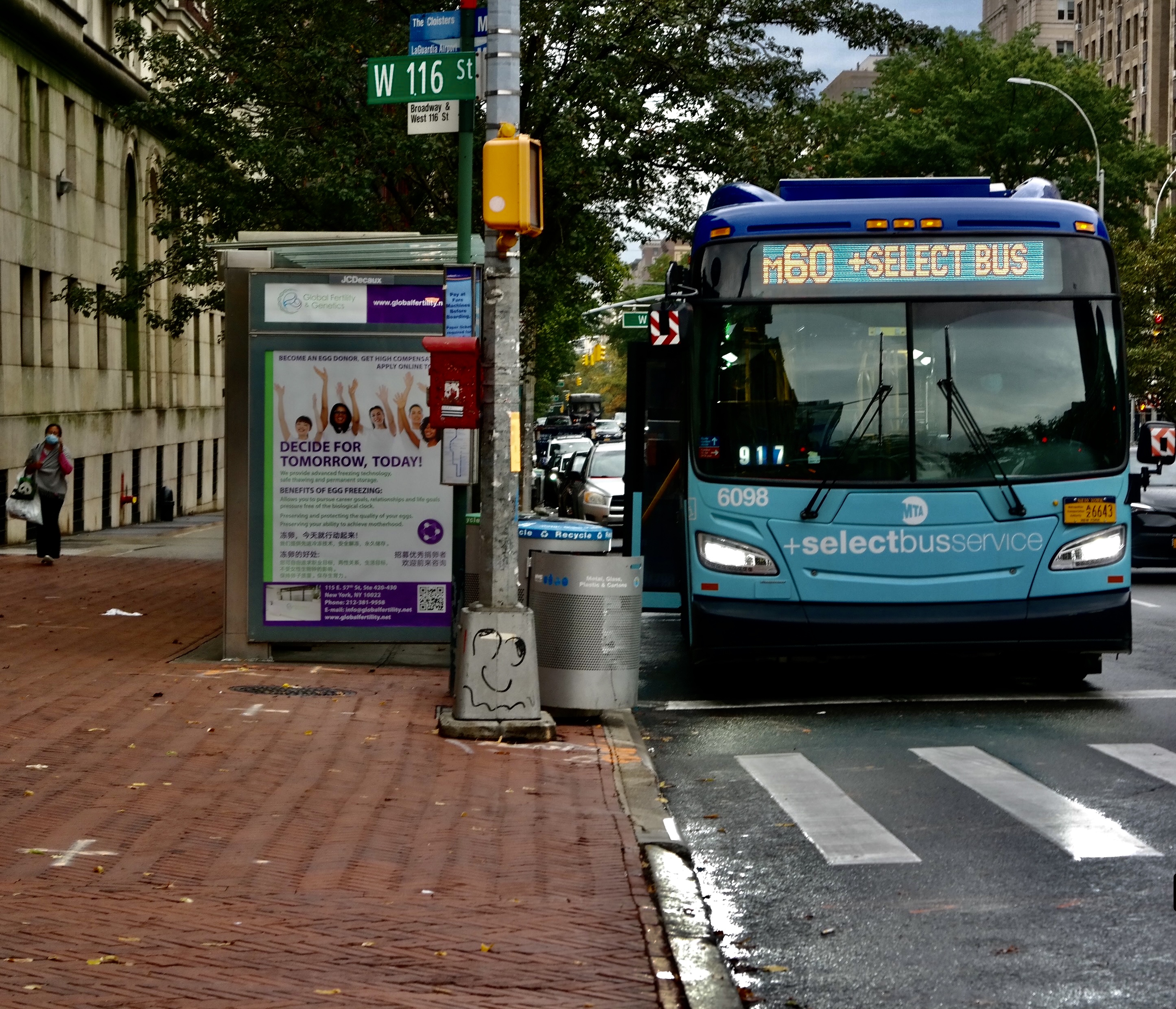
An M60 bus in Morningside Heights in 2020.

The M60 operates between the Upper West Side of Manhattan and LaGuardia Airport, providing crosstown service along 125th Street in Harlem. Select Bus Service was originally scheduled to begin in mid or late 2013, but was pushed to May 2014 due to community opposition, citing loss of available parking spaces along 125th Street in Manhattan. Due to its status as an airport connector, buses on the route are equipped with luggage racks.

The M60 was based at 126th Street Depot upon implementation as a Select Bus Service route. In January 2015, the M60 moved to the Michael J. Quill Bus Depot, where most Manhattan crosstown routes are based, due to the closing of the 126th Street Depot. On April 2, 2023, it was once again moved, this time to Mother Clara Hale Depot, due to roof construction at Michael J. Quill Bus Depot. On January 5, 2025, it was moved back to Michael J. Quill Bus Depot. The stops are listed below, west to east. Stops at the eastern end of the route, within LaGuardia Airport, are marked "Airport Stop".

Station Street traveled	Direction	Connections
Manhattan
West 106th Street Broadway	Eastbound station, westbound terminal	NYC Bus: M104, M116
West 116th Street Columbia University	Bidirectional	NYC Bus: M4, M104; NYC Subway: train at 116th Street–Columbia University
West 120th Street / Broadway	Bidirectional	NYC Bus: M4, M104
West 120th Street / Amsterdam Avenue	Bidirectional	NYC Bus: M11
LaSalle Street / Amsterdam Avenue 125th Street	Bidirectional	NYC Bus: M11, M100, M101, M104, M125
St. Nicholas Avenue / Douglass Boulevard 125th Street	Bidirectional	NYC Bus: M3, M10, M100, M101, M125; NYC Subway: trains at 125th Street
Lenox Avenue 125th Street	Bidirectional	NYC Bus: M1 (southbound only at Fifth Avenue), M7, M101, M102, M125; NYC Subway: trains at 125th Street
Madison Avenue / Park Avenue 125th Street	Bidirectional	NYC Bus: M1 (northbound only; southbound at Fifth Avenue), M98 (southbound only), M101, M125; Metro-North at Harlem–125th Street
Lexington Avenue 125th Street	Bidirectional	NYC Bus: M35, M98 (northbound only at Third Avenue), M101, M103, M125; NYC Subway: trains at 125th Street; Metro-North at Harlem–125th Street
Second Avenue 125th Street	Bidirectional	NYC Bus: M15, M15 SBS, M125
Triborough Bridge
Queens
31st Street Hoyt Avenue	Bidirectional	MTA Bus: Q19; NYC Subway: trains at Astoria Boulevard
Steinway Street Astoria Boulevard	Bidirectional	MTA Bus: Q19, Q101
77th Street Astoria Boulevard	Bidirectional	MTA Bus: Q19
82nd Street 23rd Avenue	Eastbound	MTA Bus: Q33, Q47
Ditmars Boulevard / 82nd Street § Grand Central Parkway Service Road North	Westbound	MTA Bus: Q47, Q69
87th Street 23rd Avenue	Eastbound	MTA Bus: Q47
94th Street 23rd Avenue	Eastbound	MTA Bus: Q47, Q72
Terminal B	Airport stop	MTA Bus: Q70 SBS, Q72; NYC Bus: Q90; LGA Shuttle Bus
Terminal C	Airport stop	MTA Bus: Q70 SBS, Q72; NYC Bus: Q90; LGA Shuttle Bus
Terminal A Marine Air Terminal	Airport stop	MTA Bus: Q33; LGA Shuttle Bus
Notes: 1. The route loops around LaGuardia Airport terminal bus stops and continues operating back toward the westbound terminus. There is no eastbound terminus stand.; 2. Passengers traveling eastbound toward LaGuardia Airport must be off the bus by the Terminal A (Marine Air Terminal) stop, or purchase a westbound fare at fare payment machines at LaGuardia Airport stops.; 3. Bus stops marked with an (§) are not served between midnight and 6 AM, when the 82nd Street exit (and the airport in general) is closed.

=== M86 ===
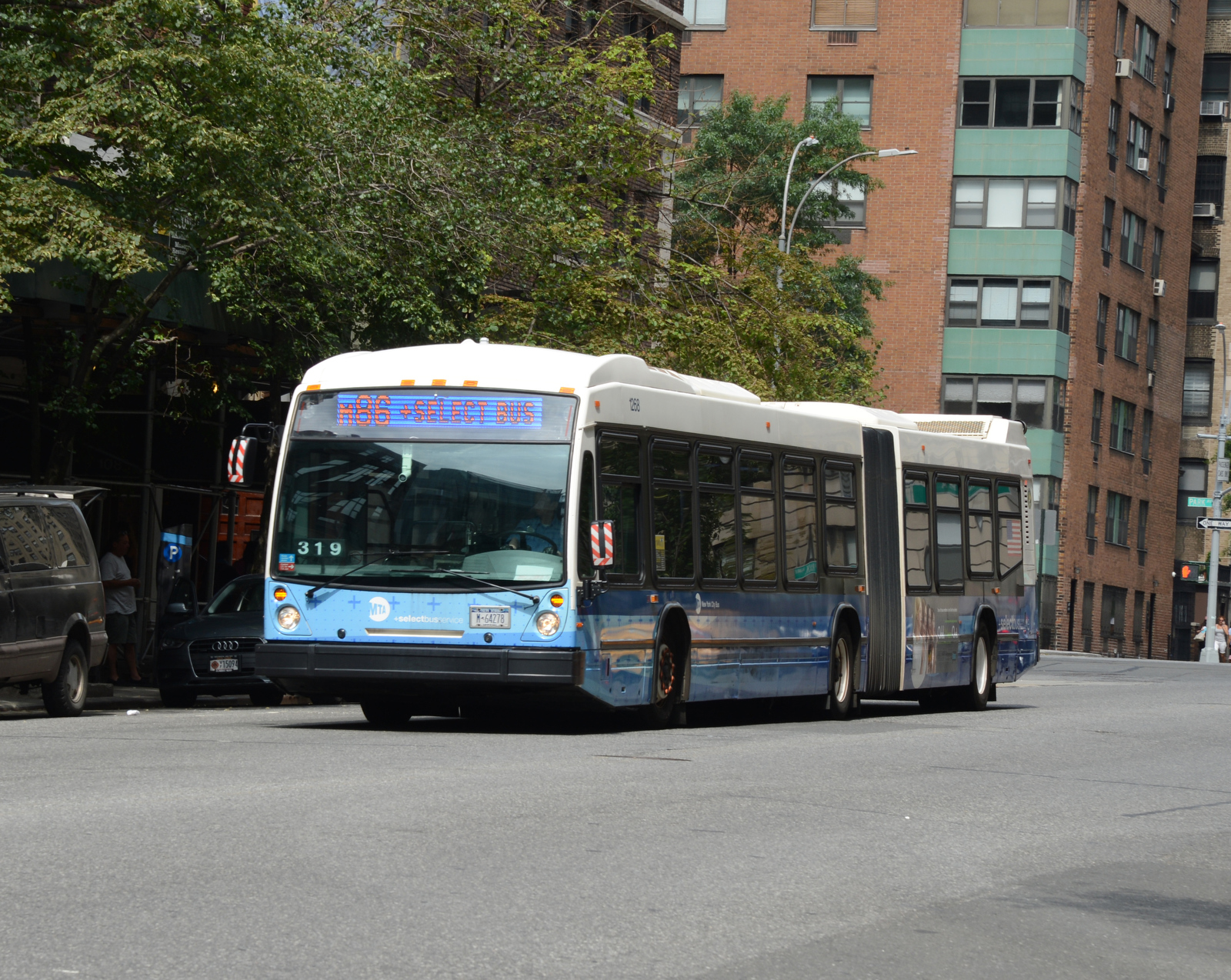
An M86 SBS during the debut of SBS service in 2015.

The M86 bus, running crosstown along 86th Street in Manhattan, was identified as a potential bus rapid transit corridor in 2009. The M86 SBS route debuted in July 2015. It was the fourth corridor in Manhattan and the fifth Manhattan bus line to have Select Bus Service. The M86 SBS was based at the Tuskegee Airmen Depot, but was switched to the Michael J. Quill Depot in January 2018.

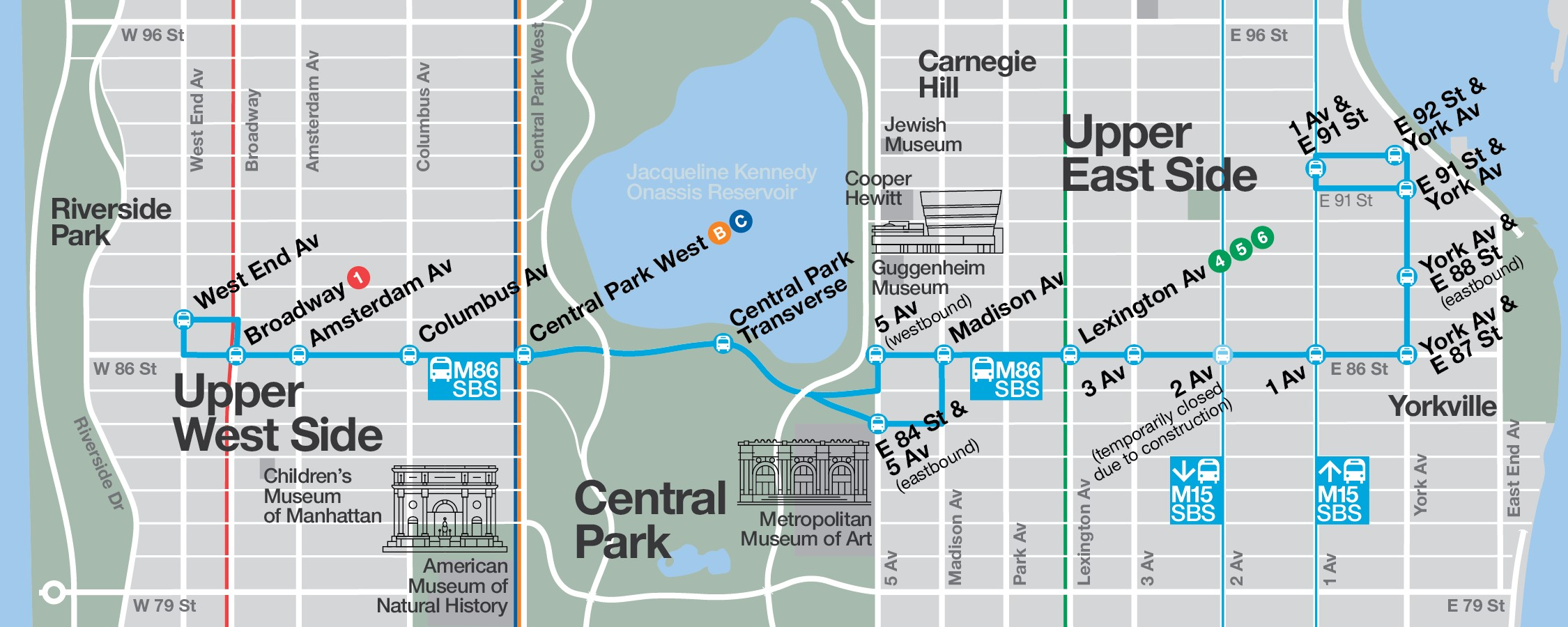
A geographically correct map of the M86 Select Bus Service route, showing all stations and connections. The route is in light blue, bolded.

Station Street traveled	Direction	Connections
West End Avenue West 86th Street	Westbound terminus, Eastbound station	NYC Bus: M5 (one block to Riverside Drive)
Broadway West 86th Street	Bidirectional	NYC Bus: M104; NYC Subway: trains at 86th Street
West 86th Street Amsterdam Avenue	Bidirectional	NYC Bus: M7, M11 (all buses northbound only)
West 86th Street Broadway	Bidirectional	NYC Bus: M7, M11 (all buses northbound only)
Central Park West West 86th Street	Bidirectional	NYC Bus: M10; NYC Subway: trains at at 86th Street
Central Park Police Precinct 86th Street Transverse Roadkill	Bidirectional	Note: This stop has no MetroCard fare machines, thus riders boarding here must obtain proof of fare payment receipt at the next stop (Central Park West or Fifth Ave depending on direction of travel). This restriction does not apply to OMNY users.
Fifth Avenue East 86th Street	Westbound	NYC Bus: M1, M2, M3, M4 (all buses southbound only)
Fifth Avenue East 84th Street	Eastbound	NYC Bus: M1, M2, M3, M4 (all buses southbound only)
Madison Avenue East 86th Street	Bidirectional	NYC Bus: M1, M2, M3, M4 (all buses northbound only)
Lexington Avenue East 86th Street	Bidirectional	NYC Bus: M98, M101, M102, M103 (all buses southbound only); NYC Subway: trains at 86th Street
Third Avenue East 86th Street	Bidirectional	NYC Bus: M98, M101, M102, M103 (all buses northbound only)
Second Avenue East 86th Street	Bidirectional	NYC Bus: M15 Local, M15 SBS (all buses southbound only); NYC Subway: at 86th Street
First Avenue East 86th Street	Bidirectional	NYC Bus: M15 Local, M15 SBS (all buses northbound only)
York Avenue East 87th / 86th Streets	Bidirectional	NYC Bus: M31
York Avenue East 88th 89th Streets	Eastbound	NYC Bus: M31
York Avenue East 91st Street	Bidirectional	NYC Bus: M31
1st Avenue East 91st Street	Eastbound terminus	NYC Bus: M31
York Avenue East 92nd Street	Westbound Station	NYC Bus: M31

=== Q44 ===
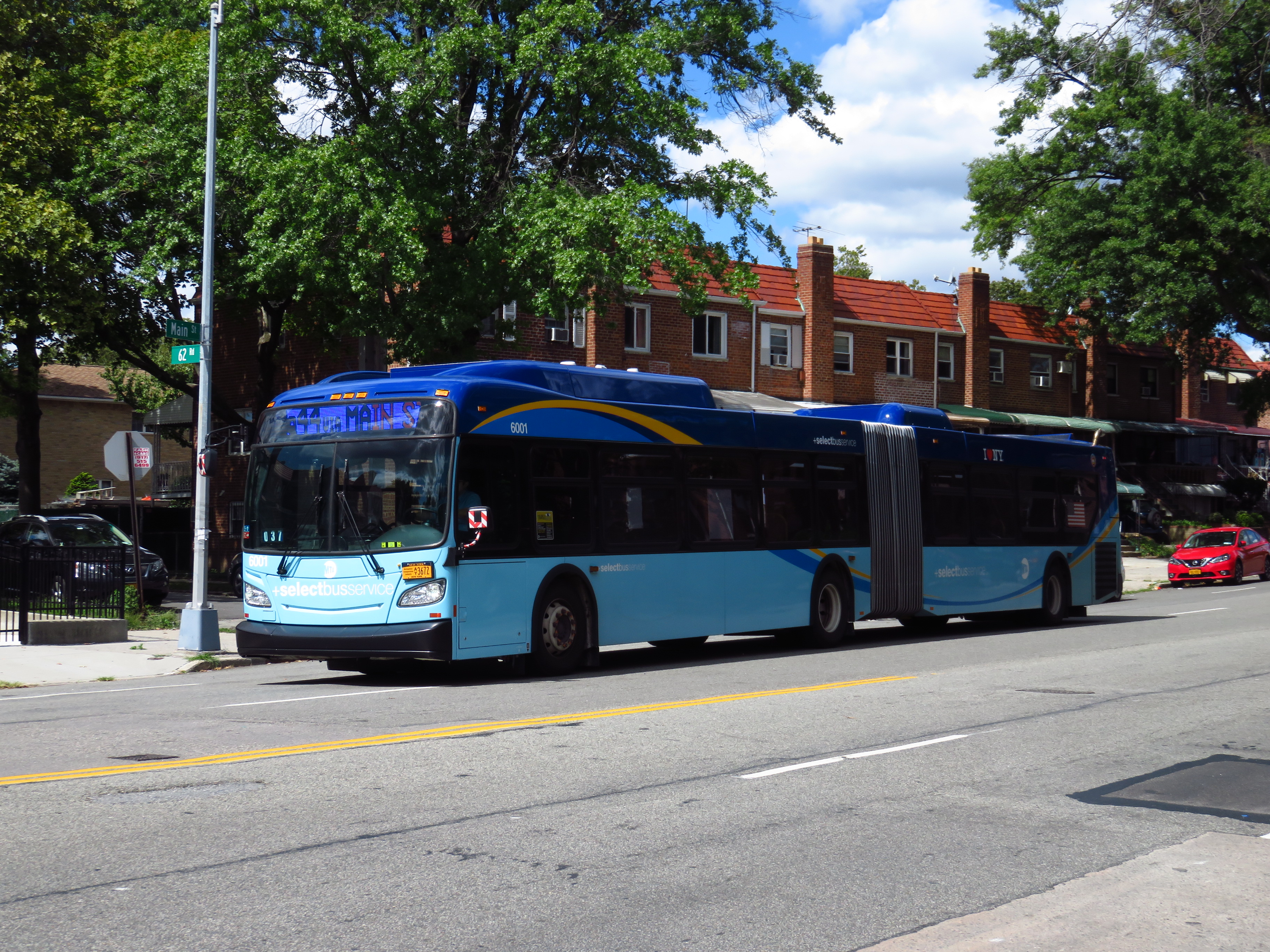
A Jamaica bound Q44 SBS in Flushing, Queens.

In 2015, the Main Street corridor, along with the parallel Kissena/Parsons Boulevards corridor and the 164th Street corridor, was studied by the NYC Department of Transportation for the implementation of SBS between Flushing and Jamaica, Queens. The Q44 Limited route, which formerly made limited stops only during the day, was planned for conversion into a full-time bus rapid transit line, with local service continuing to be provided by the parallel Q20A/B (now Q20) services.

The Q44 SBS was approved in June 2015, with no changes from the original routing, which runs between Queens and the Bronx. Due to community opposition, bus lanes were only installed on a small portion of the route between Roosevelt Avenue and the Long Island Expressway in Downtown Flushing and Queensboro Hill, and on Archer Avenue and Sutphin Boulevard in Jamaica. Portions of the Archer Avenue lanes were installed before the implementation of SBS.

The route began service in November 2015. The Q44 is the first Q-prefixed route to have Select Bus Service, which replaces both the Q44 late-night local and daytime limited-stop buses. Local bus service in Queens is provided by the Q20, while there is no local equivalent in the Bronx. The Q20 and the Q44 SBS are based at the Casey Stengel Depot.

Station Street traveled	Direction	Connections
The Bronx
East 180th Street / Devoe Avenue Bronx Zoo	Northern terminus	NYC Bus: Bx9, Bx40, Bx42
Boston Road / East 180th Street	Southbound station	NYC Bus: Bx9, Bx40, Bx42
East Tremont Avenue / East 177th Street	Southbound	NYC Bus: Bx9, Bx21, Bx36; NYC Subway: trains at West Farms Square–East Tremont Avenue
Devoe Av / Wyatt Street	Northbound	NYC Bus: Bx9, Bx21, Bx36; NYC Subway: trains at West Farms Square–East Tremont Avenue
Rosedale / Commonwealth Avenues (East 177th Street/Cross Bronx Expressway)	Bidirectional	NYC Bus: Bx11
Beach Avenue (East 177th Street/Cross Bronx Expressway)	Southbound	NYC Bus: Bx11
Taylor Avenue (East 177th Street/Cross Bronx Expressway)	Northbound	NYC Bus: Bx11
Westchester / Virginia Avenues Hugh J. Grant Circle	Southbound	NYC Bus: Bx4, Bx4A, Bx11, Bx36, Bx39; MTA Bus: BxM6; NYC Subway: trains at Parkchester
Metropolitan Avenue Hugh J. Grant Circle	Northbound	NYC Bus: Bx4, Bx4A, Bx11, Bx36, Bx39; MTA Bus: BxM6; NYC Subway: trains at Parkchester
Newbold Avenue (East 177th Street/Cross Bronx Expressway)	Northbound	
Pugsley Avenue (East 177th Street/Cross Bronx Expressway)	Southbound	
Haviland Avenue (East 177th Street/Cross Bronx Expressway)	Northbound	NYC Bus: Bx22 at Castle Hill Avenue
Castle Hill Avenue (East 177th Street/Cross Bronx Expressway)	Southbound	NYC Bus: Bx22
Zerega Avenue (East 177th Street/Cross Bronx Expressway)	Northbound	Note: This northbound Bronx bus stop is for MTA employees only to access the Zerega Training and Maintenance Facility.
Brush Avenue (Bruckner Boulevard)	Bidirectional	NYC Bus: Bx5; MTA Bus: Q50
Lafayette Avenue (Hutchinson River Parkway)	Bidirectional	MTA Bus: Q50
Bronx–Whitestone Bridge
Queens
14th Avenue (Parsons Boulevard)	Bidirectional	NYC Bus: Q76; MTA Bus: QM2, QM32
20th Avenue (Parsons Boulevard)	Bidirectional	NYC Bus: Q20; MTA Bus: QM2, QM32
26th Avenue (Union Street)	Bidirectional	NYC Bus: Q20, Q61; MTA Bus: QM2, QM20, QM32
31st Road / Bayside Avenue (Union Street)	Bidirectional	NYC Bus: Q20, Q16, Q61
35th Avenue (Union Street)	Bidirectional	NYC Bus: Q17, Q20, Q27; MTA Bus: Q25, Q50
38th / 39th Avenues (Main Street)	Bidirectional	NYC Bus: Q12, Q13, Q15, Q16, Q17, Q20, Q27, Q58, Q61, Q90, Q98; MTA Bus: Q19, Q25, Q26, Q28, Q50, Q63, Q65, Q66 NICE Bus: n20G, n20x NYC Subway: trains at Flushing–Main Street; Note: The northbound stop at 38th Avenue is for pick-ups only, while the northbound stop at 39th Avenue is for drop-offs only.
41st Avenue / Kissena Boulevard (Main Street)	Bidirectional	NYC Bus: Q17, Q20, Q27, Q58, Q98; MTA Bus: Q25, Q26, Q65; NICE Bus: n20G, n20X; LIRR: Port Washington Branch at Flushing–Main Street
Elder Avenue Queens Botanical Garden (Main Street)	Bidirectional	NYC Bus: Q20
Booth Memorial Avenue NewYork–Presbyterian/Queens (Main Street)	Bidirectional	NYC Bus: Q20
Horace Harding Expressway / 60th Avenue (Main Street)	Bidirectional	NYC Bus: Q20, Q88
146th Street / 63rd Avenue Queens College (Main Street)	Bidirectional	NYC Bus: Q20
Melbourne Avenue Queens College (Main Street)	Bidirectional	NYC Bus: Q20
Jewel Avenue (Main Street)	Bidirectional	NYC Bus: Q20; MTA Bus: Q64, Q74, QM4, QM44
73rd Avenue (Main Street)	Bidirectional	NYC Bus: Q20
Union Turnpike (Main Street)	Bidirectional	NYC Bus: Q20, Q45, Q46, Q48; MTA Bus: QM1, QM5, QM6, QM7, QM8, QM31, QM35, QM36
139th Street Archbishop Molloy High School (Main Street)	Southbound	NYC Bus: Q20
Queens Boulevard / Manton Street (Main Street)	Bidirectional	NYC Bus: Q20, QM63, QM64, QM68; MTA Bus: Q60, QM21; NYC Subway: trains at Briarwood; Note: Bronx-bound buses stop at Main Street and Manton Street; Jamaica-bound buses stop at Queens Boulevard and 84th Drive near Main Street.
Hillside Avenue (Sutphin Boulevard)	Bidirectional	NYC Bus: Q1, Q43, QM68; NYC Subway: train at Sutphin Boulevard
Jamaica Avenue (Sutphin Boulevard)	Bidirectional	NYC Bus: Q1, Q20, Q24, Q30, Q31, Q43, Q54, Q56, Q75 (Q30, Q31, Q75 westbound only); MTA Bus: Q6, Q8, Q9, Q25, Q40, Q41, Q60, Q65
Sutphin Boulevard (Archer Avenue)	Bidirectional	NYC Bus: Q1, Q20, Q24, Q30, Q31, Q43, Q44, Q54, Q56, Q75 (Q24, Q30, Q31, Q75 eastbound only); MTA Bus: Q6, Q8, Q9, Q25, Q40, Q41, Q60, Q65; NYC Subway: trains at Sutphin Boulevard–Archer Avenue–JFK Airport; LIRR / AirTrain JFK: Jamaica
153rd / 158th Streets Jamaica Center Bus Terminal (Archer Avenue)	Bidirectional	NYC Bus: Q4, Q5, Q20, Q24, Q30, Q31, Q42, Q54, Q56, Q83, Q84, Q85, Q86, Q87, Q89, Q75; MTA Bus: Q6, Q8, Q9, Q25, Q41, Q65, Q110, Q111, Q112, Q113, Q114, Q115; NICE Bus: n4, n4X; NYC Subway: trains at Jamaica Center–York College
Merrick Boulevard (Archer Avenue)	Southern terminus, northbound station	NYC Bus: Q4, Q5, Q17, Q20, Q30, Q31, Q84, Q85, Q86, Q87, Q89, Q75; NICE Bus: n4 At 168th Street Bus Terminal: NYC Bus: Q1, Q2, Q3, Q17, Q30, Q31, Q36, Q75, Q76, Q77, Q82; MTA Bus: Q6, Q8, Q9, Q41; NICE Bus: n1, n6, n22, n24, n26

=== B46 ===
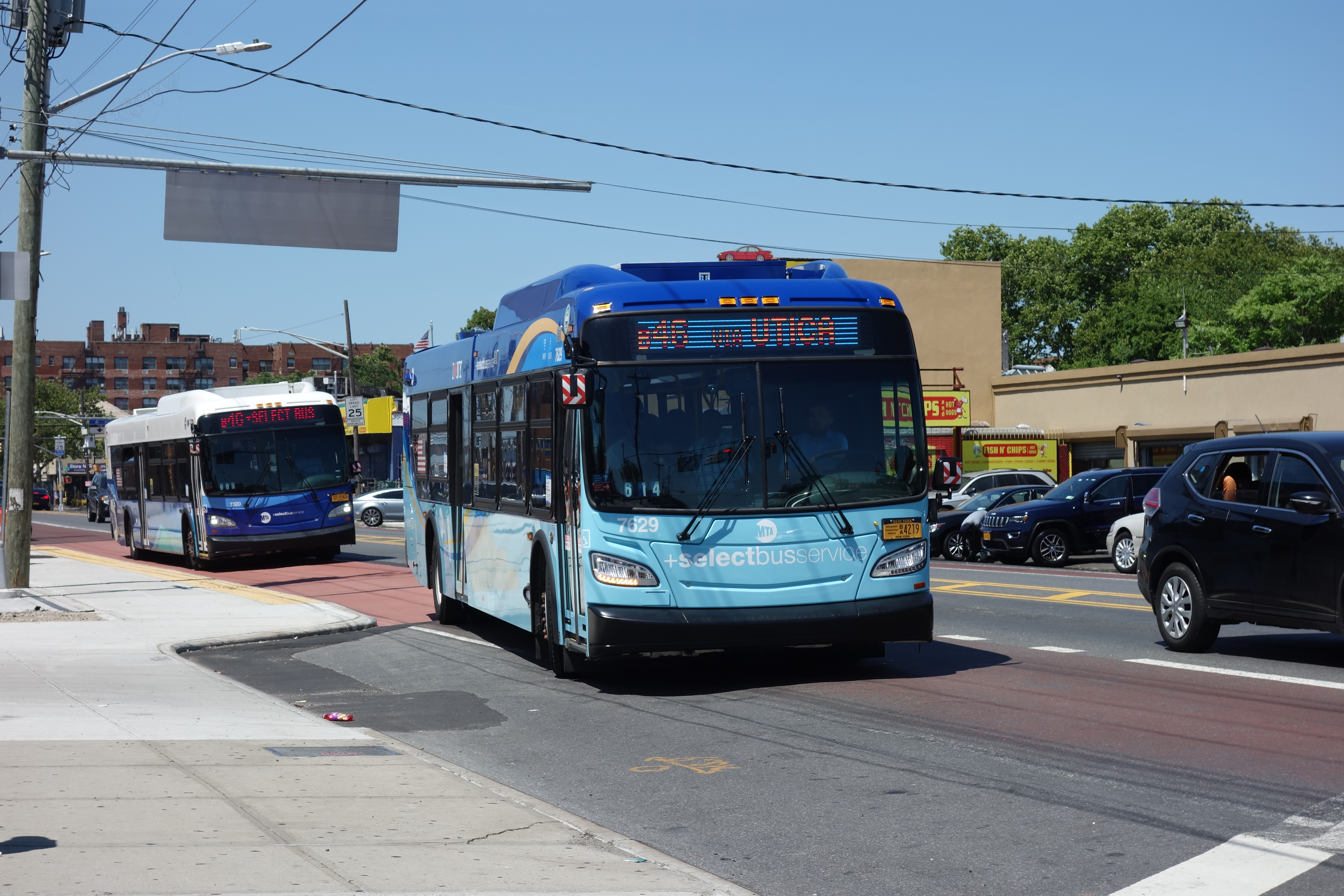
A bus on the B46 SBS route

The B46 line is the busiest bus route in Brooklyn and 3rd busiest in the entire city. Select Bus Service began in July 2016, after being originally scheduled for a fall 2015 implementation. The B46 SBS replaced the B46 Limited, making similar stops along Utica Avenue and Malcolm X Boulevard. Unlike the former Limited, the B46 SBS makes limited stops south of Avenue H, and only runs between Kings Plaza and DeKalb Avenue.

The B46 local was extended along Broadway to replace limited-stop service to the Williamsburg Bridge Plaza Bus Terminal at all times. Both the B46 local and Select Bus Service are based at the Flatbush Bus Depot, as is the B44 SBS. The B46 is the second Select Bus Service in Brooklyn, and the first one to not operate during late nights since the B44 in November 2013.

Station Street traveled	Direction	Connections
DeKalb Avenue Malcolm X Boulevard	Northbound terminus, Southbound station	NYC Bus: Q24, B38, B46 Local to Williamsburg Bridge Plaza, B47; NYC Subway: at Kosciuszko Street
Gates Avenue Malcolm X Boulevard	Bidirectional	NYC Bus: B46 Local, B52
Halsey Street Malcolm X Boulevard	Bidirectional	NYC Bus: B26, B46 Local
Fulton Street / Malcolm X Boulevard	Southbound	NYC Bus: B25, B46 Local; NYC Subway: trains at Utica Avenue
Fulton Street / Utica Avenue	Northbound	NYC Bus: B25, B46 Local; NYC Subway: trains at Utica Avenue
Eastern Parkway Utica Avenue	Bidirectional	NYC Bus: B14, B17, B45 (at St. Johns Place), B46 Local; NYC Subway: trains at Crown Heights–Utica Avenue
Empire Boulevard Utica Avenue	Bidirectional	NYC Bus: B12, B17, B46 Local
Winthrop Street Utica Avenue	Bidirectional	NYC Bus: B46 Local
Church Avenue Utica Avenue	Bidirectional	NYC Bus: B35, B46 Local
Avenue D Utica Avenue	Bidirectional	NYC Bus: B8, B46 Local
Avenue H Utica Avenue	Bidirectional	MTA Bus: B103, BM2; NYC Bus: B6, B7 (at Kings Highway), B46 Local
Flatlands Avenue Utica Avenue	Southbound	MTA Bus: BM1; NYC Bus: B46 Local, B82 Local, B82 SBS
Avenue K Utica Avenue	Northbound	MTA Bus: BM1; NYC Bus: B46 Local, B82 Local, B82 SBS
Avenue N Utica Avenue	Bidirectional	NYC Bus: B41, B46 Local
Kings Plaza Mall Flatbush Avenue & Avenue U	Southbound terminus, Northbound station	MTA Bus: Q35; NYC Bus: B2, B3, B9, B41, B46 Local, B47

=== Q70 ===
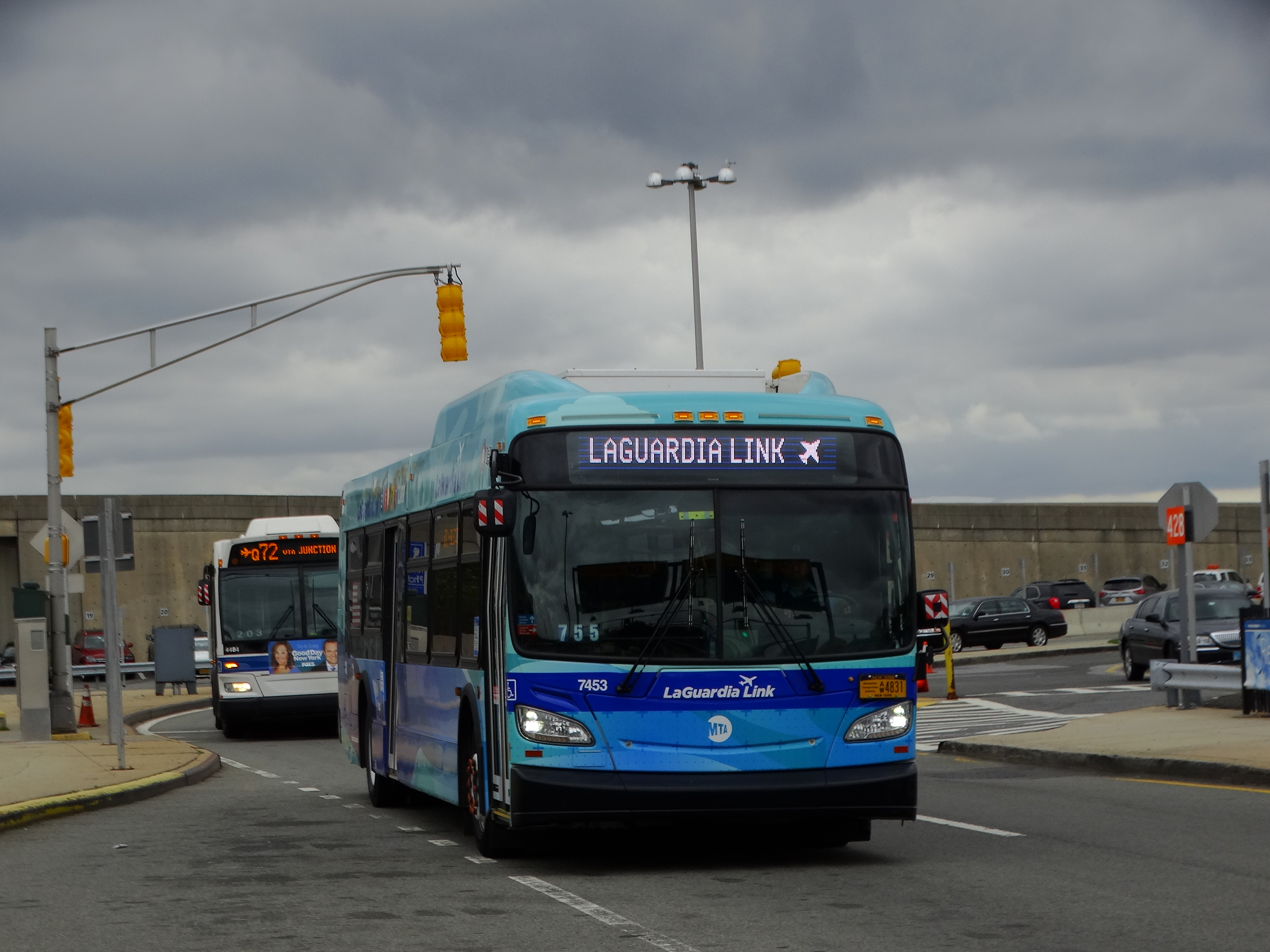
A bus on the Q70 SBS route

In Queens, the Q70 limited-stop bus between Woodside and LaGuardia Airport via the Roosevelt Avenue/74th Street subway station was implemented in September 2013, replacing the portion of the Q33 local bus that went to LaGuardia Airport. Although the Q70 was intended as a bus rapid transit project, it had yet to be branded as Select Bus Service and did not employ most SBS elements, as it lacked ticket machines, all-door boarding, branded buses, and dedicated bus lanes.

The Q70 SBS was implemented in September 2016, when it was rebranded as the "LaGuardia Link" with the implementation of off-board payment of fares. As opposed to other SBS routes, the Q70 is wrapped in a light blue scheme with clouds and airplanes on the top half of the bus imposed with the standard SBS livery on the lower half. No fares have been charged since May 2022.

The Q70, based at LaGuardia Depot, is the second Queens bus line to have Select Bus Service and the first one for MTA Bus.

Station Street traveled	Direction	Connections
61st Street (Woodside Avenue)	Southbound terminus	LIRR: City Terminal Zone, Port Washington Branch at Woodside; MTA Bus: Q18, Q32, Q53 SBS; NYC Subway: trains at 61st Street–Woodside
62nd Street (Roosevelt Avenue)	Northbound station	LIRR: City Terminal Zone, Port Washington Branch at Woodside; MTA Bus: Q18, Q32, Q53 SBS; NYC Subway: trains at 61st Street–Woodside
Victor A. Moore Bus Terminal (Roosevelt Avenue and 74th Street)	Bidirectional	MTA Bus: Q32, Q33, Q47, Q49, Q53 SBS; NYC Subway: trains at Jackson Heights–Roosevelt Avenue/74th Street
94th Street	Airport stop	MTA Bus: Q72; NYC Bus: M60 SBS
Terminal C	Airport stop	MTA Bus: Q72; NYC Bus: Q90, M60 SBS; LGA Shuttle Bus
Terminal B	Airport stop	MTA Bus: Q72; NYC Bus: Q90, M60 SBS; LGA Shuttle Bus
Notes: 1. The route loops around LaGuardia Airport terminal bus stops and continues toward the southbound terminus at Woodside. There is no northbound terminus stand.

=== M23 ===
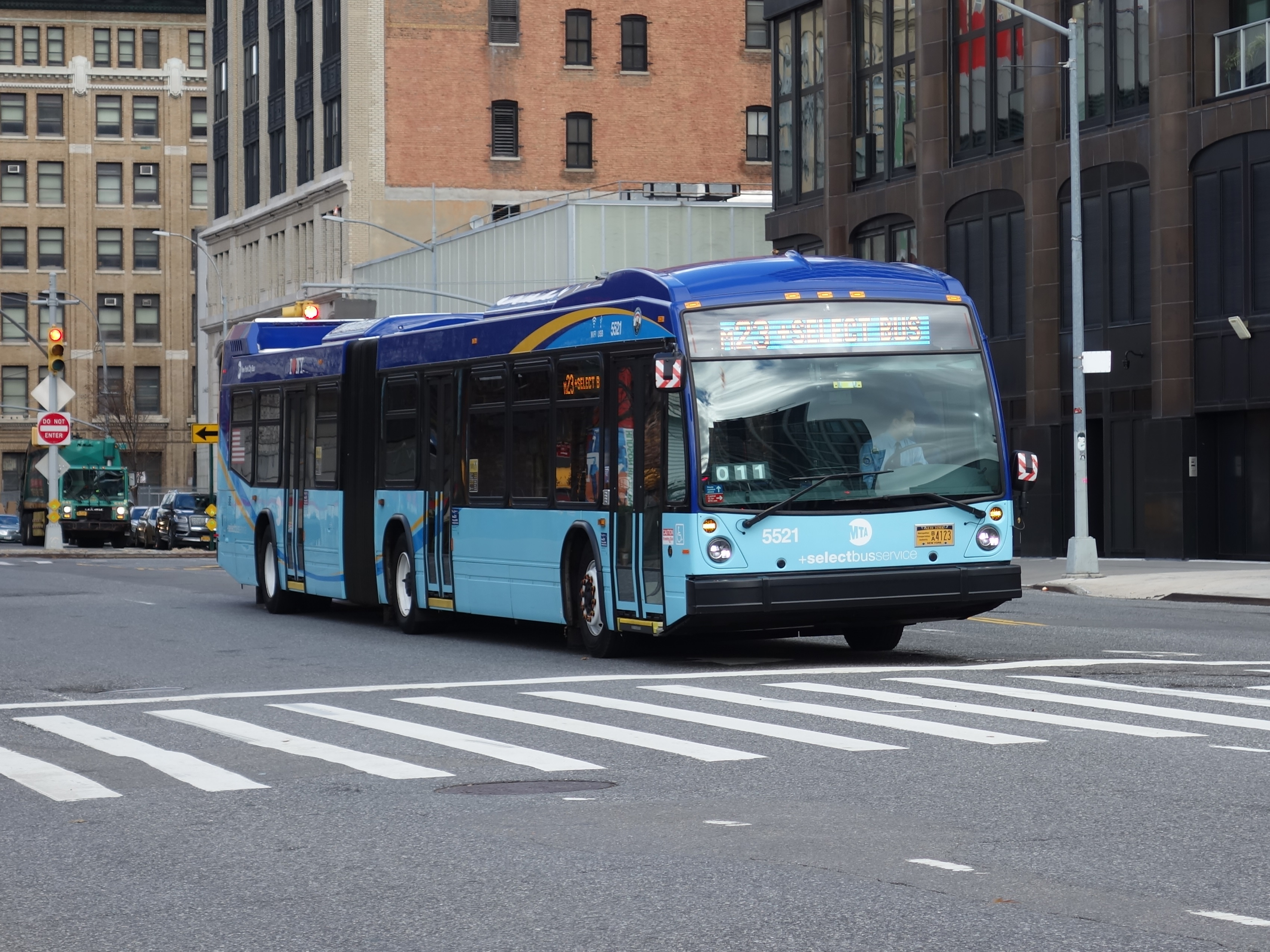
A bus on the M23 SBS route

The M23 route has been traditionally crowded, with 4,862,343 riders in 2010 and 3,831,755 riders in 2015, or 15,000 riders a day. In 2003, it was given the "Pokey Award" by the Straphangers Campaign, the least prestigious award given to other New York City Bus routes that also runs at a speed of 4 mph. It also got that distinction in 2007 when it also ran at an average of 4 miles per hour (6.4 km/h), slightly faster than the average walking speed of 3 miles per hour (4.8 km/h).

In 2009, the MTA and the New York City Department of Transportation (NYCDOT) identified the M14A/D, on parallel 14th Street, as a potential corridor for Phase II of SBS, the city's bus rapid transit system, as well as finalized plans to implement SBS on the M16/M34 along the also-parallel 34th Street. The crosstown bus corridors were noted for slow travel speeds. The M23 was originally not planned to be an SBS route, but in 2008, it had been part of a pilot program in which 30 articulated, redesigned SBS buses were rolled out on the M23 for some time.

After lengthy consultation, the M23 was converted to SBS in November 2016, replacing the identical local counterpart bus line. Unlike the former local line, the westbound stop on 5th Avenue and two bi-directional stops on Lexington Avenue are not served by this line. The M23 is based at the Michael J. Quill Bus Depot. It is the fifth corridor in Manhattan and the sixth Manhattan bus line to have Select Bus Service.

Station Street traveled	Direction	Connections
12th Avenue Chelsea Piers	Westbound terminus, Eastbound station	NYC Bus: M12 (northbound only)
12th Avenue West 24th Street	Bidirectional	NYC Bus: M12 (northbound only)
11th Avenue West 23rd Street	Bidirectional	NYC Bus: M12 (southbound only)
10th Avenue West 23rd Street	Bidirectional	NYC Bus: M11 (northbound only)
9th Avenue West 23rd Street	Bidirectional	NYC Bus: M11 (southbound only)
8th Avenue West 23rd Street	Bidirectional	NYC Bus: M20 (northbound only); NYC Subway: trains at 23rd Street
7th Avenue West 23rd Street	Bidirectional	NYC Bus: M7, M20 (southbound only); NYC Subway: trains at 23rd Street
6th Avenue West 23rd Street	Bidirectional	NYC Bus: M7, M55 (northbound only); NYC Subway: trains at 23rd Street; PATH: HOB-33, JSQ-33, and JSQ-33 (via HOB) at 23rd Street
Broadway East 23rd Street	Bidirectional	NYC Bus: M1, M2, M3, M55 (all buses southbound only); NYC Subway: trains at 23rd Street
Park Avenue South East 23rd Street	Bidirectional	NYC Bus: M1, M2, M3 (northbound only); NYC Subway: trains at 23rd Street–Baruch College
Third Avenue East 23rd Street	Bidirectional	NYC Bus: M101, M102, M103
Second Avenue East 23rd Street	Bidirectional	NYC Bus: M9, M15 Local, M15 SBS, M34A SBS (southbound only)
First Avenue East 23rd Street	Bidirectional	NYC Bus: M9, M15 Local, M15 SBS (northbound only), M34A SBS
Westbound only
First Avenue East 20th Street	Westbound	NYC Bus: M9, M15 Local (northbound only)
East 20th Street Loop East 20th Street	Westbound	NYC Bus: M9 (northbound only)
Eastbound only
East 23rd Street Avenue C	Eastbound	NYC Bus: M9, M34A SBS
East 20th Street Avenue C	Eastbound terminus, westbound station	NYC Bus: M9

=== M79 ===
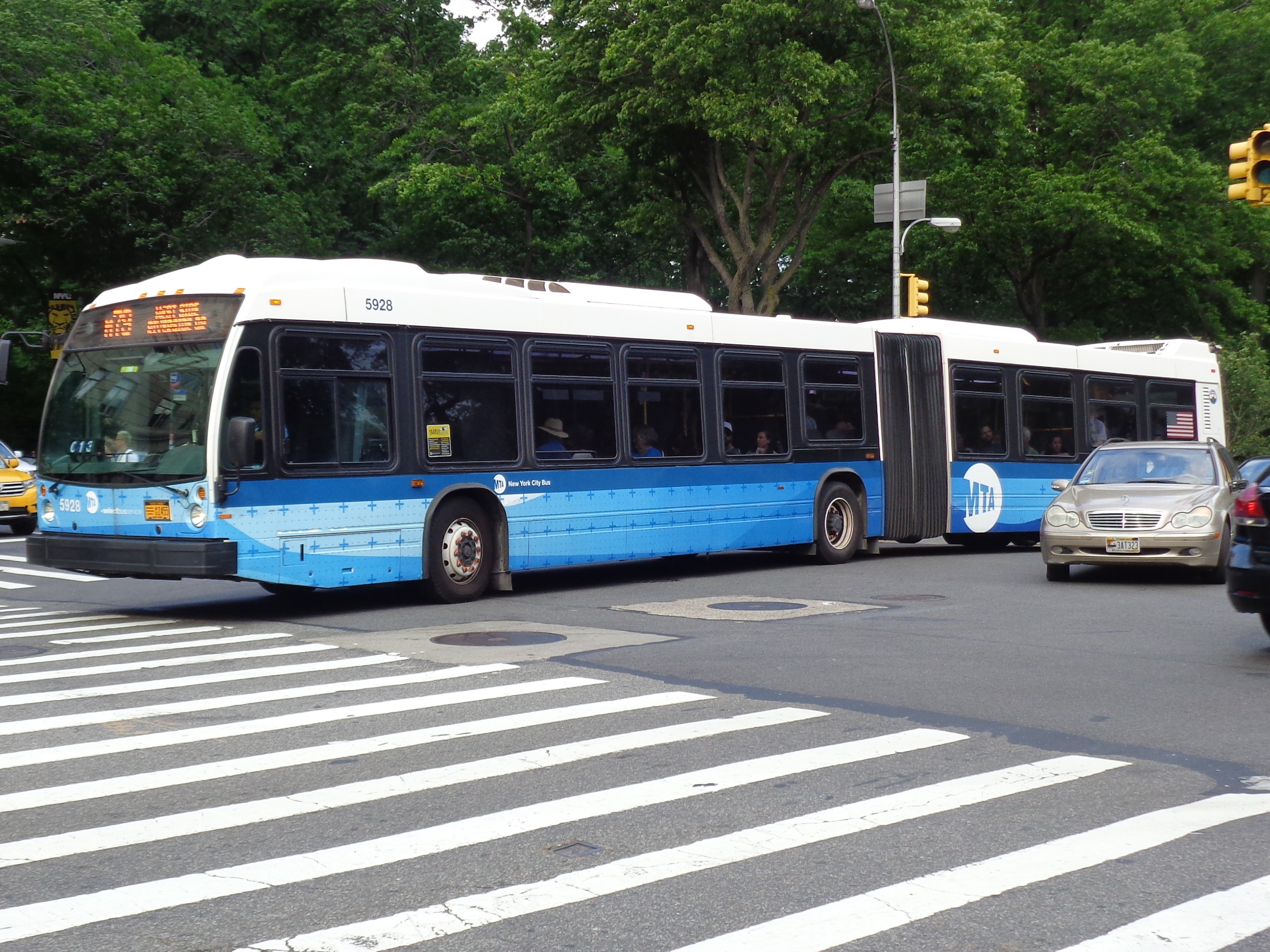
A westbound M79 SBS at 81st Street and Central Park West.

The M79 local bus route was identified as a heavily traveled corridor in a 2009 study by the DOT and NYCTA, and in a December 2013 study by the Pratt Center for Community Development of Brooklyn. It was converted to SBS in May 2017. The M79 is based at the Michael J. Quill Depot.

Station Street traveled	Direction	Connections
Riverside Drive West 79th Street	Westbound terminus, Eastbound station	NYC Bus: M5
Broadway West 79th Street	Bidirectional	NYC Bus: M104; NYC Subway: trains at 79th Street
West 79th Street Amsterdam Avenue	Eastbound	NYC Bus: M7, M11 (all buses northbound only)
Amsterdam Avenue West 79th Street	Westbound	NYC Bus: M7, M11 (all buses northbound only)
Columbus Avenue West 81st Street	Eastbound	NYC Bus: M7, M11 (all buses southbound only)
West 80th Street Columbus Avenue	Westbound	NYC Bus: M7, M11 (all buses southbound only)
Central Park West West 81st Street	Bidirectional	NYC Bus: M10; NYC Subway: trains at 81st Street–Museum of Natural History
Belvedere Castle 79th Street Transverse Road	Bidirectional	Note: MetroCard riders boarding at the Central Park Transverse stop will need to obtain their proof of fare payment receipt at the next stop (Central Park West or Fifth Ave depending on direction of travel). This restriction does not apply to OMNY users.
Fifth Avenue East 79th Street	Bidirectional	NYC Bus: M1, M2, M3, M4 (all buses southbound only)
Madison Avenue East 79th Street	Bidirectional	NYC Bus: M1, M2, M3, M4 (all buses northbound only)
Lexington Avenue East 79th Street	Bidirectional	NYC Bus: M98, M101, M102, M103 (all buses southbound only); NYC Subway: trains at 77th Street
Third Avenue East 79th Street	Bidirectional	NYC Bus: M98, M101, M102, M103 (all buses northbound only)
Second Avenue East 79th Street	Bidirectional	NYC Bus: M15 Local, M15 SBS (all buses southbound only)
First Avenue East 79th Street	Bidirectional	NYC Bus: M15 Local, M15 SBS (all buses northbound only)
East 79th Street York Avenue	Eastbound	NYC Bus: M31
York Avenue East 79th Street	Westbound	NYC Bus: M31
East End Avenue East 80th Street	Eastbound Terminus	
East End Avenue East 79th Street	Westbound Station	

=== Bx6 ===
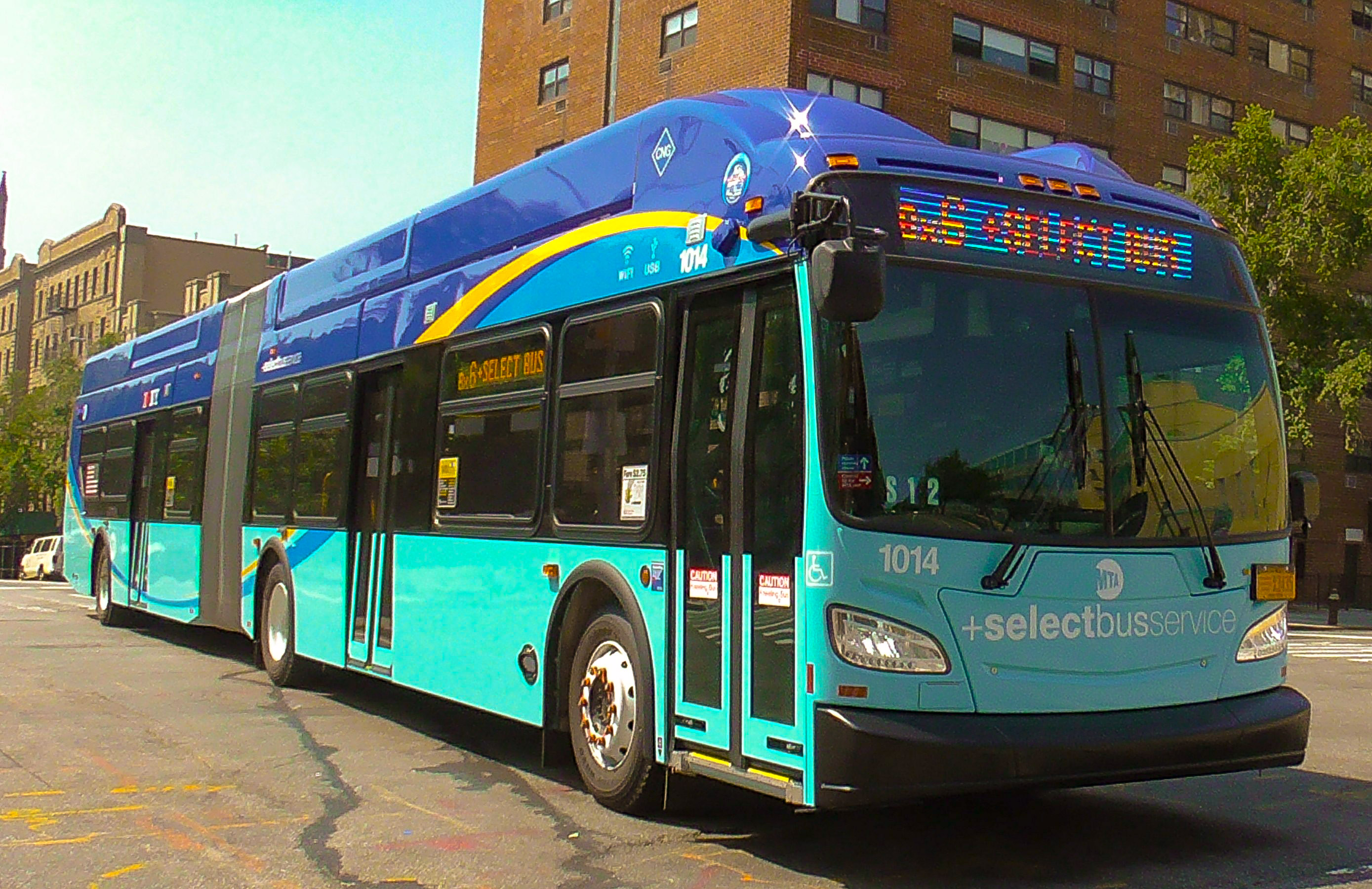
A bus on the Bx6 SBS route

In September 2017, the Bx6 SBS service was split from the existing Bx6 local service. The Bx6 SBS initially operated a similar route to the local, but the eastbound SBS route followed the westbound local route instead of exiting the Macombs Dam Bridge to Jerome Avenue. The Bx6 SBS supplements the existing Bx6 local service, making stops at select high-ridership locations and all transfers points to Metro-North and subways. In late 2019, it was announced that the Bx6 SBS route's eastern terminus would be relocated from Hunts Point to Soundview, along the path of the Bx5 route, with the change set to take effect in 2024 once MetroCard has been retired.

The Bx6 SBS is based at the West Farms Bus Depot, as is the Bx6 local. It is the third Bronx Bus line to have Select Bus Service and the first one since the Bx41 in June 2013, as well as the first SBS line to run a CNG Fleet. The Bx6 is the MTA's 15th Select Bus Service line to date.

The Bx6 corridor is the first to use bus lanes in the median of the street at the E 161st Street/Sheridan-Sherman Avenues stops, as opposed to curbside or offset bus lanes. The median bus lanes supposedly speeds up traffic by going around double-parked cars. Originally, a similar provision of median bus lanes was planned for the 34th Street Corridor in Manhattan. A planned "Busway" would have seen both the M34 and M34A SBS lines run along 34th Street in a special two-lane corridor with vehicular traffic travelling in only one direction (westbound after 6th Avenue/Broadway; eastbound after 5th Avenue), this was eventually scrapped and replaced with curbside and offset bus lanes along 34th Street with bus bulbs at selected bus stops (see above). The Bx6 SBS is 6.2 miles (10.0 km) long.

Station Street traveled	Direction	Connections
Manhattan
West 158th Street Riverside Drive	Westbound terminus, Eastbound station	NYC Bus: Bx6 Local
West 157th Street Edward M. Morgan Place	Eastbound	NYC Bus: M4, M5, Bx6 Local; NYC Subway: train at 157th Street
Edward M. Morgan Place West 157th Street	Westbound	NYC Bus: M4, M5, Bx6 Local; NYC Subway: train at 157th Street
Amsterdam Avenue West 155th Street	Bidirectional	NYC Bus: Bx6 Local, M3, M100, M101; NYC Subway: train at 155th Street
Macombs Dam Bridge
The Bronx
River Avenue East 161st Street	Bidirectional	NYC Bus: Bx6 Local, Bx13; NYC Subway: trains at 161st Street–Yankee Stadium; Metro-North: Hudson Line at Yankees–East 153rd Street (three blocks south on East 153rd Street)
Sherman Avenue / Sheridan Avenue East 161st Street	Bidirectional	NYC Bus: Bx1, Bx2 (all buses at Grand Concourse), Bx6 Local, Bx13 (Weekday Mornings Only)
Melrose Avenue East 161st Street	Bidirectional	NYC Bus: Bx6 Local, Bx13 (Weekday Mornings Only), Bx41 Local, Bx41 SBS; Metro-North: Harlem Line at Melrose (two blocks west on Park Avenue)
3rd Avenue East 163rd Street	Bidirectional	NYC Bus: Bx6 Local, Bx13 (Weekday Mornings Only), Bx15, Bx21
Prospect Avenue East 163rd Street	Bidirectional	NYC Bus: Bx6 Local, Bx17; NYC Subway: trains at Prospect Avenue (three blocks south on Westchester Avenue)
Intervale Avenue East 163rd Street	Bidirectional	NYC Bus: Bx4, Bx4A (all buses at Westchester Avenue), Bx6 Local; NYC Subway: trains at Intervale Avenue (one block north on Westchester Avenue)
Southern Boulevard / Bruckner Boulevard Hunts Point Avenue	Bidirectional	NYC Bus: Bx5, Bx6 Local, Bx19; NYC Subway: trains at Hunts Point Avenue
Garrison Avenue / Seneca Avenue Hunts Point Avenue	Bidirectional	NYC Bus: Bx6 Local
Coster Street Hunts Point Avenue	Eastbound	NYC Bus: Bx6 Local
Spofford Avenue Hunts Point Avenue	Westbound	NYC Bus: Bx6 Local
Spofford Avenue Halleck Street	Bidirectional	NYC Bus: Bx6 Local
Food Center Drive Halleck Street	Bidirectional	NYC Bus: Bx6 Local, Bx46
Eastbound only
Viele Avenue Halleck Street	Eastbound	NYC Bus: Bx6 Local, Bx46
Ryawa Avenue Halleck Street	Eastbound	NYC Bus: Bx6 Local, Bx46
Farragut Street Food Center Drive	Eastbound	NYC Bus: Bx6 Local, Bx46
Hunts Point Market Food Center Drive	Eastbound	NYC Bus: Bx6 Local, Bx46
Baldor Food Center Drive	Eastbound	NYC Bus: Bx6 Local, Bx46
Westbound only
Market Street Food Center Drive	Eastbound Terminus; Westbound Station	NYC Bus: Bx6 Local, Bx46

=== Q52 and Q53 ===
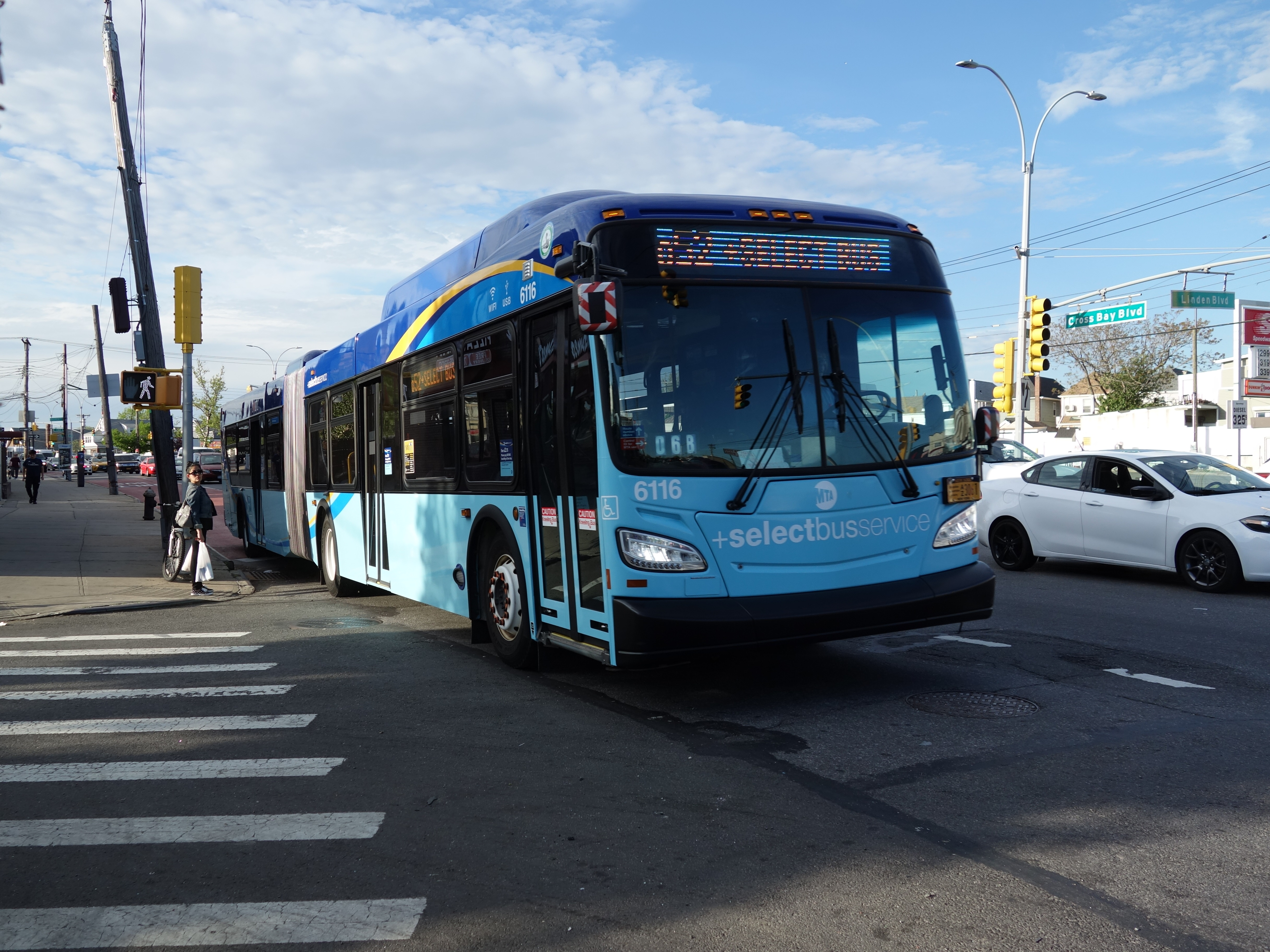
A bus on the Q52 SBS route

The Q52 and Q53 buses were converted to Select Bus Lines in November 2017. The Q52 SBS is based at the JFK Depot, while the Q53 SBS is based at the LaGuardia Depot. They are the 3rd and 4th Queens bus lines, and the 2nd and 3rd MTA Bus bus lines, to be converted into Select Bus Service.

Station Street traveled	Direction	Connections
Q53 only
61st Street Roosevelt Avenue	Northbound Terminus; Southbound Station	LIRR: City Terminal Zone, Port Washington Branch at Woodside; MTA Bus: Q18, Q32, Q70 SBS to LaGuardia Airport; NYC Subway: trains at 61st Street–Woodside
75th Street Broadway	Bidirectional	MTA Bus: Q32, Q33, Q47, Q49, Q70 SBS; NYC Subway: trains at Roosevelt Avenue/74th Street
78th Street Broadway	Southbound	
Baxter Avenue Broadway	Northbound	
Whitney Avenue Broadway	Bidirectional	NYC Subway: trains at Elmhurst Avenue
Justice Avenue Broadway	Northbound	NYC Bus: Q58, Q59, Q98; MTA Bus: Q60; NYC Subway: trains at Grand Avenue–Newtown
Queens Boulevard Broadway	Southbound	NYC Bus: Q58, Q59, Q98; MTA Bus: Q60; NYC Subway: trains at Grand Avenue–Newtown
Q52 and Q53
Woodhaven Boulevard / Queens Center Queens Boulevard	Q52 Northbound Terminus; Q53 Northbound	NYCT Bus: Q14, Q29, Q59, Q88, Q98; MTA Bus: Q11, Q60, QM10, QM11, QM12, QM40, QM42; NYC Subway: trains at Woodhaven Boulevard
Woodhaven Boulevard Hoffman Drive	Q52 Southbound Station; Q53 Southbound	NYCT Bus: Q14, Q29, Q59, Q88, Q98; MTA Bus: Q11, Q60, QM10, QM11, QM12, QM40, QM42; NYC Subway: trains at Woodhaven Boulevard
Penelope Avenue Woodhaven Boulevard	Southbound	NYCT Bus: Q38; MTA Bus: Q11, BM5, QM15
63rd Drive Woodhaven Boulevard	Northbound	NYCT Bus: Q38; MTA Bus: Q11, BM5, QM15
Metropolitan Avenue Woodhaven Boulevard	Bidirectional	MTA Bus: Q11, Q23, QM12, QM15, QM42; NYC Bus: Q54
Myrtle Avenue Woodhaven Boulevard	Bidirectional	MTA Bus: Q11, BM5, QM15; NYC Bus: Q55
Jamaica Avenue Woodhaven Boulevard	Bidirectional	MTA Bus: Q11, QM15; NYC Bus: Q56; NYC Subway: trains at Woodhaven Boulevard
91st Avenue Woodhaven Boulevard	Bidirectional	MTA Bus: Q11; NYC Bus: Q24 (at Atlantic Avenue)
101st Avenue Woodhaven Boulevard	Bidirectional	MTA Bus: Q8, Q11, QM15
Rockaway Boulevard Woodhaven Boulevard	Southbound	MTA Bus: Q7, Q11, Q41, Q51, Q112, QM15; NYC Subway: train at Rockaway Boulevard
Liberty Avenue Cross Bay Boulevard	Northbound	MTA Bus: Q7, Q11, Q41, Q51, Q112, QM15; NYC Subway: train at Rockaway Boulevard
Pitkin Avenue Cross Bay Boulevard	Bidirectional	MTA Bus: Q11, Q41, BM5, QM15
157th Avenue Cross Bay Boulevard	Bidirectional	MTA Bus: Q41, QM15, QM16, QM17
163rd Avenue Cross Bay Boulevard	Bidirectional	MTA Bus: Q41, QM15, QM16, QM17 (southbound only)
Joseph P. Addabbo Memorial Bridge
Broad Channel
Jamaica Bay Wildlife Refuge Cross Bay Boulevard	Bidirectional	
Noel Road Cross Bay Boulevard	Bidirectional	MTA Bus: QM15, QM16, QM17; NYC Subway: trains at Broad Channel
East 16th Road Cross Bay Boulevard	Northbound	
West 17th Road Cross Bay Boulevard	Southbound	
Cross Bay Veterans Memorial Bridge
Rockaway Peninsula
Q52 only
Beach 92nd Street Rockaway Beach Boulevard	Southbound	MTA Bus: Q22, QM15, QM17; NYC Subway: trains at Beach 90th Street
Beach 91st Street Rockaway Beach Boulevard	Northbound	MTA Bus: Q22, QM15, QM17; NYC Subway: trains at Beach 90th Street
Beach 84th Street Rockaway Beach Boulevard	Bidirectional	MTA Bus: Q22, QM15, QM17
Beach 74th Street Rockaway Beach Boulevard	Southbound	MTA Bus: Q22, QM15, QM17
Beach 73rd Street Rockaway Beach Boulevard	Northbound	MTA Bus: Q22, QM15, QM17
Beach 67th Street Rockaway Beach Boulevard	Bidirectional	NYC Subway: train at Beach 67th Street
Beach 59th Street Arverne Boulevard	Southbound	NYC Subway: train at Beach 60th Street
Rockaway Beach Boulevard Beach 59th Street	Northbound	NYC Subway: train at Beach 60th Street
Beach Channel Drive Beach 54th Street	Southbound	MTA Bus: Q22, QM15, QM17
Beach 54th Street Beach Channel Drive	Northbound	MTA Bus: Q22, QM15, QM17
Beach Channel Drive Beach 51st Street	Southbound Terminus	MTA Bus: Q22, QM15, QM17
Beach 51st Street Beach Channel Drive	Northbound Station	MTA Bus: Q22, QM15, QM17
Q53 only
Beach 96th Street Rockaway Beach Boulevard	Bidirectional	MTA Bus: Q22, QM16; NYC Subway: trains at Beach 98th Street
Beach 102nd Street Rockaway Beach Boulevard	Bidirectional	MTA Bus: Q22, QM16
Beach 108th Street Rockaway Beach Boulevard	Bidirectional	MTA Bus: Q22, QM16
Rockaway Beach Boulevard Beach 116th Street	Southbound Terminus; Northbound Station	MTA Bus: Q22, Q35, QM16 (at Newport Avenue); NYC Subway: trains at Rockaway Park–Beach 116th Street

=== B82 ===
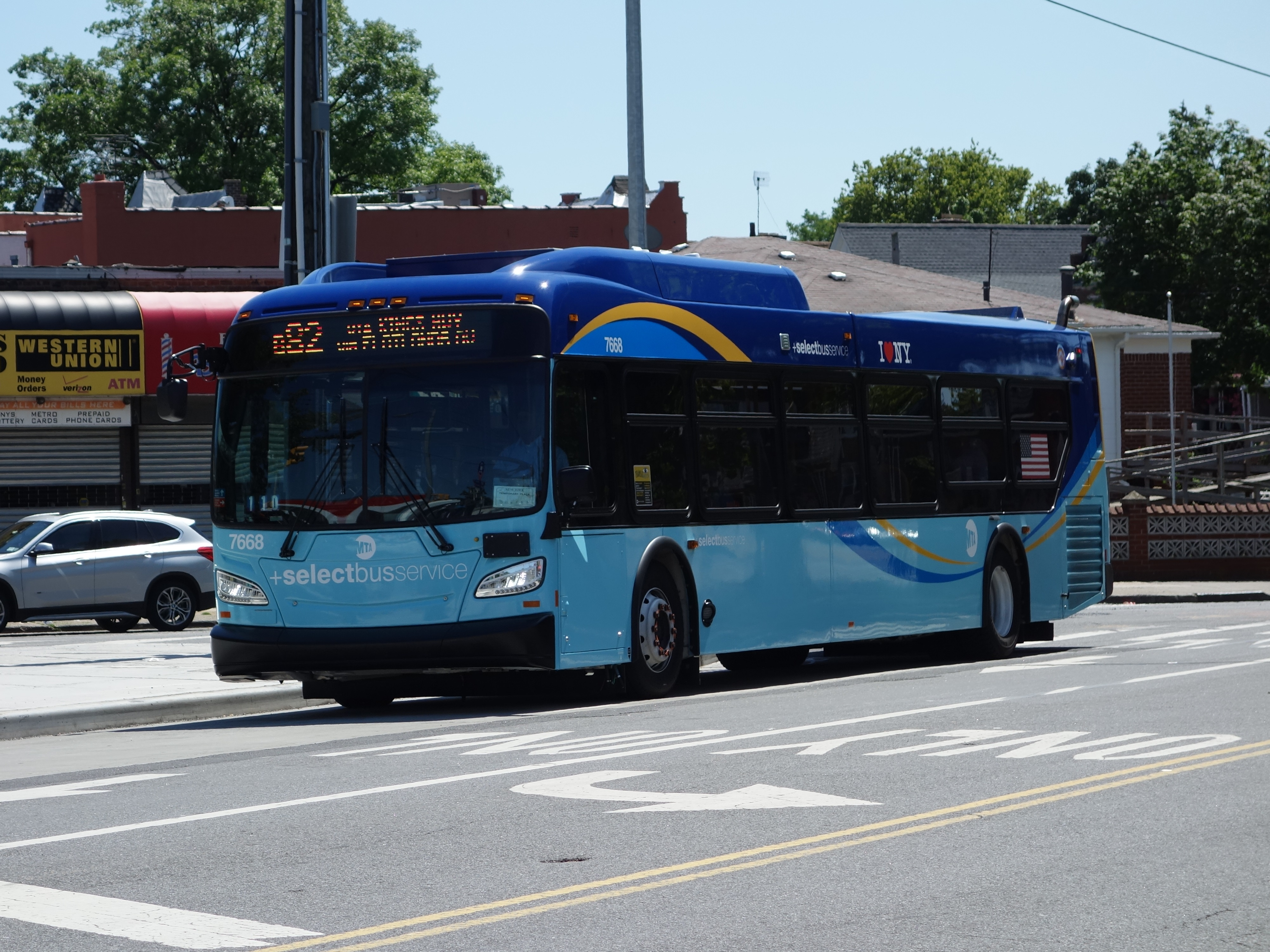
A bus on the B82 SBS route

The B82 Limited was converted to Select Bus Service in October 2018. The B82 SBS did not replace limited service between Bay 37th St and Coney Island. The B82 is the 3rd Brooklyn bus line (the MTA's 18th) to have Select Bus Service, and the only SBS line to run on weekdays only. Service on late nights and weekends is provided by the B82 local. The B82 SBS is based at the East New York Depot.

Station Street traveled	Direction	Connections
Pennsylvania Avenue Seaview Avenue	Northbound Terminus; Southbound Station	NYC Bus: B82 Local, B83; MTA Bus: BM2, BM5
Schroeders Avenue Pennsylvania Avenue	Bidirectional	NYC Bus: B82 Local, B83; MTA Bus: BM2, BM5
Vandalia Avenue Pennsylvania Avenue	Bidirectional	NYC Bus: B82 Local, B83; MTA Bus: BM2, BM5
Louisiana Avenue Flatlands Avenue	Bidirectional	NYC Bus: B82 Local; MTA Bus: BM2
East 105th Street Flatlands Avenue	Bidirectional	NYC Bus: B60 to Williamsburg Bridge Plaza, B82 Local; MTA Bus: B103 Limited, BM2
Rockaway Parkway Glenwood Road	Bidirectional	NYC Bus: B6, B17 (rush hours only), B42 to Canarsie Pier, B60, B82 Local; NYC Subway: train at Canarsie–Rockaway Parkway
Remsen Av Flatlands Avenue	Bidirectional	NYC Bus: B6, B17, B82 Local
East 82nd Street Flatlands Avenue	Southbound	NYC Bus: B6, B82 Local; MTA Bus: B103 Limited, BM2
East 80th Street Flatlands Avenue	Northbound	NYC Bus: B6, B82 Local; MTA Bus: B103 Limited, BM2
Ralph Avenue Flatlands Avenue	Bidirectional	NYC Bus: B6, B47, B82 Local
Utica Avenue Flatlands Avenue	Bidirectional	NYC Bus: B46 local, B46 SBS, B82 Local; MTA Bus: BM1
Avenue K Kings Highway	Bidirectional	NYC Bus: B7; MTA Bus: BM1
Flatbush Avenue Kings Highway	Bidirectional	NYC Bus: B7, B9, B41, B82 Local; MTA Bus: Q35
Nostrand Avenue Kings Highway	Bidirectional	NYC Bus: B7, B44 local, B44 SBS, B82 Local; MTA Bus: BM4
Ocean Avenue Avenue P	Southbound	NYC Bus: B7, B49, B82 Local; MTA Bus: BM3
Ocean Avenue Kings Highway	Northbound	NYC Bus: B7, B49, B82 Local; MTA Bus: BM3
East 16th Street Kings Highway	Bidirectional	NYC Bus: B2, B7, B31, B82 Local; MTA Bus: B100; NYC Subway: trains at Kings Highway
Coney Island Avenue Kings Highway	Bidirectional	NYC Bus: B7, B68, B82 Local
McDonald Avenue Kings Highway	Bidirectional	NYC Bus: B82 Local; NYC Subway: trains at Kings Highway
West 7th Street Kings Highway	Northbound	NYC Bus: B82 Local; NYC Subway: trains at Kings Highway
West 8th Street Kings Highway	Southbound	NYC Bus: B82 Local; NYC Subway: trains at Kings Highway
78th Street Bay Parkway	Northbound	NYC Bus: B4 at Stillwell Avenue, B6, B82 Local
79th Street Bay Parkway	Southbound	NYC Bus: B4 at Stillwell Avenue, B6, B82 Local
86th Street Bay Parkway	Bidirectional	NYC Bus: B1, B6, B82 Local; NYC Subway: trains at Bay Parkway
Bath Avenue Bay Parkway	Bidirectional	NYC Bus: B6, B64, B82 Local
Bay 37th Street Crospey Avenue	Northbound	NYC Bus: B3 to Bergen Beach, B6 to East New York, B64, B82 Local to Coney Island, X28/X38
Bay 38th Street Crospey Avenue	Southbound Terminus	NYC Bus: B3 to Bergen Beach, B6 to East New York, B64, B82 Local to Coney Island, X28/X38

=== M14A and M14D ===
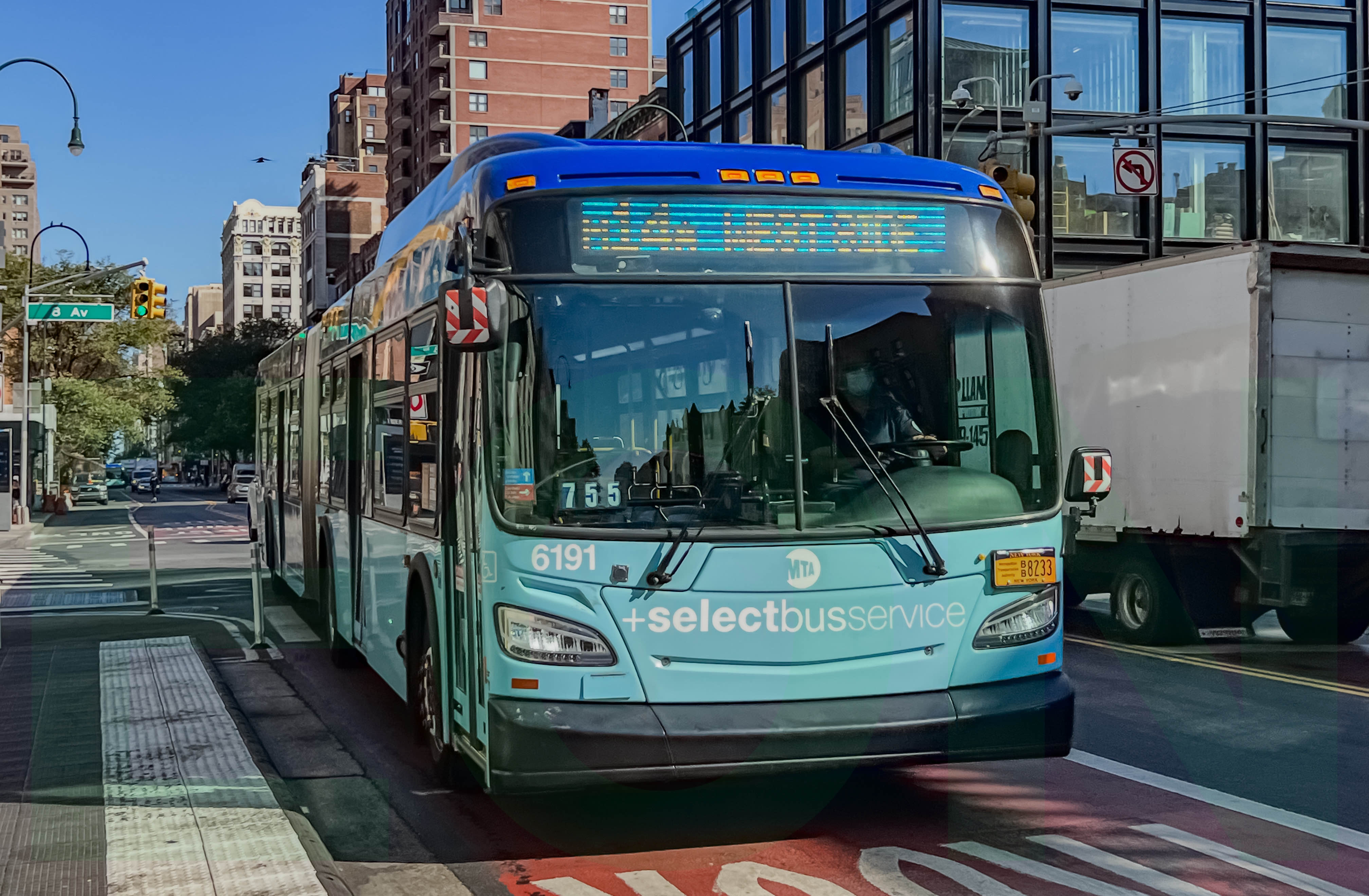

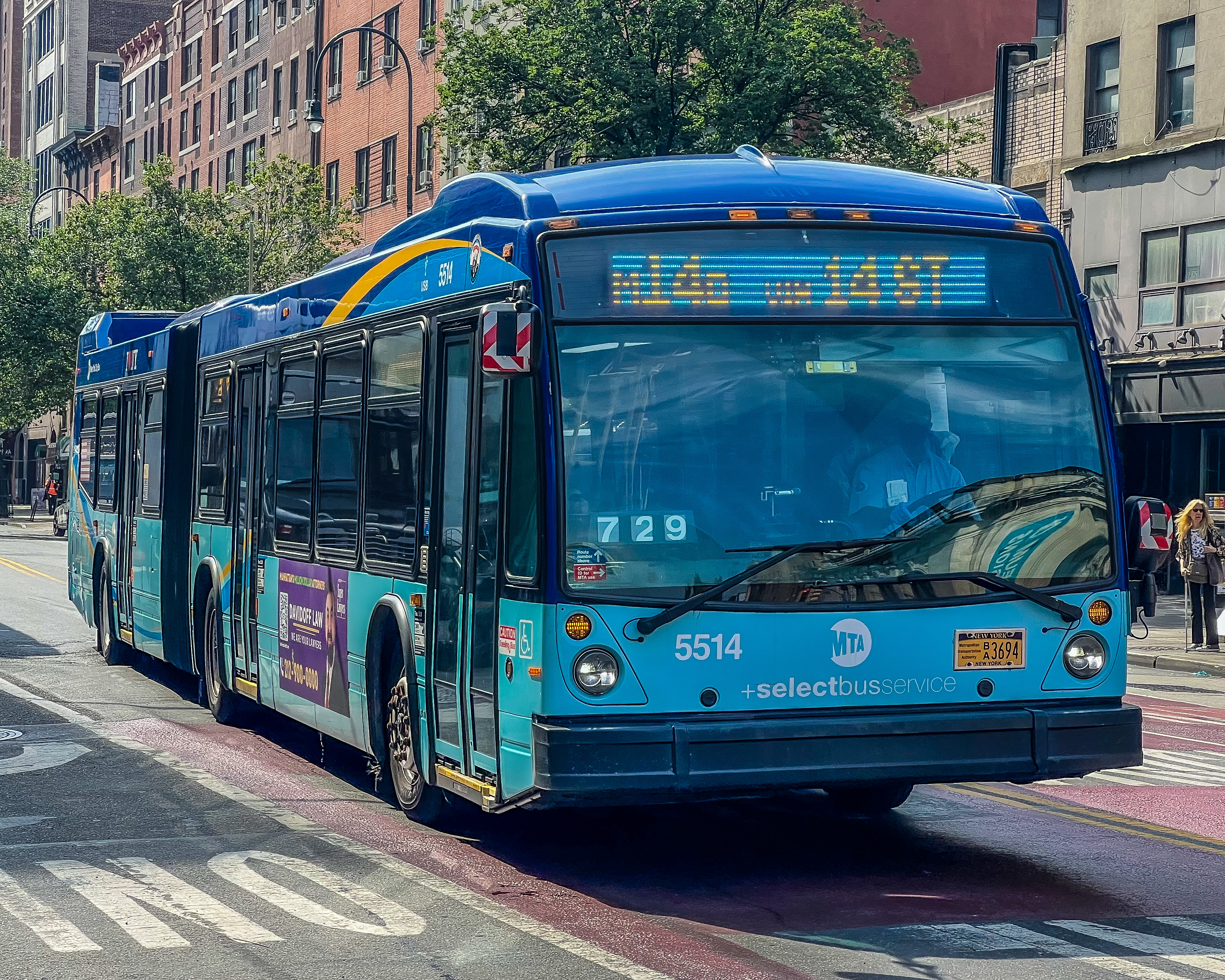
An M14A SBS and M14D SBS on 14th Street in 2022 and 2024, respectively

A temporary M14 Select Bus Service route was scheduled to be implemented in January 2019, in preparation for the full 14th Street Tunnel shutdown. Following the alteration in the 14th Street Tunnel rehabilitation plans in January 2019, the M14 SBS was put on hold. Later, it was announced that the M14A/D routes themselves would be converted to SBS, replacing their former local versions. The M14A/D SBS routes were implemented in July 2019. These are the first Bus routes to take advantage of an Exclusive 14th Street Busway that went into effect in October 2019. Both the M14A and M14D are based at Michael J. Quill Bus Depot and are both the 8th and 9th Manhattan bus lines, and the MTA’s 19th and 20th bus lines overall, to have Select Bus Service, respectively.

Station Street traveled	Direction	Connections
M14A only
Bleecker Street Eighth Avenue	Eastbound station	NYC Bus: M20 to Lincoln Center
West 12th Street Hudson Street	Westbound terminus	NYC Bus: M12 to Columbus Circle M11 to Riverbank State Park
West 13th Street Hudson Street	Westbound	NYC Bus: M11, M12 to Abingdon Square
M14D only
Eleventh Avenue West 18th Street	Westbound terminus; eastbound station	NYC Bus: M12 to Columbus Circle
Eleventh Avenue West 15th Street	Westbound	NYC Bus: M12 to Columbus Circle
Tenth Avenue West 14th Street	Westbound	NYC Bus: M12 to Columbus Circle M11 to Riverbank State Park
Ninth Avenue West 14th Street	Westbound	NYC Bus: M12 to Columbus Circle M11 to Riverbank State Park
Tenth Avenue West 18th Street	Eastbound	NYC Bus: M12 to Abingdon Square
West 18th Street Ninth Avenue	Eastbound	NYC Bus: M11, M12 to Abingdon Square
Hudson Street West 14th Street	Eastbound	
M14A and M14D
Eighth Avenue West 14th Street	Bidirectional	NYC Bus: M12 to Columbus Circle, M20 to Lincoln Center; NYC Subway: trains at 14th Street/Eighth Avenue
Seventh Avenue West 14th Street	Bidirectional	NYC Bus: M20 to South Ferry; NYC Subway: trains at 14th Street/Sixth Avenue
Sixth Avenue West 14th Street	Bidirectional	NYC Bus: M7 to Harlem at West 17th Street, M55 to West 44th Street/Sixth Avenue; NYC Subway: trains at 14th Street/Sixth Avenue; PATH: HOB–33, JSQ–33, JSQ–33 (via HOB) trains at 14th Street
Fifth Avenue West 14th Street	Westbound	NYC Bus: M1, M2, M3 to East Village, M55 to South Ferry
Union Square West/University Place East 14th Street	Bidirectional	
Irving Place East 14th Street	Bidirectional	NYC Bus: M1 to Harlem, M2 to Washington Heights, M3 to Fort George; NYC Subway: trains at 14th Street–Union Square
Third Avenue East 14th Street	Bidirectional	NYC Bus: M101, M102, M103; NYC Subway: train at Third Avenue
Second Avenue East 14th Street	Bidirectional	NYC Bus: M15 Local to South Ferry, M15 SBS to South Ferry
First Avenue East 14th Street	Bidirectional	NYC Bus: M15 Local to East Harlem, M15 SBS to East Harlem; NYC Subway: train at First Avenue
Avenue A East 14th Street	Bidirectional	NYC Subway: train at First Avenue
M14A only
East 11th Street Avenue A	Bidirectional	NYC Bus: M8 at East 10th Street
East 5th Street Avenue A	Bidirectional	
East Houston Street Avenue A	Bidirectional	NYC Bus: M9, M21
Delancey Street Essex Street	Bidirectional	NYC Bus: M9, B39; NYC Subway: trains at Delancey Street/Essex Street
Grand Street Essex Street	Bidirectional	NYC Bus: M9
Clinton Street Grand Street	Bidirectional	
Pitt Street Grand Street	Bidirectional	
East Broadway Grand Street	Eastbound	
Jackson Street Grand Street	Eastbound	
Columbia Street Grand Street	Westbound	
Madison Street Jackson Street	Westbound	NYC Bus: M22
FDR Drive Grand Street	Eastbound terminus; Westbound station	NYC Bus: M22 to Battery Park City
M14D only
Avenue B East 14th Street	Bidirectional	
Avenue C East 14th Street	Bidirectional	NYC Bus: M9
East 11th/12th Streets Avenue C	Bidirectional	NYC Bus: M8 at East 10th Street, M9
Avenue D East 10th Street	Bidirectional	NYC Bus: M8 to West Village
East 5th/6th Streets Avenue D	Bidirectional	
East 4th Street Avenue D	Eastbound	
East Houston Street Avenue D	Westbound	NYC Bus: M21
Columbia Street East Houston Street	Eastbound	NYC Bus: M21 to Lower East Side
Mangin Street East Houston Street	Eastbound	NYC Bus: M21 to Lower East Side
555 FDR Drive FDR Drive	Eastbound	NYC Bus: M21 to Lower East Side
FDR Drive Delancey Street	Eastbound	
Rivington Street Columbia Street	Westbound station	NYC Bus: M21 to Soho
Columbia Street Delancey Street	Eastbound terminus; Westbound station	NYC Bus: M21 to Soho

== Future routes ==
Other Select Bus Service routes are planned for the near future as part of the continuation of Phase II, including neighborhoods underserved by rapid transit and heavily used express bus routes. These were identified during a 2009 study by the DOT and MTA, in a December 2013 study by the Pratt Center for Community Development of Brooklyn, and in a 2017 by the DOT and MTA. Twenty-one routes are expected to be added to the SBS system between October 2017 and 2027.

=== Corridors chosen for implementation ===
The M96 was set to become the next route to be converted to Select Bus Service after the M14, with implementation set for 2019, but was pushed back due to budget constraints. Bus lanes will be added to 96th Street, bus stops will be consolidated and signal timing will be changed along the street as part of the Better Buses Action Plan, which was unveiled on April 19, 2019, making it one of the next corridors to become SBS. The MTA bus network redesign's route type distribution has a new route type called "Crosstown/SBS", which all current SBS routes fall under. The MTA is planning to upgrade some existing routes into the route type (B41 Limited) and create some new ones (B55 (current B35 Limited, but extended to JFK Airport)).

The Q25 or Q34 Limited, running primarily along Parsons and Kissena Boulevards in Queens, has been proposed for conversion to Select Bus Service. The corridor was one of the possible future corridors identified in the 2017 announcement about the SBS system's expansion. Other potential routes such as the B41 have undergone preliminary studies and community outreach, but have yet to be considered for implementation.

As part of the 2026 report Next Stop: Fast Buses, Better Service, 50 corridors were listed as priority corridors for bus infrastructure improvements, which were based on where bus riders experiences the most delays on their journey and considered bus speeds, ridership, reliability, time for journeys and access to other transit modes. Additionally, five corridors were selected for rapid bus features.

These corridors include:

1. Flatbush Avenue (current B41)
2. Northern Boulevard West (current Q63, Q66)
3. Tremont Avenue/Cross Bronx (current Bx36, Bx40, Bx42)
4. Kensington-JFK (current B15, B35)
5. Utica Avenue (current B46)

=== Potential corridors ===
Below are potential corridors and neighborhoods listed under the 2009 study, current Phase II plans that have not already been implemented, and from the 2017 study. As of Spring 2019, all future proposals, except for the North Shore BRT study, have been postponed, while awaiting the Bus System Redesign.

Corridors and Neighborhoods include:

1. Middle Village (current Q29, Q47)
2. Jamaica / Hillside Avenue Corridor (current Q1, Q36, Q43, Q82, Q110)
3. Southeast Queens (current Q4, Q5, Q84, Q85, Q86, Q87, and Q89 routes)
4. Southeast Queens (current Q113 and Q114 routes)
5. Union Turnpike (current Q45, Q46 and Q48 routes)
6. Flatbush Avenue Corridor (current B41)
7. Multiple Southern Brooklyn East-West Corridors (current B6 and B82): B82 implemented on October 1, 2018.
8. Manhattan West Side – Amsterdam Avenue/135th Street to Hudson Street/8th Avenue (current M11)
9. Broadway to Central Bronx (current Bx9)
10. University Avenue (current Bx3)
11. Tremont Avenue (current Bx40 and Bx42 routes)
12. Harlem to Southern Boulevard (current Bx19)
13. Soundview to Washington Heights (current Bx36)
14. 96th Street Crosstown (current M96); planned
15. Church Avenue (current B35)
16. Ridgewood to Flushing (current Q58 and Q98)
17. Flushing to Cambria Heights via Springfield Boulevard (current Q27)
18. Queens Access to JFK (current Q10 and Q80)
19. The Hub to Fordham Plaza (current Bx15)
20. Gun Hill Road Corridor (current Bx28, Bx38); Bx28 proposed for future conversion
21. Bedford Park to Co-Op City (current Bx25 and Bx26)
22. Seagate to Sheepshead Bay (current B36)

High-volume express bus corridors include:

1. Major Deegan Expressway (I-87)
2. Bruckner Expressway (I-278)
3. Long Island Expressway (I-495)
4. Gowanus Expressway (I-278)
5. Staten Island Expressway (I-278)

"Difficult trips", trips that are difficult to make and/or require many transfers, as identified by the MTA:

1. 14th Street Crosstown Corridor – 23rd Street/11th Avenue to Grand Street/Avenue D (current M14A/M14D); implemented July 1, 2019.
2. Jamaica to Flushing Corridor: Q25 Limited was proposed for future conversion.
3. Bushwick to Downtown Brooklyn Corridor (current B38 and B54)
4. Central Brooklyn East-West Corridor
5. Southern Brooklyn East-West Corridor – Bay Ridge to JFK Airport (current B6, and B82 routes)
6. Northern Boulevard Flushing – Manhattan Corridor via Queensboro Bridge: Q63 and Q66 is proposed for future conversion.

The following subway lines have been flagged for being at or above 95% of New York City Subway loading guidelines during rush hours:

1. Broadway–Seventh Avenue 2 and 3 trains
2. Lexington Avenue 4, 5, 6, and <6> trains
3. Queens-Manhattan connections: 7, E, N, and W trains

Areas that are undergoing or may undergo significant growth in housing units and that have limited transit access:

1. South Bronx: Bx6 SBS was implemented on September 3, 2017.
2. Queens East River waterfront
3. Brooklyn East River waterfront
4. Western Shore/Southern Shore (Charleston, Tottenville) of Staten Island

Additional Study Areas include:

1. North Shore of Staten Island (Current S40 and S90 routes; former North Shore Branch of Staten Island Railway); being studied by the MTA

There are also "tiered" corridors based on importance, identified in the Pratt Center report in December 2013 and a previous report from 2007.

"First-tiered" corridors:

1. LaGuardia–Woodhaven/Cross Bay–Rockaway (Queens); Combination of current Q72 and Q52/Q53 routes.
  1. Q52/Q53 LTD (Woodhaven & Cross Bay Boulevards) converted on November 12, 2017.
2. North Shore (Staten Island); Current S40, S90 routes; former North Shore Branch of Staten Island Railway
3. Industry City/Sunset Park–Linden–JFK (Brooklyn–Queens); B35 route and eastern portion of the B15 route (proposed as B55 SBS in Brooklyn bus redesign, but ends in Kensington instead of Sunset Park).

"Second-tiered" corridors:

1. Far Rockaway–Jamaica (Queens); Current Q113 and Q114 routes
2. Bush Terminal/Sunset Park–JFK via Southeast Brooklyn (Brooklyn–Queens)
3. East Bronx hospital cluster–East Harlem (Bronx–Manhattan)
4. Mid-Staten Island–Hudson County, NJ–Holland Tunnel–Manhattan (Staten Island–New Jersey–Manhattan)

== Fare and payment ==
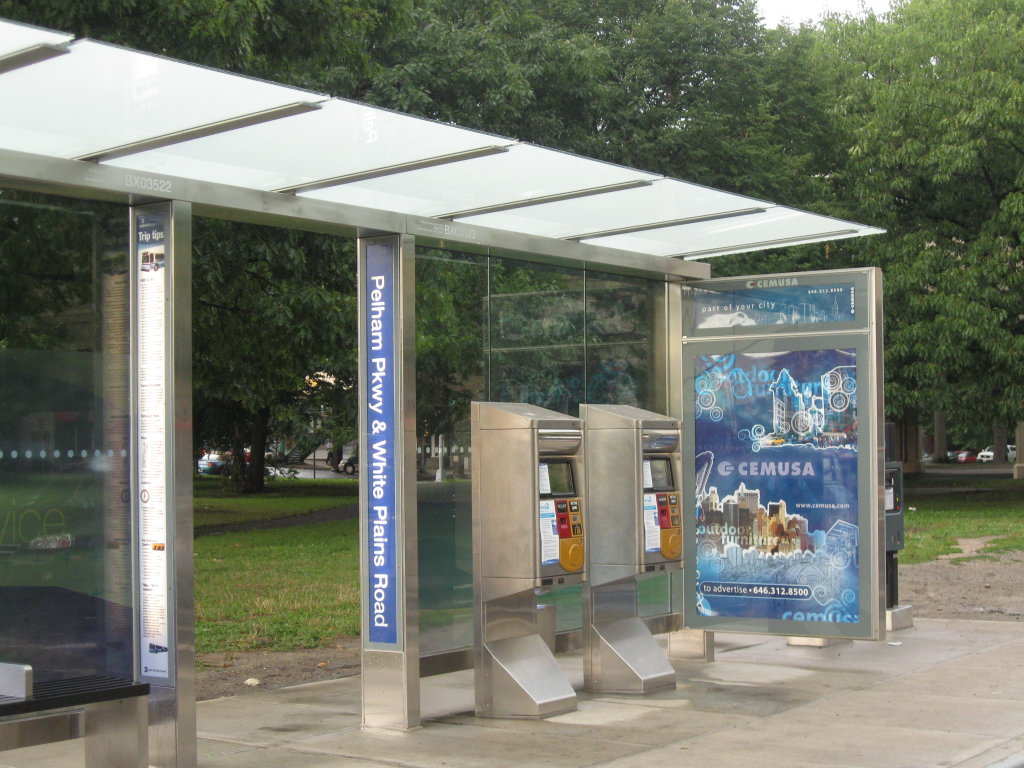
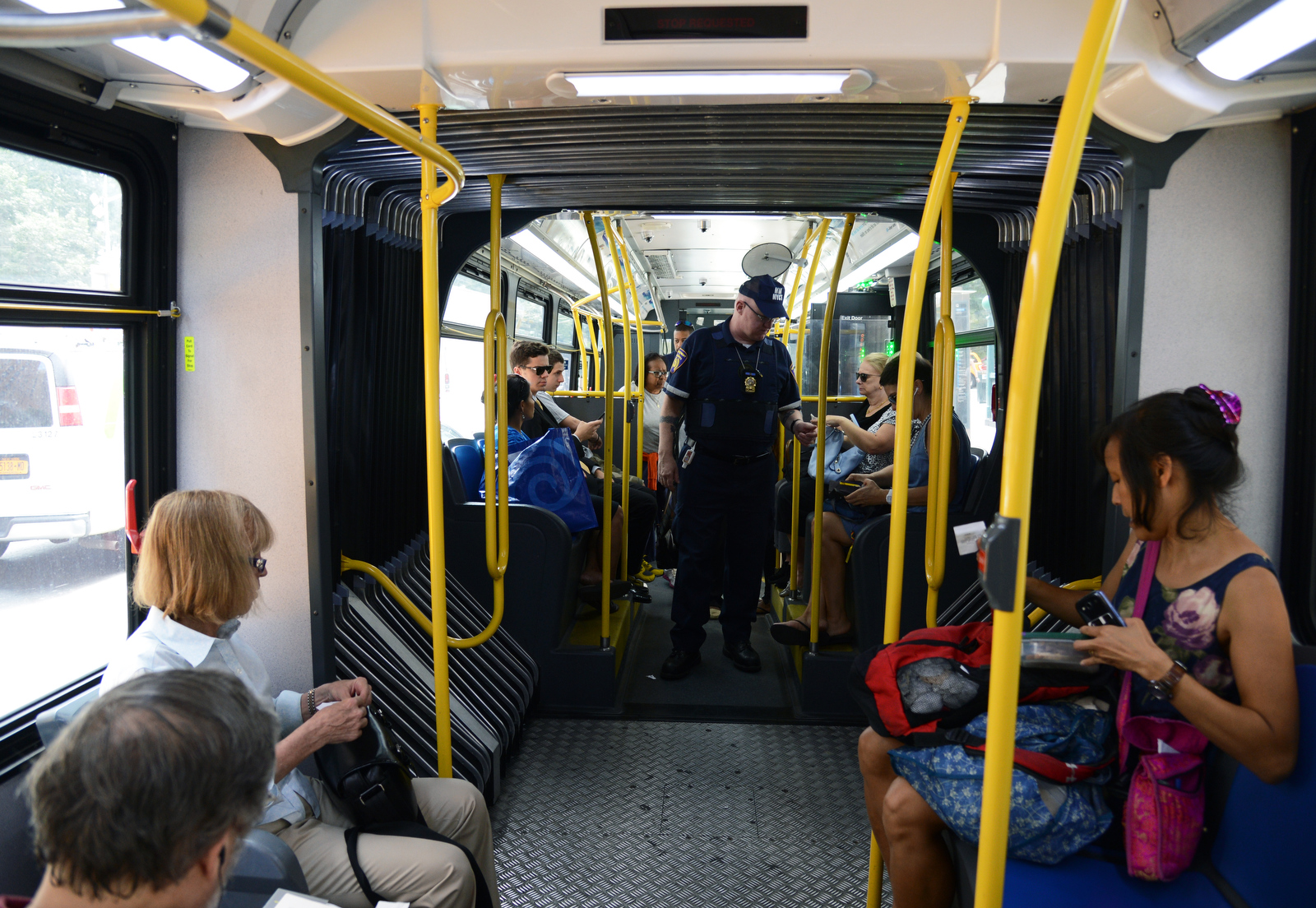
A SBS shelter (left) and fare inspection aboard a SBS bus (right).

The fare for SBS is the same as on all MTA local, rush, and limited-stop buses, which is $3.00. The fare is payable with a MetroCard or coins at booths on each stop, with the exception of the Q70, which is fare-free. The fare can also be paid on board SBS buses with MTA's OMNY fare payment system, by tapping a contactless bank card, smart device or OMNY Card at any OMNY reader at any door, excluding the S79 SBS. Unlike other bus lines in New York City, fare collection for SBS uses a proof-of-payment system.

Passengers are required to pay their fare before boarding the bus at pay stations located in bus shelters at the designated stops (for customers using UniTicket, which is valid for boarding) or paying the fare on board at any door using OMNY. Once fare payment is made, one must board the bus at that stop within one hour. Boarding can be done via any of the two or three doors (depending on the bus fleet), except on S79 buses, where all passengers board from the front door since fares are paid on board.

New York City Transit fare inspectors (organized in "EAGLE" teams), NYPD officers, or MTA police officers check for proof of payment receipts. OMNY Users will have their payment method validated with a reader carried by the "EAGLE" Team to ensure Proof of Payment. Those unable to produce one are subject to a fine of up to $100. These inspections are conducted randomly, or through the entire bus at specific stations.

Proof-of-payment receipts are only valid for the route that stops at the station at which one boards (i.e., an M34/M34A SBS receipt cannot be used on the M15 SBS). When transferring from one SBS route to another, one must obtain a second receipt from that route's fare payment machines. OMNY users must use the same payment method on their next leg of their trip to obtain their free transfer. Free transfers between routes are also provided with MetroCards.

=== Fare machines ===
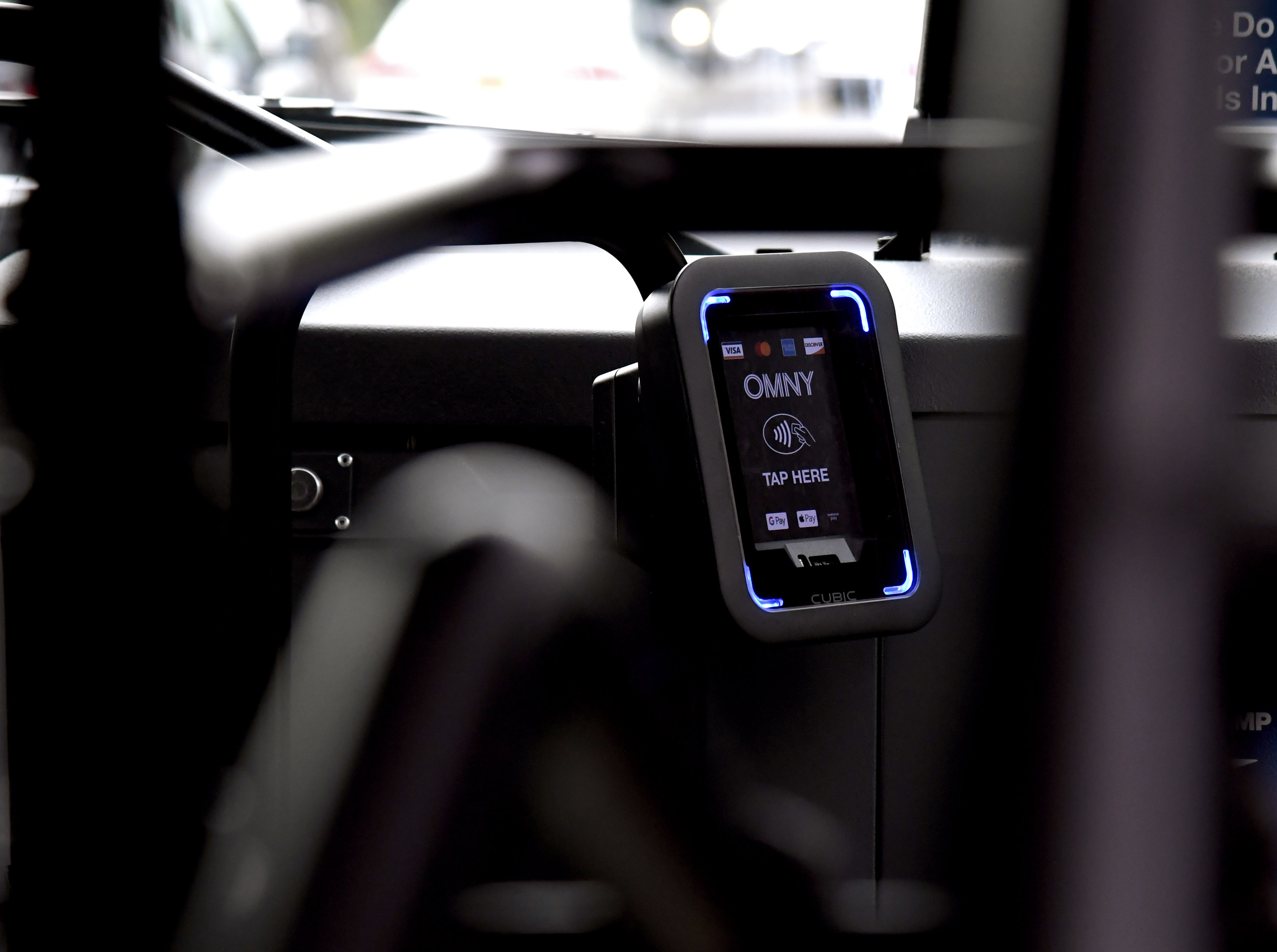
OMNY readers installed on buses

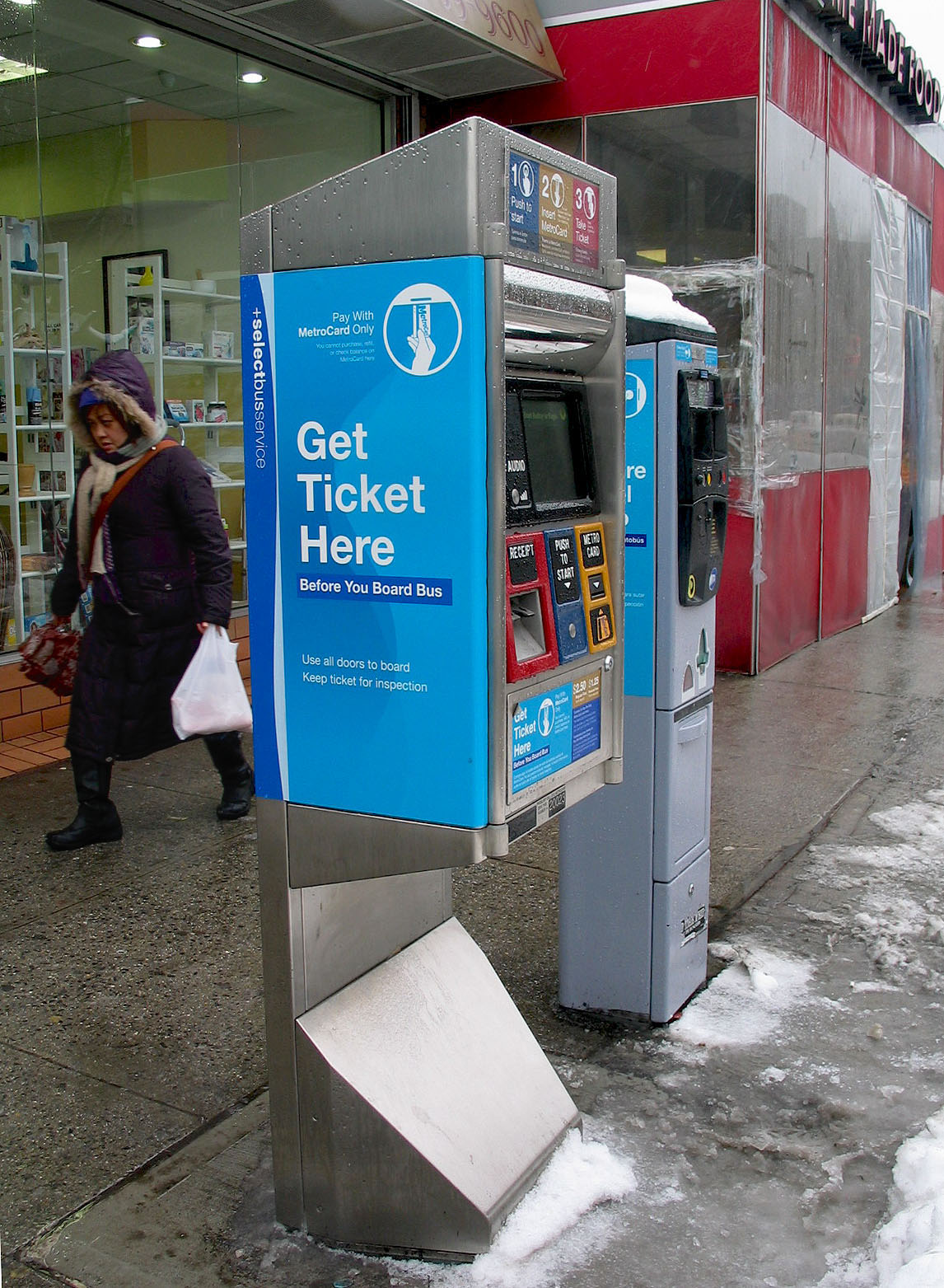
Ticketing machines used on B44 SBS route

Select Bus Service fare machines consist of modified versions of existing MTA and DOT devices. MetroCard payment utilizes MetroCard Fare Collection Machines, similar in design to ATM/Debit Card MetroCard vending machines (known as MetroCard Express Machines) used in the New York City Subway, but without touch screens. Coin payment utilizes a modified Parkeon Muni Meter. The original machines used on the Bx12 in 2008 consisted of re-purposed versions of MetroCard Express Machines and first-generation Parkeon multi-space devices, which have since been replaced.

Since 2020, Select Bus Service routes have had OMNY readers mounted on each door, where riders can tap their contactless cards, smart devices, or OMNY cards to pay the fare.

== Fleet ==
Most Select Bus Service buses are wrapped in a unique blue paint scheme that identifies them as operating in this particular service. Older buses were painted mostly white, with a blue stripe just below the windows and a teal pattern with plus signs and "+selectbusservice" logos, which have all since been unwrapped. In March 2016, a new gold-and-blue livery was introduced across the entire MTA fleet. SBS buses delivered after March 2016 have a variation of this livery, with the teal pattern below the windows and the new gold and blue livery above. As of 2019, newly delivered buses are not wrapped in the SBS livery to allow for flexible bus dispatching.

On the buses with 2016 livery, the Select Bus Service logo is located at the front and sides the bus. Q70 buses contain a unique "LaGuardia Link" livery with clouds and airplane outlines against a turquoise background on the top, as well as the words "LaGuardia Link", the route bullets for the 7, <7>, E, F, <F>, M, and R trains, and the Long Island Rail Road (LIRR) acronym. The bottom of LaGuardia Link buses contain a wave pattern in various shades of teal and blue, with plus signs and the SBS logo on the front of the bus (an older wrap was also used when the Q70 still ran 40-foot buses).

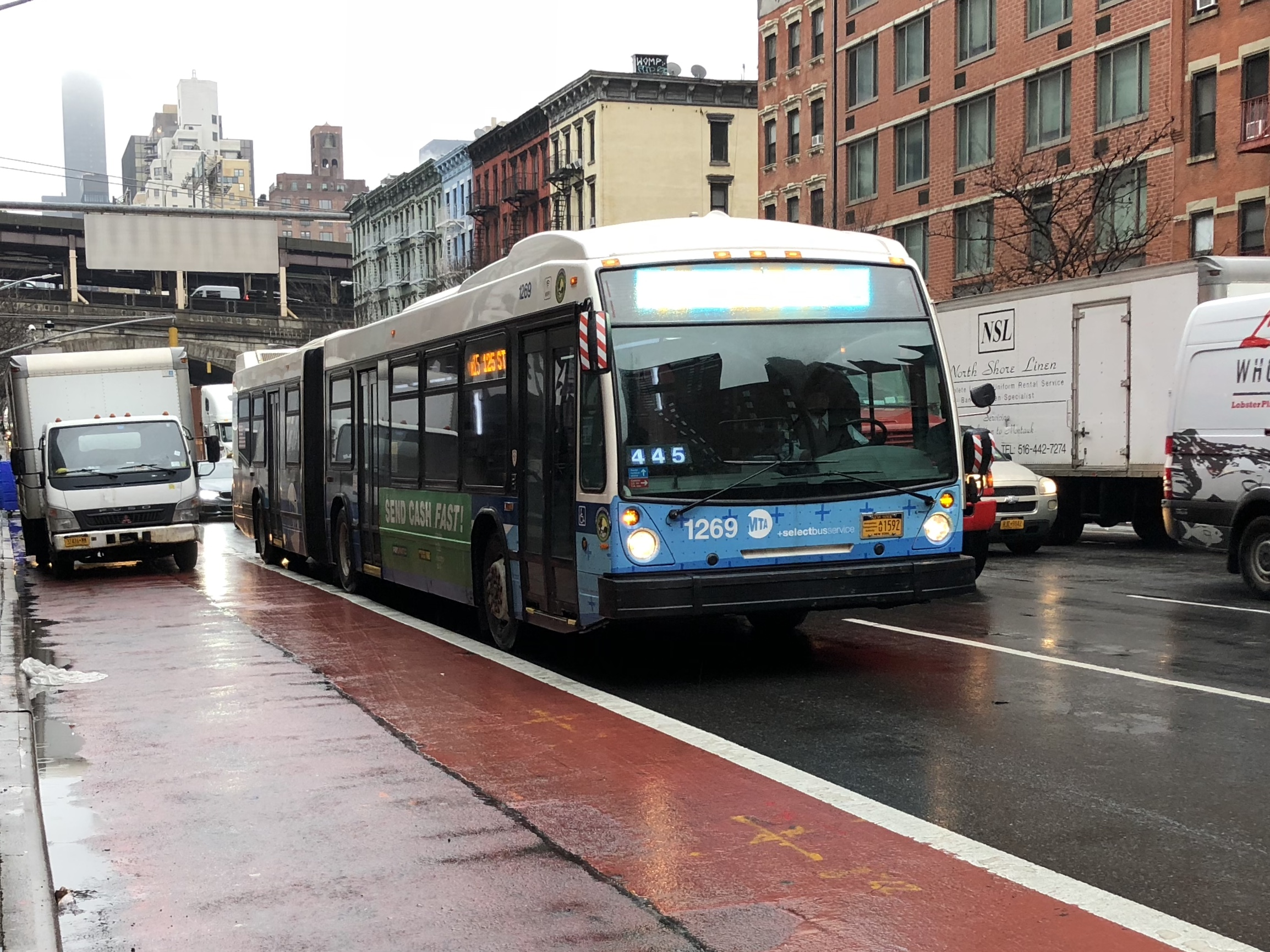
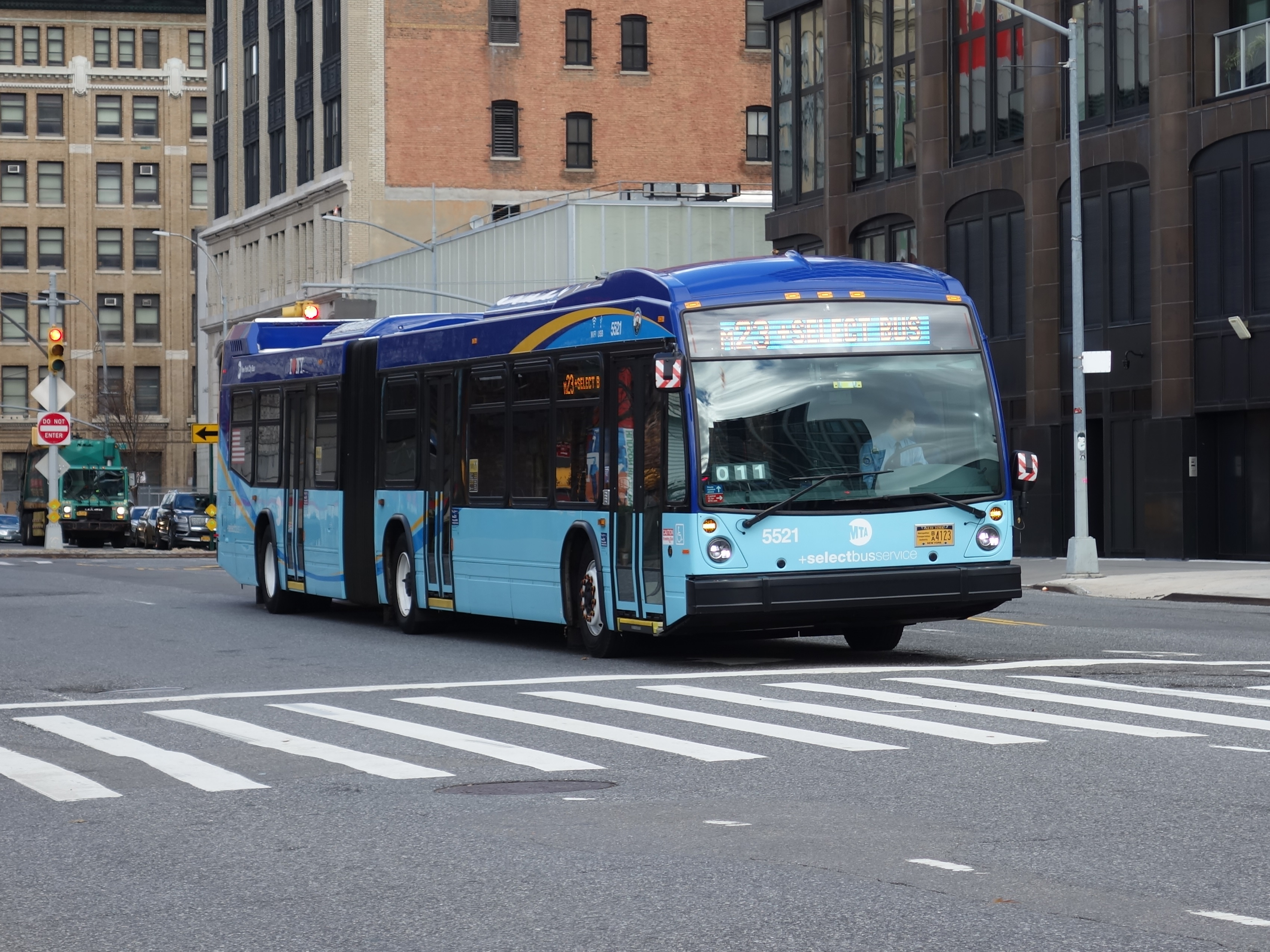
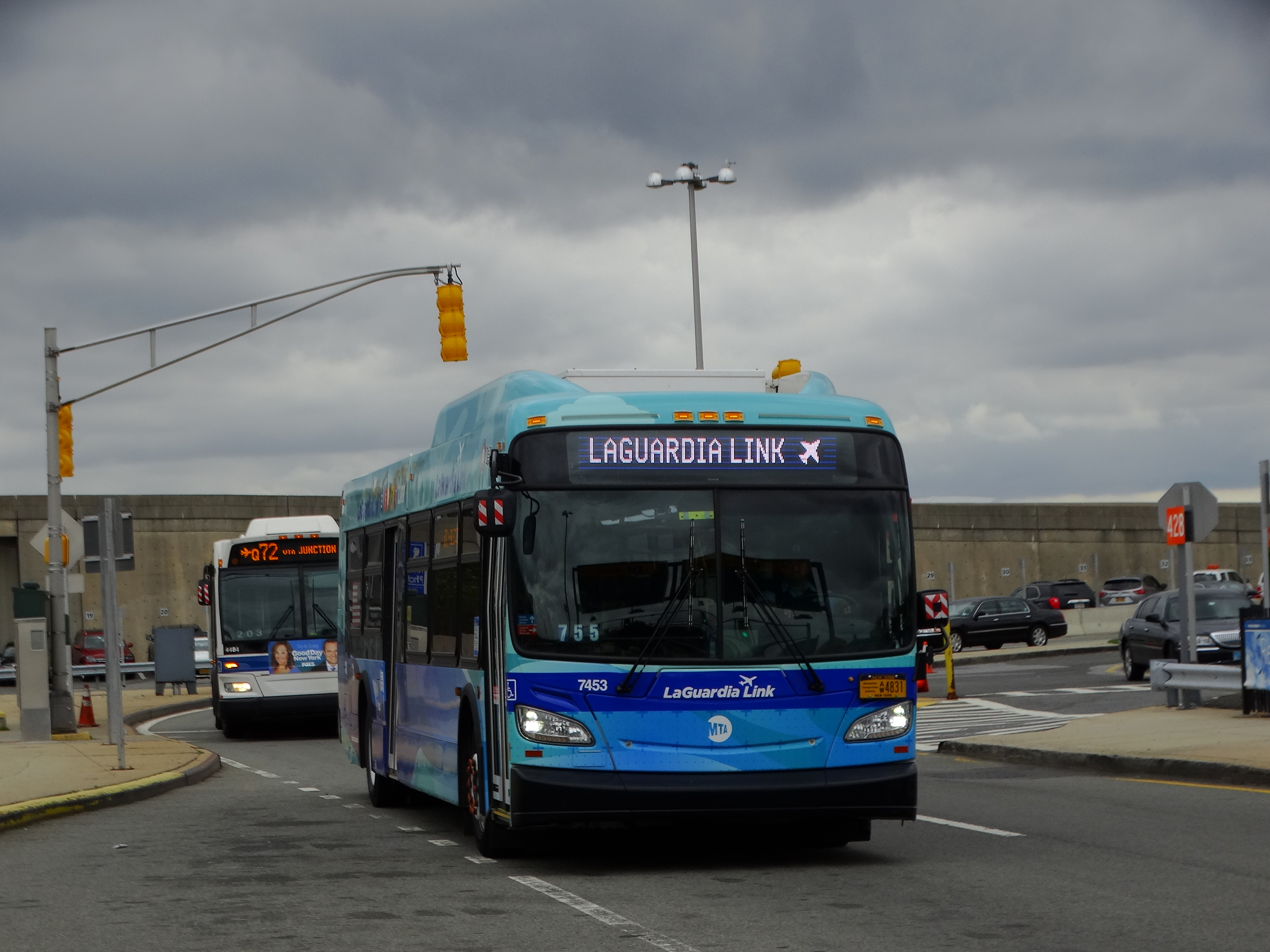
From left to right: 2008–2016 livery, post-2016 livery, and Q70 LaGuardia Link livery.
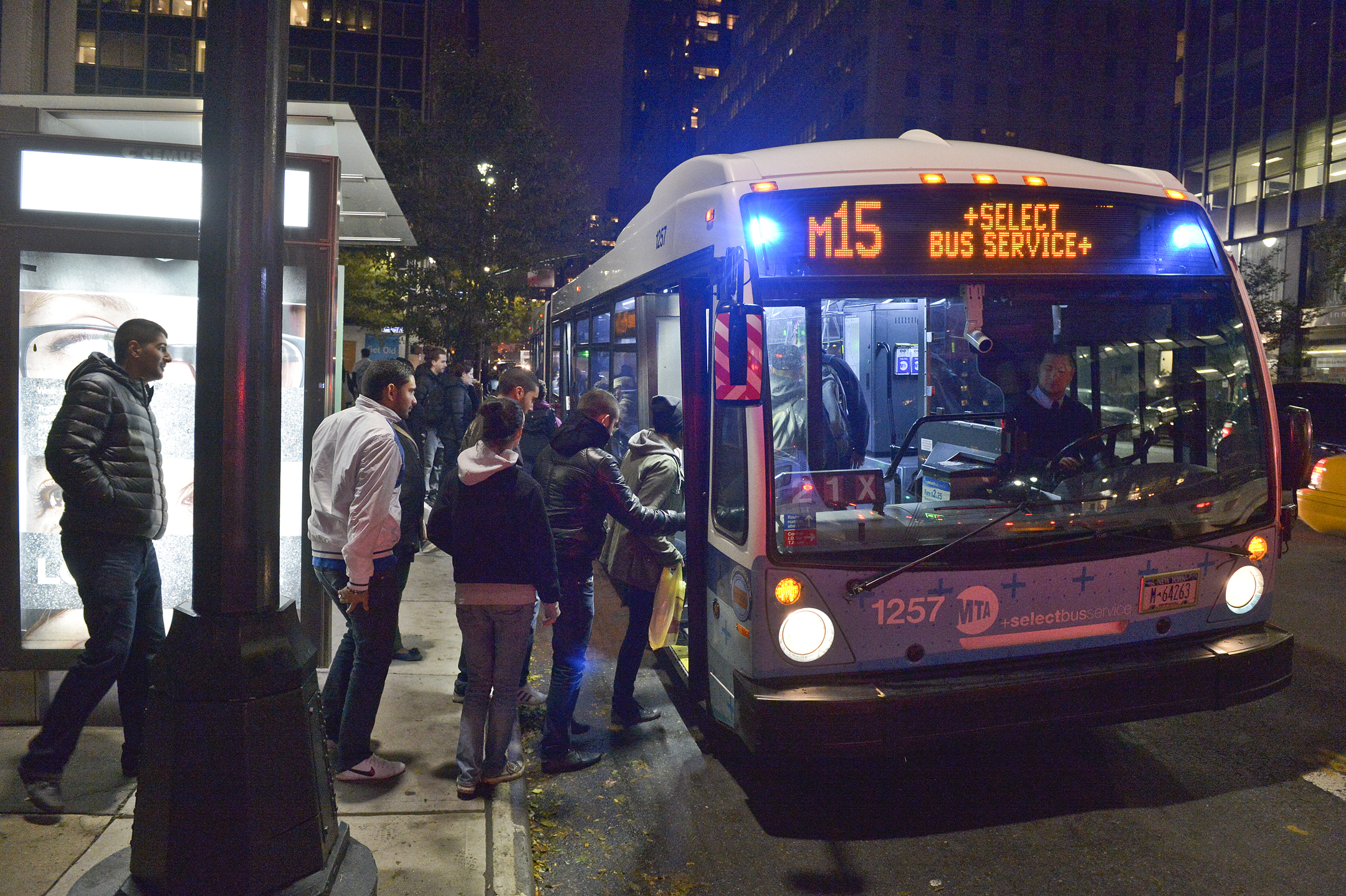
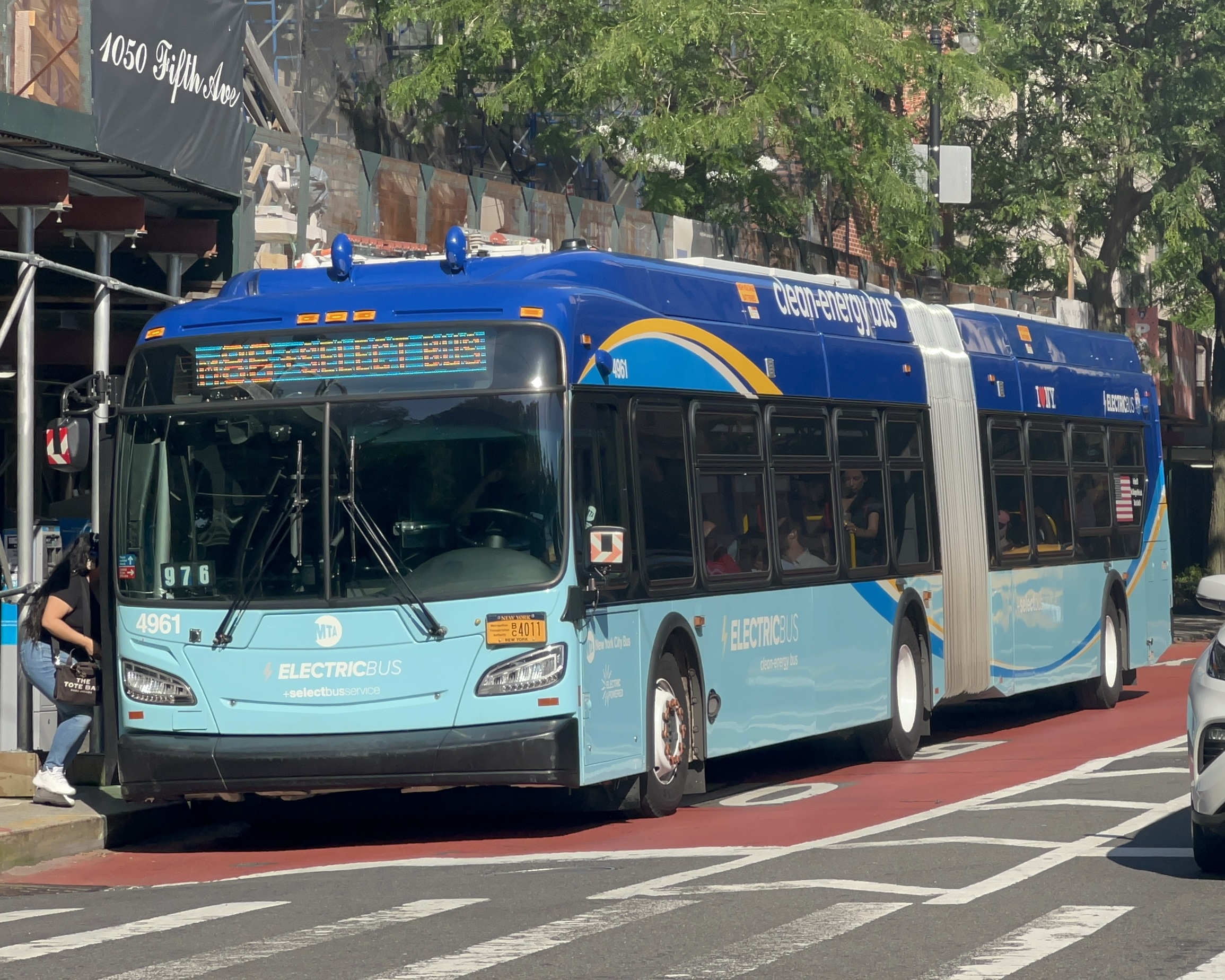
The former blue flashing lights as seen on an M15 (top), which were taken down in 2013, and the new blue destination sign as seen on an M86 (bottom) that replaced the lights.

All SBS buses display +Select Bus in the destination sign. Bus stops where SBS buses stop are also identifiable with the SBS branding on the glass shelters, and machines for MetroCard and coin payment in or near the shelters, except for the S79 SBS, which does not employ off-board fare collection. All buses on the SBS services employ all-door boarding operation, in which each set of doors open simultaneously for easier boarding and alighting, with the exception of the S79 which does not employ all-door boarding.

Upon the debut of Select Bus Service on the Bx12, all buses were high-floored; they was replaced by low-floor buses in 2010 when the M15 began SBS service.

Until 2013, in addition to the wrap, blue flashing lights on both sides of the destination sign were also used to help designate SBS buses from local buses, which had orange lights until 2011. While some, including bus operators, claimed the flashing blue lights helped improve travel times for buses, they were controversial due to some drivers mistaking them for emergency vehicles. The use of the lights also violated the New York State Vehicle and Traffic Law (Article 9, Section 375 (41)). NYS Law states "The use of blue lights on vehicles shall be restricted for use only by a volunteer firefighter" and "may be affixed to a police vehicle and fire vehicle, provided that such blue light or lights shall be displayed on a police vehicle and fire vehicle for rear projection only." The lights were removed from service in January 2013.

To replace the lights, in July 2015 the MTA began overhauling the front destination signs of buses to display the route in a blue background, as well as a completely blue background that flashes twice when it says +Select Bus (four times on some Q52/53 buses). At night on some routes, the front destination sign is blue text on an unlit black background. Starting with the Q44 in November 2015, the blue background is kept when the front signage transitions to show the terminal of the route and the main streets traveled. As of July 2017, the SBS fleet on all routes have had their front destination signs overhauled, and new routes that launched after December 2015 came with the new destination signs. Non-overhauled buses were also updated to say +Select Bus instead of +Select Bus Service, and the flash was also included on buses with the older Hanover signage.

In December 2019, the MTA unveiled its first 15 fully electric articulated buses, the XE60 fleet by New Flyer Industries, which now operate on various Michael J. Quill Depot SBS routes. As of December 2022, all SBS routes use articulated buses except the B82 and S79.

== See also ==
- MTA Regional Bus Operations
- Bus rapid transit
