= Yorkville, Manhattan =

Yorkville
- Neighborhood
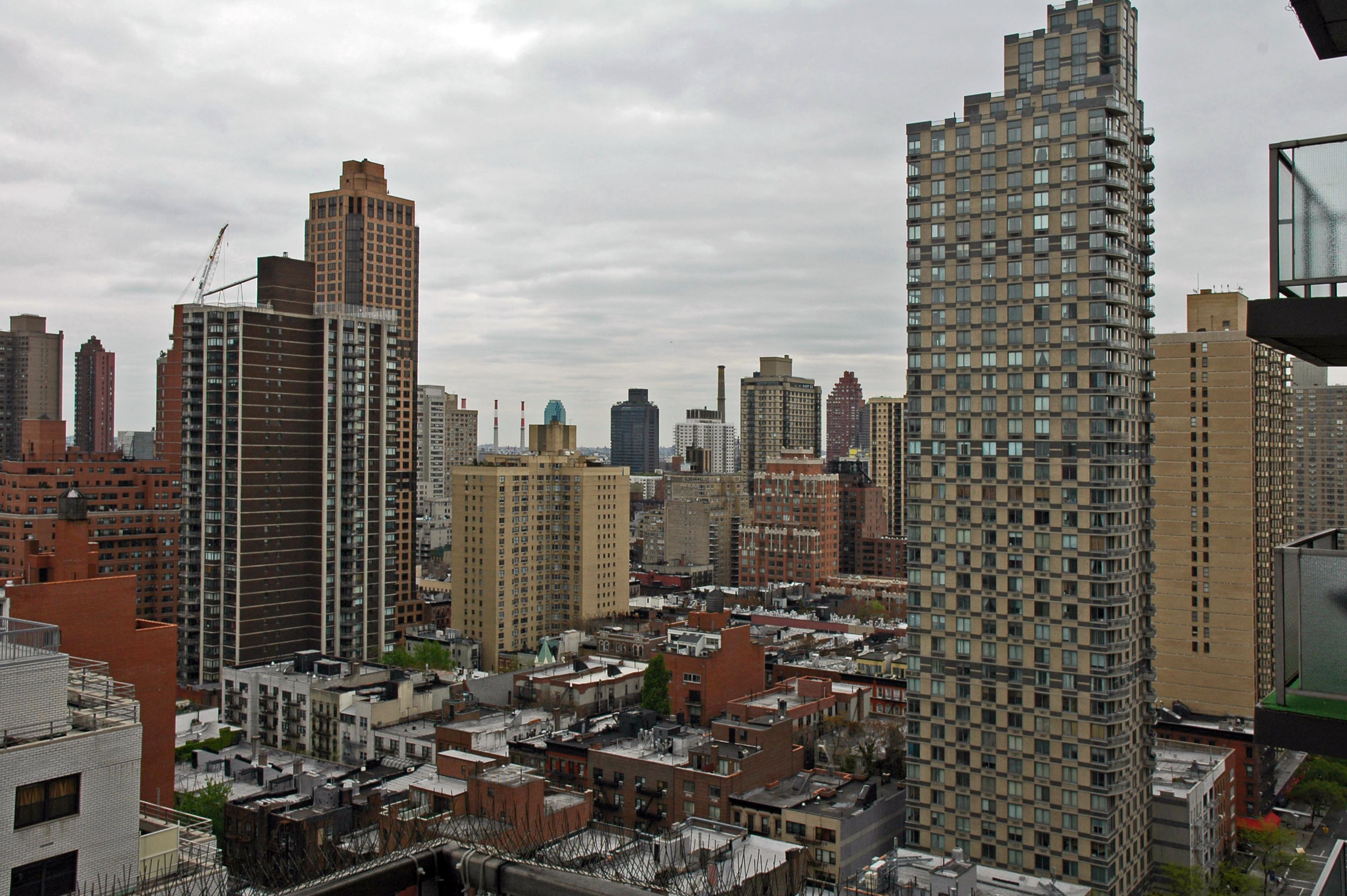
- Yorkville, as seen from a highrise on East 87th Street
- Location in New York City
- Coordinates: 40.776°N 73.950°W
- Country: United States
- State: New York
- City: New York City
- Borough: Manhattan
- Community District: Manhattan 8

Area
  - Total: 0.492 sq mi (1.27 km^{2})

Population (2020)
  - Total: 84,046
  - Density: 171,000/sq mi (66,000/km^{2})

Ethnicity

Economics
  - Median income: $103,234
- Time zone: UTC−5 (Eastern)
  - Summer (DST): UTC−4 (EDT)
- ZIP Codes: 10028, 10075, 10128
- Area codes: 212, 332, 646, and 917

Yorkville is a neighborhood on the Upper East Side of Manhattan, New York City, United States. Its southern boundary is East 79th Street, its northern East 96th Street, its western Third Avenue, and its eastern the East River. Yorkville is one of the most densely populated city subdivisions in the world, and the most dense of such in North America.

Yorkville is part of Manhattan Community District 8, and its primary ZIP Codes are 10028, 10075, and 10128. It is patrolled by the 19th Precinct of the New York City Police Department.

== History ==
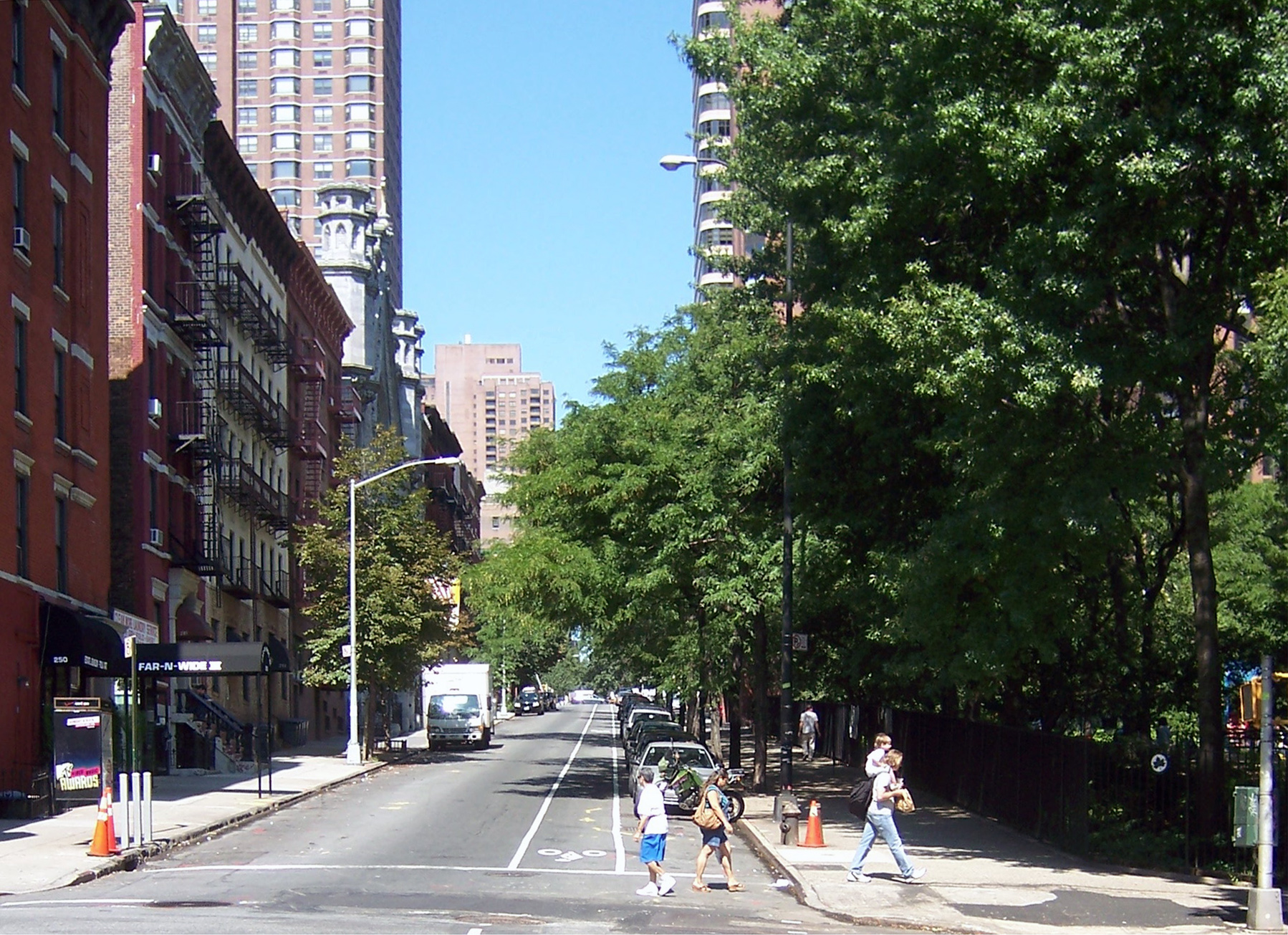
Looking west at 90th Street and Second Avenue

=== Early history ===
Pre-colonization, Yorkville was an undeveloped area of forests and streams. In August 1776, George Washington stationed half of his Continental Army in Manhattan and the other half in Brooklyn. Many troops in the Yorkville area on Manhattan's Upper East Side were in defensive positions along the East River to protect a possible retreat off Long Island, and to inflict damage on invading land and sea British forces. Following their August 27 defeat in the Battle of Long Island, the Continentals implemented an orderly pivoting retreat in the Yorkville area, leading the enemy to entice the Continentals to fight by piping "Fly Away", about a fox running away from hounds. The Continentals' disciplined northerly retreat led to the successful Battle of Harlem Heights in September 1776.

In 1815, the Upper East Side was a farmland and market garden district. The Boston Post Road traversed the Upper East Side, locally called the Eastern Post Road; milepost 6 was near the northeast corner of Third Avenue and 81st Street. From 1833 to 1837 the New York and Harlem Railroad, one of the earliest railway systems in the United States, was extended through the Upper East Side along Fourth Avenue (later renamed Park Avenue). A hamlet grew near the 86th Street station, becoming the Yorkville neighborhood as gradual yet steady commercial development occurred. The current street grid was laid-out between 1839 and 1844 as part of the Commissioners' Plan of 1811, so the Eastern Post Road was abandoned. The community had been referred to as Yorkville before 1867.

By 1850, a significant proportion of the inhabitants of the area were the Germans and Irish that helped build the Croton Aqueduct. The area was included in the 19th administrative district, whose boundaries were 40th and 86th Street. In 1858, horsecars began running on Second and Third Avenues. After the American Civil War, mansions replaced slums in Yorkville. On December 30, 1878, the IRT Third Avenue Line opened, followed by the IRT Second Avenue Line in August 1879.

=== Ethnic settlement ===
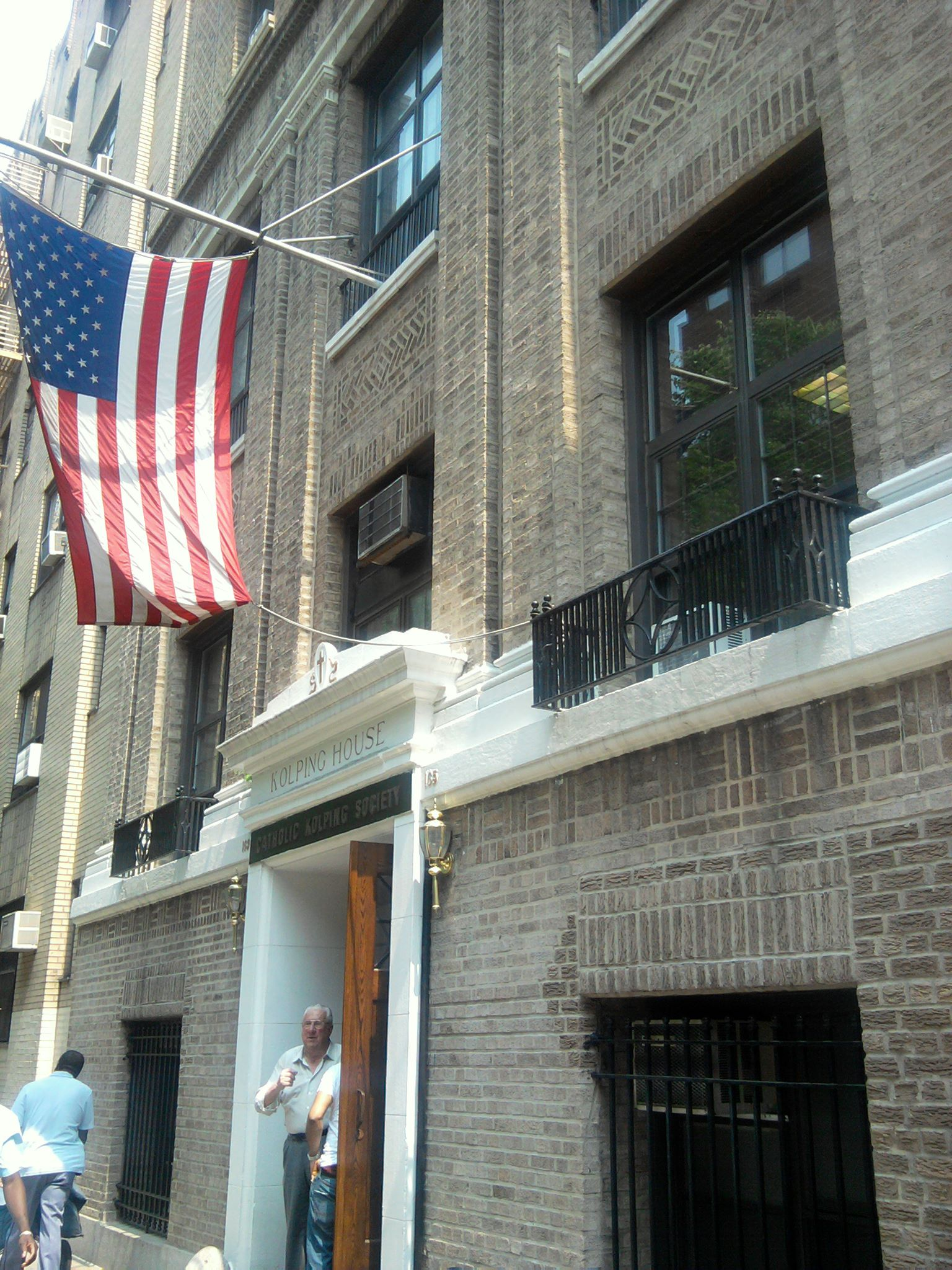
Kolping House, 88th Street

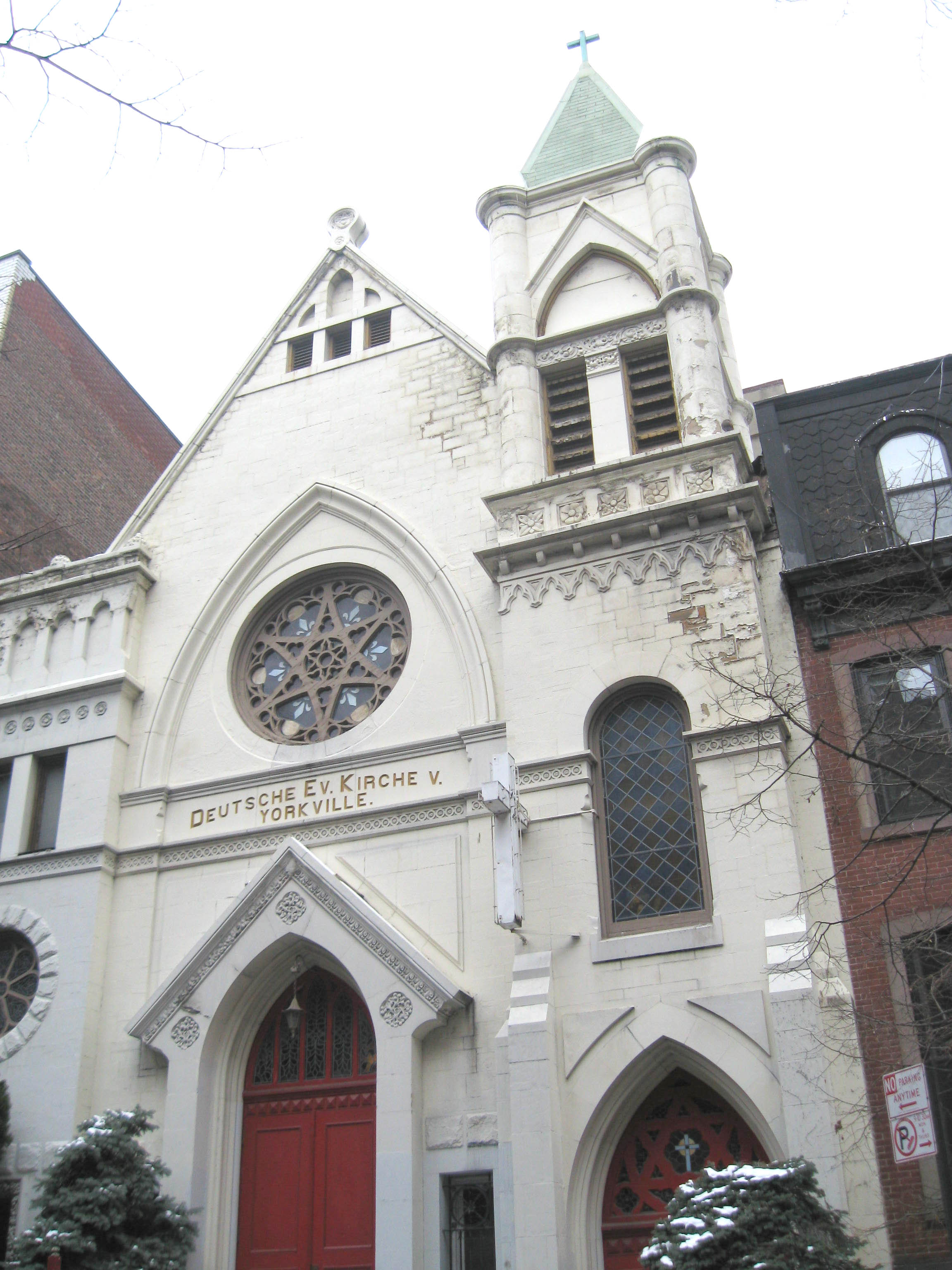
Zion-St. Mark's Evangelical Lutheran Church

For much of the 19th and into the 20th centuries, Yorkville was a mostly German enclave of middle- to working-class families. Over time, many people of Czech, Slovak, Irish, French Canadian, Polish, Hungarian, and Lebanese descent moved in. The neighborhood became more affluent.

From 1880, Yorkville became a destination for German-born immigrants. However, by the 1900s, many German residents moved to Yorkville and other neighborhoods from "Kleindeutschland" (Little Germany) on the Lower East Side after the General Slocum disaster on June 15, 1904. The ship caught fire in the East River just off the shores of Yorkville, leading family members to move closer to the site of the incident. Most of the passengers on the ship were German. In addition, the general trend towards moving to the suburbs reduced the German population in Manhattan; by 1930, most German New Yorkers lived in Queens.

On 86th Street, in the central portion of Yorkville, there were many German shops, restaurants and bakeries. Yorkville became the melting pot of populations arriving from various regions of the Prussian-dominated German Empire and its colonies, where many cultures spoke German. In the 1930s, the neighborhood was the home base of Fritz Julius Kuhn's German American Bund, the most notorious pro-Nazi group in 1930s United States, which led to spontaneous protests by other residents. Yorkville was a haven for refugees from Nazi Germany in the 1940s, and from refugees from communist regimes in the 1950s and 1960s. The neighborhood is the site of the annual Steuben Parade, a large German-American celebration.

The largest non-German group were the Irish, who mostly lived in an area bounded by 81st and 85th Streets, and Lexington and Fifth Avenues. They attended mass at such churches as St. Ignatius Loyola on 84th Street and Park Avenue, Our Lady of Good Counsel (90th Street) and the Church of St. Joseph (87th Street). There were many Irish bars including Dorrian's Red Hand Restaurant. Until the late 1990s, New York's St. Patrick's Day Parade ended at 86th Street and Third Avenue, the historical center of Yorkville. In addition, Jews also lived on Second Avenue.

79th Street was a hub for the Austro-Hungarian populace. Popular restaurants included the Viennese Lantern, Tokay, Hungarian Gardens, Robert Heller's Cafe Abbazia at 2nd Avenue, Budapest and the Debrecen. There were also a number of butcher stores and businesses that imported goods from Hungary. Churches included St. Stephen Catholic Church and the Hungarian Reformed Church on East 82nd Street. In addition, Czechs, Poles and Slovaks lived from 65th to 73rd Street. Besides Ruc, a Czech restaurant off Second Avenue, Praha on Second Avenue, and Varsata on East 75th, there were sokol halls on 67th and 71st Streets. There were other Czech and Slovak businesses, such as Czech butcher shops, poultry and grocery stores, and shops that sold imported goods such as Bohemian books, leather products and crystal.

=== Recent history ===
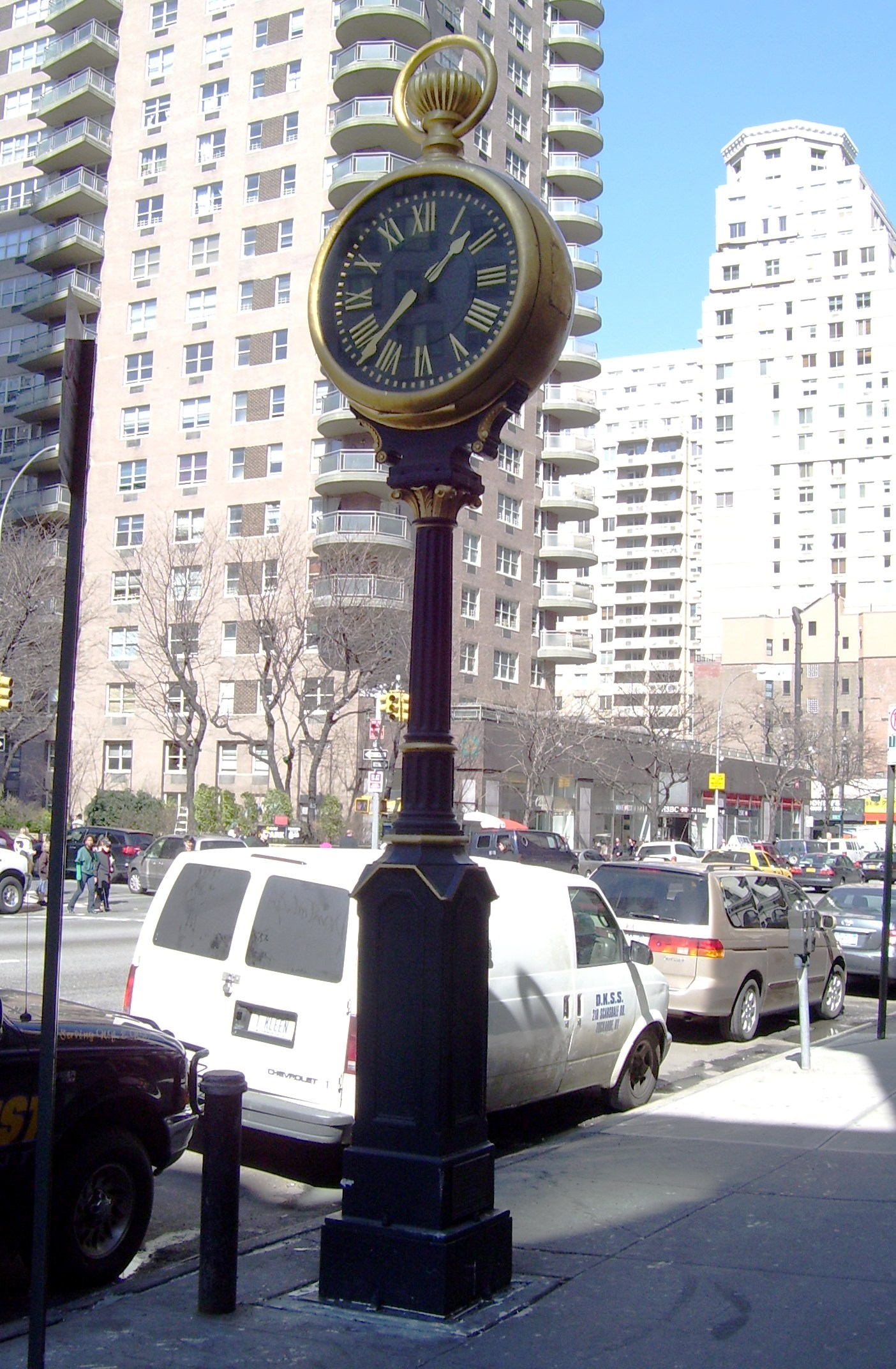
A sidewalk clock on 1501 Third Avenue

Around the late 1920s, Yorkville's ethnic diversity was beginning to wane. In 1926, the New York Times wrote of Yorkville's changing ethnic makeup:

Yorkville, for well-nigh two decades known to connoisseurs of east side life as the exclusive domain of Czechoslovaks, Hungarians and Germans, is slowly giving up its strongly accentuated Central European character and gradually merging into a state of colorless impersonality...

In 1928, a one-block section of Sutton Place north of 59th Street, and all of Avenue A north of that point, was renamed York Avenue to honor U.S. Army Sergeant Alvin York, who received the Medal of Honor for attacking a German machine gun nest during World War I's Meuse-Argonne Offensive.

In March 1936, the German American Bund established its headquarters on East 85th Street in Yorkville. This pro-Nazi anti-Semitic organization organized parades, rallies and summer camps for children and families and worked to keep America out of the war, to the benefit of Germany. Their 1939 rally in Madison Square Garden drew more than 10,000 Nazis and sympathizers. They were forced to disband after Germany declared war on the United States in December 1941.

The dismantling of the Third Avenue El in 1955 led to the demolition of many mansions. This led to the acceleration of the exodus of Yorkville residents. Over the years, this trend continued. Thus, in the 1980s, a building for members of the German gymnastic society Turners, at the intersection of 86th Street and Lexington Avenue, was demolished. Cafe Mozart, on 86th Street between Second and Third Avenues, was also demolished. In their place were built high-rise residential complexes.

By the turn of the 21st century, East 82nd Street was co-named St. Stephen of Hungary Way. The area from East 79th to 83rd Streets, spanning approximately four blocks east-west, is colloquially known as Little Hungary.

== Demographics ==
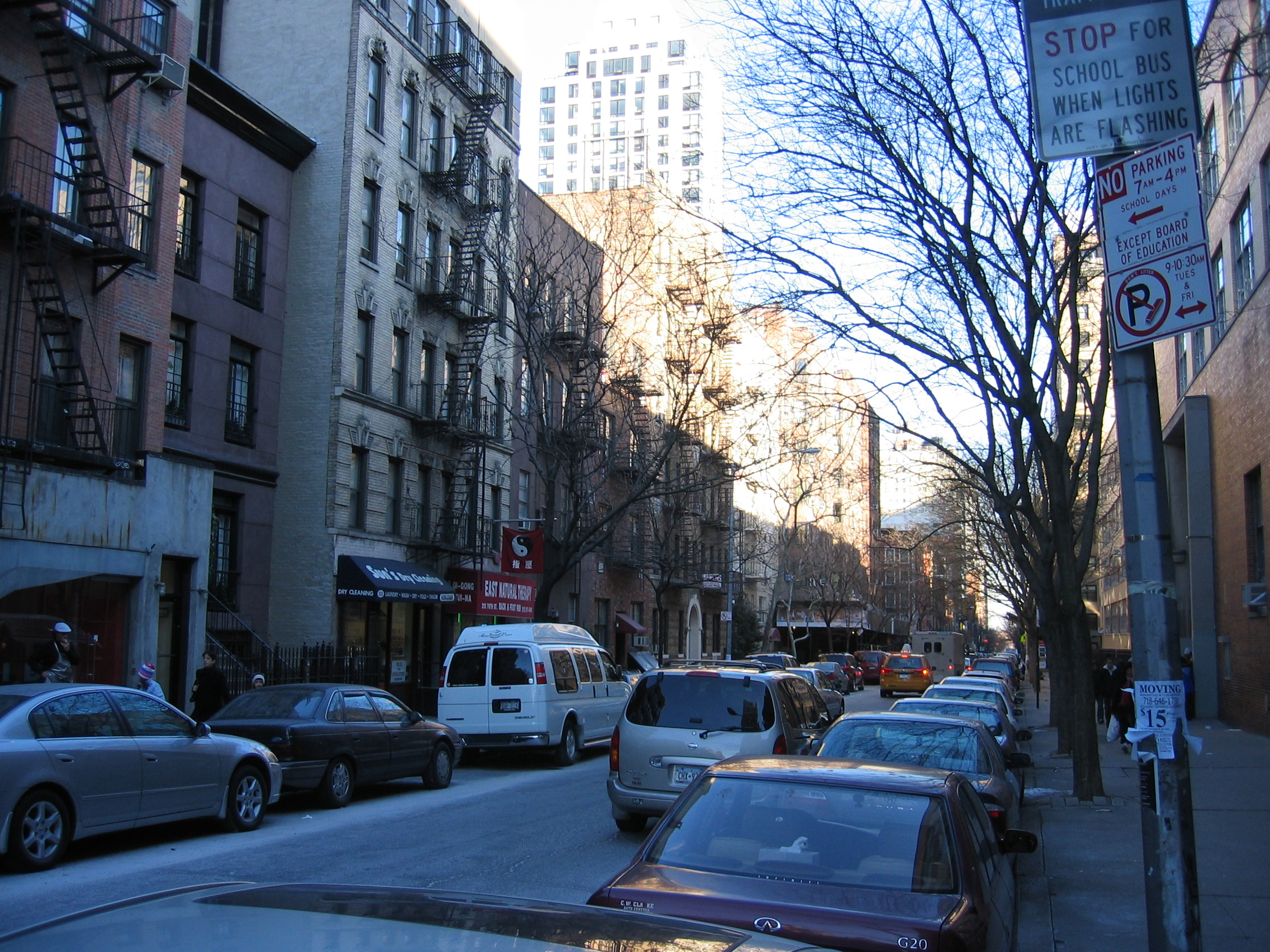
76th Street between Second and Third Avenues

Based on data from the 2020 United States Census, the population of Yorkville was 84,046, an increase of 6,104 (7.8%) from the 77,942 counted in 2010. Covering an area of 319.14 acres (129.15 ha), the neighborhood had a population density of 263.35 inhabitants per acre (168,540/sq mi).

The racial makeup of the neighborhood was 70.9% (59,630) white, 3.5% (2,968) African American, 11.2% (9,425) Asian, 0.7% (572) from other races, and 3.9% (3,252) from two or more races. Hispanic or Latino of any race were 9.8% (8,199) of the population.

The racial composition of Yorkville changed moderately from 2000 to 2010. The most significant changes were the increase in the Asian population by 41% (2,117), the increase in the Hispanic / Latino population by 18% (1,024), and the decrease in the white population by 4% (2,201). The Black population increased by 2% (64) and remained small, as did the population of all other races, which increased by 11% (170).

The median income for a household in Yorkville is almost twice the average for the city, at $85,724.

== Police and crime ==
Yorkville is patrolled by the 19th Precinct of the NYPD, located at 153 East 67th Street. The 19th Precinct ranked 14th safest out of 69 patrol areas for per-capita crime in 2010. The 19th Precinct has a lower crime rate than in the 1990s, with crimes across all categories having decreased by 82.2% between 1990 and 2022. The precinct reported two murders, 12 rapes, 229 robberies, 173 felony assaults, 278 burglaries, 1,724 grand larcenies, and 192 grand larcenies auto in 2022.

== Fire safety ==
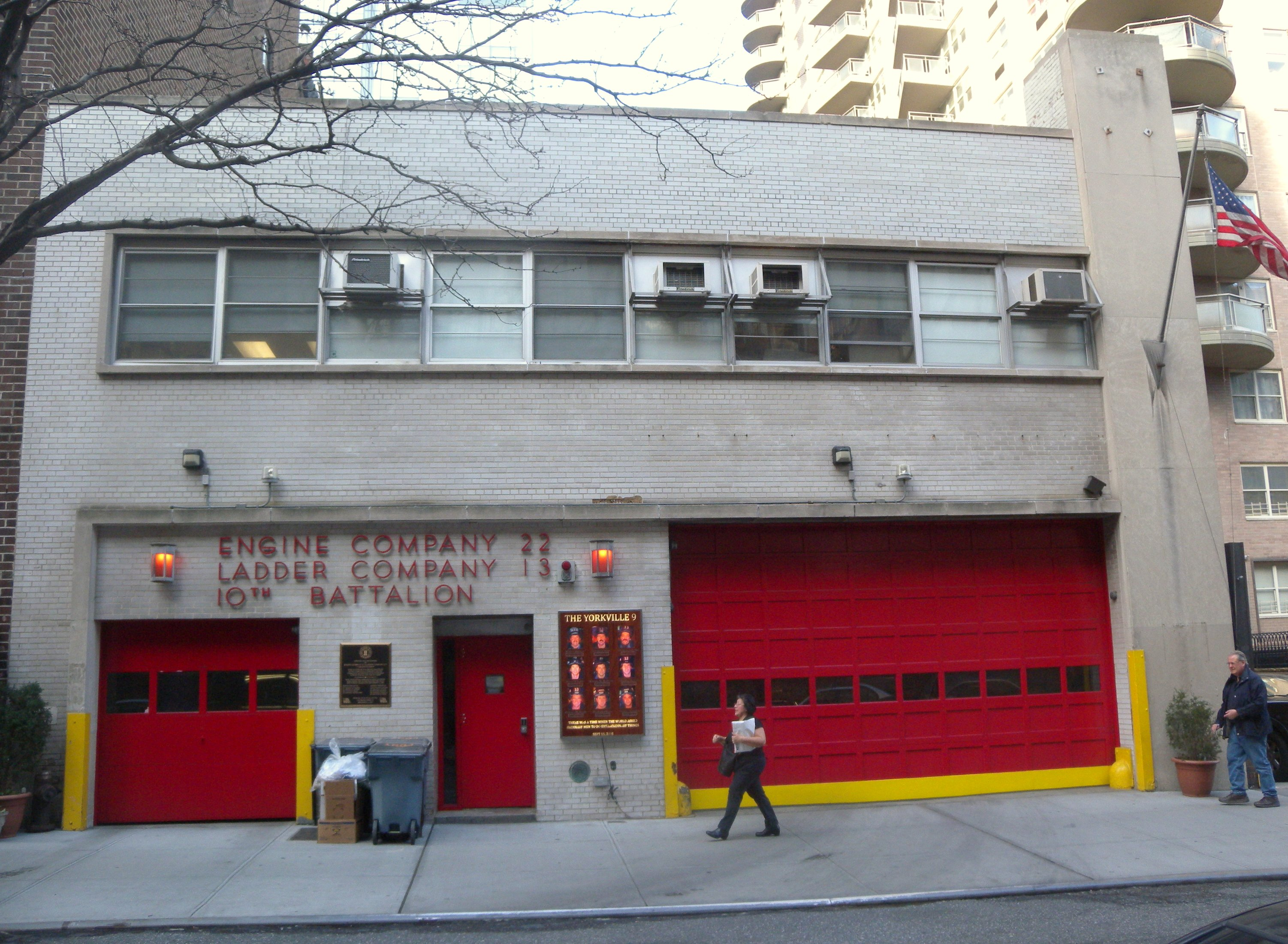
Quarters of New York City Fire Department Engine Company 22/Ladder Company 13/Battalion 10

Yorkville is served by two New York City Fire Department (FDNY) fire stations:

- Engine Company 44 – 221 East 75th Street
- Engine Company 22/Ladder Company 13/Battalion 10 – 159 East 85th Street

== Post offices and ZIP Codes ==
Yorkville is located in three primary ZIP Codes. From south to north, they are 10075 (between 76th and 80th Streets), 10028 (between 80th and 86th Streets), and 10128 (north of 86th Street). In addition, 500 East 77th Street in Yorkville has its own ZIP Code, 10162. The United States Postal Service operates three post offices in Yorkville:

- Cherokee Station – 1483 York Avenue
- Gracie Station – 229 East 85th Street
- Yorkville Station – 1617 Third Avenue

== Education ==
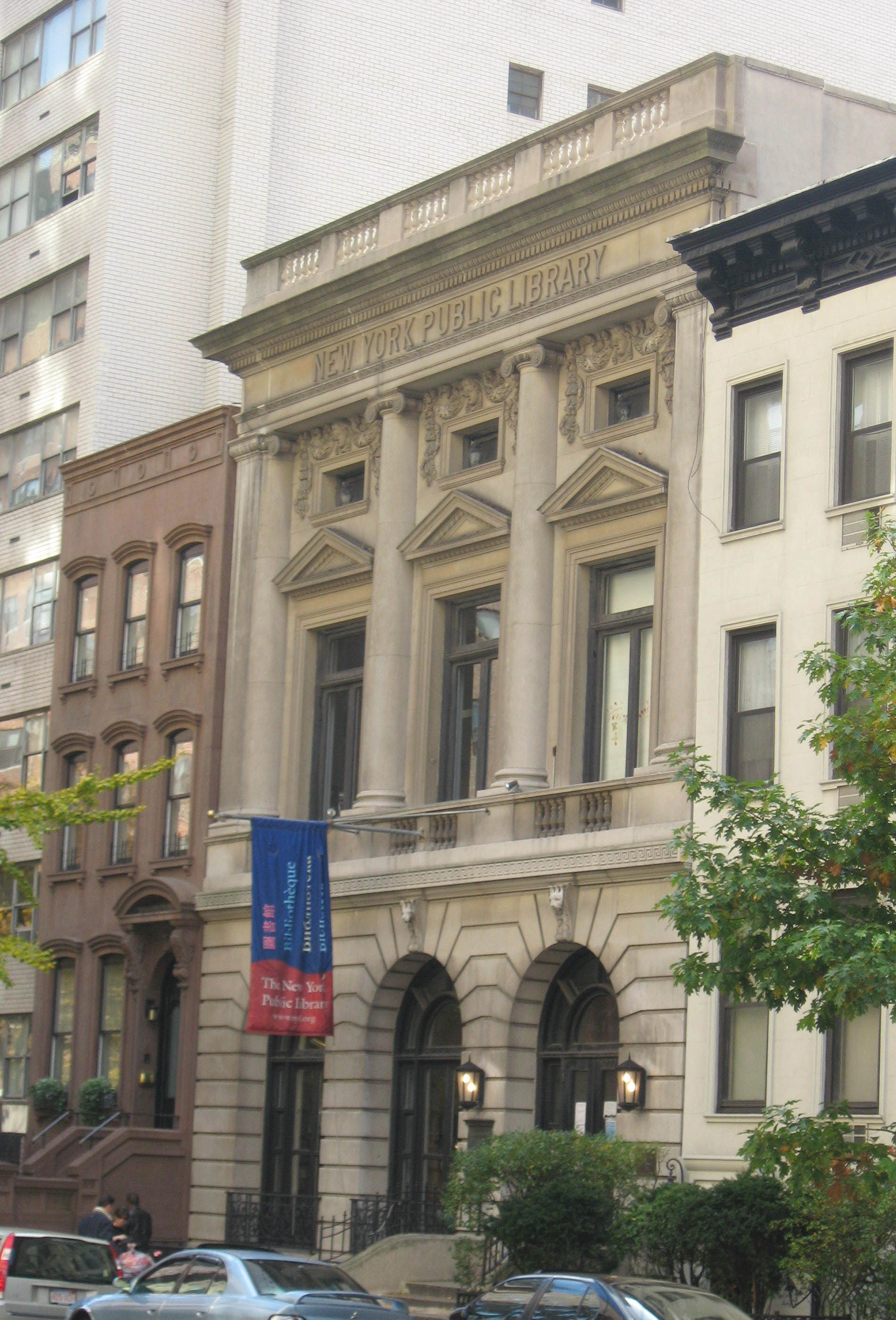
New York Public Library, Yorkville branch

=== Schools and higher education ===
The New York City Department of Education operates several public schools in the area.

The City University of New York has its administrative offices in Yorkville. In addition Fordham Graduate Housing is located on East 81st Street between York and East End Avenues.

The Lycée Français de New York is located on East 75th Street between York and East End Avenues. Further north, East Side Middle School is located on 91st Street between First and Second Avenues. The Trevor Day School is located four blocks north, on 95th Street between First and Second Avenues.

=== Libraries ===
The New York Public Library (NYPL) operates two branches near Yorkville. The Yorkville branch is located at 222 East 79th Street. The branch, a Carnegie library, opened in 1902 and was renovated in 1986–1987. The three-story space is listed on the New York State Register of Historic Places and the National Register of Historic Places. The Webster branch is located at 1465 York Avenue. The branch was founded in 1893 as the Webster Free Library, and the current Carnegie library structure opened in 1906.

== Transportation ==
The New York City Subway's 86th Street and 96th Street stations, served by the Second Avenue Subway (Q train), serve much of Yorkville. Meanwhile, Western Yorkville is served by 77th Street, 86th Street and 96th Street stations on the IRT Lexington Avenue Line (6 and <6> trains), one block west of Yorkville's western boundary at 3rd Avenue. The bus routes M15, M15 SBS, M31, M72, M79 SBS, M86 SBS, M96, M98, M101, M102, M103 of the New York City Bus also operate in Yorkville.

Eastern Yorkville had historically been far from any subway connections, and had among the farthest walks in Manhattan to any subway stations. From 2007 to 2017, the Metropolitan Transportation Authority built the Second Avenue Subway's 86th Street and 96th Street stations, leading to increased residential construction and real estate prices in advance of the opening of the new subway line.

Yorkville is served by NYC Ferry's Soundview and Astoria routes, which stop at 90th Street. The service started operating on August 15, 2018.

== Prominent locations ==
- Carl Schurz Park is a park on the far east side of Yorkville, adjacent to the East River.
- Gracie Mansion is the official home of the mayor of New York City.
- The Henderson Place Historic District, a New York City landmark on the National Register of Historic Places, is located on East End Avenue between 86th and 87th Streets.
- The Manhattan Chamber of Commerce was founded in Yorkville c. 1920, founded by 11 local businessmen.
- The Municipal Asphalt Plant was constructed in 1941. Asphalt Green, a fitness center, opened in the building in 1984.
- The 91st Street Marine Transfer Station is a controversial waste transfer plant next to Asphalt Green, on York Avenue. The waste facility was supported by New York City mayors Bill de Blasio and Michael Bloomberg. The waste facility has been criticized by some area residents.
- On 86th Street and 3rd Avenue, the first Papaya King opened in 1932 and closed in 2023.
- 225 East 86th Street is a condominium in the area.
- Ruppert Yorkville Towers were built as an urban renewal project on the site of the old Jacob Ruppert Brewing Co., which closed in the 1960s. It is a two-building complex stretching from 90th to 92nd Streets, between Second and Third Avenue.

== Notable residents ==
Residents of Yorkville have included:

- Bob Cousy (born 1928), professional basketball player
- James Cagney (1899–1986), actor, grew up in the neighborhood
- The Culkin family, several of whom are prominent actors, including Macaulay, Kieran, and Rory. The family lived in a small apartment on East 94th St. and attended Mass at the nearby St. Joseph Church during the 1980s
- Julia Fox (born 1990), artist, model, and actress, moved to Yorkville to live with her father at age 6
- Jay Henry (born 1996), musician of New York dance project Headfooter, grew up on 85th St. and East End Ave.
- Lou Gehrig (1903–1941), Major League Baseball player, was born at 309 East 94th Street
- August 'Gus' Gennerich (1887–1936), bodyguard to Franklin D. Roosevelt
- Ignatz Theodor Griebl (born 1899 - Unknown.), German-American physician and a recruiter for the German spy network in New York City
- Norma Kamali (born 1945), fashion designer, grew up and went to school in Yorkville
- Helmut Krone (1925–1996), art director who was considered to be a pioneer of modern advertising
- Bert Lahr (1895–1967), actor best known for playing the role of the Cowardly Lion in the 1939 film The Wizard of Oz
- Janet Malcolm (1934-2021), Journalist and nonfiction writer, discusses growing up in the Czech émigré community of Yorkville in the 1940s in Still Pictures: On Photography and Memory (2023).
- The Marx Brothers, comedians, lived at 179 East 93rd Street
- Henry Miller (1891–1980), author, was born in Yorkville
- John P. Morrissey (1885–1966), electrical engineer and politician who served in both houses of the New Jersey Legislature
- U.S. President Barack Obama (born 1961), lived in the early 1980s at 339 East 94th Street, before and after his graduation from Columbia University
- Martin J. Scott (1865–1954), Jesuit author who was a priest at St. Ignatius Loyola Church from 1902 to 1915
- Georgette Seabrooke (1916–2011), muralist, artist, illustrator, art therapist, non-profit chief executive and educator, who is best known for her 1936 mural, Recreation in Harlem at Harlem Hospital Center
- Robert F. Wagner (1877–1953), U.S. Senator, after whom the middle school at 220 East 76th Street is named
- Multiple mayors have lived at Gracie Mansion.

== In popular culture ==
- In the novels The Godfather Returns and The Godfather's Revenge by Mark Winegardner, Michael Corleone's penthouse is in Yorkville.
- The children's book series by Bernard Waber starring Lyle the Crocodile started in 1962 with The House on East 88th Street, and is set in Yorkville.
- In the sitcom How I Met Your Mother, Barney Stinson's apartment is located at East 81st Street and 1st Avenue in Yorkville.

== Gallery ==
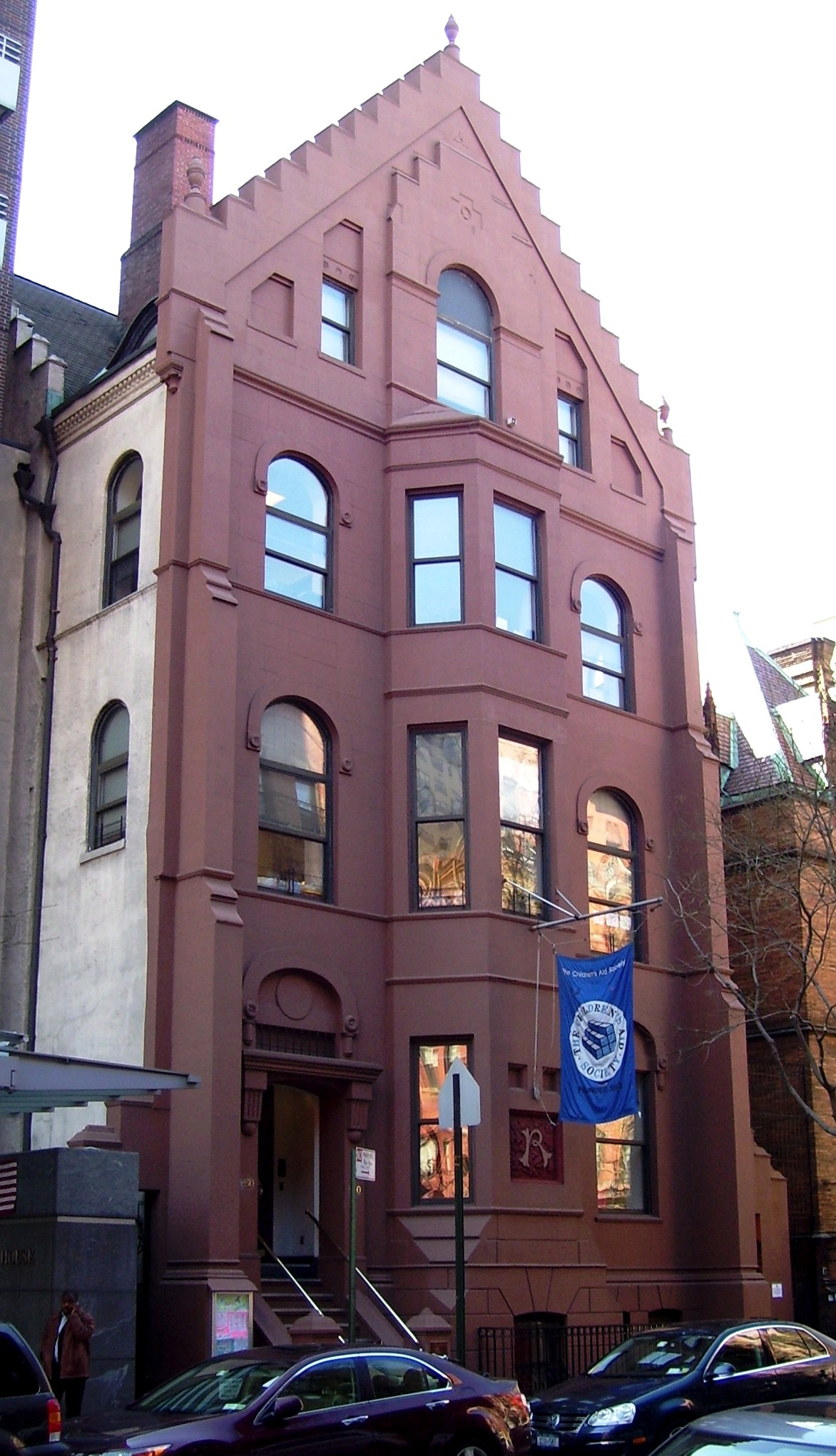
The Rhinelander Children's Center, of the Children's Aid Society

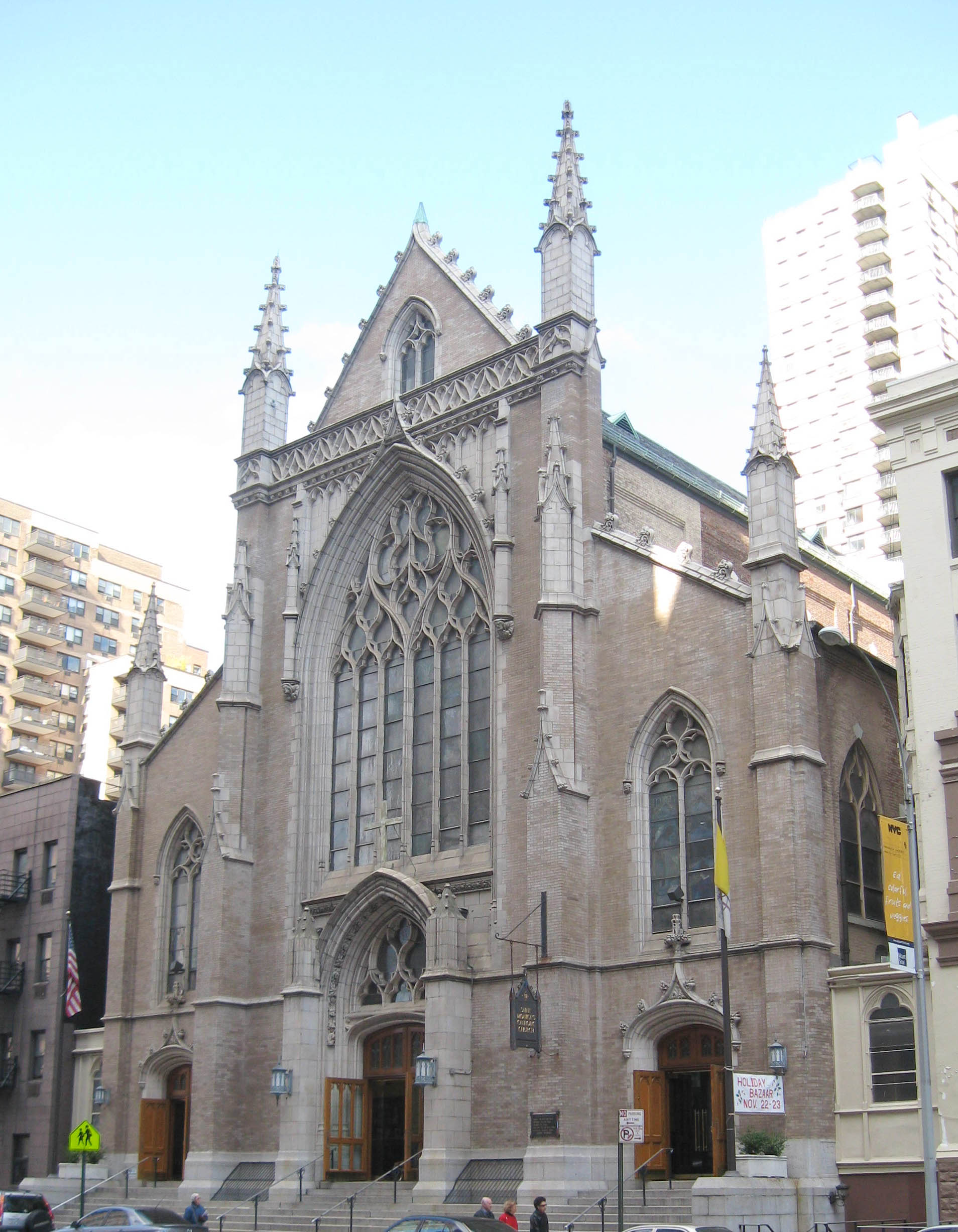
Church of St. Monica on 79th Street

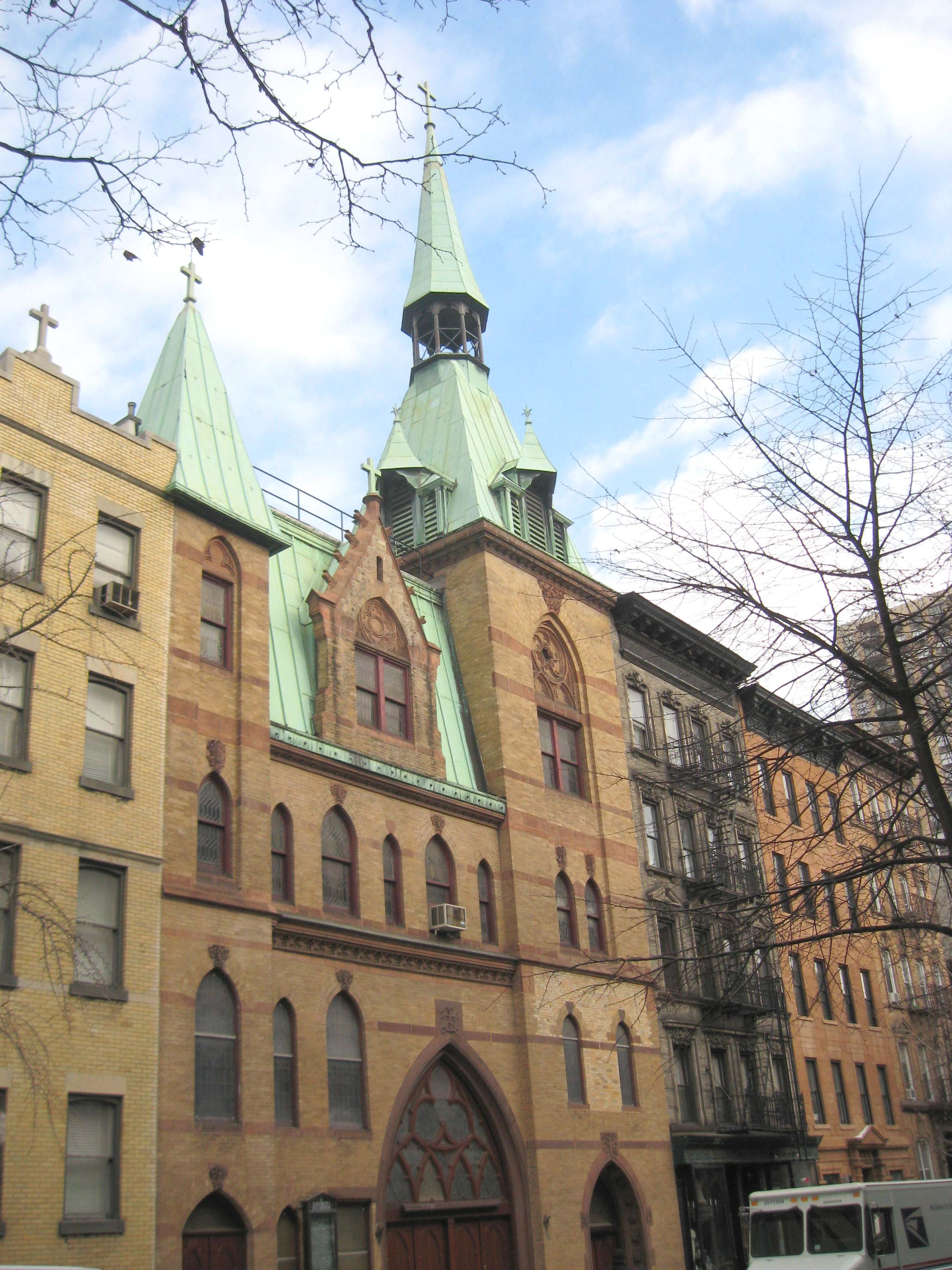
Church of St. Elizabeth of Hungary on 83rd Street

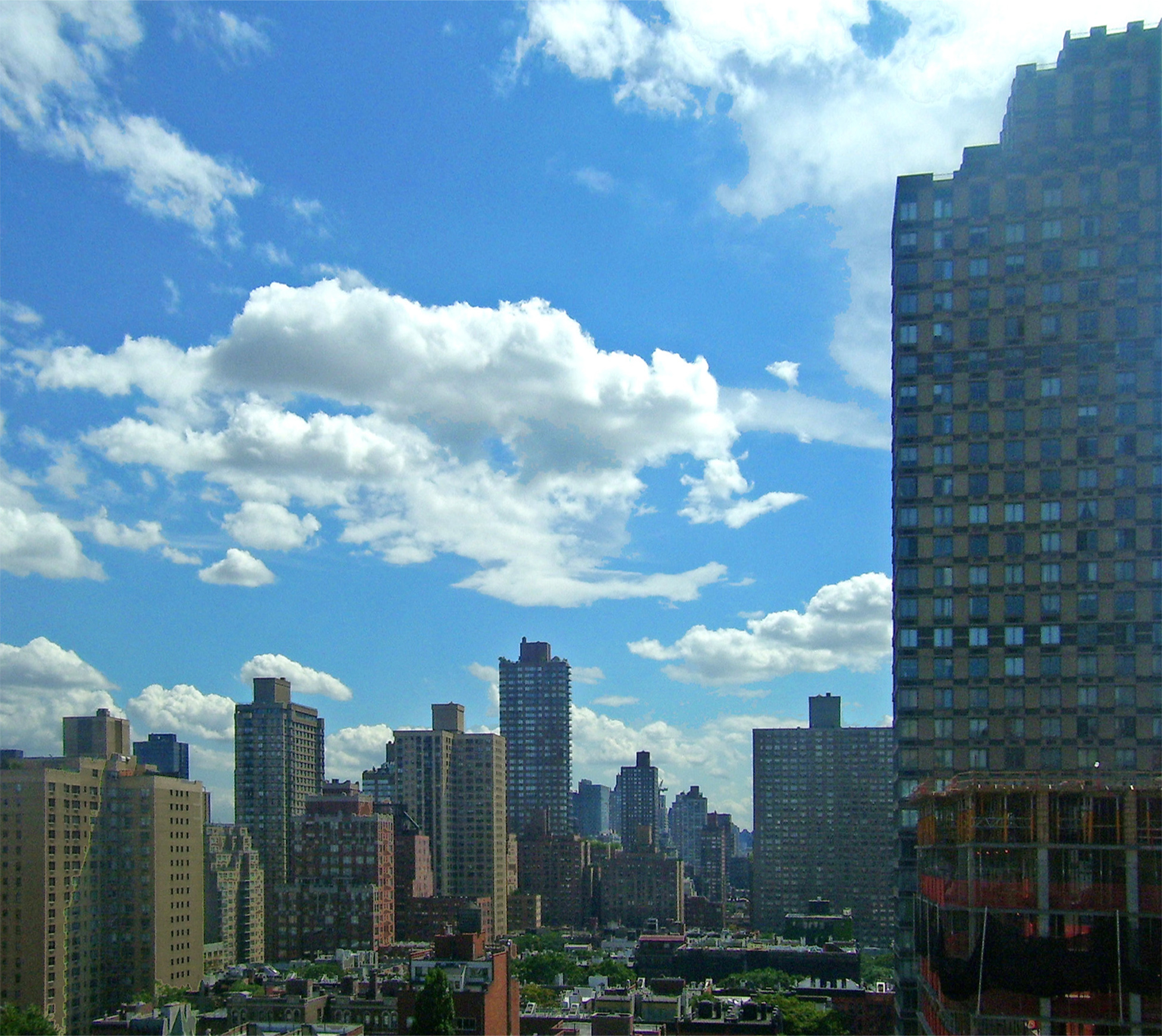
View of Yorkville at 86th Street

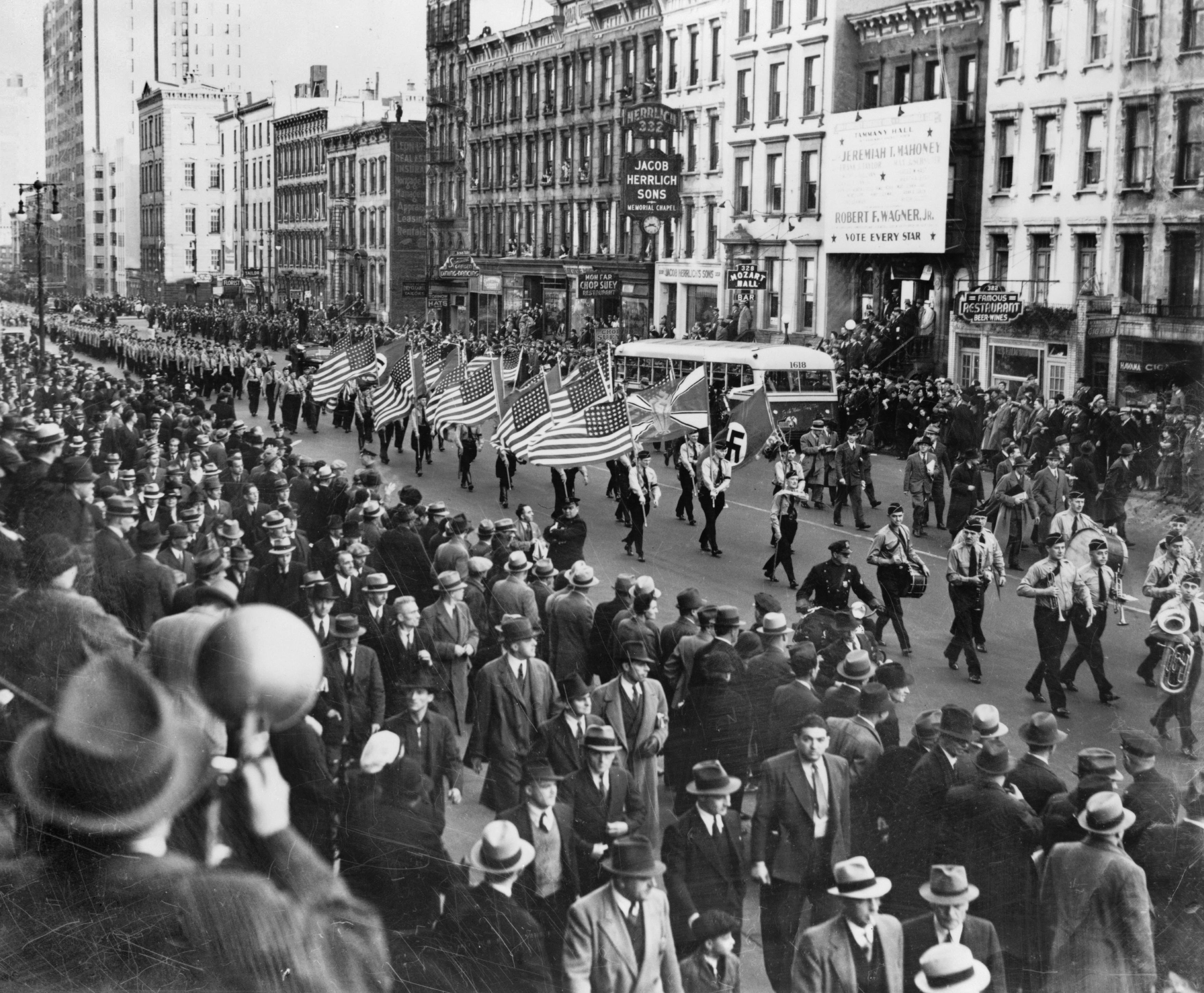
Parade of German American Bund held on October 30, 1939, on 86th Street, between First and Second Avenues.

== See also ==
- York Avenue Estate, in the southeastern part of the neighborhood
