= 86th Street station (IRT Lexington Avenue Line) =

New York City Subway station in Manhattan

86 Street
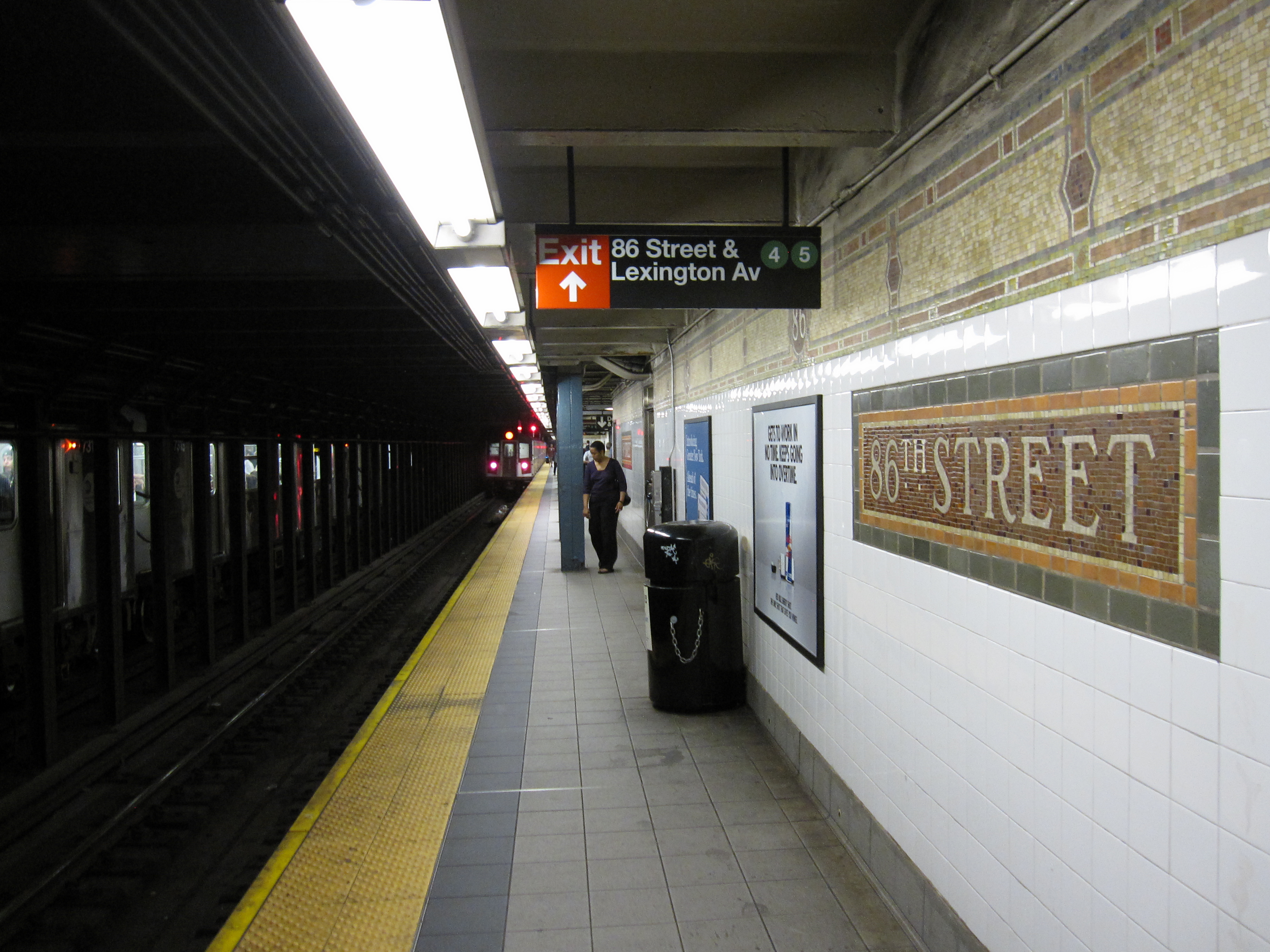
- R142A 6 train leaving the downtown local platform

Station statistics
- Address: East 86th Street & Lexington Avenue; New York, New York
- Borough: Manhattan
- Locale: Upper East Side
- Coordinates: 40.779469°N 73.955626°W
- Division: A (IRT)
- Line: IRT Lexington Avenue Line
- Services: 4 (all times); 5 (all times except late nights); 6 (all times) <6> (weekdays until 8:45 p.m., peak direction)
- Transit: NYCT Bus: M86 SBS, M98, M101, M102, M103; MTA Bus: BxM1, BxM6, BxM7, BxM8, BxM9, BxM10
- Structure: Underground
- Levels: 2
- Platforms: 4 side platforms (2 on each level)
- Tracks: 4 (2 on each level)

Other information
- Opened: July 17, 1918 (108 years ago)
- Accessible: Partially; full access under construction (Northbound local platform only; northbound express and southbound accessibility under construction)

Traffic
- 2025: 11,202,266 ▲1.3%
- Rank: 19 out of 423
Services
Preceding station	New York City Subway	Following station
125th Street 4 5 via 138th Street–Grand Concourse	Express	59th Street 4 5 via Franklin Avenue–Medgar Evers College
96th Street 4 6 <6> toward Pelham Bay Park	Local	77th Street 4 6 <6> toward Brooklyn Bridge–City Hall
Location
Location within New York City Subway
Location within New York City
Location within New York
Track layout
Upper level
Lower level
Street map
Station service legend
Symbol	Description
Stops all times except late nights	Stops all times except late nights
Stops all times	Stops all times
Stops late nights only	Stops late nights only
Stops rush hours in the peak direction only	Stops rush hours in the peak direction only
- 86th Street Subway Station (Dual System IRT)
- U.S. National Register of Historic Places
- New York State Register of Historic Places
- MPS: New York City Subway System MPS
- NRHP reference No.: 05000236
- NYSRHP No.: 06101.007645

Significant dates
- Added to NRHP: March 30, 2005
- Designated NYSRHP: December 18, 2004

The 86th Street station is an express station on the IRT Lexington Avenue Line of the New York City Subway. Located at the intersection of Lexington Avenue and 86th Street on the Upper East Side, it is served by the 4 and 6 trains at all times, the 5 train at all times except late nights, and the <6> train during weekdays in peak direction.

The 86th Street station was constructed for the Interborough Rapid Transit Company (IRT) as part of the Dual Contracts. The station opened on July 17, 1918, as part of the IRT's Lexington Avenue and Jerome Avenue lines from Grand Central–42nd Street to 167th Street. The station's platforms were extended in the early 1960s. It was also renovated in the 1970s, in 1986, and from 2002 to 2004.

The 86th Street station contains four side platforms and four tracks, split across two levels. Local trains use the upper level, which has two tracks and two side platforms, while express trains use the lower level, which are arranged in the same layout. The station was built with tile and mosaic decorations. The upper platforms contain exits to Lexington Avenue and 86th Street, as well as stairs to and from the lower platforms. Unlike at most express stations, the respective pairs of northbound and southbound platforms are not connected to each other within fare control. The station interior is listed on the National Register of Historic Places.

== History ==
=== Construction and opening ===
Following the completion of the original subway, there were plans to construct a line along Manhattan's east side north of 42nd Street. The original plan for what became the extension north of 42nd Street was to continue it south through Irving Place and into what is now the BMT Broadway Line at Ninth Street and Broadway. In July 1911, the IRT had withdrawn from the talks, and the Brooklyn Rapid Transit Company (BRT) was to operate on Lexington Avenue. The IRT submitted an offer for what became its portion of the Dual Contracts on February 27, 1912. As workers were blasting through the rock to excavate the tunnel, in March 1912, part of the roadway caved into the excavation site at 87th Street.

In 1913, as part of the Dual Contracts, which were signed on March 19, 1913, the Public Service Commission planned to split the original Interborough Rapid Transit Company (IRT) system from looking like a "Z" system (as seen on a map) to an H-shaped system. The original system would be split into three segments: two north–south lines, carrying through trains over the Lexington Avenue and Broadway–Seventh Avenue Lines, and a west–east shuttle under 42nd Street. This would form a roughly H-shaped system. It was predicted that the subway extension would lead to the growth of the Upper East Side and the Bronx.

The 86th Street station opened on July 17, 1918, with service initially running between Grand Central–42nd Street and 167th Street via the line's local tracks. On August 1, the "H system" was put into place, with through service beginning on the new east and west side trunk lines, and the institution of the 42nd Street Shuttle along the old connection between the sides. The station's lower level opened on this date with the inauguration of express service. The cost of the extension from Grand Central was $58 million.

=== Station renovations ===
==== 1920s to 1990s ====
The city government took over the IRT's operations on June 12, 1940. In late 1959, contracts were awarded to extend the platforms at Bowling Green, Wall Street, Fulton Street, Canal Street, Spring Street, Bleecker Street, Astor Place, Grand Central, 86th Street and 125th Street to 525 feet (160 m) to accommodate ten-car trains.

In 1970, with the construction of a Gimbels department store directly above, Gimbels agreed to renovate the station's entrances. For over a year, community members had asked Gimbels to include an entrance into the store's basement from the subway. While the renovation took place mostly in the fare control areas, work was also done to fix the station's lighting, walls, floors, turnstiles, stairways, and token booths. The Gimbels store opened in 1972. The renovation project cost $405,000.

In 1983, the MTA added funding for a renovation of the 86th Street station to its 1980–1984 capital plan. The station was renovated again in 1986 as part of a move to prevent the existing New York City Subway stations from falling apart after years of deferred maintenance. This was evidenced by the addition of the then standard orange platform edge in addition to the yellow platform edge that was originally there. The I-beams were painted red instead of the original blue and the other parts of the station were fixed.

==== 2000s to present ====
This station was renovated in 2003, along with the 77th Street and 116th Street stations on the Lexington Avenue Line. As part of the project, structural deficiencies were repaired, signage and lighting were enhanced, electrical service was upgraded, station facilities were rehabilitated, new fare arrays and a new token booth were installed, and portions of the station were upgraded to be compliant with the Americans with Disabilities Act of 1990. In addition, visual clutter was eliminated, and artwork was installed. The contract for the station renovation project, which was expected to take two year, was expected to be advertised in October 2000. The contract for these three stations was awarded in October 2001, and the projects were done in-house. The cost of the work at 86th Street station was $27.3 million, of which $20.3 million came from the Federal government.

In fall 2004, the station renovation project was completed. It consisted of repainting the I-beams from red to dark blue, as well as the removal of train arrival devices on the upper level that gave notices of approaching express trains on the lower level, among other things; the latter was replaced with countdown clocks, on both levels, which performed the same function. This station was added to the National Register of Historic Places on March 30, 2005.

An ADA-accessible elevator to the northbound local platform was added in the 2010s, opening in 2020. The rest of the station remained inaccessible, since there was no elevator from the local platform to the express platform and no elevators on the southbound side. Accessibility of the entire station was proposed in August 2019 as part of the MTA's "Fast Forward" program. A request for proposals was put out on May 18, 2023 for the contract for a project bundle to make 13 stations accessible, including completing work at 86th Street. The contract for three additional elevators was awarded that December. Work was initially proposed to be completed in 2026 but was delayed due to issues such as changes in the timeline and the discovery of utilities not marked on maps. In October 2026, the MTA announced plans to install taller fare gates with glass panels at 20 additional stations, including the 86th Street station, following a successful pilot program at earlier stations.

== Station layout ==
This underground station has two levels, each with two tracks and two side platforms. Each platform is 525 feet (160 m) long and up to 14 feet (4.3 m) wide. The upper level serves local trains while the lower level, located approximately 48 feet (15 m) below ground, serves express trains. The 4 and 6 stop here at all times, and the 5 stops here at all times except late nights. There is no express service during late nights and the lower level is closed during that period. The next stop to the north is 96th Street for local trains and 125th Street for express trains, while the next stop to the south is 77th Street for local trains and 59th Street for express trains.

On each side, four staircases connect the levels: two each near the center of either platform and one each toward the northern and southern ends. There are no crossovers or crossunders between the platforms, making this one of only two express stations in the system where free transfers between opposite directions are not possible. (Note: The other is Bergen Street, whose lower level is closed, on the IND Culver Line). Until 2021, Nostrand Avenue on the IND Fulton Street Line also did not allow free transfers between directions, although it was an express station.)

Because the Dual Contracts specified that the street surfaces needed to remain intact during the system's construction, a temporary web of timber supports was erected to support the streets overhead while the platforms were being constructed. The tunnel is covered by a U-shaped trough that contains utility pipes and wires. The outer walls of this trough are composed of columns, spaced approximately every 5 feet (1.5 m) with concrete infill between them. There is a 1-inch (25 mm) gap between the tunnel wall and the trackside wall, which is made of 4-inch (100 mm)-thick brick covered over by a tiled finish. Additional columns between the tracks, spaced every 5 feet (1.5 m), support the jack-arched concrete station roofs. Teal columns run along all four platforms at regular intervals.

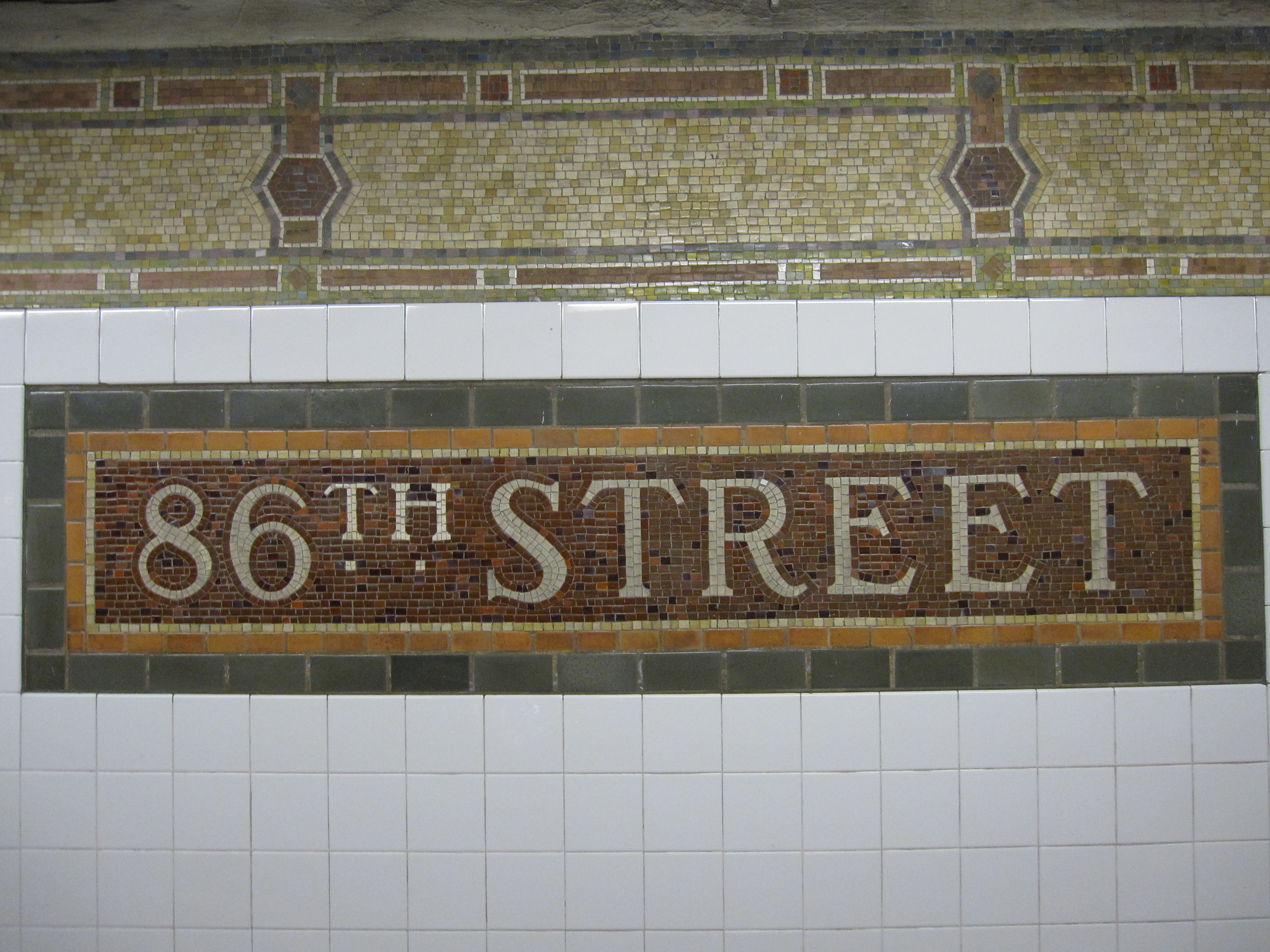
Name tablet

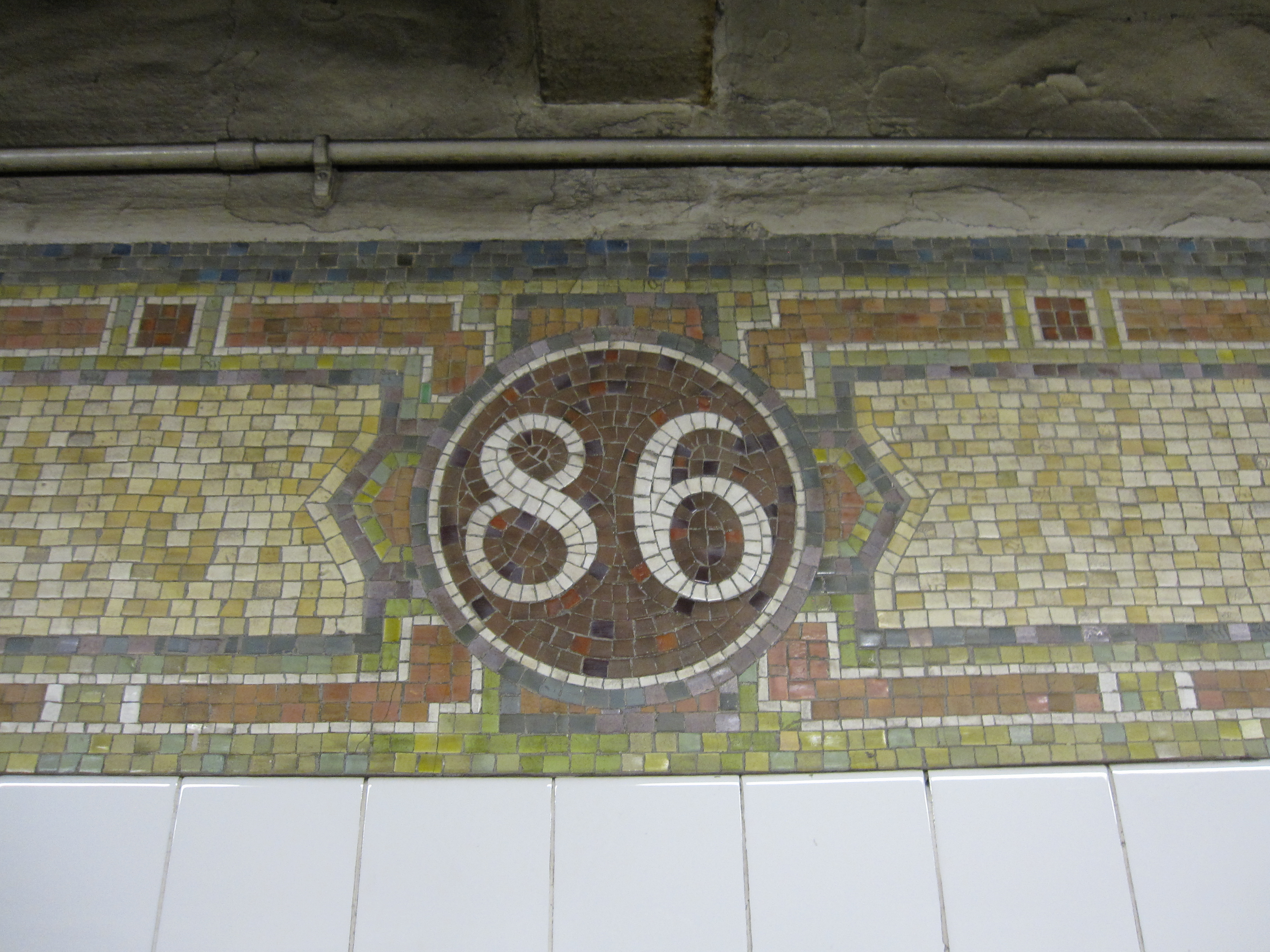
Trim line tablet

The walls along all four platforms are clad with white ceramic tiles. The ceramic tiles were installed during the early-2000s renovation and are raised about 1/4 inch (6.4 mm) from the original layer of tile. At the top of each wall is a colored mosaic frieze consisting mostly of yellows and browns. Small "86" tablets in a circle run along this frieze. The name tablets have "86TH STREET" in a white serif font on a reddish-brown background with a buff-colored inner border and green outer border. Similar tile signs reading "DOWNTOWN TRAINS" and "UPTOWN TRAINS", accompanied by white arrows, are on the walls. At the extreme southern ends of all four platforms, there are tan terracotta blocks and a darker trim line with "86TH ST" written on it in white sans serif font at regular intervals.

Each upper-level platform has one same-level fare control area in the center. The southbound side has a turnstile bank and token booth. The northbound fare control has an unstaffed turnstile bank.

The 2004 artwork here is called Happy City by Peter Sis. It consists of four different glass and etched stone mosaic murals in the shapes of huge eyes surrounded by various animals and objects. They are located at each stop of the four staircases near the fare control areas that go down to the lower level express platforms.

=== Exits ===
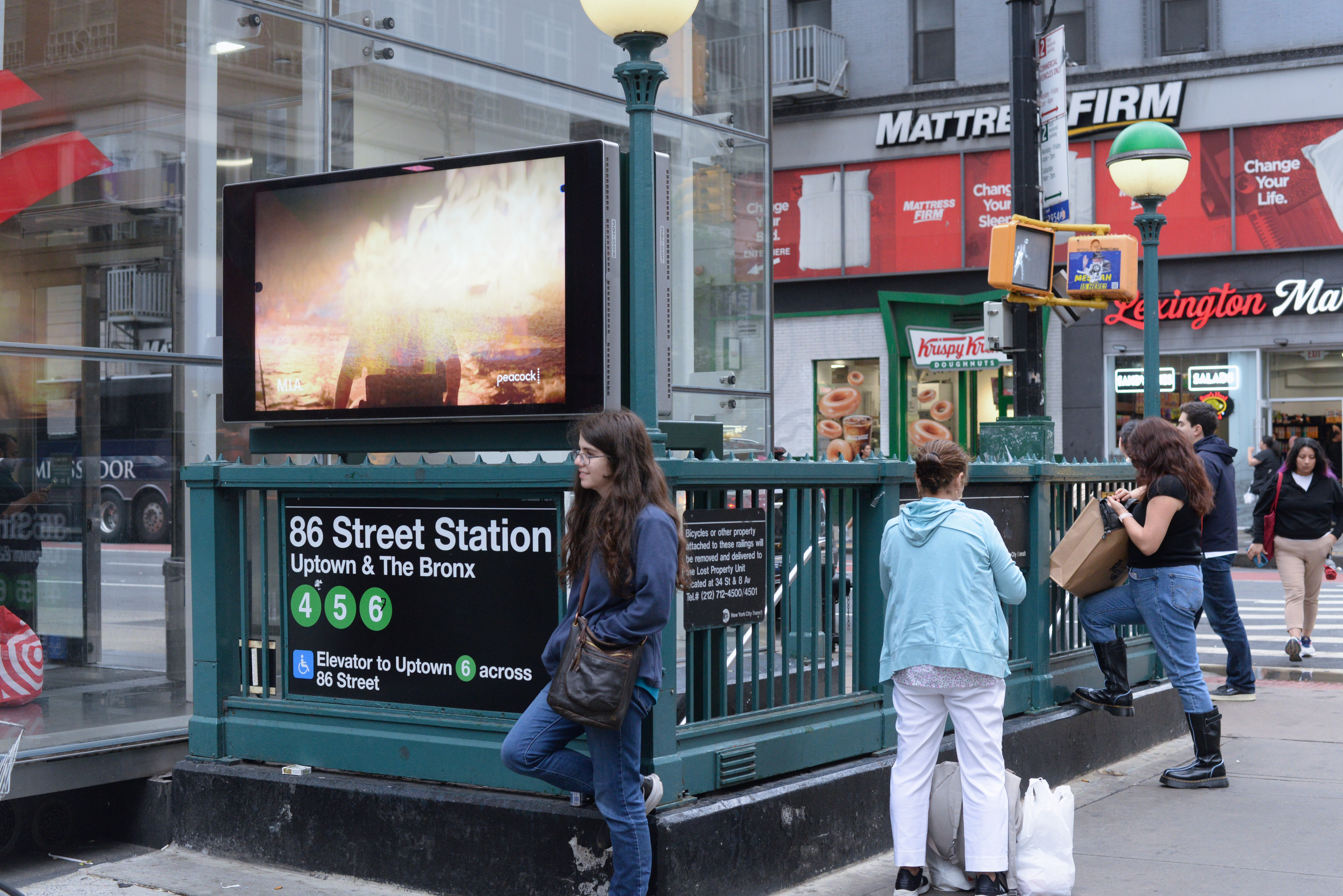
Uptown entrance

This station has separate entrances for the northbound and southbound platforms. All of the entrances are at the intersection of Lexington Avenue and 86th Street.

From the southbound fare control, two staircases go up to the southwest corner of East 86th Street and Lexington Avenue, and two more that are built inside a Best Buy store on the northwest corner of the same intersection.

From the northbound fare control, there is an unstaffed turnstile bank and two staircases going up to the southeast corner of East 86th Street and Lexington Avenue. An additional staircase and an elevator rise to the northeast corner. The elevator and staircase replace two narrow staircases formerly located inside a now-demolished shopping arcade at that corner. The elevator and staircase installations are part of the construction of a luxury residential tower at 147 East 86th Street.

== Notable places nearby ==
- Central Park
- Church of St. Ignatius Loyola
- Cooper–Hewitt, National Design Museum
- Metropolitan Museum of Art
- 225 East 86th Street
- National Academy of Design
- Neue Galerie New York
- 1040 Fifth Avenue
- Regis High School
- Solomon R. Guggenheim Museum

== See also ==
- National Register of Historic Places listings in Manhattan from 59th to 110th Streets
