= August Adolph Gennerich =

American bodyguard (1887–1936)

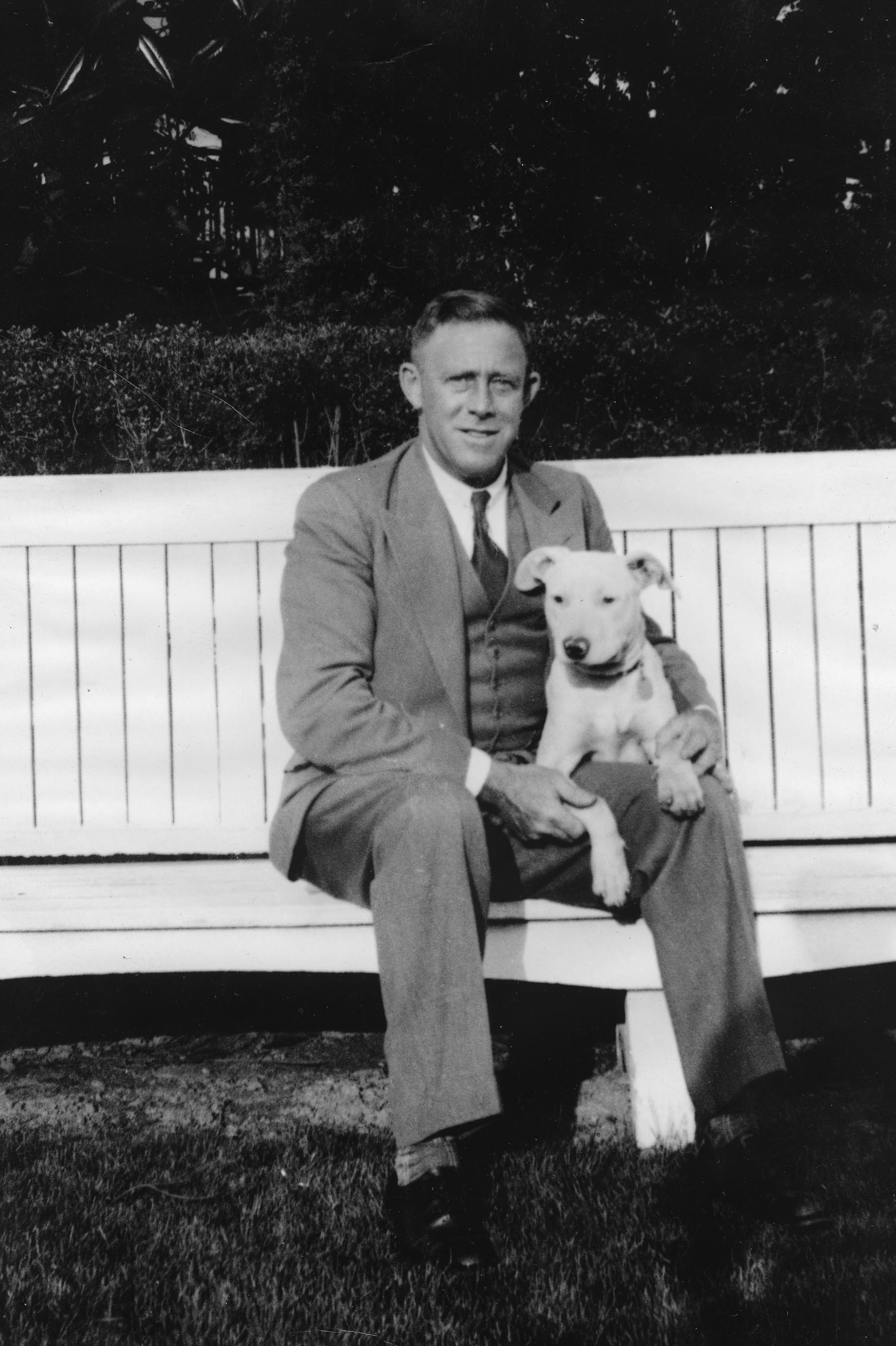
- Born: August Adolph Gennerich; February 10, 1887; Yorkville, Manhattan, New York, U.S.
- Died: December 1, 1936 (aged 49); Buenos Aires, Argentina
- Resting place: New York City, U.S.
- Known for: Bodyguard to President Franklin D. Roosevelt
- Police career
- Department: New York City Police Department; United States Secret Service
- Service years: 1909–1933 (NYPD); 1933–1936 (USSS)

August Adolph Gennerich (February 10, 1887 – December 1, 1936) was an American police officer, U.S. Secret Service Agent, and the bodyguard of Franklin D. Roosevelt.

== Early life ==
Gennerich was born on February 10, 1887, in Yorkville, Manhattan, New York.

== Career ==
In 1909, Gennerich became a police officer with the New York City Police. He was cited three times for bravery, once for capturing bandits who "had peppered him for a mile and a half" with a machine gun until their car overturned. He later became a member of the bomb squad. In 1929 he was assigned as a bodyguard whenever New York's governor was in the city. He was assigned to Albany with then-Governor Roosevelt.

In the winter of 1933, when the Roosevelts moved to Washington, D.C., Gennerich was given a 60-day leave of absence so that he could complete his 25 years on the force, and retire on a $1,500-a-year pension. This allowed him to join the United States Secret Service and continue to work as President Roosevelt's bodyguard. The very first executive order issued by the newly appointed President Roosevelt was Order 6071, which ensured Gennerich would be able to resume his position as Roosevelt's bodyguard immediately. Gennerich had grown close to Roosevelt and his family; Eleanor Roosevelt said in an edition of her newspaper column My Day that "He was cheerful, kindly and always willing to think of other people. He would play the piano for hours to amuse the children at Warm Springs. One and all they loved him."

== Death ==
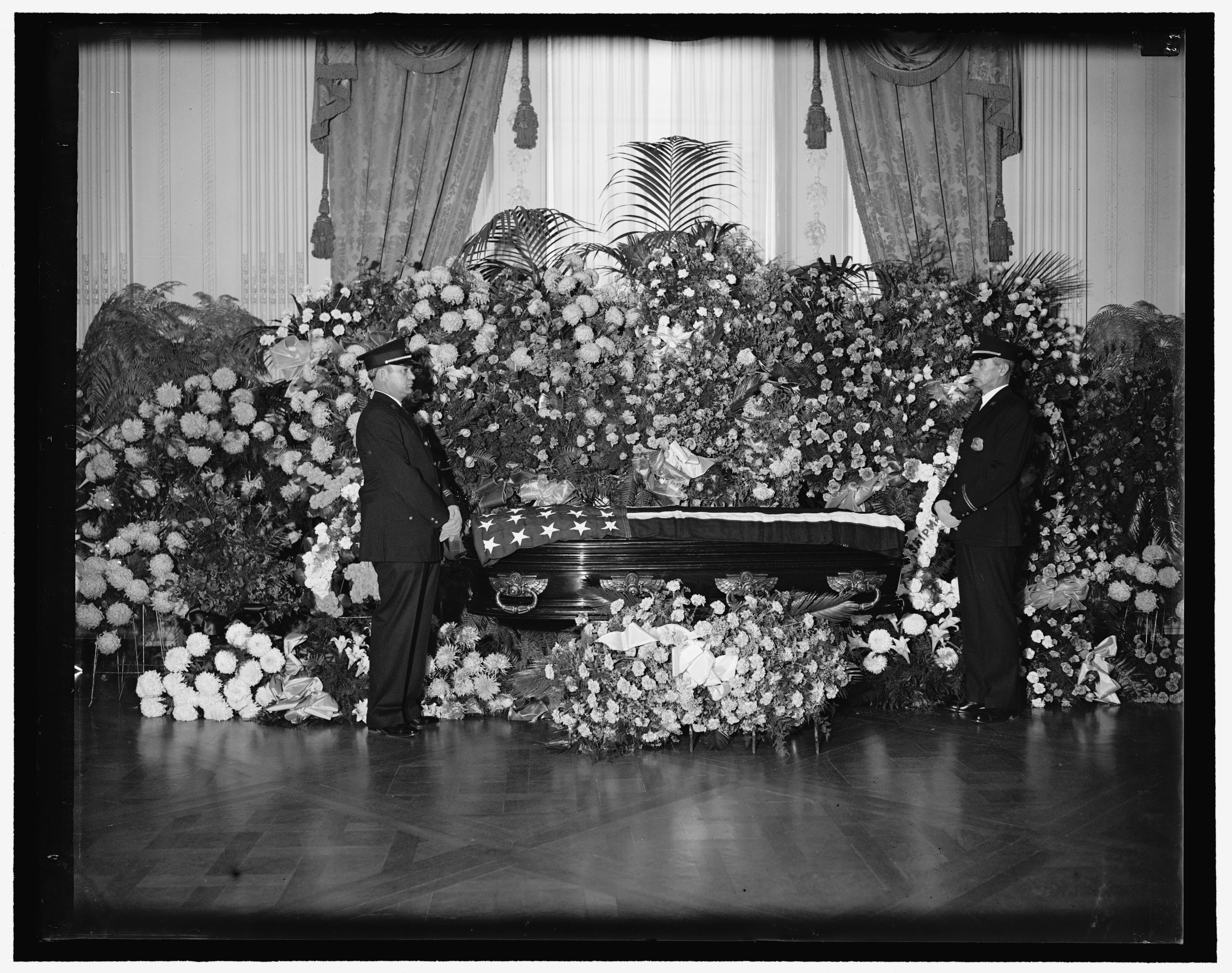
Gennerich lying in state at the White House in 1936

Gennerich died of a heart attack in the early hours of December 1, 1936, in Buenos Aires, Argentina, while dancing in a restaurant. Gennerich was 50. Following his death, his body was returned to Washington DC on the USS Indianapolis and was laid in state in the East Room of the White House on December 16; he was subsequently buried in New York City. In a letter to his wife shortly after Gennerich's death, Franklin Roosevelt wrote "Good old Gus was the kind of loyal friend who simply cannot be replaced".
