= 86th Street (Manhattan) =

West-east street in Manhattan, New York

- German Broadway
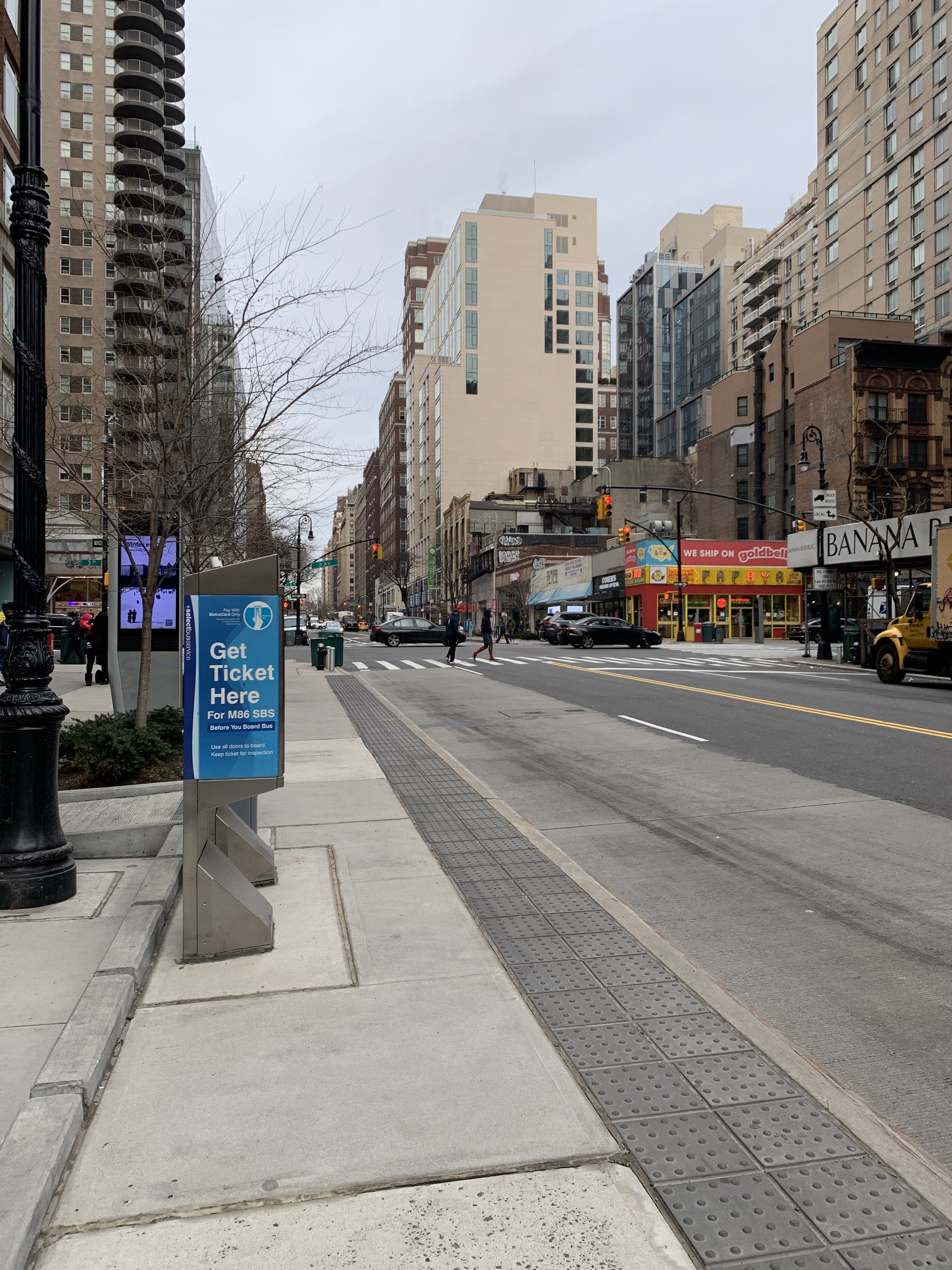
- Looking west on East 86th Street near Third Avenue
- Maintained by: NYCDOT
- Length: 1.6 mi (2.6 km)
- Width: 100 feet (30.48 m)
- Location: Manhattan
- Postal code: 10024 (west), 10028 (east)
- Coordinates: 40.777877°N 73.951741°W
- West end: Riverside Drive in Upper West Side
- East end: East End Avenue in Yorkville
- North: 87th Street
- South: 85th Street

Construction
- Commissioned: 1811

86th Street is a major two-way street on the Upper East Side and Upper West Side of the New York City borough of Manhattan. It runs in two major sections: between East End and Fifth Avenue on the Upper East Side, and between Central Park West and Riverside Drive on the Upper West Side. The western segment feeds into the 86th Street transverse across Central Park, which connects to East 84th and 85th Streets on the eastern side.

On the West Side, its continuous cliff-wall of apartment blocks including The Belnord and the Orwell House is broken by two contrasting landmarked churches at prominent corner sites, the Tuscan Renaissance Saints Paul and Andrew United Methodist Church at the corner of West End Avenue, and the rusticated brownstone Romanesque Revival West-Park Presbyterian Church at the corner of Amsterdam Avenue.

== History ==
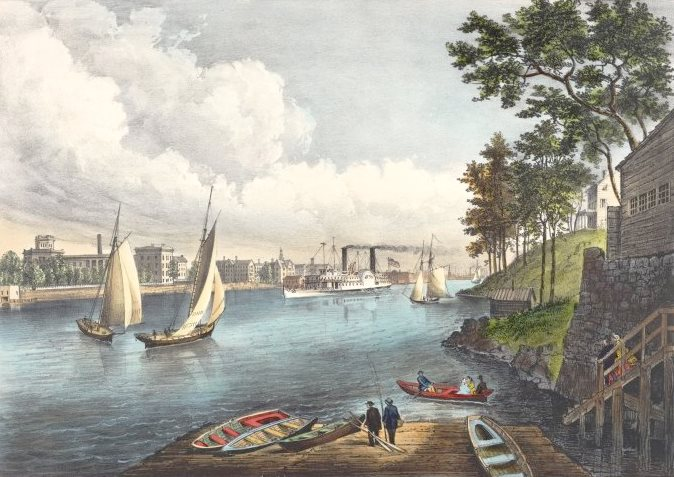
"Blackwells Island, East River, from Eighty Sixth Street", Currier & Ives, 1862: the villa overlooking the river had belonged to John Jacob Astor

The street was designated by the Commissioners' Plan of 1811 as one of 15 east-west streets that would be 100 feet (30 m) in width (while other streets were designated as 60 feet (18 m) in width).

Until the years following World War II, Yorkville on the East Side was a predominantly German community, and East 86th Street was nicknamed the German Broadway. The early settlement originally clustered around the 86th Street stop of the New York and Harlem Railroad. Since the late 1980s, nearly all distinctly German shops have disappeared, apart from a few restaurants on Second Avenue. The street was commonly considered a boundary for public utilities. For example, different telephone exchanges at East 79th and 97th Streets served the north and south sides of the street. Local number portability in the early 21st century allowed transferring phone numbers to either side.

A sunken street through Central Park, the 86th Street transverse, connects West 86th Street with eastbound East 84th Street and westbound East 85th Street. Miners Gate provides pedestrian access to the park at East 86th, and Mariners Gate at West 85th.

== Transportation ==
The M86 Select Bus Service bus serves the street between York Avenue and either Broadway (westbound) or West End Avenue (eastbound). At the east side of the Central Park transverse, eastbound buses use East 84th Street until Madison Avenue due to Fifth Avenue being a downtown-only corridor.

The New York and Harlem Railroad used to operate an 86th Street rail line which ran on the surface from Central Park West, through Central Park and on to York Avenue. The line then turned north and terminated at the Astoria Ferry landing at 92nd Street.

It is currently served by the following New York City Subway stations:

- 86th Street at Broadway serving the 1 and 2 trains
- 86th Street at Central Park West serving the A, B, and C trains
- 86th Street at Lexington Avenue serving the 4, 5, 6, and <6> trains
- 86th Street at Second Avenue serving the N, Q, and R trains

Until the 1950s, the Second Avenue and Third Avenue elevated lines served 86th Street on the East Side.

The New York Central Railroad's 86th Street station previously existed on Park Avenue, which now carries the Park Avenue main line of the Metro-North Railroad. The station opened in 1876. The station was last listed on the May 20, 1901 timetable and was left off the June 23, 1901 timetable. An emergency exit is the only vestige of the station's existence.

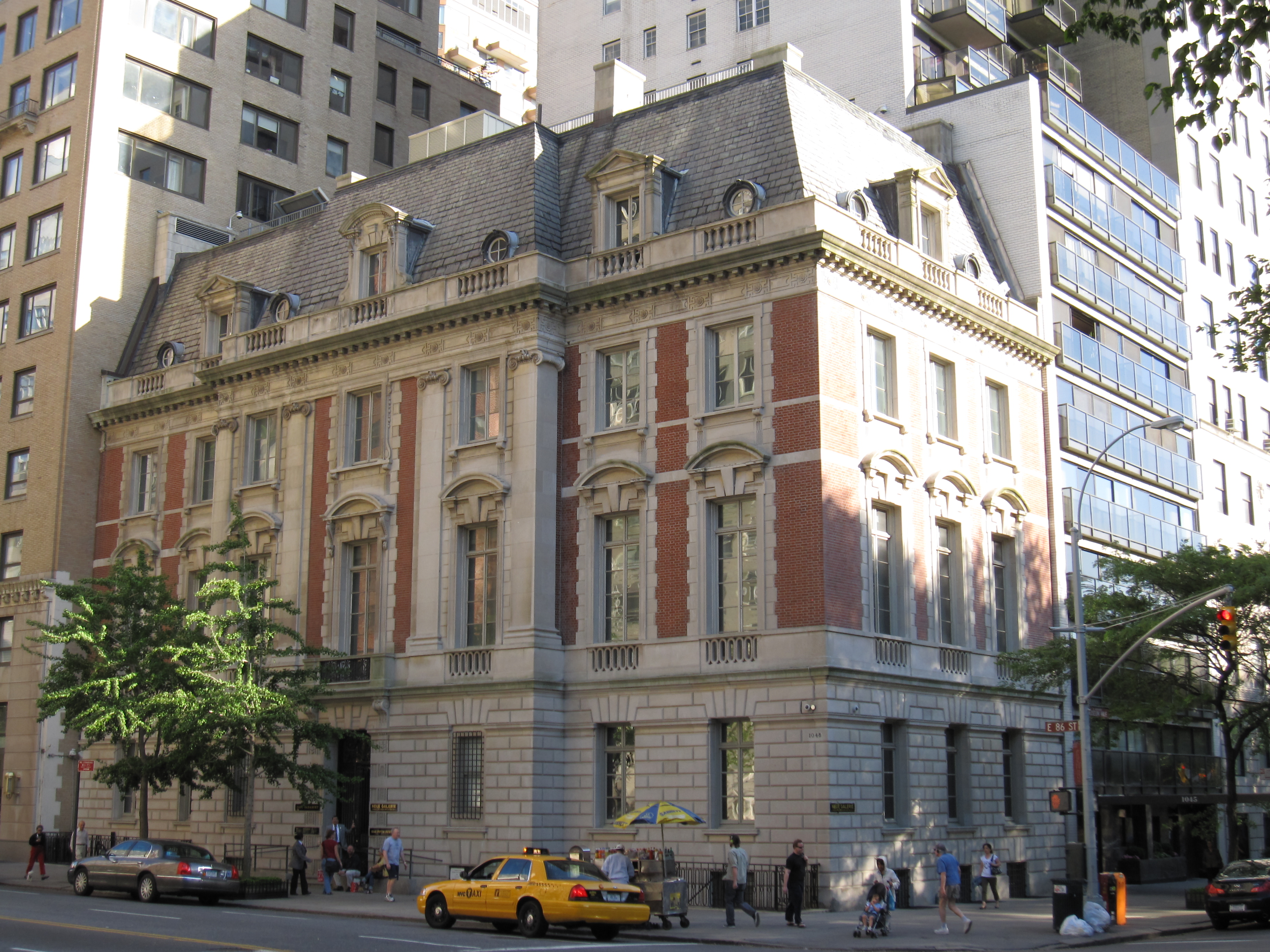
The William Starr Miller House, on the corner of Fifth Avenue

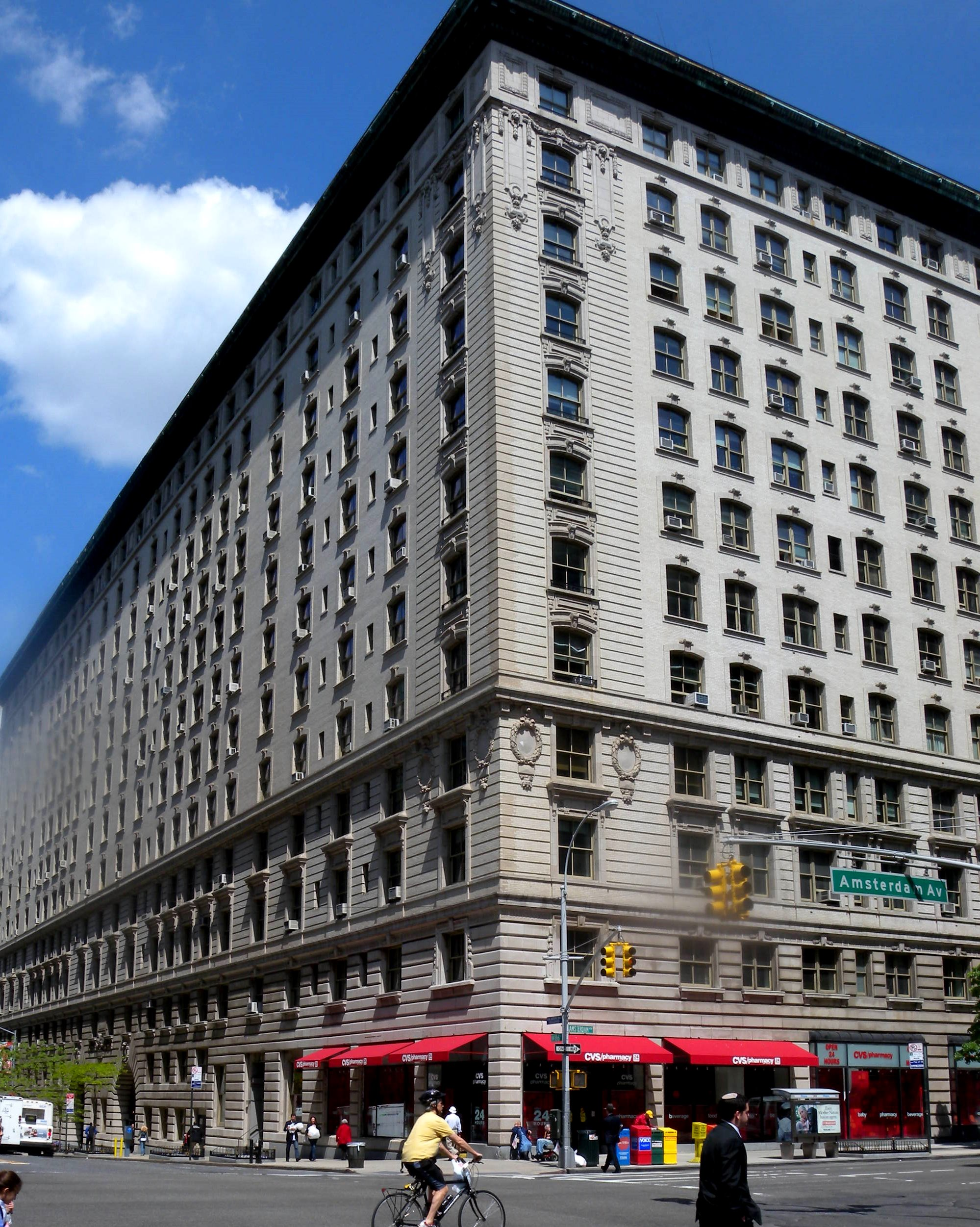
The Belnord, on the corner of Amsterdam Avenue

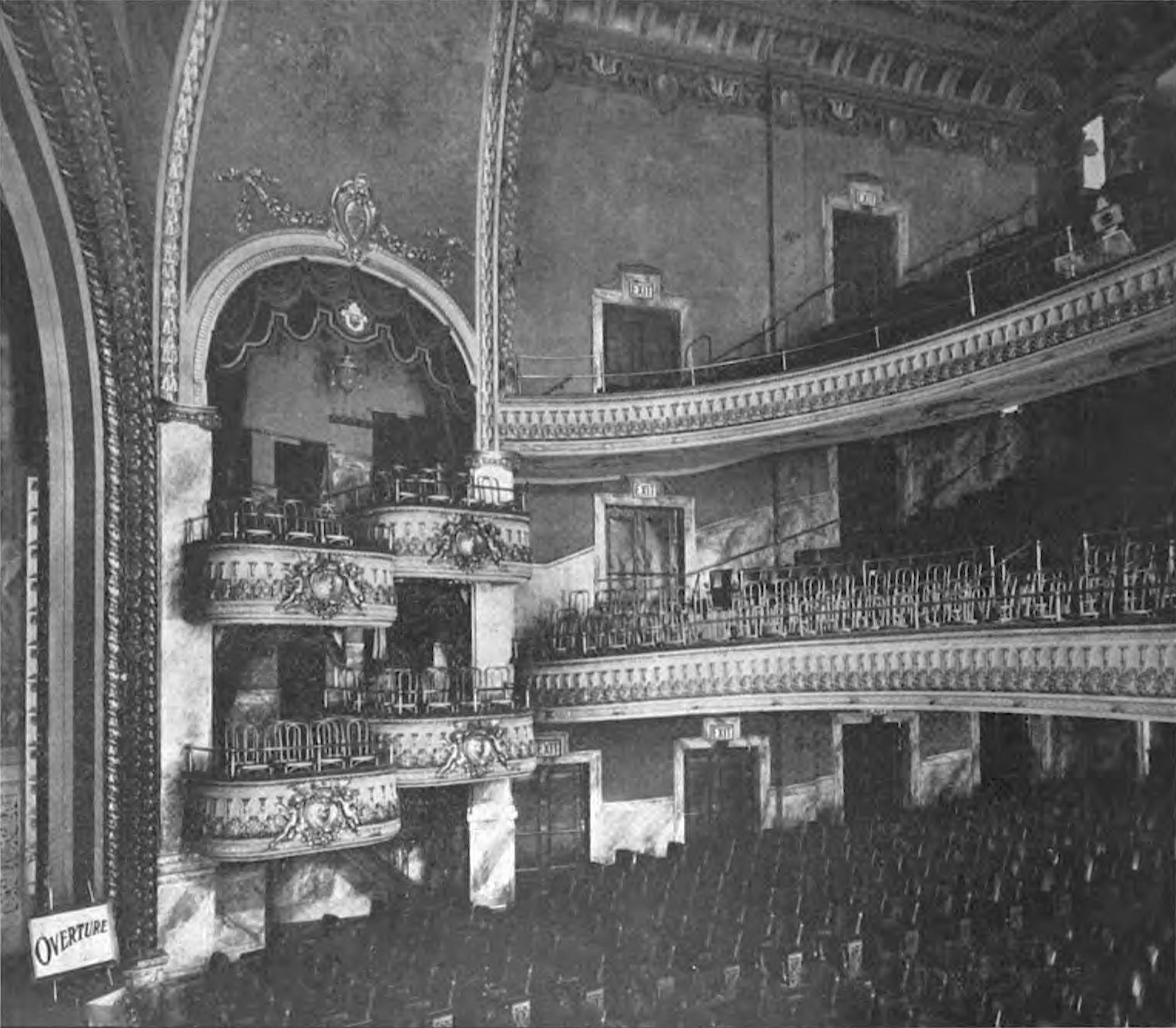
The demolished 86th Street Theatre near Third Avenue

== Notable residents ==
=== East ===
- Paula Barbieri – actress
- Elaine Kaufman (former) – owner and operator of Elaine's
- Rush Limbaugh (former) – radio talk show host
- Mary Tyler Moore (former) – actress
- Joe Namath (former) – professional football player
- John Paulson – hedge fund manager

=== West ===
- Diamond Jim Brady (former) – businessman and philanthropist
- Katie Couric (former) – news anchor
- Susan Crile – artist
- Tom Cruise (former) – actor, lived at 50 West 86th Street in 1981
- Art D'Lugoff (former) – owner of The Village Gate
- Robert Downey Jr./Sarah Jessica Parker (former) – actors; lived together at 50 West 86th Street
- Robert Duvall– actor
- Renee Fleming – opera "diva"
- Jami Floyd – TV anchor
- Joe Franklin – radio and television personality
- Andrew Goodman (former) – Queens College anthropology student, Freedom Summer volunteer of the Congress of Racial Equality, famed civil rights activist and martyr, close friend of Paul Simon
- William Randolph Hearst (former) – publishing magnate
- Amos E. Joel, Jr. (former) – inventor of the cellular phone
- John F. Kennedy Jr. (former) – publisher and son of John F. Kennedy
- Megyn Kelly – journalist, talk show host, and television news anchor
- Christine Lahti – actress
- Julianne Moore (former) – actress
- Grete Mosheim Gould – German silent film actress
- Zero Mostel (former) – actor
- Richard Rodgers (former) – composer
- Isabella Rossellini (former) – actress
- Emery Roth (former) – Beaux Arts and Art Deco architect who designed The Normandy where he lived
- Jerry Schatzberg – director
- Isaac Bashevis Singer (former) – Nobel Prize winning author; West 86th Street between Broadway and Amsterdam Avenue was renamed Isaac Bashevis Singer Boulevard in his honor
- Sorvino family:
  - Mira Sorvino – actress
  - Paul Sorvino (former) – actor
- Lee Strasberg (former) – acting teacher and actor
- Moon Zappa (former) – actress, musician and author, eldest daughter of Frank Zappa in the early 1990s

== See also ==
- Yorkville
- 225 East 86th Street, a building located on the block between Second and Third Avenues
- Henderson Place Historic District, at the eastern end of the street
