= Manhattan Chamber of Commerce =

- Formation: July 1920
- Founded: 1920
- Purpose: Advocating for NYC’s Businesses. Shaping Tomorrow’s Economy.
- Headquarters: 575 Fifth Avenue, 14th Floor; New York, NY 10017
- Region served: Manhattan borough of New York City, New York
- President and CEO: Jessica Walker
- Website: https://www.manhattancc.org/

The Manhattan Chamber of Commerce is a nonprofit organization that represents and supports the 125,000+ local businesses across the borough of Manhattan in New York City. Collectively, these businesses employ 2.4 million people and generate $939 billion in annual GDP.

== History ==
The Manhattan Chamber of Commerce was established in July 1920 as the Yorkville Chamber of Commerce. It was founded by 11 prominent merchants in the Yorkville neighborhood of Manhattan's Upper East Side, which at the time was inhabited predominantly by German-born immigrants. Their mission was “to foster and improve the trade and commerce of Yorkville…and to promote the prosperity and general welfare thereof". This was particularly important in the wake of World War I, when a wave of anti-German sentiment had spread throughout the United States. Over the decades, the Chamber expanded to encompass Mid-East Manhattan, then Mid-Manhattan and finally, the entire borough of Manhattan.

== Mission ==
The Chamber's core mission is to ignite growth, champion innovation, and advocate tirelessly for the interests of Manhattan's diverse business community. They do this through:

- Advocacy and Political Influence: The organization advocates for policies that support businesses in New York City. It works with elected officials and policymakers to influence legislation and regulations, with the goal of creating a favorable economic environment for Manhattan businesses.
- Networking and Connections: The organization offers various networking events, councils, and opportunities for members to connect. These events are designed to help business leaders, entrepreneurs, and innovators form partnerships and collaborate on projects.
- Business Resources: The organization provides a range of resources for its members, including educational workshops and business development programs. It also offers market insights and discounts to assist businesses with growth and operational challenges.
- Community and Economic Development: In addition to its member services, the organization is involved in the economic development of Manhattan. It supports initiatives that aim to attract investment, create jobs, and enhance the borough's economic competitiveness.

The Chamber also has two 501(c)3 nonprofit arms. Its foundation provides resources, education, and other programming to the business community. Its community benefit fund hosts two of the oldest and largest street fairs in the city with the proceeds allowing the Chamber to distribute emergency grants to small businesses.

== Leadership ==
The current President and CEO is Jessica Walker, who took the helm in February 2016. She sits on the Board of Directors of the Javits Center, Pursuit Lending, and United Neighborhood Houses. She is also an appointed member of the New York State Governor's Regional Economic Development Council for New York City.

The Chamber's Board Chairman is Don Winter, the founder and CEO of Encompass Media Group and the former publisher of Resident Magazine.

== Programs and Initiatives ==
To achieve its mission, the Chamber offers a comprehensive range of programs and initiatives focused on business services, networking, and advocacy, all designed to "Build Relationships. Grow Business. Influence the City."

Key Programs and Initiatives:

- AI + Digital Empowerment: This initiative helps businesses, especially small businesses and entrepreneurs, leverage artificial intelligence and digital tools for growth and efficiency.
- Industry Councils + Peer Groups: These platforms facilitate collaboration among business leaders, address significant issues facing New York City, and generate business referrals. They include high-level forums like the CEO Council, Destination Excellence Council, Economic Innovation Council, and NYC Abundance and Efficiency Council, as well as Business Referral Groups (BRGs).
- Networking + Lead Generation: The Chamber hosts various events such as "Networking Around Town" gatherings, Speed Networking sessions, Industry Mixers, "Shop Small Biz" Street Fairs, and a Supplier Diversity Conference & Expo.
- Small Business Help Desk: Launched in response to the challenges faced by small businesses, this service provides quick answers, resources, and personalized guidance. It offers free one-on-one consultations and has the "Chamber on the Go" program for neighborhood outreach.
- Storefront Resurgence Project: This initiative aims to revitalize Manhattan's commercial corridors by driving foot traffic, reducing vacancies, and supporting new "brick-and-mortar" businesses. Key activities include the Business Outreach + Technical Assistance, Storefront Facade Improvements, the Retail Storefront Accelerator, and the Storefront Business Coalition.
- Advocacy: The Chamber is a formidable force in City Hall and Albany, working to shape pro-business policies, reduce regulatory burdens, and ensure a favorable economic climate.

== Political Advocacy ==
The Chamber's advocacy work includes:

- Direct Representation: Engagement with elected officials and agencies in City Hall, Albany, and Washington D.C. to represent the interests of our members.
- Pro-Business Policy: A focus on shaping legislation to promote economic growth, advocating for fair taxation, sensible regulations, and vital infrastructure projects.
- Collective Influence: Ensuring the business community's perspective is integral to the policymaking process.

Recent political wins include:

- Significant changes to the state’s discovery reform laws which were allowing a growing numbers of defendants to walk on technicalities
- Significant improvements to the FAIR Business Practices Act before passage to shield local businesses from excessive litigation
- Passage of the Midtown South Mixed-Use Rezoning Plan to revamp a central hub in midtown
- Secured a $1.5 million line item in the city budget to fund small business outreach and technical assistance throughout the five boroughs
