= Henderson Place Historic District =

Historic district in Manhattan, New York

- U.S. National Register of Historic Places
- U.S. Historic district
- New York State Register of Historic Places
- New York City Landmark
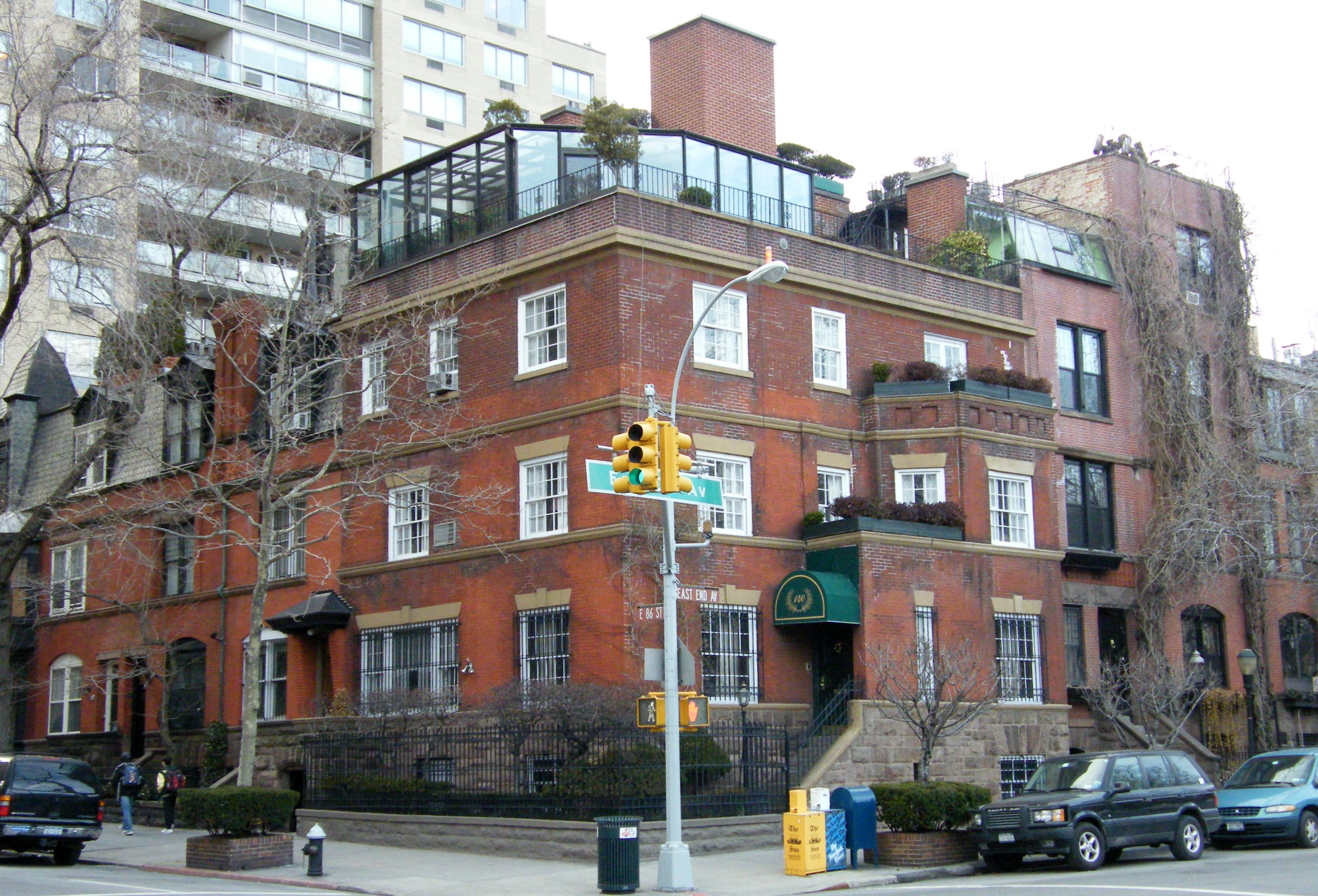
- East End Avenue at East 86th Street in 2009

- Location within Manhattan Location within New York City Location within New York Location within the United States
- Location: Henderson Pl., Manhattan, New York, US
- Coordinates: 40°46′31″N 73°56′42″W
- Area: 0.5 acres (0.20 ha)
- Built: 1880–1882
- Architect: Lamb and Rich
- Architectural style: Elizabethan-Flemish
- NRHP reference No.: 74001271
- NYCL No.: 0454

Significant dates
- Added to NRHP: June 20, 1974
- Designated NYSRHP: June 23, 1980
- Designated NYCL: February 11, 1969

The Henderson Place Historic District is a historic district in the Yorkville neighborhood of Manhattan in New York City, New York, US. The district spans about 0.5 acres (0.20 ha) bounded by 86th Street to the south, East End Avenue to the east, 87th Street to the north, and a dead-end street named Henderson Place to the west. It includes 24 attached brick rowhouses, all designed by Lamb and Rich in the Queen Anne style. The houses were built by the developer John C. Henderson for moderate-income residents. The district is designated a city landmark by the New York City Landmarks Preservation Commission and is on the National Register of Historic Places.

== Description ==
The Henderson Place Historic District is in the Yorkville section of the Upper East Side of Manhattan in New York City, New York, US. It spans about 0.5 acres (0.20 ha) bounded by 86th Street to the south, East End Avenue to the east, and 87th Street to the north. The district's western boundary is Henderson Place, a dead-end street extending north from 86th Street. Henderson Place is a private street. Parking spaces on the street are reserved for property owners, and the homeowners pay the cost of the street's repairs.

The enclave is named for its developer, John C. Henderson, and originally included 32 houses when built in 1882. The houses were all designed by Lamb and Rich in the Queen Anne style. On the west side of Henderson Place is the Henderson House apartment building, which replaced eight of the houses; two of Henderson House's ground-floor maisonettes lead directly to Henderson Place. The historic district encompasses the remaining 24 attached rowhouse buildings. These houses contain a combined 21 residential units; one unit spans two houses, and another spans three houses. The district includes the addresses at 552–558 East End Avenue, 549–553 East 86th Street, 6–16 Henderson Place, and 552–558 East 87th Street. The land lots measure 18 by 46 feet (5.5 by 14.0 m) across, significantly smaller than traditional rowhouses in New York City, which extended 100 feet (30 m) inward from the street.

The houses were intended to complement each other in design. The remaining units largely retain their original appearance with few alterations, and draw heavily on Elizabethan architectural influences. The houses have common architectural features, such as entryways shared between buildings, and include features shared by Lamb & Rich's other designs. In general, they contain three stories above a raised basement, and are set back from a front lawn. The visible portion of the basement is generally clad in sandstone, while the first and second stories are made of red brick. The decorations on each facade include gables, pediments, and parapets. The facades also include double-hung windows, protruding brick chimneys, protruding bay and oriel windows, and decorative square window panes. Some of the houses contain turrets, and Henderson Place also includes antique streetlights. The third story of each house is typically placed within a sloped mansard roof that is covered in slate tiles and contains protruding dormer windows. One of the houses, at the corner of 86th Street and East End Avenue, has a fully-built-out third story rather than a mansard roof. Similar remodelings have been undertaken on many of the houses on East End Avenue, so the mansard roofs of the East End Avenue houses are no longer continuous.

== History ==
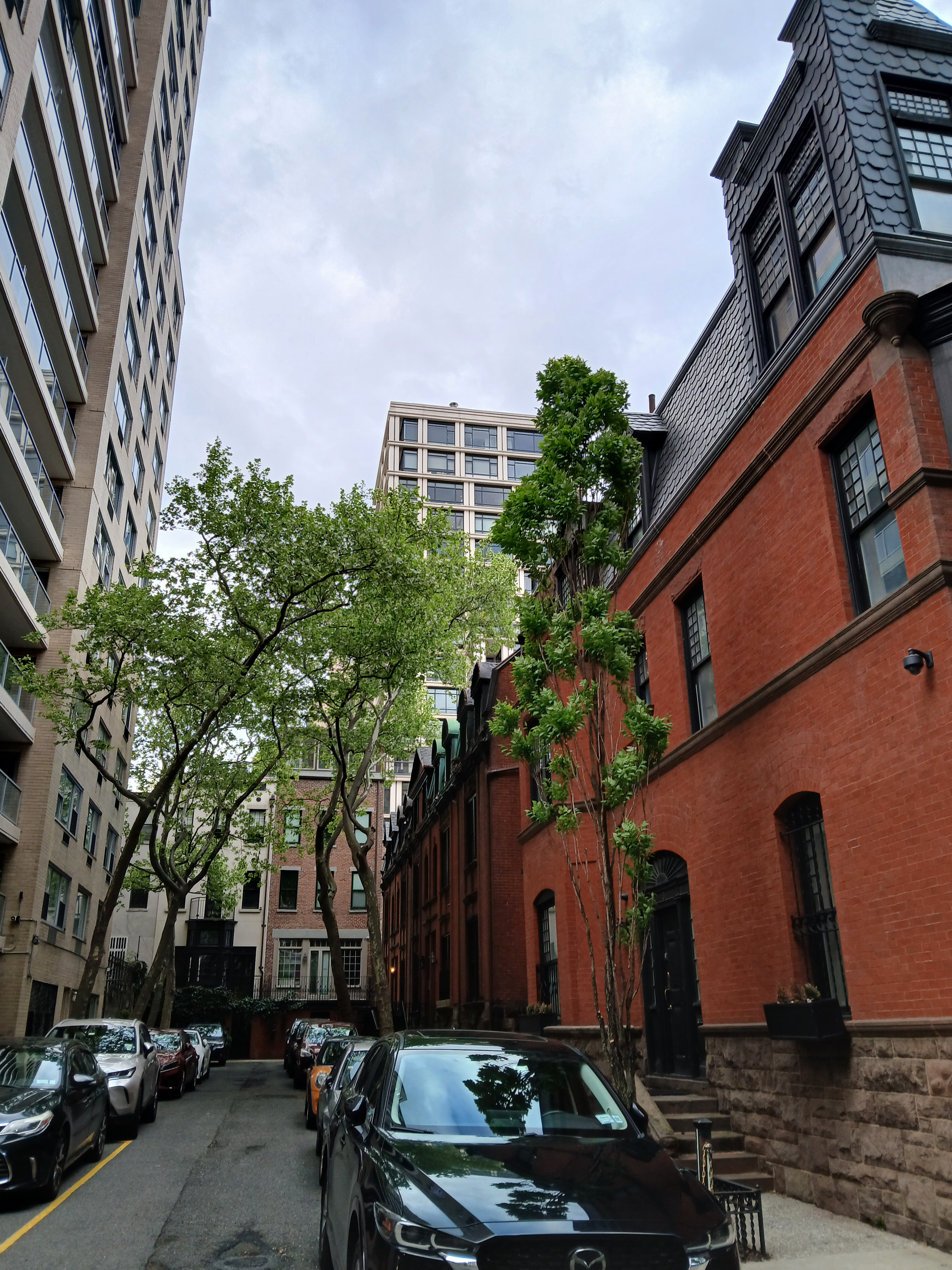
Properties on Henderson Place

The buildings are constructed on what was once the estate of William Waldron, an 18th-century landowner. At the time, what is now Yorkville was rural and undeveloped; the city limits of New York City were several miles south. During the 19th century, the site of the Henderson Place enclave contained a 13-acre (5.3 ha) summer retreat operated by John Jacob Astor, across from Gracie Mansion, the estate of Archibald Gracie. In the 1850s, Astor sold the land to real estate developer John C. Henderson, a prolific businessman who lived on Staten Island.

Henderson hired Lamb & Rich in 1880 to design a series of residences at 86th Street and East End Avenue (the latter of which was then known as Avenue B). 86th Street, one of the major crosstown streets of the Manhattan street grid, had just been paved at the time. Henderson developed the residences "for persons of moderate means", using them as rental properties. The houses were completed by 1882. Initially, the houses were rented for $650 annually (equivalent to $21,700 in 2025), less than for similar four- or five-story rowhouses that occupied larger land lots. The Henderson family owned many of the homes through the 20th century.

Many of the early residents were working-class. The historian Christopher Gray, writing for The New York Times in 2005, wrote that the houses' initial occupants included electricians, clerks, secretaries, and laborers. Initially, some of the houses had a half-dozen or more residents. The district's residents over the years have included the actor couple Alfred Lunt and Lynn Fontanne, the educator Millicent McIntosh, one of the Dukes of Richelieu, and the actor Tom Powers. By the early 20th century, the presence of several notable residents had raised the enclave's property values. Henderson Place was known as one of New York City's most exclusive residential enclaves until the 1950s. By then, the average value of each house was about $39,000 (equivalent to $473,000 in 2025), significantly lower than houses on Fifth Avenue, where some of the city's most expensive residences were located.

The properties on the western side of Henderson Place, along with the former Misericordia Hospital building adjacent to it, were sold in 1955 and replaced with a housing cooperative named Henderson House in 1961. The district was nominated as a city landmark district in 1966. It was designated by the New York City Landmarks Preservation Commission in 1969, becoming the 11th district designated by the agency. It was added to the National Register of Historic Places in 1974. In the 21st century, the Henderson Place houses remained intact, being Lamb and Rich's earliest surviving designs. By then, houses there often sold for millions of dollars.

== Reception ==
When the houses were built, the Real Estate Record and Guide criticized the cramped nature of the lots and regarded the "bright, varied and animated" design as contrived. Thomas W. Janes of The New York Times called Henderson Place among 86th Street's few "architecturally distinguished" enclaves, complementing the Mrs. Cornelius Vanderbilt Mansion on the opposite end of East 86th Street (at Fifth Avenue). Another Times writer compared Henderson Place to a mews (or row of horse stables), even though no horses ever lived on Henderson Place. The architectural historian Paul Goldberger wrote for the Times in 1980 that, while the remaining buildings "still hang together well", the presence of Henderson House endangered the integrity of the district. David Yeadon of The Washington Post wrote in 1992 that "the subtlety of the architects' intent is still evident" despite the missing houses, and Christopher Gray said in 2005 that the district's "dollhouse architecture" seemed incongruous with the surrounding high-rises. The New York Daily News wrote in 2012 that "gingerbread-type, three-story homes help make it as romantic and surprising a place for a New York City walk as any". The AIA Guide to New York City said the buildings created an atmosphere that "transported unwary romantics to other climes and another era".

== See also ==
- List of New York City Designated Landmarks in Manhattan from 59th to 110th Streets
- National Register of Historic Places listings in Manhattan from 59th to 110th Streets

== Sources ==
- National Register of Historic Places Inventory/Nomination: Henderson Place Historic District (PDF) (Report). National Park Service.
- Henderson Place Historic District (PDF) (Report). New York City Landmarks Preservation Commission. February 11, 1969.
