= 225 East 86th Street =

Residential building in Manhattan, New York

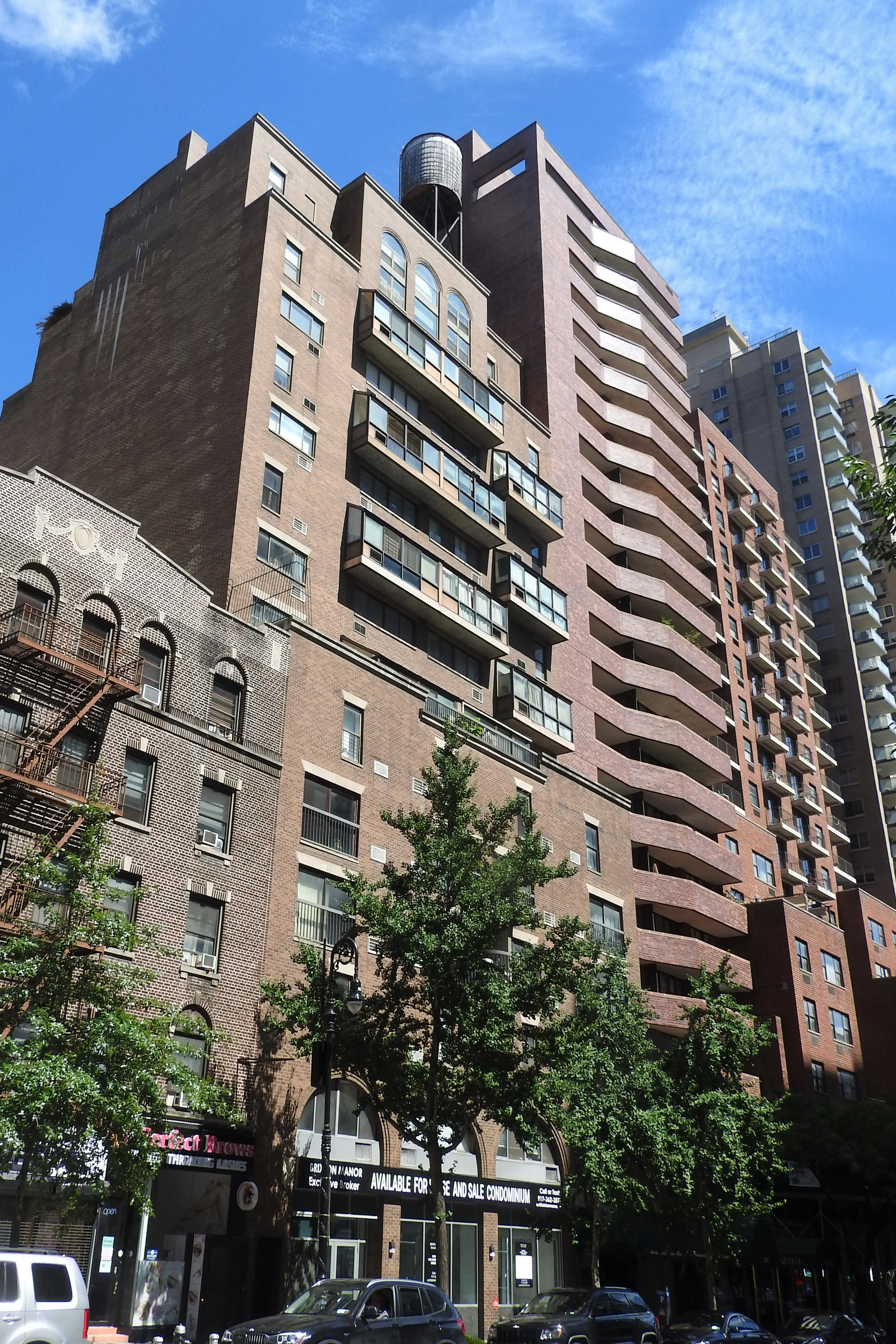
- Interactive map of the 225 East 86th Street area

General information
- Status: Completed
- Type: Condo
- Coordinates: 40°46′43.7″N 73°57′9.8″W
- Construction started: 1980
- Completed: 1982
- Opened: 1986

Technical details
- Floor count: 15

Design and construction
- Architect: Stephen B. Jacobs

225 East 86th Street is a luxury condominium on 86th Street between Second Avenue and Third Avenue in the Yorkville neighborhood of the Upper East Side of Manhattan, New York City. It is a 15-story building that was built in 1981 and converted to a condo in 1986. The building was quoted as being "Post-Baroque fun with windows" in the AIA Guide to New York City. The building is formally known as The Buckingham East.

The building has been featured in both the New York Post and the real estate blog 6sqft, the latter of which described one apartment as a "country cottage on the Upper East Side".

== History ==
225 East 86th Street is located on a stretch of the Upper East Side that used to be home to many dance halls and German beer emporiums. This building and the adjacent luxury cooperative building at 233 East 86th Street, which was erected in 1987, marked the beginning of a radical transformation of this area from a lively entertainment district and ethnic enclave to a high-rise luxury residential neighborhood.

225 East 86th Street was designed by Stephen B. Jacobs and Associates, and erected in 1982. The building was converted into a boutique 60-apartment condominium in 1986.

== Design ==
The building has a reddish beige-brick facade with large lunette windows on the second floor, and arched windows in the penthouse. According to Carter Hosley, "The façade of the base of the building is punctuated by two small, partitioned balconies and the setback tower portion of the building has several large protruding 'wintergardens' [glass-enclosed balconies]". Additionally, the building contains built in air-conditioners.

== Apartments ==
The building is primarily composed of large 1- and 2-bedroom triplex apartments. Many apartments contain winter-balconies, or solarium, and some apartments contain actual balconies. Apartment 1103, a 1 bedroom apartment, was featured in the blog 6sqft, which described it as a "condo [that] feels like a country cottage". Perched on top of the building are two adorned penthouses, the larger of which has a southern view of Manhattan's Billionaires' Row, has large arched windows, and dual terraces. The smaller penthouse contains a dual height living room, and a full-length terrace. One of the penthouses was featured in a New York Post article about the revitalization of Manhattan's Upper East Side.

== Amenities ==
The building has a full-time superintendent, lush furnished roof-top garden, and private storage facilities for all residents. The building contains has a canopied entrance that leads into the marble-clad lobby, with full time doorman.

== Location ==
The building is located between Second and Third Avenues on the north side of the street. There are two New York City Subway stations nearby, as well as numerous stores on the surrounding blocks.
