= Studebaker Building (Midtown Manhattan) =

Building in New York City (1902–2004)

Coordinates: 40°45′36.66″N 73°59′4.13″W

- Interactive map of the Studebaker Building area

General information
- Location: Manhattan, New York City
- Completed: 1902
- Demolished: 2004

Design and construction
- Architect: James Brown Lord

The Studebaker Building is a former structure at 1600 Broadway on the northeast corner at 48th Street in Manhattan, New York City. It was erected by the Juilliard Estate, in 1902, between Broadway and 7th Avenue, in the area north of Times Square. It was demolished in 2004 to make room for an apartment tower, a twenty- five story, 136 unit, luxury condominium designed by architect Einhorn Yaffee Prescott.

The Studebaker Building was ten stories high and occupied the entire block front between Broadway and 7th, facing Broadway for 113 feet (34 m). It was built from the Juilliard estate, "seeking a thoroughly safe income upon what was doubtless a very modest appraisal of the property's value." The structure covered the southern end of the block at Broadway and 49th Street. It was fireproof and fronted 48th Street for 104 feet (32 m).

== Architecture ==
The Studebaker Building was designed by James Brown Lord, who also designed Delmonico's Restaurant at 44th Street and Fifth Avenue (Manhattan). The exterior was composed of red brick and terra cotta with the employment of the anthemion motif in a repeated manner in the terra cotta as well as in the large projecting cornice at the roof level. Architecturally its floors were two 2 feet (0.61 m) higher than many lofts of the era. Another advantage proved to be the structure's abundant facilities for light.

In 1979 the edifice appeared on a list of more than two hundred recommended for landmark consideration by the staff of the Landmarks Preservation Commission. However the panel never acted on this. The 1979 report omitted the Studebaker identification and regarded the establishment as a standard office building. Its construction date was listed erroneously as 1912 and its design was falsely attributed as the work of a minor architectural firm.

In July 2000 the former Studebaker showroom was the Texas Texas restaurant. The building lost its cornice in 1988 but was still a fixture of Times Square. Its chamfered corners and broad arched windows were still evident to observers. The absence of its elaborate cornice hurt its chances of gaining official protection against demolition. Only three other Manhattan buildings which lacked cornices have received landmark designation. Robert Redlion, an engineer employed by the owner, submitted plans to repair ornamental cornice in October 1999. A 1987 facade inspection filed with New York City concluded the cornice was safe. Redlion and the owner contended that the ornamental molding was dangerous, with pieces having fallen on the ground. However no violations had been filed against the cornice.

== Ownership ==
The Studebaker Company obtained a 21-year lease on the property in 1903. for use as both a factory and office. It maintained offices and sales rooms on the first floor. A huge elevator moved cars between battery-charging rooms, storage areas, assemble finishing, and repair rooms on the other floors.

The corporation announced that it would remove its carriage and automobile business from the Studebaker Building in September 1910. The firm moved Uptown Manhattan to 57th Street and Broadway in 1911. One reason for leaving the area was its redevelopment as a locale in which theaters, restaurants, and hotels replaced older buildings.

They leased the building for a period of years to a single tenant, at first rumored to be Bustanoby Freres, which owned the Cafes des Beaux Arts at Sixth Avenue (Manhattan) and 40th Street. Under the new tenancy it was agreed that the building would be increased in height by the addition of three stories. It was resolved in December 1910 that the Bustanoby Brothers, Andre', Jacques, and Louis had acquired the Studebaker Building from the Crossett Realty Company, the Juilliard Estate, for a period of ninety-nine years. They took control of the real estate on January 1, 1911. They planned to make alterations to the structure according to plans drawn by Trowbridge and Livingston. Additions would conform to the original architecture of the edifice. The steel framework and floors would be retained with addition of two more floors. The roof would become a roof garden which was to be enclosed with glass in the winter. A hotel was proposed for a later date if the brothers succeeded in acquiring an additional plot of land. The hotel was envisioned to be two hundred rooms with a sizable restaurant on the main floor. Private dining rooms would reflect a modern, palatial style. It was to be named the Palais des Beaux Arts and have an opening date of October 1, 1911. It was estimated that the cost of building would run between $2,000,000 and $3,000,000. A 1933 New York Times article states that the Bustanoby brothers incorporated the Palace of Fine Arts with $1,500,000 capital in December 1910. This structure was to have replaced the Studebaker Building.

In April 1911 the Bustanobys transferred their lease of the property to a new syndicate for nine years for a price of $7,000,000. The buyers were led by Jesse Froelich, the United States representative of Benz & Cie. The building remained in the ownership of Mrs. A.D. Juillard. When Helen Cossitt Juilliard died in April 1916, her one third interest in the Studebaker Building, $263,777, was listed as part of her fortune which totaled $3,273,505.

The Bustanoby brothers retained the ground floor and basement for their restaurant, the Palais des Beaux Arts, planned to open in November 1911. The remaining ten stories were designated for commercial use which would be restricted to offices and non-manufacturing business. While the edifice was being renovated for the restaurant, its roof was leased by a breakfast food company for $25,000 a year, with the intention of placing an electric sign there. This was the highest price ever paid in New York City for sign privileges on the top of a building. The lease stipulated that the roof could be used for no other purpose.

When the Bustanobys gave up their idea to open a restaurant, an eatery in the Studebaker Building was opened by Henry D. Morton and John S. Keiser. The two men operated another restaurant in the Folies Bergere on 46th Street. The ground floor and basement was leased to Morton & Keiser by Mark Rafalsky & Co. for twenty-one years for a price in excess of $1,000,000. The restaurant was called the Folies after $200,000 was spent on alterations and decorations, following the design of Henry B. Herts of Herts & Tallant, architects. The upper floors continued to be modified for use by businesses.

John McGraw leased the second floor of the building in January 1912 to open a new billiard and pool room. His partner in this venture was Mike Donlin, an outfielder for the New York Giants baseball team.

A notable tenant was Fleischer Studios which was an animated cartoon studio run by brothers Max Fleischer and Dave Fleischer. They began occupying space in 1923. Best known for their cartoons starring Betty Boop and Popeye, they expanded to occupying four floors by 1938. Later that year, the studio moved to Miami, Florida. Another notable tenant was George Blake Enterprises, a commercial producer and documentary film maker, George Blake, 1917-1955.
