= Bus lanes in New York City =

Bus priority system

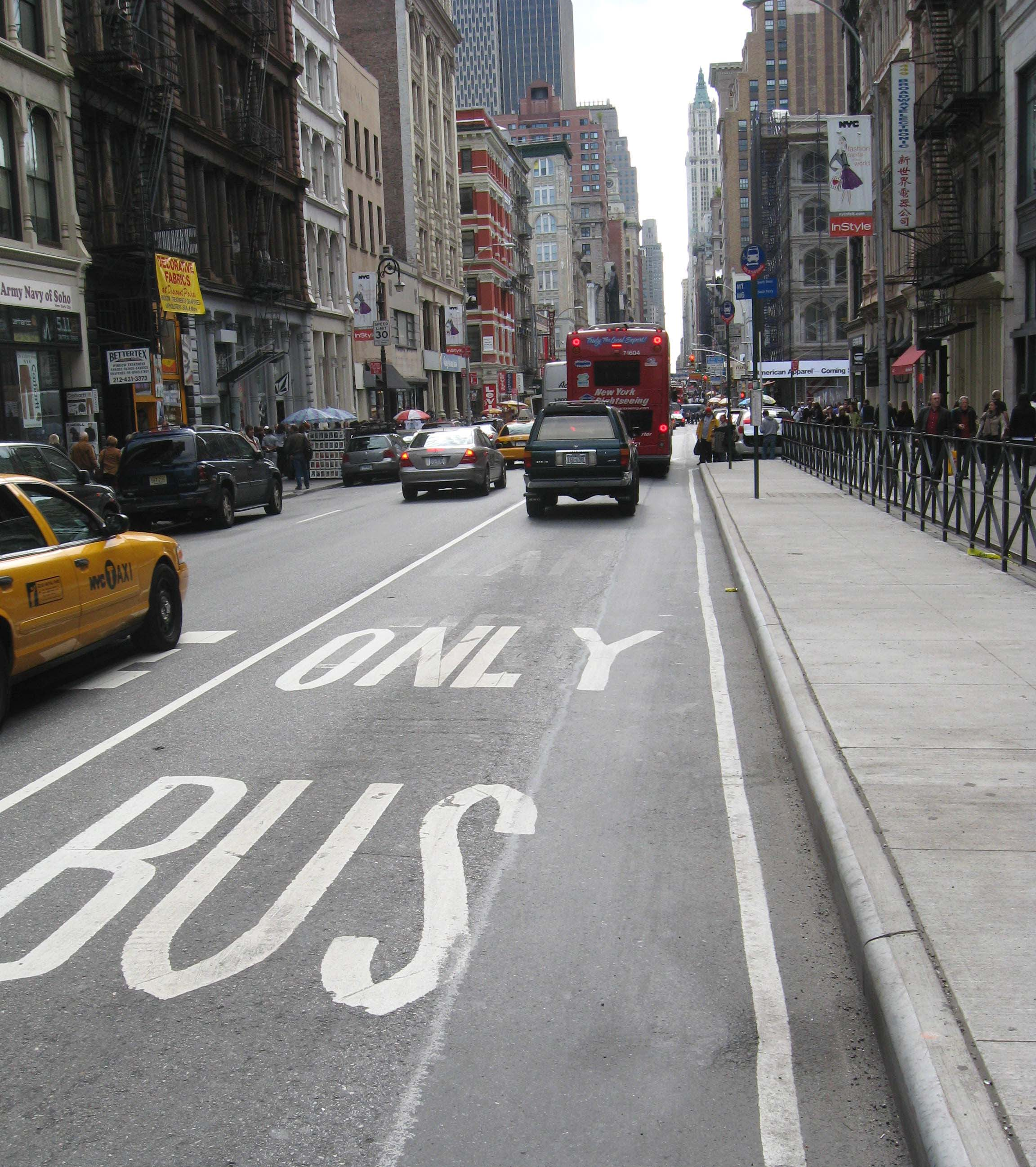
Bus lane on Broadway in Manhattan, painted with the words "BUS ONLY"

Since 1963, New York City has been using a system of bus lanes that are intended to give priority to buses, which contain more occupants than passenger and commercial vehicles. Most of these lanes are restricted to buses only at certain days and times, but some bus lanes are restricted 24/7. As of July 2026, there are 170 miles (270 km) of bus lanes within New York City (with an additional 23 miles of high occupancy vehicle lanes on highways which also accommodate buses).

The lanes are generally used to speed up MTA bus routes on the city's public transport system, which would be otherwise held up by traffic congestion. Bus lanes are a key component of the Select Bus Service (SBS) bus rapid transit network, improving bus travel speeds and reliability by reducing delays caused by other traffic.

Since implementation, the lanes have generally helped to increase bus reliability citywide. However, there have been controversies on the benefits of the bus lanes due to the resulting increased traffic and the methods used to enforce bus lanes during their operating hours. In 2010 the city began enforcing the rule by placing cameras that take photos and videos of violators, leading to increased reports of bus-lane violations.

== Types of bus lanes ==
A curbside bus lane runs along the curb. Vehicles are not allowed to park or stand in this lane, but may briefly enter this lane to make right turns unless otherwise specified.

An offset bus lane is placed one lane away from the curb. In this setup, vehicles are able to park or stand at the curb, but are not allowed to double park or stop on the bus lane. Vehicles may briefly enter this lane to make right turns unless otherwise specified.

There are also median bus lanes, which are placed in the center of the road. This setup is used along East 161st Street in the Bronx, used by the Bx6 and Bx6 Select Bus Service routes, Woodhaven Blvd in Queens, Kings Highway in Brooklyn and EL Grant Highway in the Bronx.

A busway typically allows buses and trucks to travel along the corridor, while also permitting local access via side streets for all other vehicles. Traffic regulations on busways vary. This type of busway began with the 14th Street Busway, originally only a temporary measure when the L train was shut down in 2019. Additional busways have been installed, beginning with Jay Street in Brooklyn, Main Street in Flushing, Jamaica Avenue in Jamaica, and 181st Street in Manhattan.

== History ==
=== 20th century ===
As early as 1959, the city wished to build exclusive bus lanes on Lafayette and DeKalb Avenues in Brooklyn. The lanes would be built on streets that were to be converted from two-way to one-way streets. They were intended to increase the speed of bus service on these avenues, since without the bus lanes, the routes were projected to lose riders. However, traffic commissioner T. T. Wiley disapproved of the proposal, since the city did not install exclusive bus lanes.

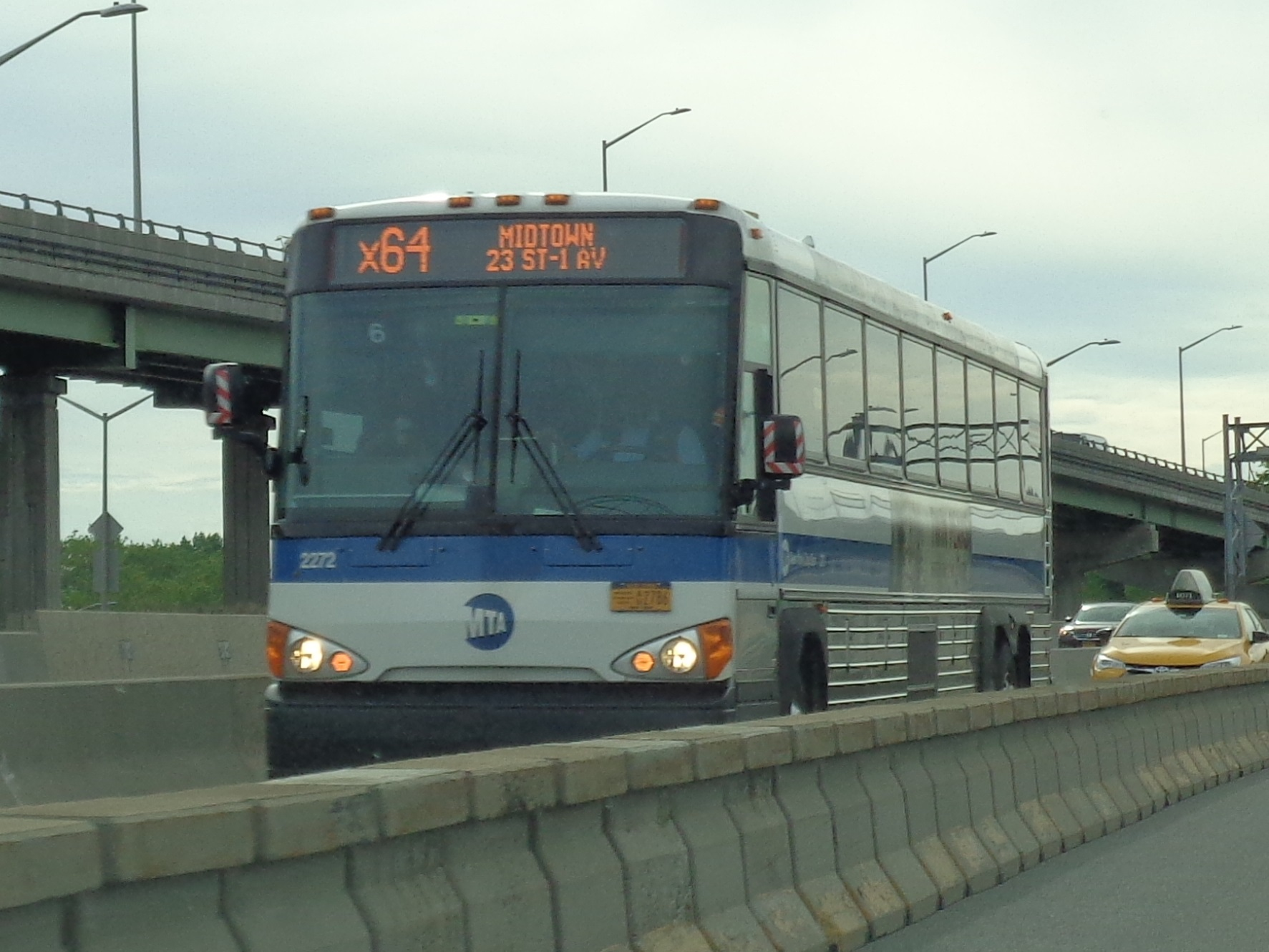
The combined bus and HOV lane on the Long Island Expressway near the Brooklyn–Queens Expressway

The first two bus-lane corridors implemented in New York City were installed on May 20, 1963. One set of bus lanes was placed on Victory Boulevard in Staten Island, at the approach to the Saint George Ferry Terminal. The other set was placed on Livingston Street in Downtown Brooklyn between Boerum Street and Flatbush Avenue. The same year, the city's first highway bus lane was installed on the Long Island Expressway in Long Island City, under the proposal of Traffic Commissioner Henry A. Barnes. The Brooklyn bus lane soon encountered frequent traffic slowdowns, leading officials to propose adding no-parking signs and more traffic agents to enforce the lane. Another bus lane was soon installed along Hillside Avenue in Queens, with the westbound bus lane extending to the subway station at 169th Street. In 1969, one of the most congested corridors, 42nd Street between Third Avenue and Eighth Avenue, received a rush-hour-only bus lane.

Crosstown bus service on 49th and 50th Streets in Manhattan had one of the slowest speeds of those on any crosstown street in Manhattan: 3 miles per hour (4.8 km/h) (walking speed). As a result, on June 12, 1979, to speed travel, lanes were implemented to be dedicated for use by crosstown buses and taxis. Cars without a destination on this pair of streets were prohibited on weekdays from 11 a.m. to 4 p.m. between Third Avenue and Seventh Avenue. A seven-minute reduction in travel time resulted from the change.

On May 26, 1981, the New York City Department of Transportation (NYCDOT) implemented Commissioner Sam Schwartz's plan for bus lanes on Madison Avenue. These were the first exclusive concurrent dual bus lanes on a city street. Two lanes along Madison between 42nd Street and 59th Street were reserved for buses between 2 p.m. and 7 p.m on weekdays in order to reduce congestion and increase mass transit usage. Twenty-nine traffic enforcement agents monitored the operation. This plan was one of three major transportation initiatives undertaken by the Koch Administration. The plan was put into place after the city took a study of traffic going down Madison Avenue: 24,000 people were moved by bus, while only 11,000 moved by car between 2 p.m. and 7 p.m.. The maximum time to ride on a bus along the corridor was decreased from 36 minutes to 15 minutes. The Federal Urban Mass Transit Administration (now the Federal Transit Administration) provided a grant of $788,000 for the project. While intended to only last for a year, the plan was so successful that the bus lanes were maintained. Local bus speeds increased from 2.9 miles per hour (4.7 km/h) to 4.8 miles per hour (7.7 km/h), a 65% increase. Express bus speeds increased from 2.9 miles per hour (4.7 km/h) to 5.8 miles per hour (9.3 km/h), a 100% increase. While it was expected to decrease speeds for private cars and taxis, the overall speed of traffic on the remainder of the avenue increased by 10%.

Additional bus lanes were added in the 1970s and 1980s. By 1981, Manhattan alone had 12 miles (19 km) of priority bus lanes along First, Second, Third, Sixth, and Eighth Avenues; Broadway in Lower Manhattan; and 42nd and 57th Streets. Another federal grant of $575,000 allowed the city to hire 22 traffic agents to enforce bus lane rules. In 1982, the city started a pilot project in which it installed red thermoplastic strips along 10 bus lanes in Manhattan. The strips were installed to remind motorists of heavy bus-lane penalties. In 1982, a curbside bus lane was implemented on Third Avenue between 36th Street and 56th Street.

=== 21st century ===
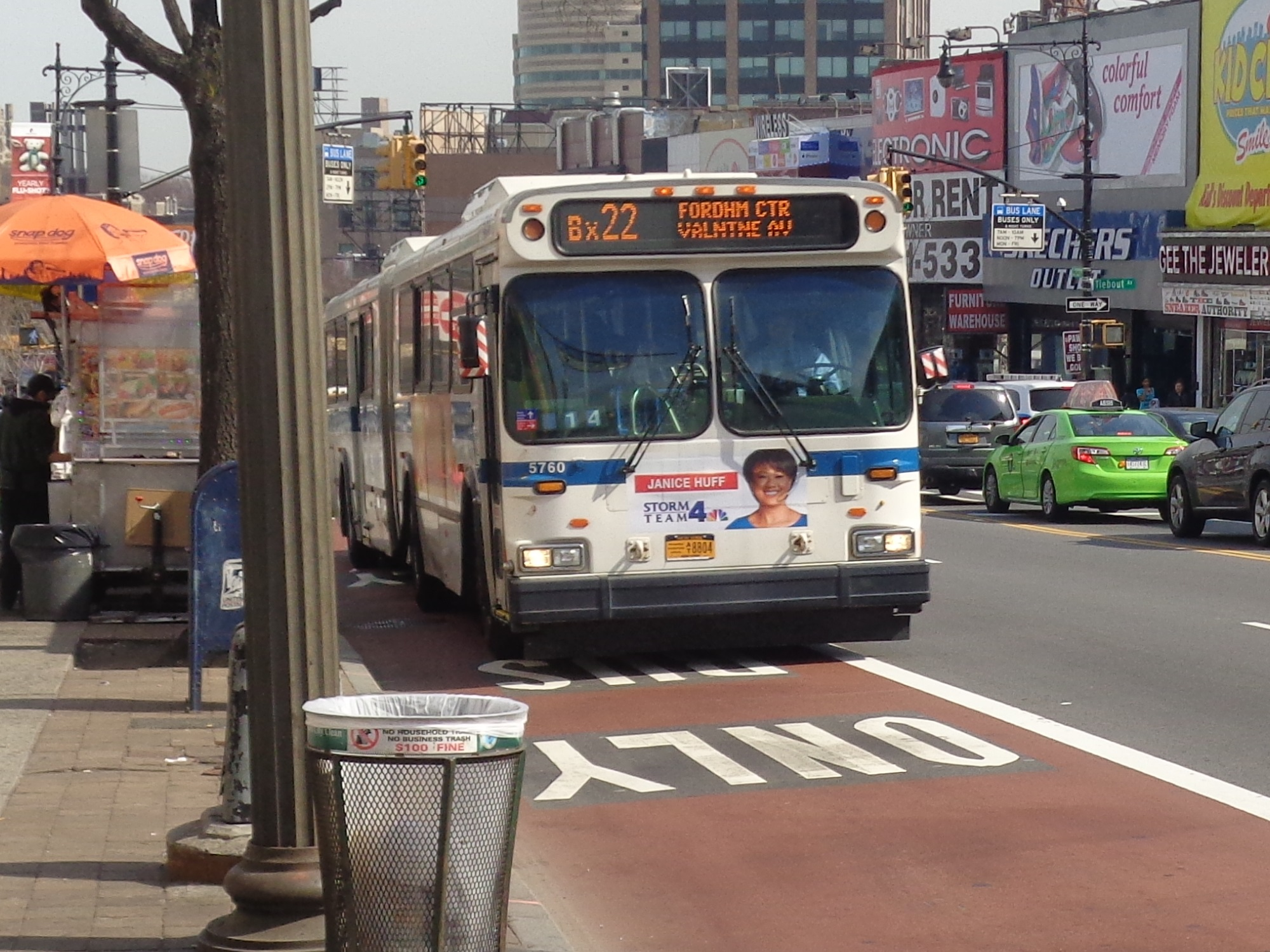
Curbside bus lanes on Fordham Road in the Bronx

The NYCDOT started painting bus lanes red in 2007–2008, with the introduction of Select Bus Service (SBS). The first bus lane that was painted red was installed on 57th Street in 2007, but the red paint was removed two years later. The NYCDOT chose an epoxy-based red paint for visibility reasons, but after extensive testing and review of said paint, found that the red paint was only durable when applied on newer asphalt surfaces. In 2010, the NYCDOT began studying other epoxy-based red paints for use on bus lanes. As a result of the study, three brands of red paint were determined to be suitable for use on New York City bus lanes. In 2017, the Bx6 became the first corridor to use bus lanes in the median of the street, as opposed to bus lanes on the curbside or one lane away from the curbside. The median bus lanes supposedly speed up traffic by going around double-parked cars.

In January 2019, mayor Bill de Blasio promised to add 14 to 15 miles (23 to 24 km) of bus lanes a year as part of a plan to speed up the city's bus system. On April 18, 2019, de Blasio unveiled the Better Buses Action Plan, which recommended 24 locations where changes to speed up bus service should be made. As part of the plan, twenty-four corridors would receive new, upgraded, or protected bus lanes, in addition to other strategic measures intended to speed up bus service. In addition to new bus lanes on fourteen corridors and bus stop improvements to six locations, bus lanes will be upgraded along four corridors. These are Lexington Avenue between 96th and 60th Streets, Madison Avenue between 60th and 42nd Streets, and 42nd Street between FDR Drive and 12th Avenue in Manhattan, as well as Livingston Street between Boerum Place and Flatbush Avenue (potentially protected bus lanes) in Brooklyn. In October 2019, the New York City Council passed legislation mandating that 150 miles (240 km) of bus lanes be added in the city within five years.

A busway on 14th Street was implemented in October 2019 on a trial basis. In June 2020, de Blasio announced that the city would test out busways on Main Street and Jamaica Avenue in Queens, 5th Avenue and 181st Street in Manhattan, and Jay Street in Brooklyn. The 14th Street busway would become permanent, and 16.5 miles (26.6 km) of new bus lanes would be added. While the Jay Street busway was implemented in September 2020, none of the other projects were completed by that October, which had been the deadline set by de Blasio. The third busway to open was the Main Street corridor in Downtown Flushing, which had its southbound lanes converted in 2017 and its northbound lanes in January 2021.

In Eric Adams's successful campaign for the 2021 New York City mayoral election, he promised to add 150 miles (240 km) of bus lanes in New York City in four years. This was in accordance with the City Council's 2019 legislation that mandated 150 miles of bus lanes by 2024. The city added only 10 miles (16 km) of bus lanes in 2022, Adams's first full year in office, due to various objections from politicians and community groups who did not want bus lanes in their neighborhoods. By mid-2024, The New York Times estimated that fewer than 30 miles (48 km) of additional bus lanes would have been added in Adams's first three years.

In July 2026, mayor Zohran Mamdani released the report Next Stop: Fast Buses, Better Service alongside NYCDOT. As part of the plan, 50 corridors were listed as priority corridors for bus infrastructure improvements, which were based on where bus riders experiences the most delays on their journey and considered bus speeds, ridership, reliability, time for journeys and access to other transit modes, with five of them selected to become rapid bus corridors.

== Notable corridors with bus lanes ==
As of July 2026, the city's bus lane network is about 170 miles (270 km) long, representing three percent of the city's 6,000 miles (9,700 km) of streets.

=== Manhattan ===
==== North–south corridors ====
For nearly their entire lengths, the northbound-only First Avenue between Houston and 125th Streets, and southbound-only Second Avenue between 125th and Houston Streets, form a directional pair of bus lanes used by the M15 corridor. The bus lanes are used by both the M15 local and SBS routes. Northbound-only Third Avenue between 36th and 123rd Streets, and southbound-only Lexington Avenue (southbound, between 30th and 96th Streets), is another directional pair hosting the M101, M102, M103, and M98 bus routes.

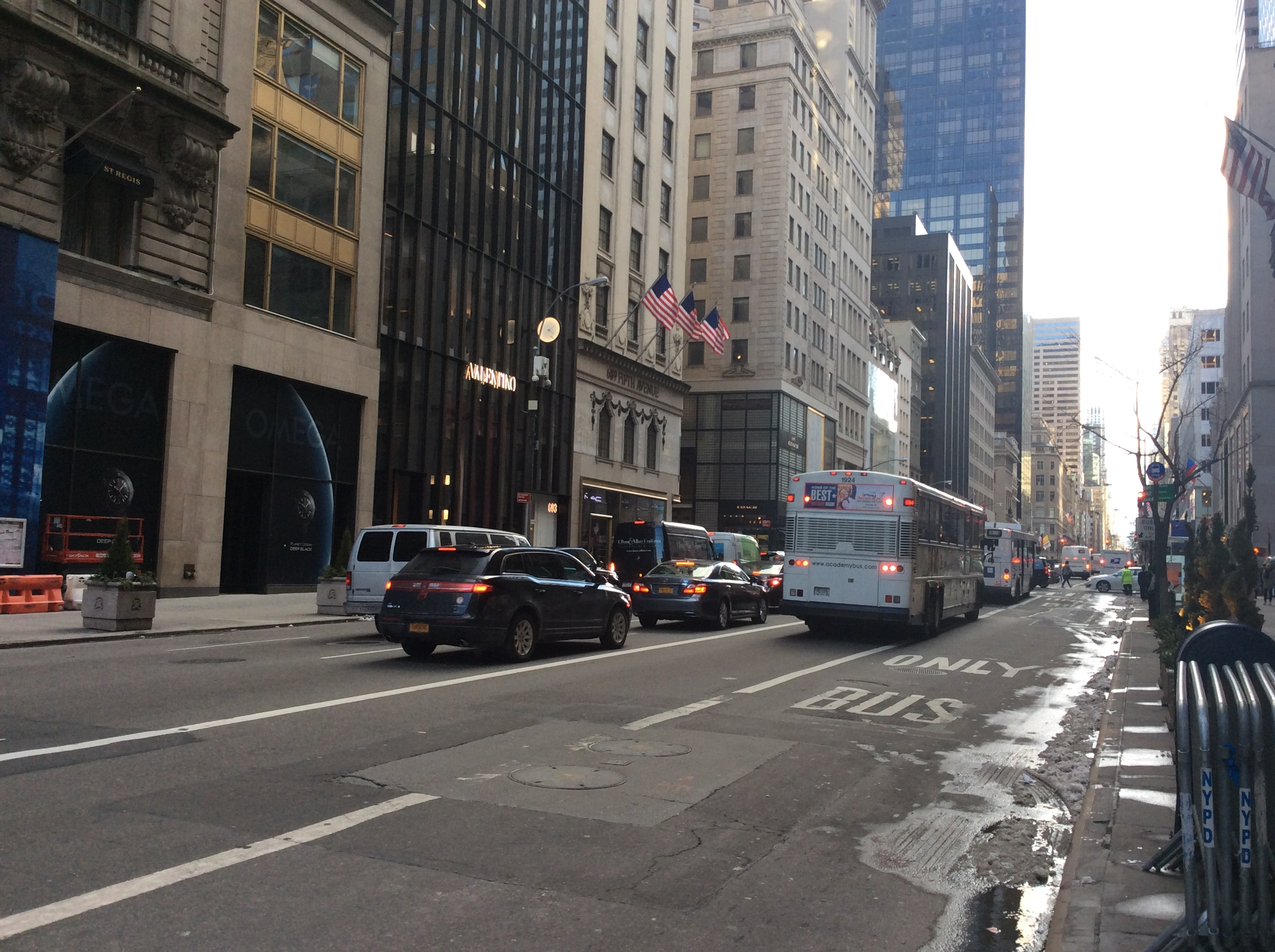
A curbside bus lane on Fifth Avenue

The two bus lanes of southbound-only Fifth Avenue carry the M1, M2, M3, M4, and M5. In fall 2017, a second bus lane was added to Fifth Avenue. They form a directional pair with the two northbound-only Madison Avenue bus lanes between 42nd and 59th Streets, which carry the M1, M2, M3, and M4. In November 2012, the hours of the double bus lanes on Madison Avenue were extended from 2 to 7 p.m. to 24 hours. The bus lanes were extended south to 23rd Street in 2026.

Northbound Sixth Avenue between 40th and 57th Streets, carrying the M5 and M7, is a directional pair with southbound Seventh Avenue, whose bus lane between 23rd and 42nd Streets) is used by the M7 and M20. In June 2026, the NYCDOT announced plans to extend the Sixth Avenue bus lane south to Watts Street and north to 58th Street. For the M20, Seventh Avenue is also a directional pair with northbound Eighth Avenue between 42nd and 57th Streets.

In Lower Manhattan, there is one directional pair of bus lanes. Southbound Broadway contains a bus lane between Bowling Green and Houston Street, which carries the M55 and Staten Island express routes. Northbound Church Street, between Battery Place and Warren Street, carries these same routes one block west of Broadway. Other Lower Manhattan corridors where bus lanes have been installed or planned are the FDR Drive between the Brooklyn Bridge and Battery Park, for express buses; Allen Street between Houston Street and Grand Street, for the M15 and M15 SBS; and Battery Place between Broadway and West Street, for express buses.

==== West–east corridors ====
Bus lanes also exist on major crosstown streets in Midtown Manhattan. A bidirectional, restricted-access busway carrying the M14 SBS is located on the 14th Street corridor between Third and Ninth Avenues. Additional bus lanes on 14th Street would be added between Avenue C and First Avenue. The bidirectional bus lanes on 23rd Street, carrying the M23 SBS and various express routes, stretch across almost the entire length of the street, with the westbound lane running between 1st and 8th Avenues and the eastbound lane between 10th and 2nd Avenues. On 34th Street, both lanes run between 11th and 1st Avenues, serving the M34 and M34A SBS buses as well as westbound express routes. There are plans to upgrade the bus lanes between Third Avenue and Ninth Avenue to a full busway. Eight blocks north, 42nd Street's lanes between 11th and 1st Avenues carry mainly the M42, though there are also some left-turn bus lanes on 42nd Street. 57th Street's bus lanes between 8th and 2nd Avenues are used by the M31, M57, and various eastbound express routes.

Uptown, the M79 SBS corridor employs short segments of "queue jump" bus lanes on parts of 79th and 81st Streets in order to enable buses to jump to the front of traffic at several signalized intersections. 86th Street also uses queue-jump lanes for the M86 SBS corridor. In Harlem and East Harlem, 125th Street's crosstown bus lanes between Morningside and 2nd Avenues carries the M60 SBS, M101, and M125 routes at various points. In Washington Heights, 181st Street has bus lanes between Broadway and 9th Avenue to funnel Bronx bus routes into the George Washington Bridge Bus Station. The 181st Street lanes carry the Bx3, Bx11, Bx13, Bx35, and Bx36 routes. In Inwood, the 207th Street lanes between Broadway and Amsterdam Avenue carry the Bx12 and Bx12 SBS routes. Bus lanes on 96th Street between Second Avenue and West End Avenue carry the M96 and M106 buses. Bus lanes are proposed on 116th Street between Pleasant Avenue and Manhattan Avenue.

==== Short corridors ====
There are short bus lanes for various destinations around Manhattan. The southbound bus lane on 11th Avenue between 37th and 42nd Streets serves buses entering the Jacob K. Javits Convention Center, as well as the M12 route. Bus lanes also exist at several major crossings, including 60th Street (for the Queensboro Bridge) and the Holland Tunnel.

There are two non-MTA bus lanes in Manhattan. One of them is the Holland Tunnel lane, which is used only by buses traveling to and from New Jersey. No MTA buses traveling through New Jersey use the Holland Tunnel. The other is in northern Harlem, along Convent Avenue between 135th and 145th Streets carry school buses, which headed for the City College of New York. No MTA buses use these lanes since the discontinuation of the M18 bus in 2010 eliminated MTA bus service on Convent Avenue.

=== The Bronx ===
==== Major corridors ====
The Bronx has several major sets of bus lanes, including four crosstown corridors. The crosstown lanes on Fordham Road and Pelham Parkway, between Sedgwick Avenue and Stillwell Avenue, are used by the Bx12 and Bx12 SBS. There is also a bus lane corridor on East 161st Street used by the Bx6 and Bx6 SBS, consisting of two main parts: an eastbound-only lane in the center roadway and tunnel from Yankee Stadium to Sheridan Avenue, and a center bus lane from Sheridan to Morris Avenues. Another major crosstown corridor with bus lanes is 149th Street between River Avenue and Southern Boulevard, used by the Bx19. In 2026, the city government built a west–east busway on Tremont Avenue between Third Avenue and Southern Boulevard.

The north–south Webster Avenue lanes between 166th Street and Gun Hill Road (with a gap between 176th Street and East Tremont Avenue), which serve the Bx41 and Bx41 SBS routes. A median busway has also been installed on the north–south Edward L. Grant Highway for the Bx11 and Bx35; it was completed in 2020. There are also bus lanes on Gun Hill Road serving the Bx28 and Bx38 bus routes between Bainbridge Avenue and Bartow Avenue. University Avenue between Washington Bridge and Kingsbridge Road (used by the Bx3 and Bx36) also has bus lanes. Bus lanes are also planned to be installed on the Grand Concourse between 138th Street and 163rd Street, with plans for the rest of the corridor scheduled to proceed later.

==== Short corridors ====
Smaller bus lane corridors exist. There are bus lanes on East 163rd Street from Tiffany Street to Southern Boulevard and East 161st Street from Melrose Avenue to Third Avenue. A southbound left turn queue jump for the Bx5 is located at the intersection of Southern Boulevard and East 163rd Street.

Planned bus lanes include queue jumps and curbside bus lanes for the Bx35 along 168th and 169th Streets, queue jumps along Tremont Ave between Morris Avenue and Webster Avenue, and bus lanes on Washington Bridge. There are also bus lanes on Story Avenue and White Plains Road for the Bx5, Bx36, and Bx39, as well as a contra-flow bus lane at Pelham Bay Park for the Bx12 SBS. There is also a planned busway along Tremont Avenue between Third Avenue and Southern Boulevard for the Bx36.

=== Queens ===
==== Major corridors ====
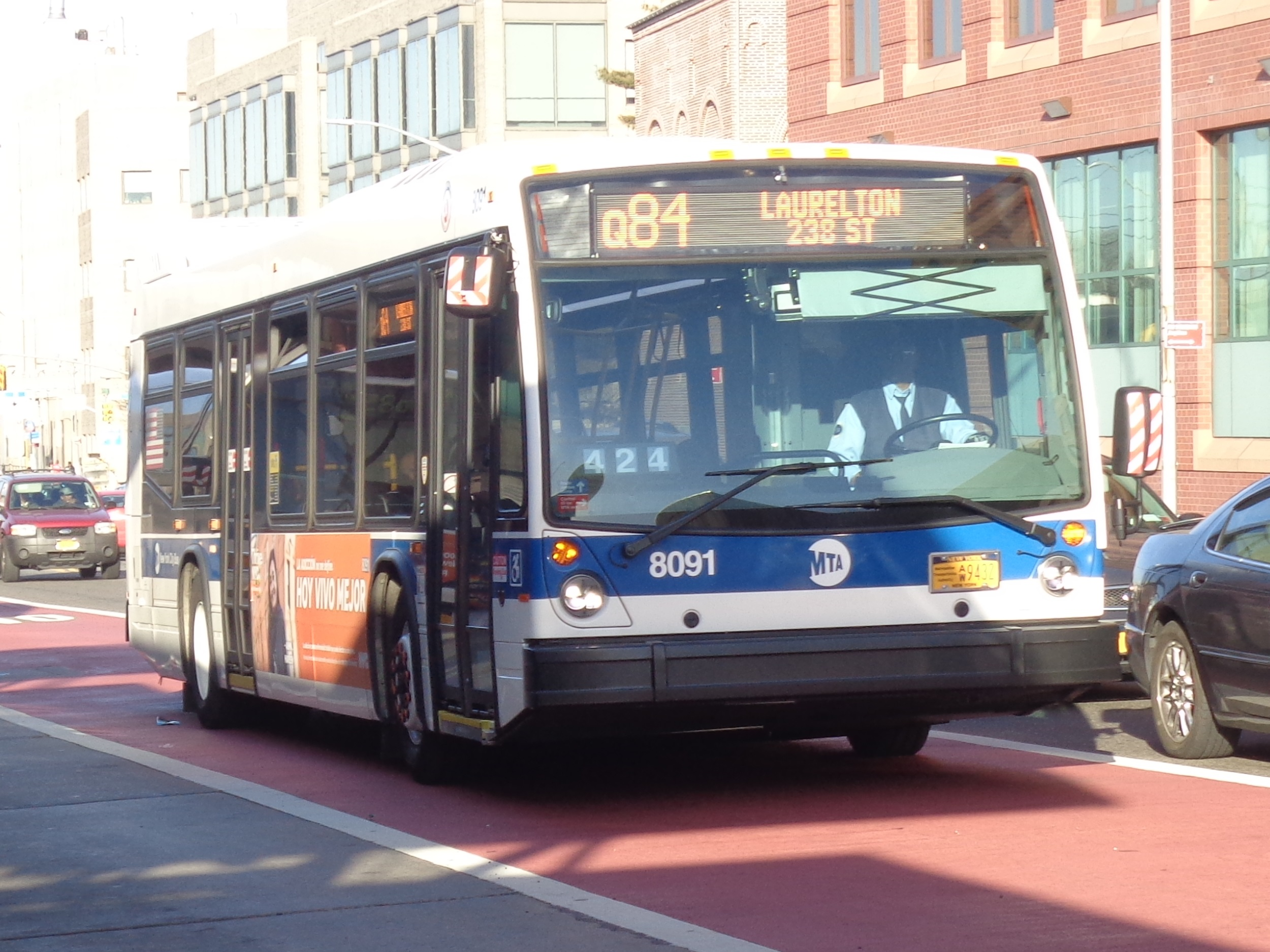
A Q84 bus using an offset bus lane in Jamaica, Queens

In Jamaica, Archer Avenue between Sutphin and Merrick Boulevards carries routes leading to Jamaica Center or 165th Street Bus Terminal. The vast majority of routes run eastbound along Archer Avenue, but bus lanes run in both directions along the avenue. One block north, Jamaica Avenue's lanes between Sutphin Boulevard and 168th Street carry bidirectional bus traffic, but about half of routes use only the westbound bus lane. A longer set of bus lanes in northern Jamaica, on Hillside Avenue between 139th Street and Francis Lewis Boulevard, carry the Q1, Q36, Q43, Q44 SBS and Q82. These bus lanes were extended further east to Springfield Boulevard in October 2025. Merrick Boulevard also has bus lanes from Hillside Avenue to Springfield Boulevard, which carry the Q4, Q5, Q84, Q85, Q86, Q87, Q89, n4 and n4X buses.

North–south lanes in Queens run along Main Street between Northern Boulevard and Horace Harding Expressway, hosting the Q20 and Q44 SBS as well as numerous routes terminating or passing through Downtown Flushing. Within Downtown Flushing, southbound traffic on Main Street between 37th Avenue and 40th Road is restricted to buses and local deliveries. A similar restriction exists on the northbound lanes from Sanford Avenue to Northern Boulevard. A northbound bus lane was planned between the Grand Central Parkway and Union Turnpike.

Further to the west, the north–south Woodhaven Boulevard corridor, carrying the Q11, Q52 SBS, and Q53 SBS, contains bus lanes between Queens Boulevard and Metropolitan Avenue, as well as between Union Turnpike and North Conduit Ave. Future projects will upgrade the bus lanes on Main Street and Woodhaven Boulevard. In Astoria, there are bus lanes on 21st Street for the B62, Q66, Q69, and Q100 between Queens Plaza and Hoyt Avenue North, which were completed in 2022.

There is a southbound bus lane on Fresh Pond Road between Metropolitan and Putnam Avenues. The corridor carries the Q58, Q98, and three express bus routes and is also used by buses deadheading to Fresh Pond Depot. The Ridgewood Busway, a bus-only road under the BMT Myrtle Avenue Line that would also carry the Q58 and Q98 routes, was announced in 2025 with an estimated cost of $30 million.

==== Short corridors ====
Several short east–west bus lanes were installed in Queens as well. In March 2018, the NYCDOT announced that a short bus lane for the Q60 would be installed as part of the capital reconstruction of Queens Boulevard for Vision Zero's Great Streets program. As part of the plan, the Q60 would be moved to the median of Queens Boulevard between Roosevelt Avenue and 73rd Street, and a bus lane would be located in the median at 69th Street heading eastbound. In addition, bus-only queue-jump bus stops with boarding islands would be added at 65th Place.

In April 2019, the NYCDOT announced that eight queue-jump lanes would be added along Broadway: at Grand Avenue, Whitney Avenue and 78th Street in both directions, and at 75th Street northbound and Corona Avenue southbound. These lanes would speed up bus service on the Q53 SBS and Q58. In May 2026, an eastbound center-running bus lane was installed along Broadway between the Brooklyn-Queens Expressway and Roosevelt Avenue before the 2026 World Cup.

A third corridor, Rockaway Beach Boulevard from Beach 116th to Beach 73rd Street, carrying the Q22 and Q52/Q53 SBS, also received bus lanes on parts of the corridor.

==== Express lane ====
Queens also has one combined bus/HOV lane in the Manhattan-bound direction. during morning rush hours only. The lane exists on the Long Island Expressway west of Calvary Cemetery. The bus lane extends to the Manhattan portal of the Queens–Midtown Tunnel. It serves most Queens-to-Manhattan express buses.

=== Brooklyn ===
==== Major corridors ====
In Downtown Brooklyn, there are two major corridors with bus lanes. Fulton Mall and Fulton Street contain a bus lane in each direction between Boerum Place and South Oxford Street, with buses having exclusive use of the Fulton Mall west of the Flatbush Avenue Extension. The Fulton corridor is used by the B25, B26, B38, and B52. One block south of Fulton are the Livingston Street bus lanes, which run between Boerum Place and Flatbush Avenue. These are served by the B41, B45, B67, and B103. There is also a busway on Jay Street, served by the B26, B54, B57, B62 and B67.

Offset bus lane on Nostrand Avenue in Brooklyn

Southbound Nostrand Avenue contains one bus lane between Flushing Avenue and Flatbush Avenue, carrying B44 and B44 SBS. Rogers Avenue between Flatbush and Flushing Avenues was also retrofitted with a northbound bus lane, serving the B44 SBS and B49 in that direction. Bus lanes were also installed on the extreme south end of Nostrand Avenue between Avenue X and Emmons Avenue.

The Utica Avenue corridor had bus lanes between Carroll Street and Eastern Parkway prior to the implementation of Select Bus Service on the B46 in 2016. The avenue also gained lanes from St. Johns Place and Church Avenue in 2014, which were extended to Fillmore Avenue in 2015.

In 2018, as part of the implementation of B82 Limited route to Select Bus Service, a section of Kings Highway between East 23rd Street and Avenue K was equipped with two bus lanes. Bus lanes are planned on Bay Parkway and Cropsey Avenue as a continuous corridor between Avenue J and 26th Avenue, used by the B6, B82, B82-SBS, X28, and X38 buses. In June 2026, the NYCDOT announced plans for 2.4 miles (3.9 km) of offset bus lanes on the Bay Parkway–Cropsey Avenue corridor.

A 7-mile (11 km) bus lane corridor on Flatbush Avenue, for the B41 route, was proposed in 2022, with dedicated bus lanes. The NYCDOT announced in 2025 that center-running bus lanes, with pedestrian islands, would be built on the avenue from Livingston Street to Grand Army Plaza; the lanes were finished in late 2026. Another corridor on Lafayette and DeKalb Avenues, serving the B38, was announced in late 2026.

==== Short corridors ====
The borough also has shorter bus lanes to facilitate operations at key destinations. On eastbound Oriental Boulevard between Jaffrey and Norfolk Streets in Sheepshead Bay, a bus lane for Kingsborough Community College serves the B1 and B49 routes. In Canarsie, Rockaway Parkway has a bus lane between Glenwood Road and Flatlands Avenue for B42 buses making connections with the Canarsie-Rockaway Parkway subway station. In Prospect Heights, Flatbush Avenue has bus lanes at Grand Army Plaza, which host the B41 service.

Other bus lanes are installed on short, heavily traveled corridors. In 2017, the NYCDOT announced revised plans to implement bus lanes between Fort Greene Place and Grand Avenue on Fulton Street to speed up B25 and B26 service, with the bus lanes being in effect for fewer hours per day than originally planned. In March 2018, the NYCDOT announced plans to install a bus lane between Avenue S and East 53rd Street on the northbound Flatbush Avenue service road, as well as a leading bus interval at the traffic light at the intersection with Utica Avenue. In April 2019, the NYCDOT announced that it planned to install east–west bus lanes on Church Avenue between Flatbush Avenue and East 7th Street to facilitate B35, B103, BM3, and BM4 service. In addition, two northbound queue jumps and a short southbound bus lane would be installed on Utica Avenue between Chauncey Street and Atlantic Avenue for B46 SBS service. There is also a short southbound bus lane planned to be installed on Marcy Avenue between Borinquen Place and Broadway. In April 2026, plans were announced to install bus lanes in the median of Linden Boulevard between Fountain Avenue and Conduit Avenue, with work expected to be finished by summer 2027.

==== Express lane ====
Brooklyn also has one combined bus/HOV lane, which runs in the Manhattan-bound direction during morning rush hours and the Staten Island-bound direction during evening rush hours. The lane exists on the Gowanus Expressway north of the Verrazzano–Narrows Bridge. The bus lane extends to the Manhattan portal of the Brooklyn–Battery Tunnel. It serves most Staten Island-to-Manhattan express buses.

=== Staten Island ===
==== Major corridors ====
Staten Island has four major bus lane corridors. Hylan Boulevard's bus lanes host the S78, S79 SBS, and numerous express routes between Steuben Street and Nelson Avenue. South of Hylan Boulevard, Father Capodanno Boulevard also has a bus lane in the northbound direction between Midland and Lily Pond Avenues, which are used by the S51, S52, S81, and some express routes. Richmond Avenue's north–south lanes appear in two places: near the Staten Island Mall and near Hylan Boulevard. They are mainly utilized by the S59, S79 SBS, and S89, as well as some express routes. Finally, Victory Boulevard has bus lanes between Forest Avenue and Bay Street, which are used by the S46, S48, S61, S62, S66, S91, S92, S96, and S98.

==== Express lane ====
Staten Island also has a combined bus/HOV lane on the Staten Island Expressway in each direction from Victory Boulevard to the Verrazzano–Narrows Bridge. It serves most Staten Island-to-Manhattan express buses.

== Rules ==
Emergency vehicles and buses, including non-MTA buses such as school buses and charter buses, are the only vehicles with unrestricted access to the bus lane during the hours that the bus lane is in effect. During that time, it is permitted to enter a bus lane and drive for a maximum of 200 feet (61 m) in order to make an immediate right turn, or to enter a driveway. It is also permitted to be in the bus lane to actively engage in curbside parking. Finally, delivery trucks can enter bus lanes to make drop-offs or pick-ups at residences or businesses, but only when bus lanes are not in effect.

=== Enforcement ===
In 2010, the city gained authorization from the state to begin placing hidden traffic cameras on gantries above the bus lanes. The cameras take photos of the vehicles driving through the bus lane, along with their license plates. Originally, a fine of $115 to $150 was then mailed to the registrant's address. The New York City Police Department (NYPD) also enforces the bus lanes by issuing parking and moving violations to violators. In 2014, according to the Independent Budget Office, 3/4 of bus lane violations were captured on camera, contributing to $41 million worth of traffic violations captured by traffic cameras in that year.

Some buses are equipped with on-board cameras, which ticket drivers who are using bus lanes illegally. Traffic cameras were mounted onto S79 buses in late 2022 as part of a pilot program. By the end of that year, there were 300 buses in the MTA's fleet with on-board traffic cameras. As of 2023, nineteen routes were using on-board traffic cameras. In August 2024, the MTA began using the on-board cameras to fine drivers who were caught blocking bus lanes or bus stops; the cameras were added to 20 more routes that September. Motorists are ticketed only if two separate buses' cameras detect their vehicle in the same location within a given time period.

Automated cameras rarely make errors, are not disputable, and add revenue to the city without the cost of human officers. However, there were cases where the cameras were perceived to be used as traps and the legitimacy was disputed. Another disadvantage was that some drivers received violations for momentarily entering the bus lane to avoid a collision, or taking too long to exit the bus lane as a result of traffic jams. Enforcement was also criticized as lax. As a result, in January 2019, a dedicated enforcement team of tow trucks was announced. That same October, the MTA introduced a "graduated fine" system wherein a first offense would result in a $50 fine, but subsequent violations would receive increasing fines not exceeding $250. The New York City Police Department launched a task force in December 2023 to ticket and tow vehicles that block bus lanes. The on-board bus cameras are also prone to errors; for example, there were complaints that the cameras were ticketing drivers who double-parked outside bus lanes and drivers who were parked legally next to bus lanes.

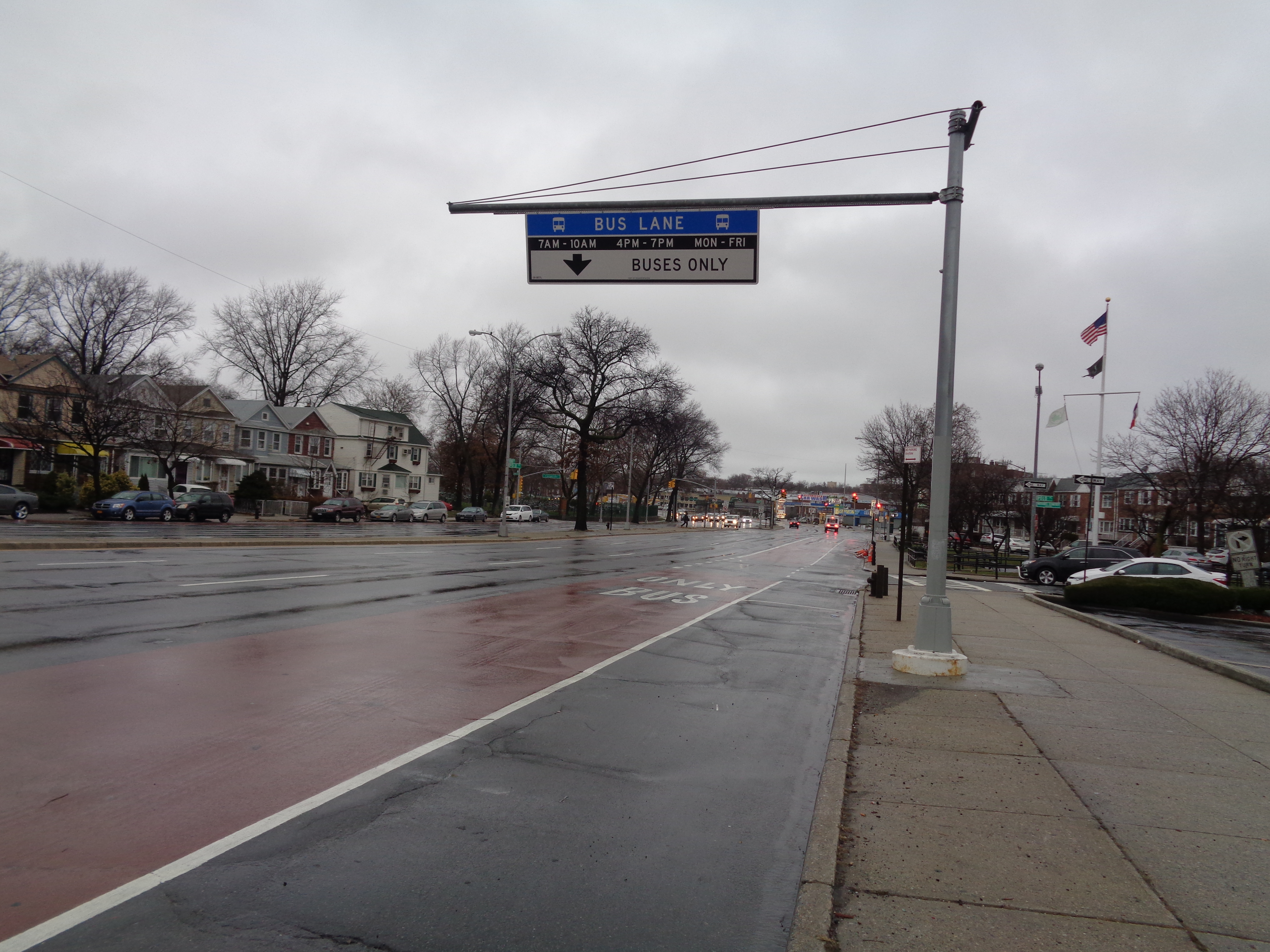
Offset Woodhaven Boulevard bus lane north of Metropolitan Avenue in Queens

Prior to installing the bus lane cameras, there were disputes between the MTA and the City of New York over who will get the revenue from the tickets. At first the MTA refused to allow the cameras until the city would agree to split the revenue. The city regularly reports revenue from violations issued by the automated cameras. In one instance a camera issued nearly 7,200 violations in a two-month period, translating to an average of 115 tickets a day, and raising about $823,000 in fine revenue.

== Benefits ==
Bus lanes have generally increased average bus speeds and reduced travel times where they are installed. For instance, after bus lanes were installed along East 125th Street in East Harlem in 2014, the average speeds of the M60 Select Bus Service route along that segment increased 32% to 34%, and the average speeds of the M100 and Bx15 local buses increased 7% to 20%. By contrast, along West 125th Street where bus lanes were not initially installed, there was no marked increase in local bus speeds. The speeds of M60 SBS buses increased 27% to 36%, but only as a result of other improvements such as off-board fare payment and fewer stops. Another corridor, Fordham Road in the Bronx, saw a 14% to 24% increase in average bus speeds on the Bx12 route after bus lanes were installed.

== Controversies ==
While bus lanes reduce the time for bus commuters, they may create traffic jams and increase travel time for other vehicles. On one bus lane, some drivers reported that travel times had more than doubled, and residents reported increased honking and pollution, despite a study by the NYCDOT indicating that there would not be increased traffic for other vehicles. The cameras allow for a temporary stop to pick up/drop off passengers at curbside bus lanes, but cab drivers are concerned that customers may take longer than usual to arrange payment, which may result in a fine. The installation of bus lanes reduced the amount of on-street parking in some areas, in turn potentially forcing the closures of businesses.

In one incident in 2014, the city delayed mailing out the violations for a few months, causing violators to receive multiple tickets that added up to as much as $7,000. According to one commentator for The New York Times, this did not serve the purpose of the cameras, which were to educate drivers and keep the bus lanes empty of cars. The city agreed to review the violations and to keep each driver liable only for the first violation they received. There was a bus lane camera on Staten Island that gave tickets to drivers who failed to make an immediate right turn, even though it was not possible to make the right turn, since the next possible turn was a private driveway or a one-way street that had traffic running in the opposite direction. One retired police officer showed that his ticket was withheld by the judge and the appeals system. The city eventually turned off the camera.
