= 79th Street (Manhattan) =

West-east street in Manhattan, New York

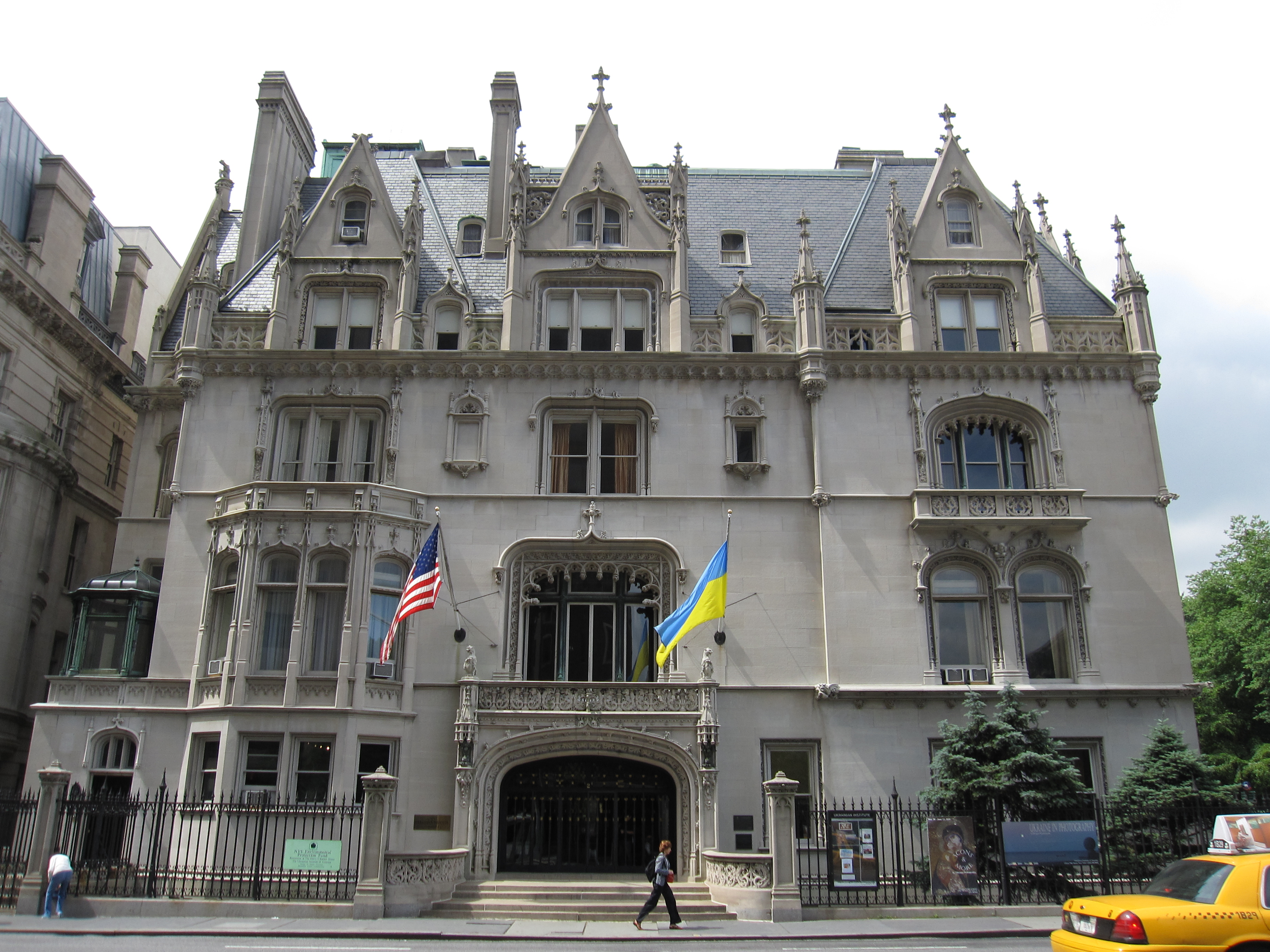
- The Harry F. Sinclair House at 2 East 79th Street
- Maintained by: NYCDOT
- Length: 2.4 mi (3.9 km)
- Width: 100 feet (30.48 m)
- Location: Manhattan
- Postal code: 10024 (west), 10075 (east)
- Coordinates: 40.7768°N 73.9632°W
- West end: NY 9A / Henry Hudson Parkway in Riverside Park
- East end: FDR Drive in Yorkville
- North: 80th Street
- South: 78th Street

Construction
- Commissioned: 1811

79th Street is a major two-way street on the Upper East Side and Upper West Side of the New York City borough of Manhattan. It runs in two major sections: between East End and Fifth Avenues on the Upper East Side, and between Columbus Avenue and Henry Hudson Parkway on the Upper West Side. The two segments are connected by the 79th Street transverse across Central Park, as well as one block of 81st Street.

On the West Side, the street is entirely within the boundaries of ZIP Code 10024; on the East Side, the street is part of ZIP Code 10075.

== Description ==
On the Upper East Side, East 79th Street stretches from East End Avenue, passing the New York Public Library Yorkville Branch to Fifth Avenue. where the entrance to the 79th Street Transverse is flanked by The 79th Street transverse crosses Central Park between Children's Gate at Fifth Avenue, and Hunter's Gate at Central Park West and 81st Street on the Upper West Side. 79th Street does not exist between Central Park West and Columbus Avenue, due to the superblock of Manhattan Square, largely occupied by the American Museum of Natural History. West of Columbus Avenue, 79th Street continues and terminates in Riverside Park at a roundabout directly after the exit/entrance ramps for the Henry Hudson Parkway, under which sit the 79th Street Boat Basin and its cafe.

== History ==
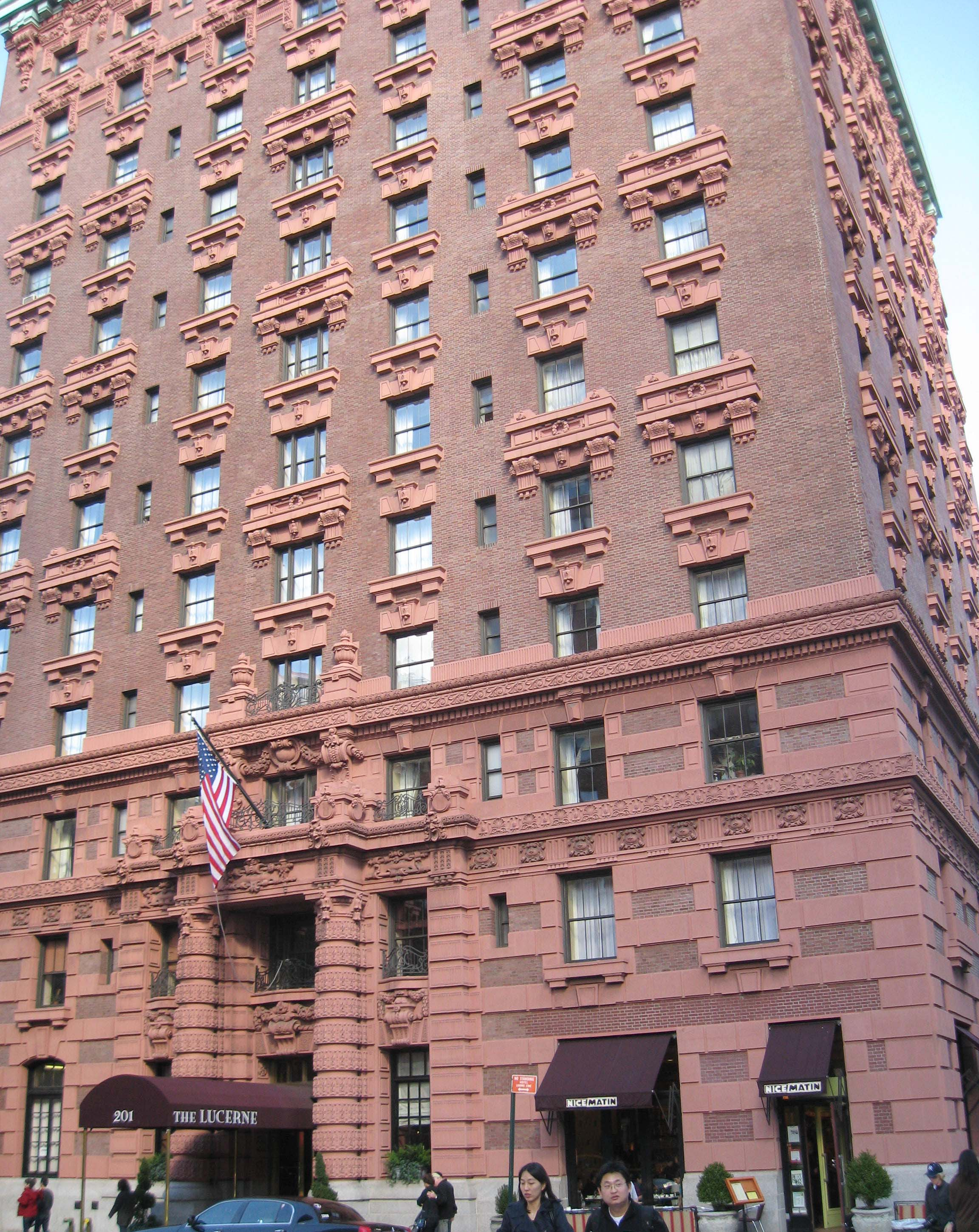
Lucerne Apartments, 201 West 79th Street, at Amsterdam Avenue (Harry B. Mulliken, architect, as Hotel Lucerne, 1903–04)

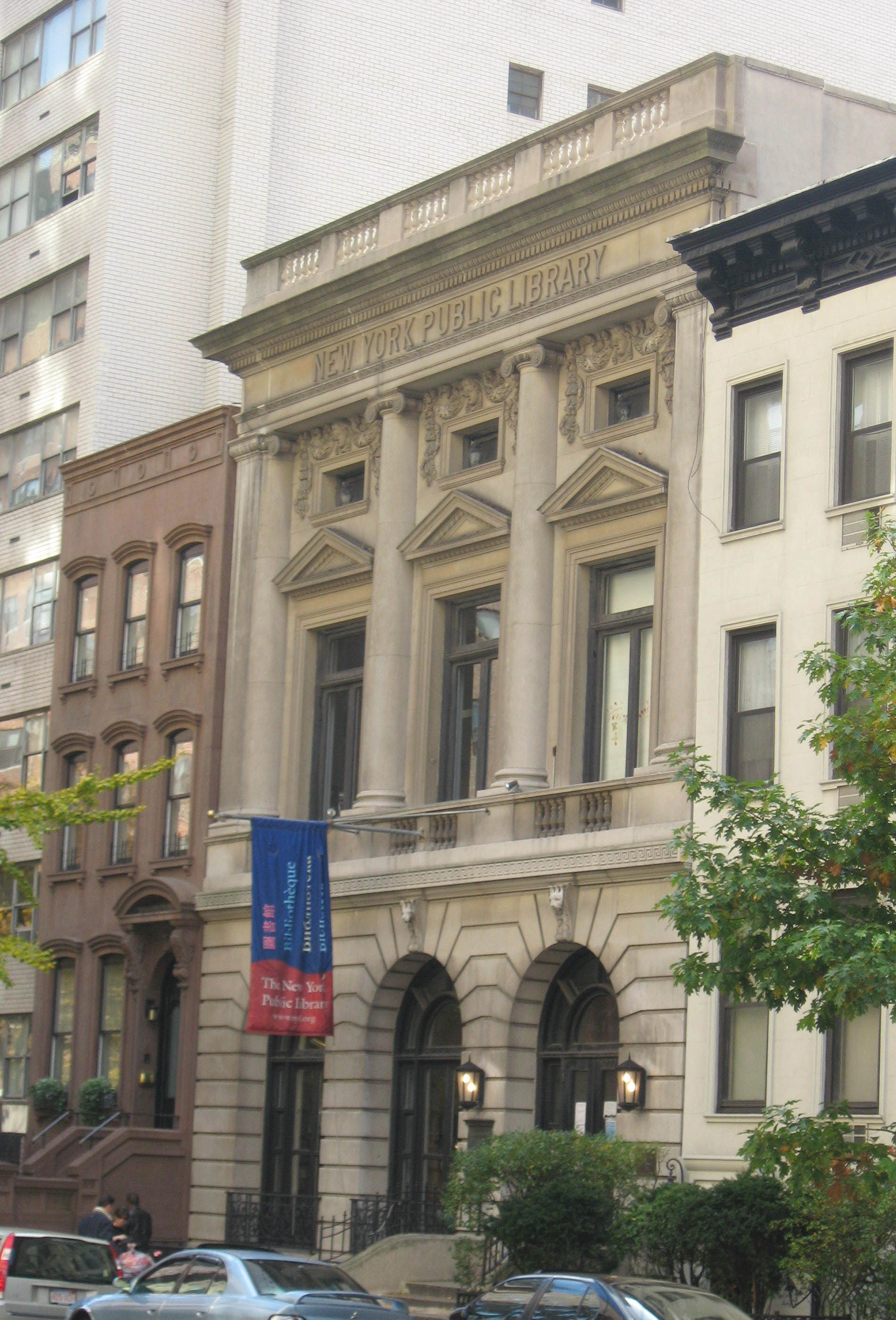
The Palladian style NYPL Yorkville Branch Library at 222 East 79th Street (James Brown Lord, 1902) fits between modest townhouse facades; bronze owls stand in the mezzanine windows

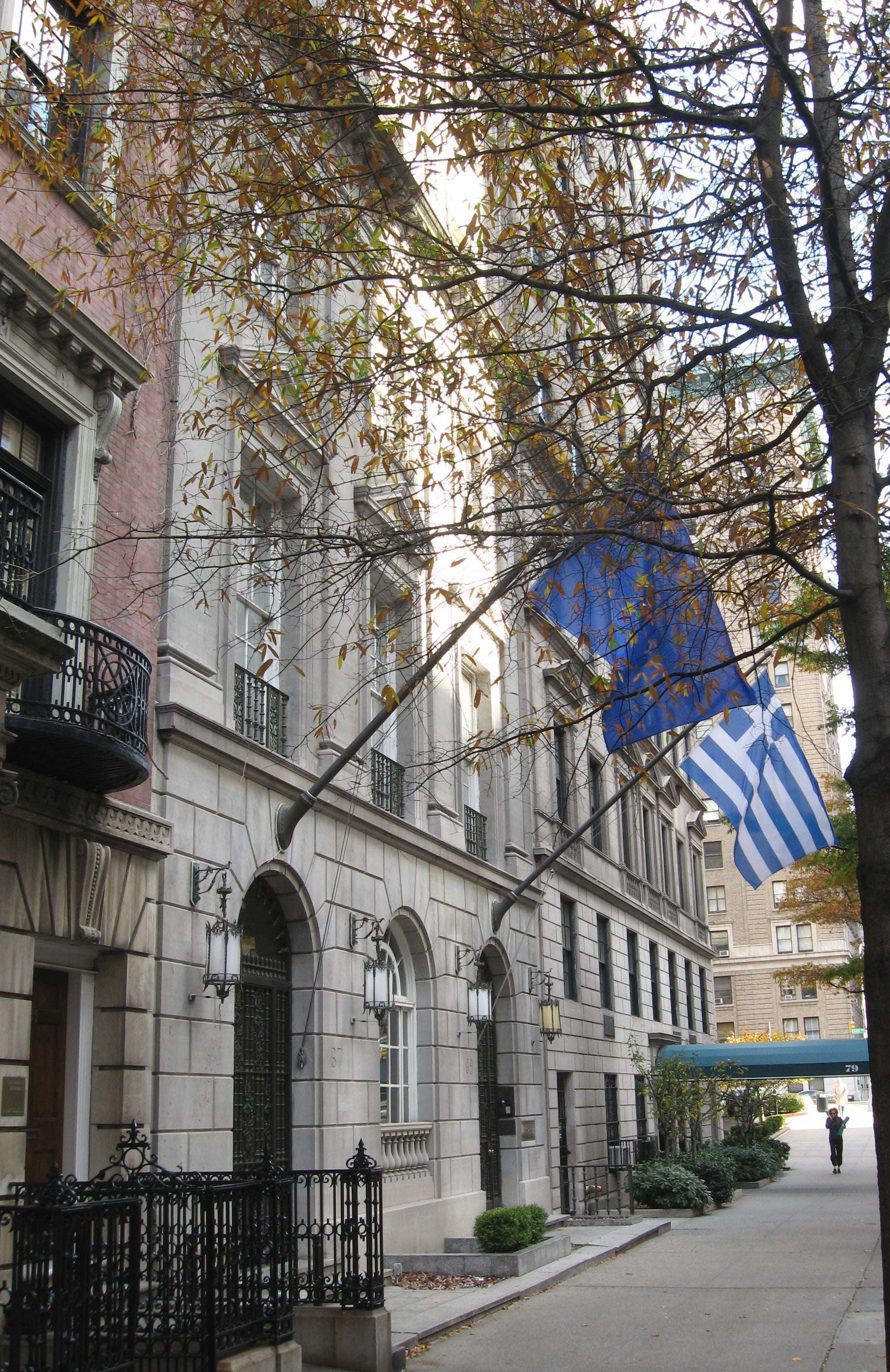
The Greek Consulate occupies the former George L. Rives residence, 67–69 East 79th Street (Carrère and Hastings, 1907–08)

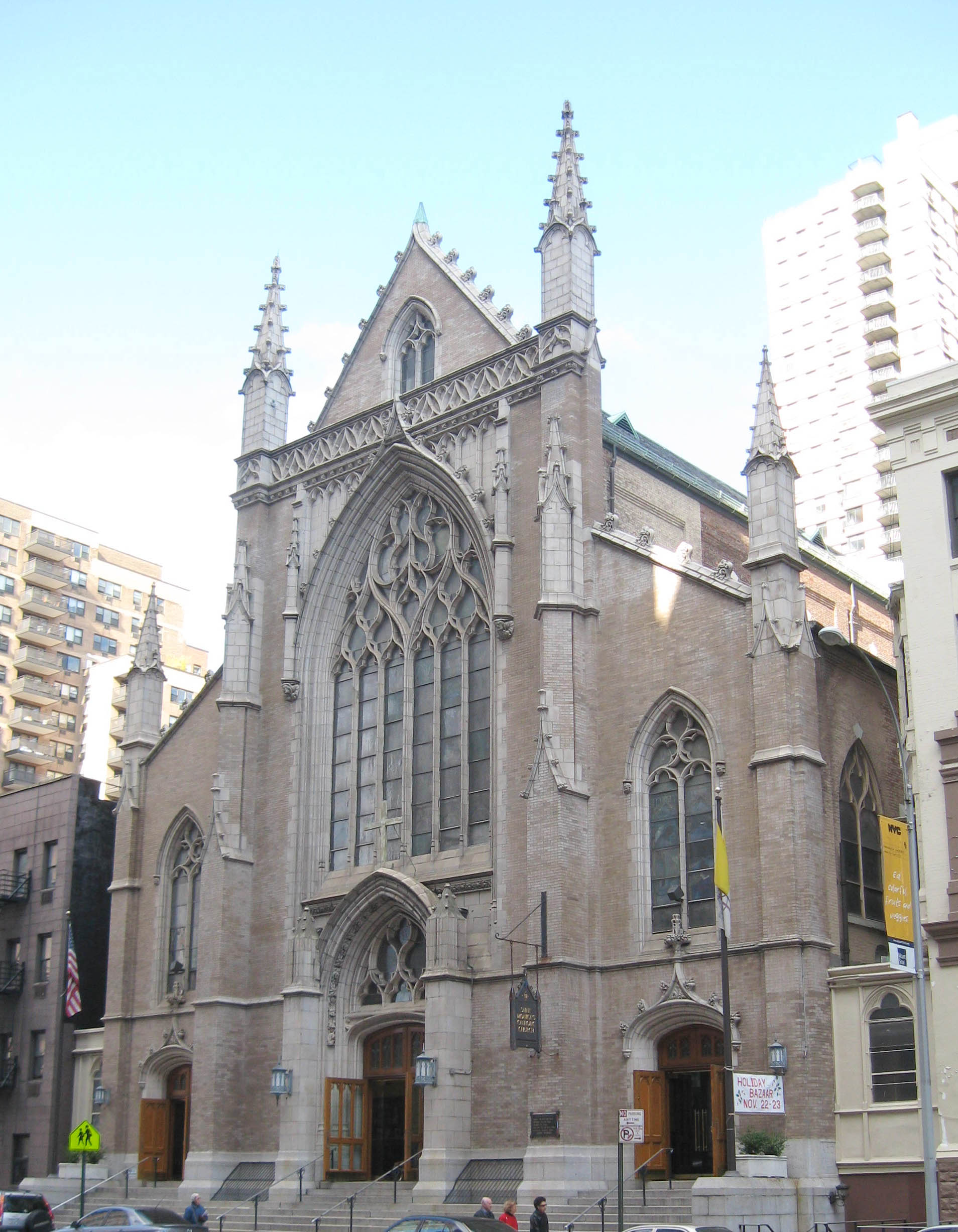
St. Monica's Roman Catholic Church, 1881–83

The street was designated by the Commissioners' Plan of 1811 that established the Manhattan street grid as one of 15 east-west streets that would be 100 feet (30 m) in width (while other streets were designated as 60 feet (18 m) in width).

The interchange on the Hudson River and the boat basin was first proposed in 1934 and was constructed by 1937 during the tenure of Robert Moses as Parks Commissioner. It was part of the "79th Street Grade Crossing Elimination Structure" which created a grand architectural multi-level entry and exit from the Henry Hudson Parkway while eliminating a grade crossing of the New York Central Railroad's West Side Line by covering it over and creating the Freedom Tunnel. Designed by Gilmore David Clarke, the Works Projects Administration provided $5.1 million for the project, which also included an underground parking garage, a restaurant, and the marina.

In 2025, the New York City Department of Transportation announced plans to spend $60 million upgrading 79th Street to improve service on the M79 SBS crosstown bus route. These modifications included changes to traffic-signal timing and the addition of a bus lane and bus queue-jumps.

== Transportation ==
On the west side, the 79th Street station on the New York City Subway's IRT Broadway–Seventh Avenue Line is located at the intersection of 79th Street and Broadway, it is served by 1 train at all times and by the 2 train during the night. The 81st Street-Museum of Natural History station of the IND Eighth Avenue Line is located at 81st Street and Central Park West. It is served by the C train except at night, when the A train takes over, and the B train only on weekdays during the day.

On the east side, the 77th Street station on the IRT Lexington Avenue Line is two blocks south. It is served by the 6 train at all times and by the 4 train during the night.

The M79 SBS crosstown bus route runs between East End Avenue and Riverside Drive via 79th Street at all times, using the roundabout near the 79th Street Boat Basin to change direction. Eastbound service on the street heads to West 81st Street via Amsterdam Avenue due to Columbus Avenue being a downtown-only corridor, and ends at York Avenue.

== Notable locations ==
- At Broadway stands The Apthorp (Clinton and Russell, architects, 1908), one of the West Side's classic apartment blocks, and the First Baptist Church in the City of New York (George M. Kaiser, architect, 1891).
- Between 6th and 7th Avenues, on the line of West 79th Street as it was drawn through what became Central Park was the south end of the Receiving Reservoir, a vital storage part of the Croton Aqueduct of 1842. Water was piped down from Westchester County, over the Harlem River and down the west side to the Receiving Reservoir, located between 79th and 86th Streets and Sixth and Seventh Avenues in an area then known as Yorkville. The Reservoir was a fortress-like building 1,826 feet (557 m) long and 836 feet (255 m) wide, and held up to 180 million US gallons (680,000 m^{3}) of water, 35 million US gallons (130,000 m^{3}) flowed into it daily from northern Westchester.
- Former mayor Michael Bloomberg lives in a five-story townhouse on East 79th Street, between Madison Avenue and Fifth Avenue. Other notable residents of 79th Street include or have included; Tom Wolfe, Reggie Jackson, Art Garfunkel and Eliot Spitzer. Socialite Nan Kempner lived on 79th Street at Park Avenue.
- The south side of the block between Fifth and Madison is protected as a rare unbroken row of townhouses. It begins at the corner of Fifth with the French Renaissance Harry F. Sinclair House (1897–98), now housing the Ukrainian Institute.
- Four landmarked townhouses exist on the north side of 79th Street between Madison and Park Avenues:
  - 53 East 79th Street (Trowbridge & Livingston, 1916–1918), built for John S. and Catherine Dodge Rogers. It houses the New York Society Library, the city's oldest circulating library, founded in 1754.
  - 59 East 79th Street (Foster, Gade & Graham, 1908–1909), built for John H. and Caroline Iselin
  - 63 East 79th Street (Adams & Warren, 1902–1903), built for Thatcher and Frances Adams
  - 69 East 79th Street (Carrère & Hastings, 1907–1908), built for George and Sarah Rives
- Between York Avenue and the FDR Drive is the York Avenue Estate, which is a city landmark.
- On the street grid, East 79th Street leads to an unnumbered southbound-only entrance to the FDR Drive at East 78th Street. East 79th Street is also the southern end of East End Avenue, which runs north-south to 90th Street.

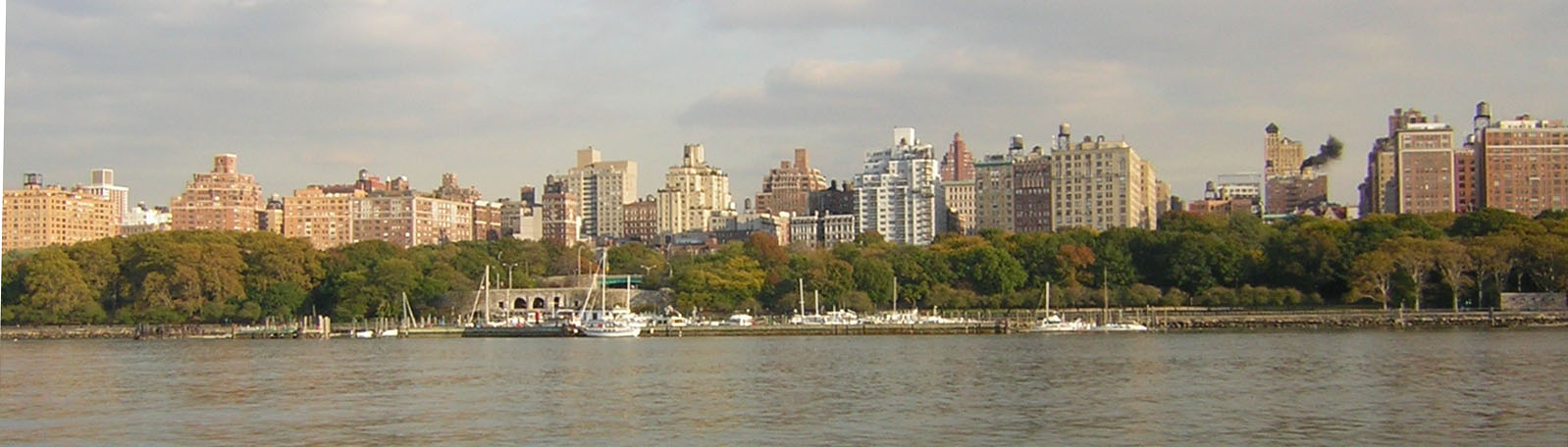
The 79th Street Boat Basin
