= Yorkville Library =

Library in Manhattan, New York

- New York Public Library: Yorkville Branch
- U.S. National Register of Historic Places
- New York State Register of Historic Places
- New York City Landmark
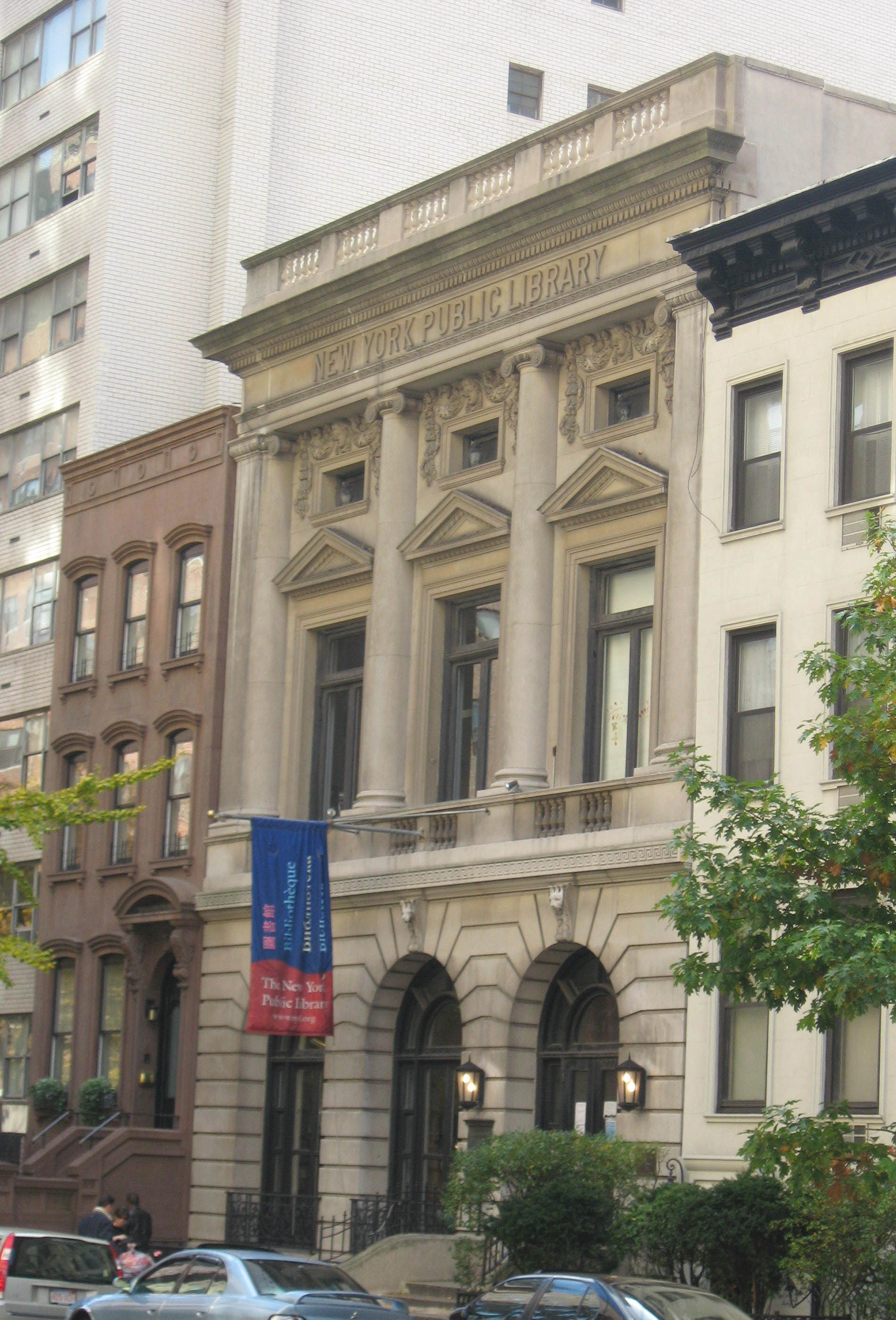
- Yorkville Branch in 2008
- Location: 222 East 79th Street, Manhattan, New York, US
- Coordinates: 40°46′25″N 73°57′23″W
- Built: 1902
- Architect: James Brown Lord
- Architectural style: Late 19th and 20th Century Revivals, Italian Renaissance
- NRHP reference No.: 82003386
- NYSRHP No.: 06101.000080
- NYCL No.: 0425

Significant dates
- Added to NRHP: July 15, 1982
- Designated NYSRHP: April 16, 1982
- Designated NYCL: January 24, 1967

The Yorkville Library is a branch of the New York Public Library located at 222 East 79th Street in the Yorkville neighborhood of Manhattan in New York City, New York, US. Designed by James Brown Lord in the Italian Renaissance style, the building has a three-story-high limestone facade. Built with funds from Andrew Carnegie, it opened in December 1902 as the first Carnegie library in Manhattan. The building has remained a library since then and was renovated in 1960 and the late 1980s. It is a New York City designated landmark and is listed on the National Register of Historic Places.

== Description ==
The New York Public Library's Yorkville Library branch is located at 222 East 79th Street in the Yorkville neighborhood of Manhattan in New York City, New York, US. It is an Italian Renaissance-style Carnegie library designed by James Brown Lord, and, like many of Manhattan's Carnegie libraries, is located in the middle of a block. The building measures 40 by 90 feet (12 by 27 m) across. The New York City Landmarks Preservation Commission (LPC) has described the building as "one of New York's most elegant adaptions of the Palladian style to a modern public building". The AIA Guide to New York City wrote that the branch was "here for the masses, not for the classes".

The building has a three-story-high limestone facade, along with an attic and basement concealed from the street. The limestone facade is divided into three bays with relatively restrained decorations. The first floor is rusticated and has round arches topped by keystones in the shape of lions' heads. Above the first floor, a belt course with Greek fret designs runs horizontally across the facade. The upper-story bays are separated by Ionic columns, with pilasters at either end of the facade. There are owls above the columns. The second-story windows have triangular pediments above them, while the third-story windows are small and are surrounded by swags. A large entablature, as well as a balustrade with small blocks placed every half-bay, run above the third story.

When the library branch was completed, there were a reference room and adult circulating collections on the first floor, a children's room on the second floor, a reading and exhibit room on the third floor. There was also a janitor's suite on the fourth floor, and mechanical equipment in the basement. The interior has undergone renovations over the years, including the addition of partitions, acoustic dropped ceilings, and fluorescent lights. The original design's Tuscan columns remain intact, and a three-story staircase with original decorative iron railing and wooden banister runs along the library's right (west) side. The bookcases have decorative anthemion-leaf plates with catalog numbers. The dropped ceilings were removed and an air-conditioning system, new furniture, carpeting, and lighting were added as part of a late-1980s renovation.

== History ==
The Yorkville Library was one of 65 Carnegie libraries in New York City to be funded through a donation from the businessman Andrew Carnegie, who donated $5.2 million (equivalent to $201,240,000 in 2025) for the purpose in 1901. The New York Public Library had acquired a site on 79th Street between Second and Third avenues before Carnegie announced his gift. This site was to be used by the Yorkville branch, which at the time occupied a storefront at the intersection of Second Avenue and 79th Street. The new building was dedicated on December 13, 1902, and opened on December 15. It was the first Carnegie library in the city to be completed, though Carnegie himself was not allowed to attend due to his doctor's orders. It was one of Lord's final designs to be built before his death. The building had cost $70,000 to build (equivalent to $2,605,000 in 2025).

Originally, the building had a German-language collection on the third floor to cater to Yorkville's large German population. In its first year after moving to the 79th Street building, the branch's patronage increased fourfold from 12,000 to 49,000, and circulation increased threefold from 58,000 to 180,000. Among the library's early patrons was Tomáš Masaryk, who conducted research there and later founded Czechoslovakia. By the mid-20th century, library volunteers used the third story for reading books aloud to the blind. Recording for the Blind also recorded audiobooks at the Yorkville Library. In 1952, a party was hosted at the building to celebrate its 50th anniversary.

The library was closed for a $155,000 repair project in 1960, the first major repairs in the building's history. These repairs involved refurbishing the library stacks, furniture, roof, and mechanical systems. The collection was moved to a bookmobile while repairs proceeded. The LPC designated the building as a city landmark on January 24, 1967, and the building was added to the National Register of Historic Places in 1982. The branch was closed in February 1986 for renovations, designed by Charles Gwathmey. The project was funded by a $250,000 donation from the family of the businessman Frederick P. Rose and $500,000 from the city. The building reopened in June 1987; at the time, it could fit 22,000 books.

== See also ==
- National Register of Historic Places listings in Manhattan from 59th to 110th Streets
- List of New York City Designated Landmarks in Manhattan from 59th to 110th Streets
