= M79 (New York City bus) =

Bus route in Manhattan, New York

m79
- 79th Street Crosstown Line
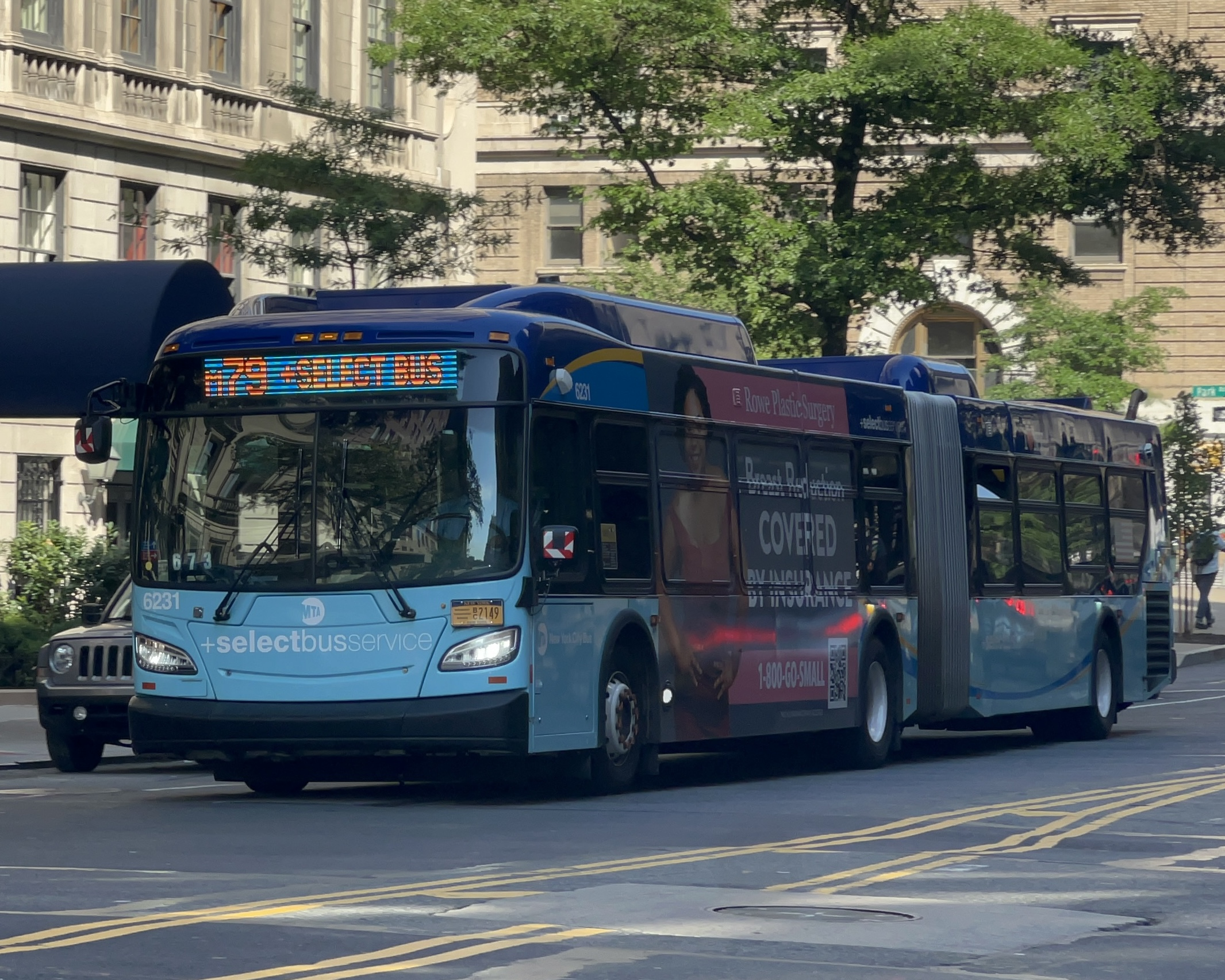
- A 2019 XD60 (6231) on the Riverside Drive-bound M79 SBS in 2024

Overview
- System: MTA Regional Bus Operations
- Operator: Manhattan and Bronx Surface Transit Operating Authority
- Garage: Michael J. Quill Depot
- Vehicle: Nova Bus LFS articulated New Flyer Xcelsior XD60; New Flyer Xcelsior XE60 (main vehicles); New Flyer Xcelsior XD40; New Flyer Xcelsior XE40; Nova Bus LFS HEV (supplemental service)
- Livery: Select Bus Service
- Began service: 1936

Route
- Locale: Manhattan, New York, U.S.
- Communities served: Upper West Side, Upper East Side, Yorkville
- Landmarks served: Central Park, Metropolitan Museum of Art, American Natural History Museum
- Start: Upper West Side – Riverside Drive and West 79th Street
- Via: 79th Street, 81st Street
- End: Yorkville – East End Avenue and East 79th Street
- Length: 2.3 miles (3.7 km)

Service
- Operates: All times.
- Annual patronage: 2,530,101 (2025)
- Transfers: Yes
- Timetable: M79 SBS

The M79 Select Bus Service, formerly the 79th Street Crosstown Line, is a bus line in Manhattan, New York City, running mostly along 79th Street on the Upper West and Upper East Sides of Manhattan. The route was previously owned by the private Green Bus Lines, and is now part of MTA Regional Bus Operations, operated by the Manhattan and Bronx Surface Transit Operating Authority under the New York City Transit brand.

The route was renumbered from the M17 to the M79 in 1987, and was converted into a Select Bus Service route in 2017.

== Route description ==
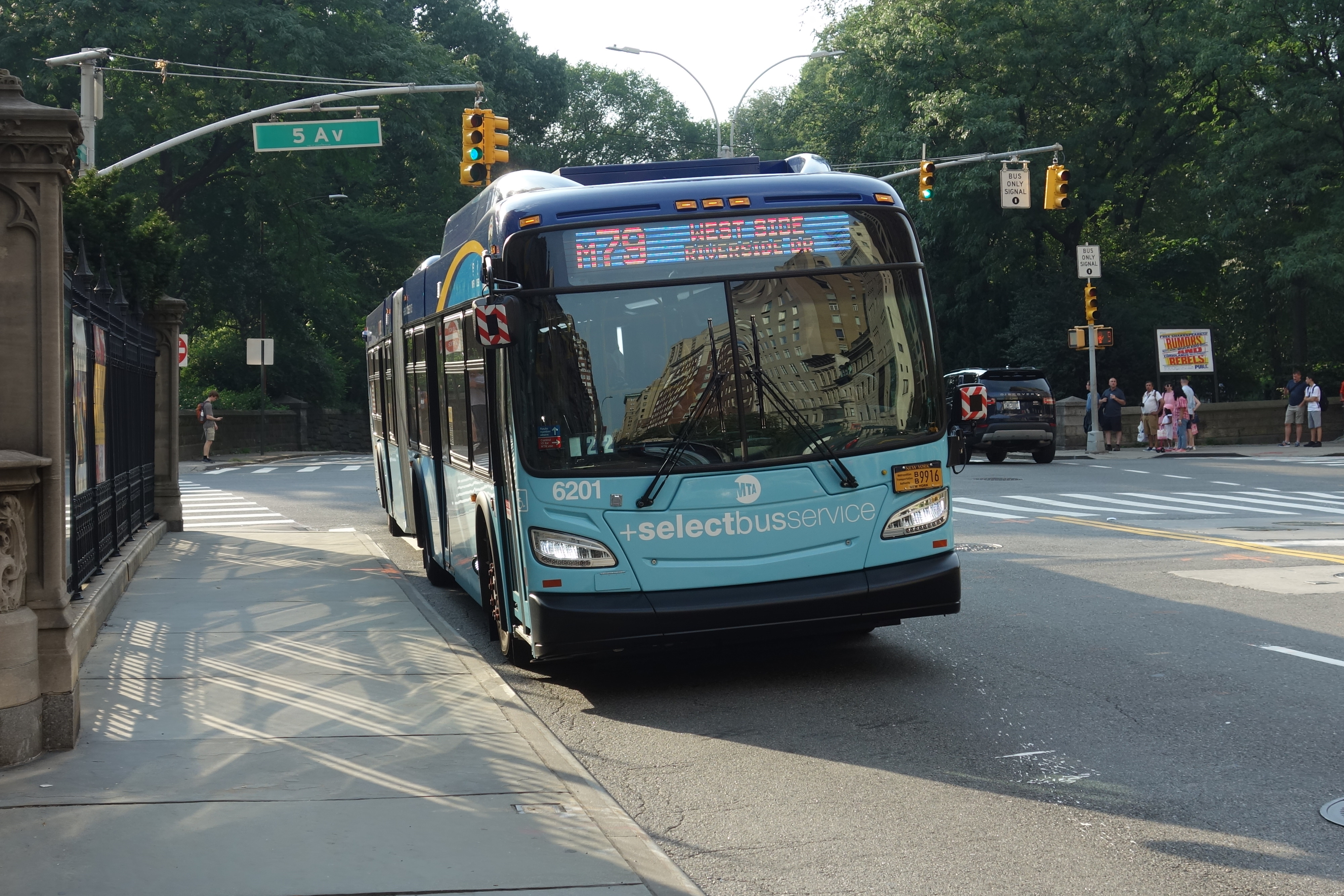
A 2019 XD60 (6201) on the Yorkville–bound M79 SBS at Upper East Side’s 79th St-5th Ave in July 2019, incorrectly displaying West Side.

The M79 bus runs crosstown along 79th Street in Upper Manhattan. The route begins at West 79th Street and Riverside Drive on the Upper West Side. It proceeds east along 79th Street to Amsterdam Avenue, where the eastbound bus uses Amsterdam Avenue to get to 81st Street; the westbound bus uses 81st Street to get to Columbus Avenue and then takes that down to 79th Street. After Central Park West, the bus then crosses the 79th Street Transverse through the park, with a stop about halfway through the transverse. The M79 exits the transverse at East 79th Street and Fifth Avenue, continuing on East 79th Street through the Upper East Side until turning left onto York Avenue and then right again onto 80th Street before arriving to its terminus at 80th Street. The bus then turns right on East End Avenue and then right onto 79th Street to start its westbound route.

The westbound bus then continues on 79th Street to Fifth Avenue. After this, the bus keeps straight and merges onto the 79th Street Transverse. It then leaves the Transverse on the intersection of Central Park West and 81st Street and continues along 81st Street to Columbus Avenue and then turns left onto it and then turns right onto 79th Street two blocks later. It continues along 79th Street to its westbound terminus at Riverside Drive.

Unlike other SBS routes and most bus rapid transit lines, the M79 SBS does not have long bus lanes, but rather employs short queue jump lanes, which give buses priority at intersections.

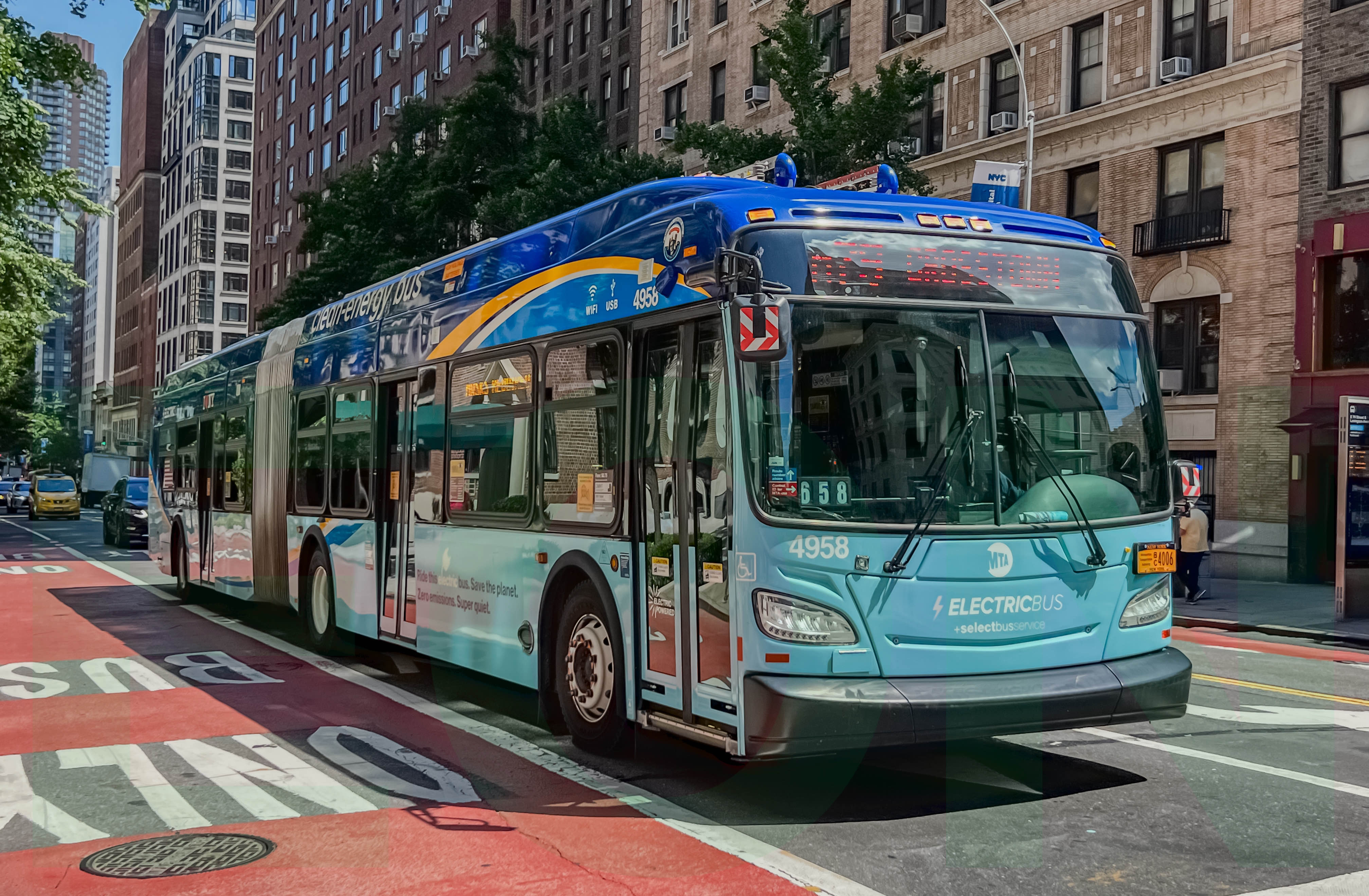
A 2019 XE60 (4958) on the Riverside-bound M79 SBS in June 2022

Station Street traveled	Direction	Connections
Riverside Drive West 79th Street	Westbound terminus, Eastbound station	NYC Bus: M5
Broadway West 79th Street	Bidirectional	NYC Bus: M104; NYC Subway: trains at 79th Street
West 79th Street Amsterdam Avenue	Eastbound	NYC Bus: M7, M11 (all buses northbound only)
Amsterdam Avenue West 79th Street	Westbound	NYC Bus: M7, M11 (all buses northbound only)
Columbus Avenue West 81st Street	Eastbound	NYC Bus: M7, M11 (all buses southbound only)
West 80th Street Columbus Avenue	Westbound	NYC Bus: M7, M11 (all buses southbound only)
Central Park West West 81st Street	Bidirectional	NYC Bus: M10; NYC Subway: trains at 81st Street–Museum of Natural History
Belvedere Castle 79th Street Transverse Road	Bidirectional	Note: riders boarding at the Central Park Transverse stop will need to obtain their proof of fare payment receipt at the next stop (Central Park West or Fifth Ave depending on direction of travel).
Fifth Avenue East 79th Street	Bidirectional	NYC Bus: M1, M2, M3, M4 (all buses southbound only)
Madison Avenue East 79th Street	Bidirectional	NYC Bus: M1, M2, M3, M4 (all buses northbound only)
Lexington Avenue East 79th Street	Bidirectional	NYC Bus: M98, M101, M102, M103 (all buses southbound only); NYC Subway: trains at 77th Street
Third Avenue East 79th Street	Bidirectional	NYC Bus: M98, M101, M102, M103 (all buses northbound only)
Second Avenue East 79th Street	Bidirectional	NYC Bus: M15 Local, M15 SBS (all buses southbound only)
First Avenue East 79th Street	Bidirectional	NYC Bus: M15 Local, M15 SBS (all buses northbound only)
East 79th Street York Avenue	Eastbound	NYC Bus: M31
York Avenue East 79th Street	Westbound	NYC Bus: M31
East End Avenue East 80th Street	Eastbound Terminus	
East End Avenue East 79th Street	Westbound Station	

== History ==
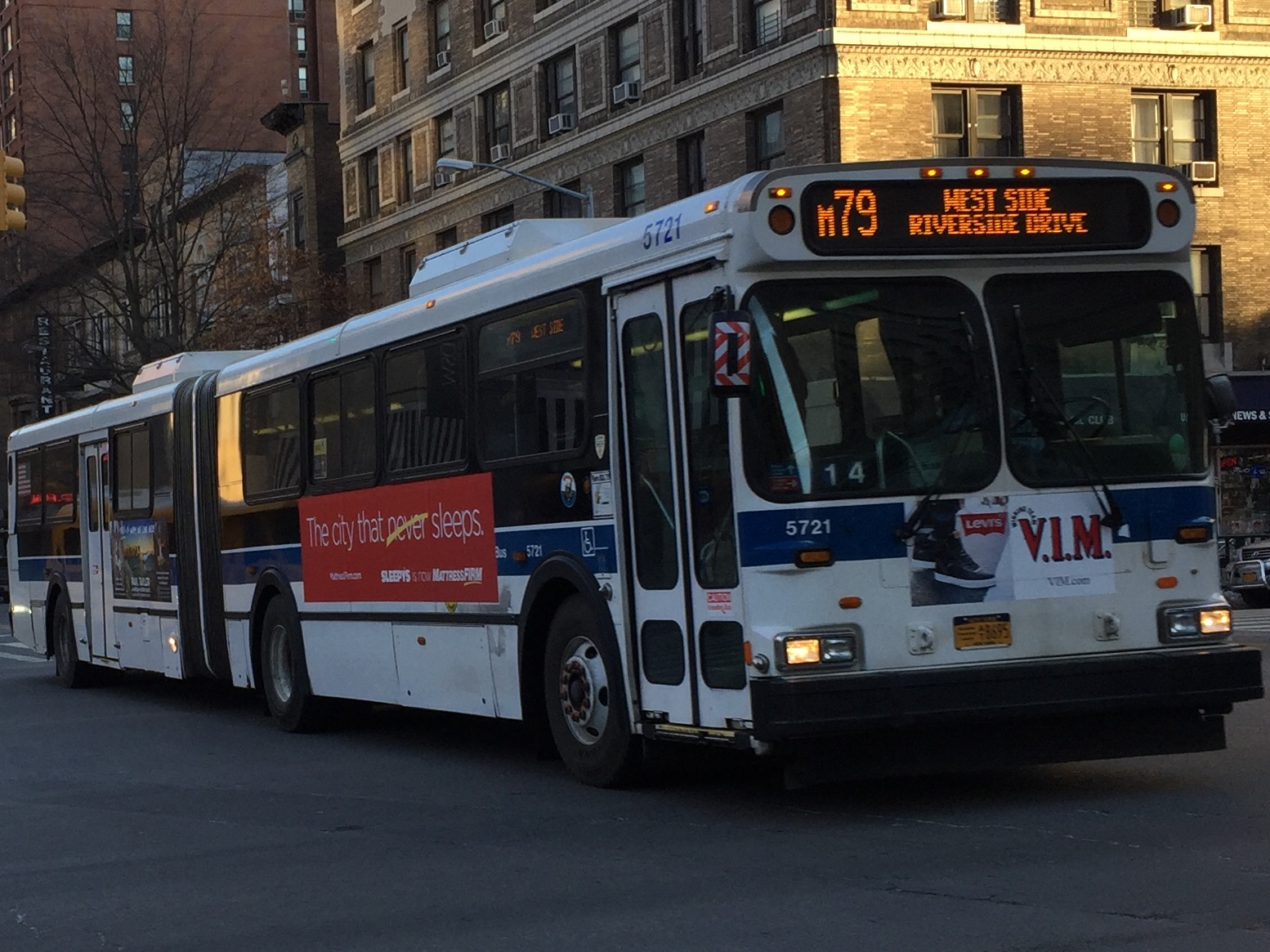
A 2003 D60HF (5721) on the Riverside Drive-bound M79 on Broadway prior to SBS implementation.

=== Early history ===
On November 30, 1921, the New York City Department of Plants and Structures began operating the 79th Street Crosstown M17 bus route. From 1933 to 1936 the bus line was operated by Green Bus Lines. On June 22, 1936, the New York City Omnibus Corporation took over operation of the route.

On September 27, 1987, the M17 was renumbered the M79, and some minor changes were made at the route's western terminal to eliminate having the route turn around on residential streets. The route's terminal was moved from West End Avenue and 81st Street to 79th Street and Riverside Drive. Westbound buses would continue west on 79th Street past Broadway to Riverside Drive to the terminal and then loop around the traffic circle to return in eastbound service. Previously, buses had a terminal loop of Broadway, 81st Street, West End Avenue, and 79th Street.

=== Select Bus Service ===
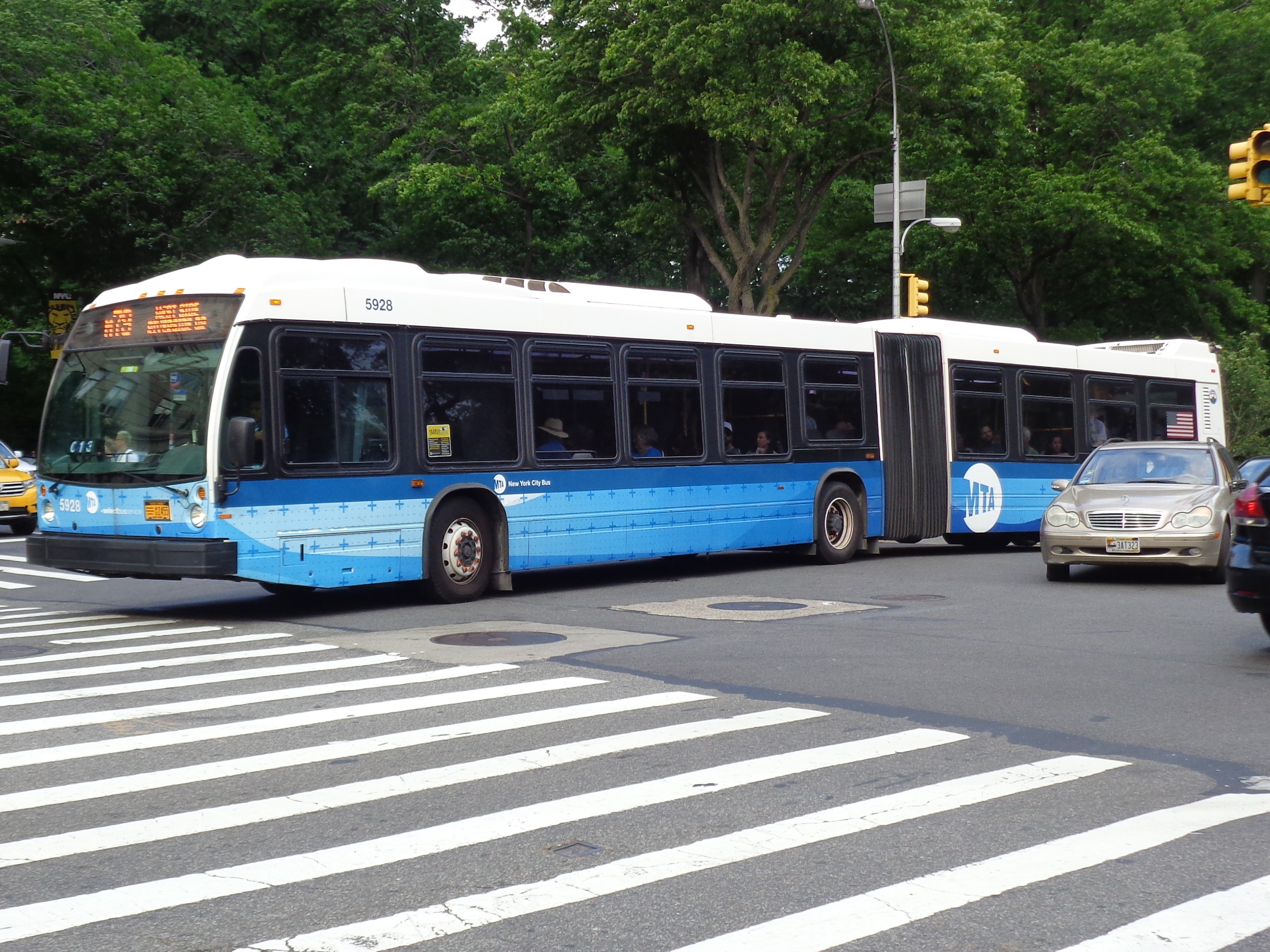
A 2012 Nova Bus LFS Articulated (5928) on the Upper West Side-bound M79 SBS at 81st Street and Central Park West, near American Museum of Natural History

The M79 was identified as a potential bus rapid transit corridor in 2009, under Phase II of the city's Select Bus Service program, and in a December 2013 study by the Pratt Center for Community Development of Brooklyn.

To accommodate the Select Bus Service conversion, 79th Street was to be renovated with plants and trees, and new benches.

The M79 SBS route debuted on May 21, 2017. It is currently based out of the Michael J. Quill Depot.

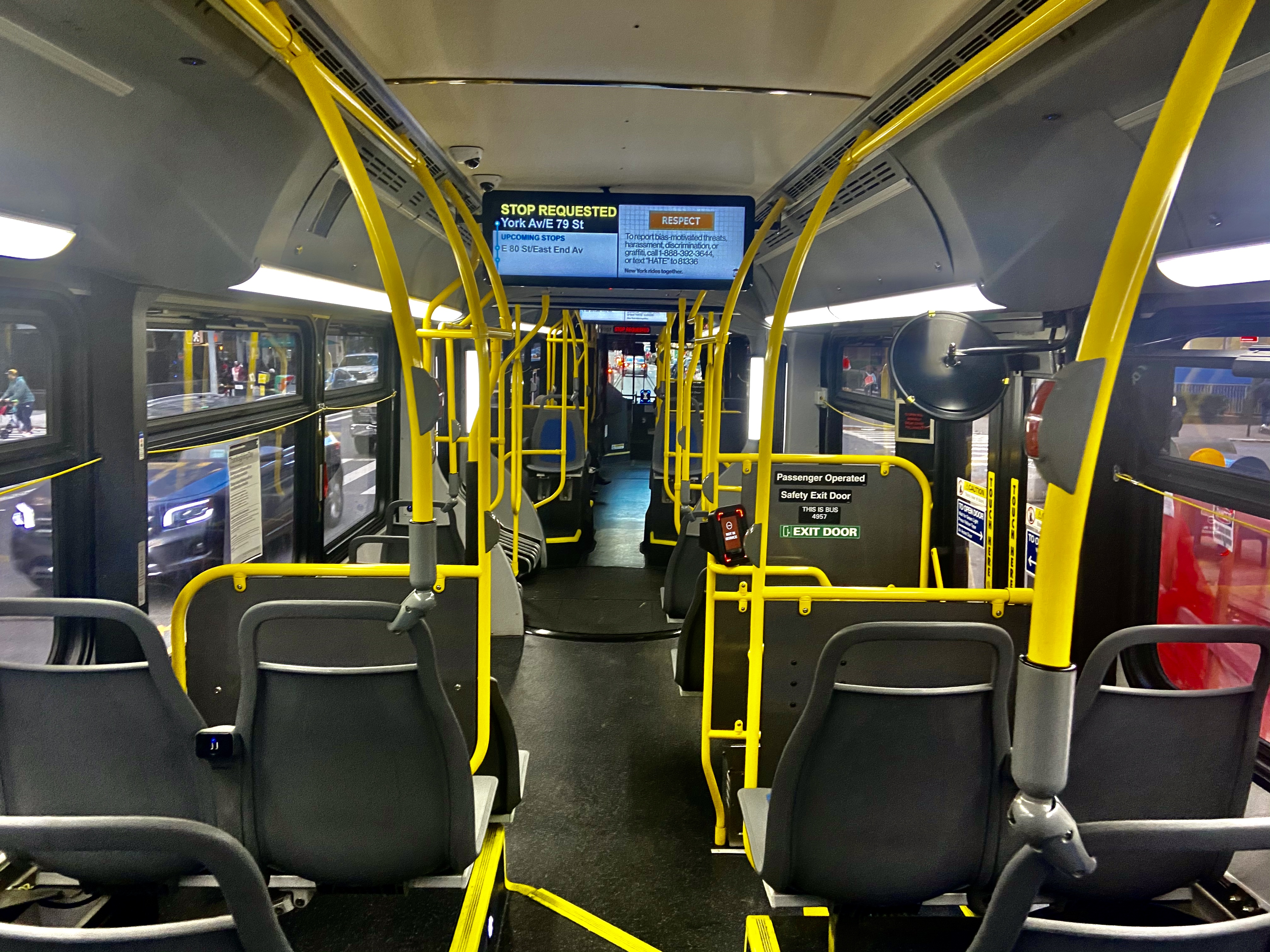
The interior of a 2019 XE60 (4957) on the Yorkville-bound M79 SBS approaching York Avenue/East 79th Street

== In popular culture ==
- The route is mentioned in a Vampire Weekend song of the same name on their self-titled debut album.
