= Double parking =

Driving offense

Double parking is the act of parking parallel to a vehicle already parked at the curb or parking in a manner that blocks another vehicle in attended car parks and garages.

== Parking parallel to a car parked at a curb ==
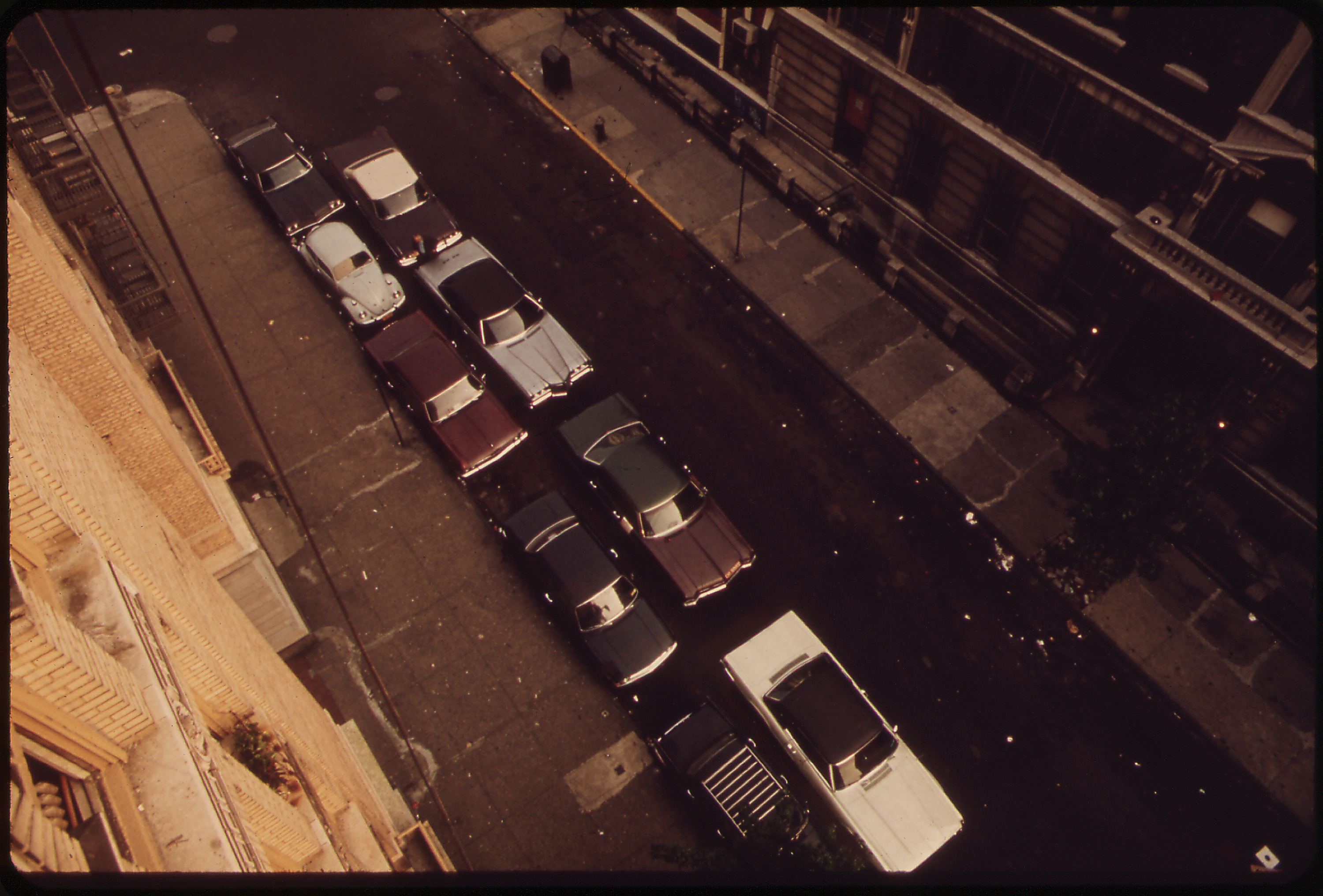
Cars double-parked on a New York City street in the 1970s

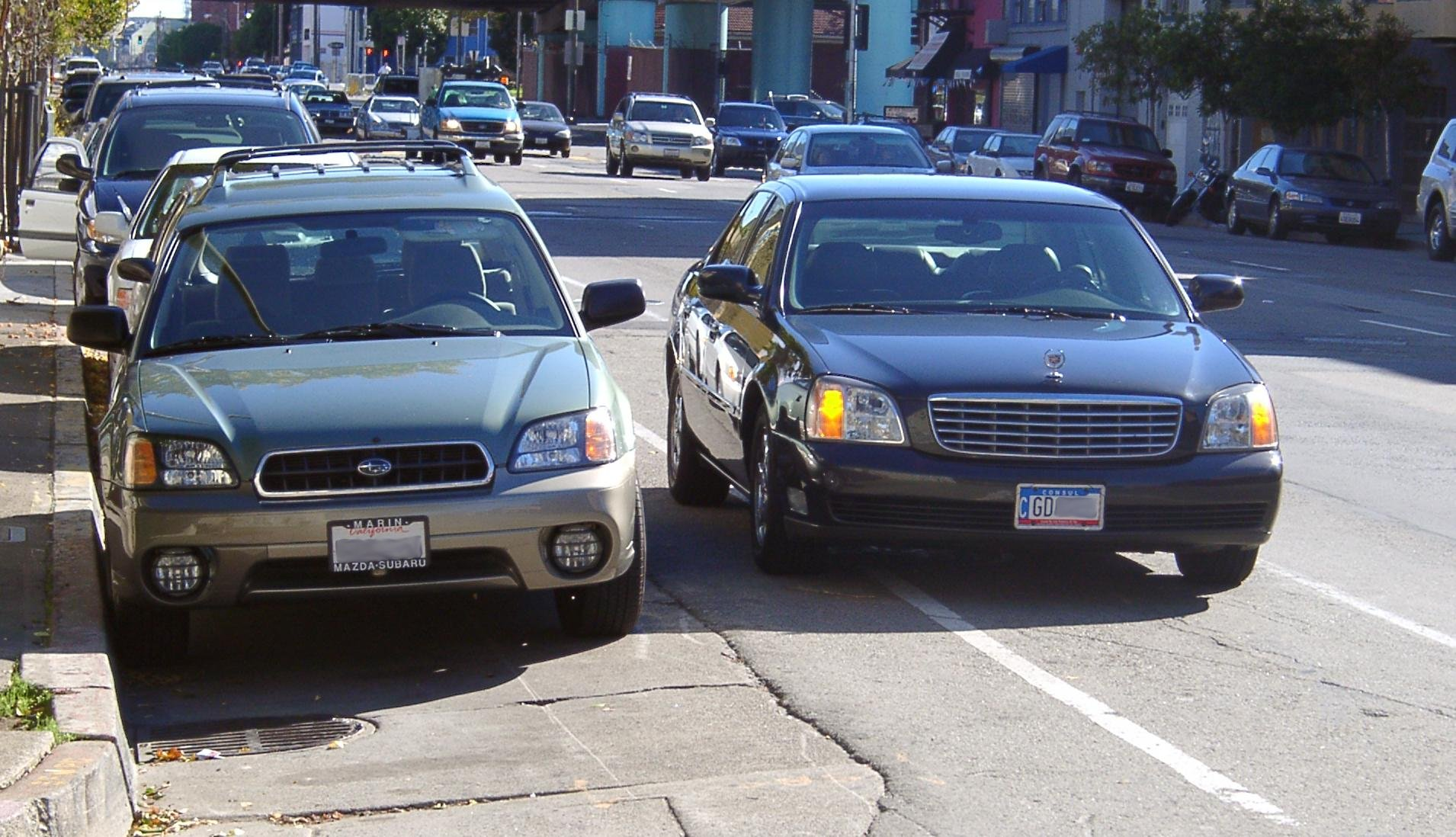
The car in the cycling lane is double-parked.

"Double parking" refers to the act of parking a vehicle on the roadway side of another vehicle already parked at the curb. This practice obstructs traffic lanes and can make streets impassable in single-lane situations. In some cases, drivers leave their handbrakes off to allow other vehicles to maneuver around them. Double parking is illegal in many areas and can result in tickets or towing of the offending vehicle.

In congested urban areas with limited parking, courier and delivery services may allow their drivers to double park if necessary. Drivers are instructed to turn in any parking tickets at the end of their shift. In Washington, D.C., companies can set up a monthly billing account for all vehicles that receive parking tickets.

== Double parking in attended car parks and garages ==
Attended car parks and garages often employ double parking to increase vehicle storage capacity. In this practice, a driver leaves their vehicle keys with the attendant when double-parking. If a blocked car needs to leave, the attendant can move the blocking car. This is commonly seen in valet car parks where attendants have access to all vehicle keys.
