= James Brown Lord =

American architect (1859–1902)

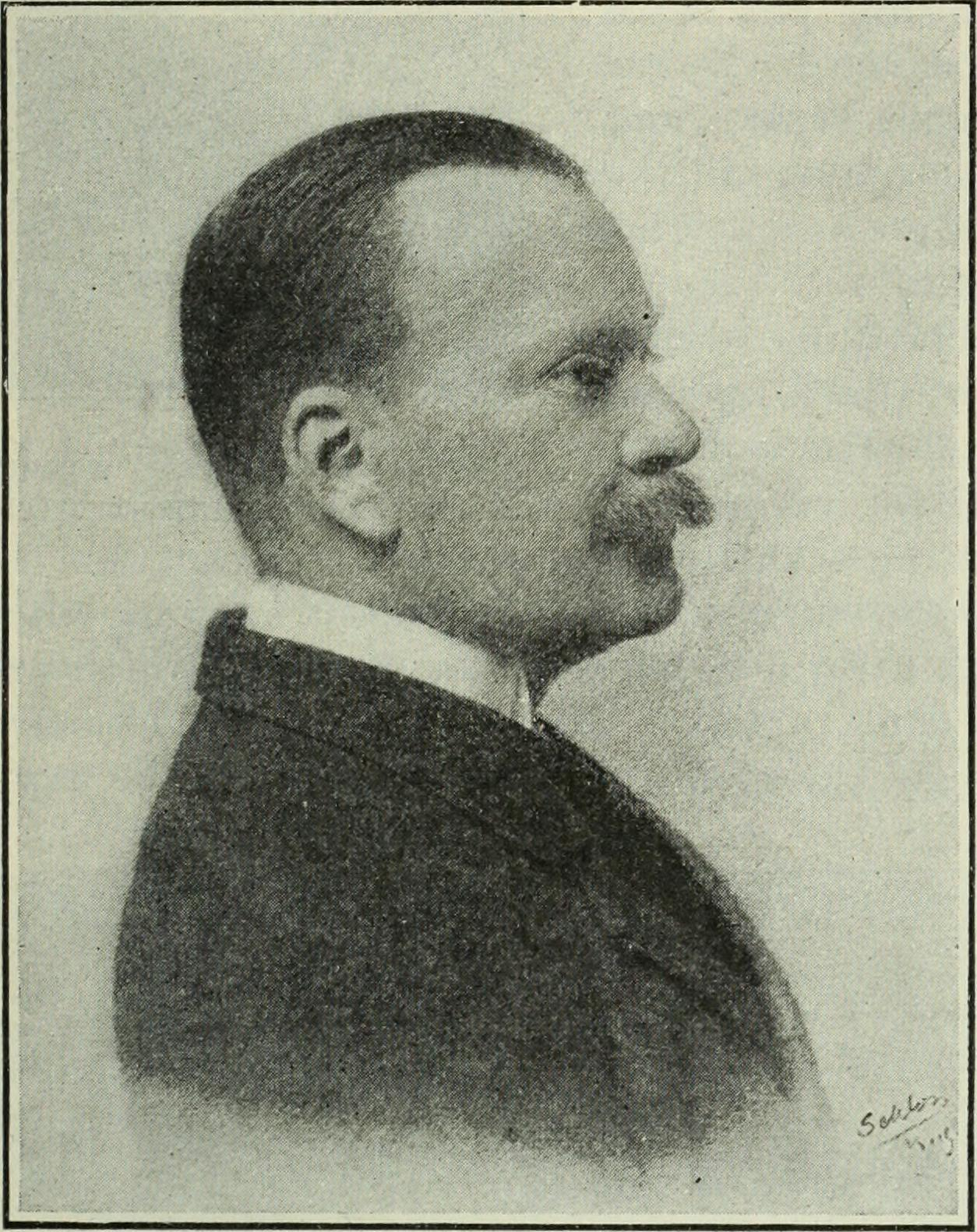
- James Brown Lord
- Born: April 26, 1859; New York
- Died: June 1, 1902 (aged 43); New York City
- Burial place: Green-Wood Cemetery, Brooklyn
- Education: Princeton University
- Occupation: Architect
- Known for: Designing the Appellate Division Courthouse of New York State
- Spouse: Mary Townsend Nicoll

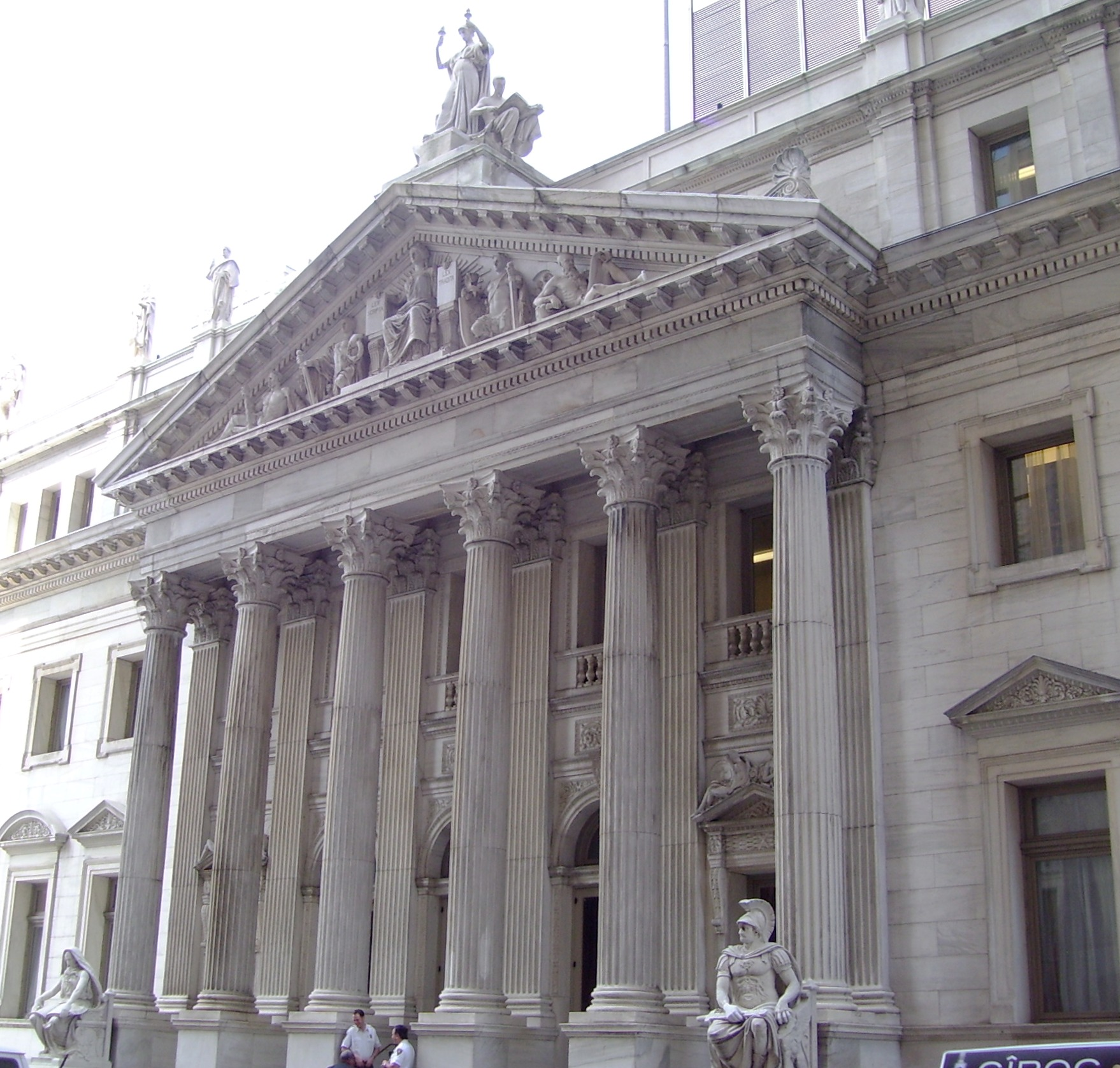
Appellate Court, Madison Square, 1900

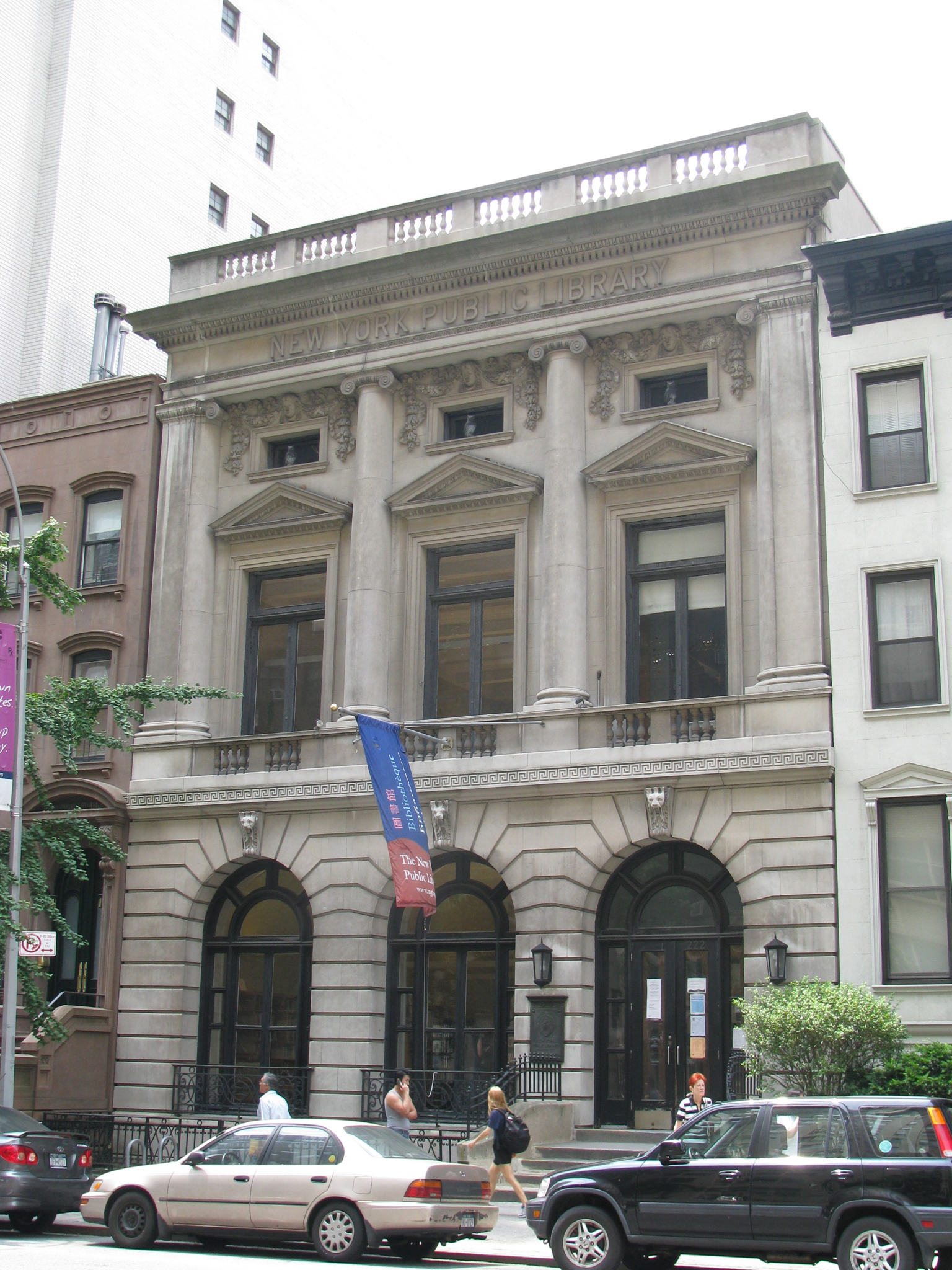
Yorkville Library of the New York Public Library, 1902

James Brown Lord (April 26, 1859 — June 1, 1902) was an American architect who worked in the Beaux-Arts style and practiced in New York City. According to his New York Times obituary, the Appellate Division Courthouse of New York State was his most prominent commission. He designed one of the first of the Carnegie libraries, the Yorkville Library of the New York Public Library, at 222 East 79th Street.

== Biography ==
Lord was born in New York, into a distinguished family, the son of James Couper Lord and grandson of Daniel Lord, a prominent lawyer in New York. His mother was a daughter of James Brown, founder of the firm that became Brown Brothers Harriman. He graduated from Princeton University in 1879 and apprenticed in the architectural office of William A. Potter. While in Potter's office he helped design the buildings for Union Theological Seminary, at Park Avenue and 70th Street (demolished). He was a member of the Tuxedo Club and designed many of the buildings at Tuxedo Park, New York.

He married Mary Townsend Nicoll, of a distinguished New York family and was a member of the Metropolitan Club, the Union League, the Players Club, the Racquet Club and professionally of the American Institute of Architects and the National Academy of Design, where he was a Fellow. He is buried in Green-Wood Cemetery, Brooklyn.

== Selected commissions ==
His early commissions, from 1883, were for residences in New York; Yonkers, Roslyn, Long Island; Tuxedo Park, New York; and Bar Harbor, Maine.

- King Model Houses, 138th to 139th Streets, between 7th and 8th Avenues. 1890. Conjointly with Stanford White and Bruce Price.
- Delmonico's, 56 Beaver Street (1890), and Delmonico's Fifth Avenue (1896, demolished).
- Appellate Court, Madison Avenue and 25th Street, New York. 1900.
- Society of New York Hospital for the Insane (Bloomingdale Asylum), White Plains, New York. 1894
- New York Infant Asylum, Amsterdam Avenue and 61st Street, New York (1901, demolished)
- Brookside Cottage, Tuxedo Park, New York (1892)
- St. Mary's-in-Tuxedo Episcopal Church Parish House, Tuxedo Park, New York (1901)

== See also ==
- Statue of Chester A. Arthur
