= Liffey Valley =

Shopping centre in Dublin, Ireland

Liffey Valley Shopping Centre
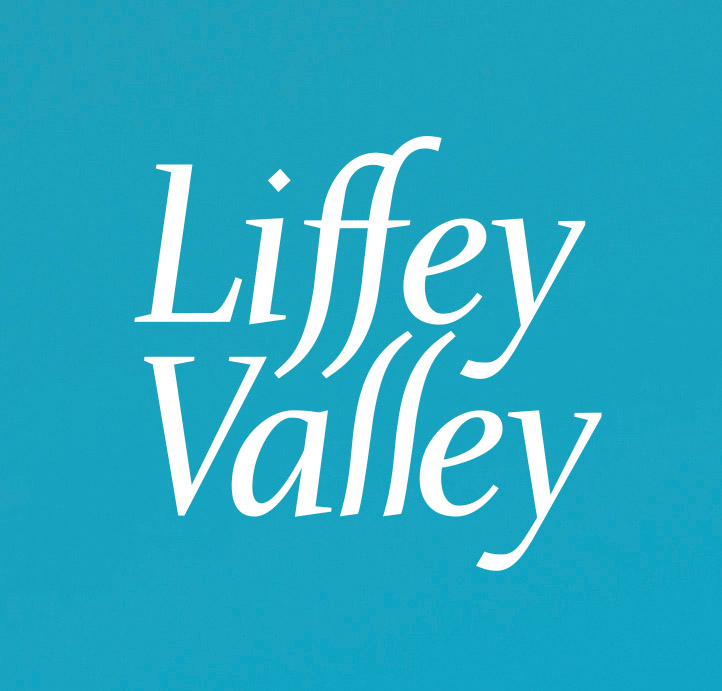
- Location: Dublin 22
- Coordinates: 53°21′12″N 6°23′32″W
- Address: 22 Fonthill Road, Dublin 22
- Opened: 14 October 1998; 28 years ago
- Num. of stores: 96
- Num. of anchor tenants: 5
- Floors: 2
- Parking: 3,600
- Website: www.liffeyvalley.ie

Liffey Valley Shopping Centre is a shopping centre located in Dublin, Ireland which comprises 80 stores and 20 restaurants. The centre opened on 14 October 1998 and is located near the junction of the M50 motorway and N4 road closely surrounded by Lucan to the west, Palmerstown Village to the east and Clondalkin to the south. The centre was a scaled-down replacement for a much larger complex once mooted for the site, known as Quarryvale, the development of which was highly controversial.

== Tenants ==
Anchor tenants at the centre are Ireland's largest Marks & Spencer & Boots, Dunnes Stores, and Next. In 2010 large H&M and New Look fashions stores opened in the centre of the mall. The centre is home to Vue Dublin cinemas (formerly Ster Century Dublin). One of the anchor tenants at the time of opening was Ireland's only branch of C&A, which closed when the parent firm exited the UK market. This unit was taken by Dunnes Stores.

An associated retail park, The Retail Park, Liffey Valley, is nearby, with several warehouse-style stores; these include McDonald's, MaxiZoo, Dreams, DID Electrical, The Range, Jysk, Sports Direct, Costa Coffee, and Currys.

== Renovations ==
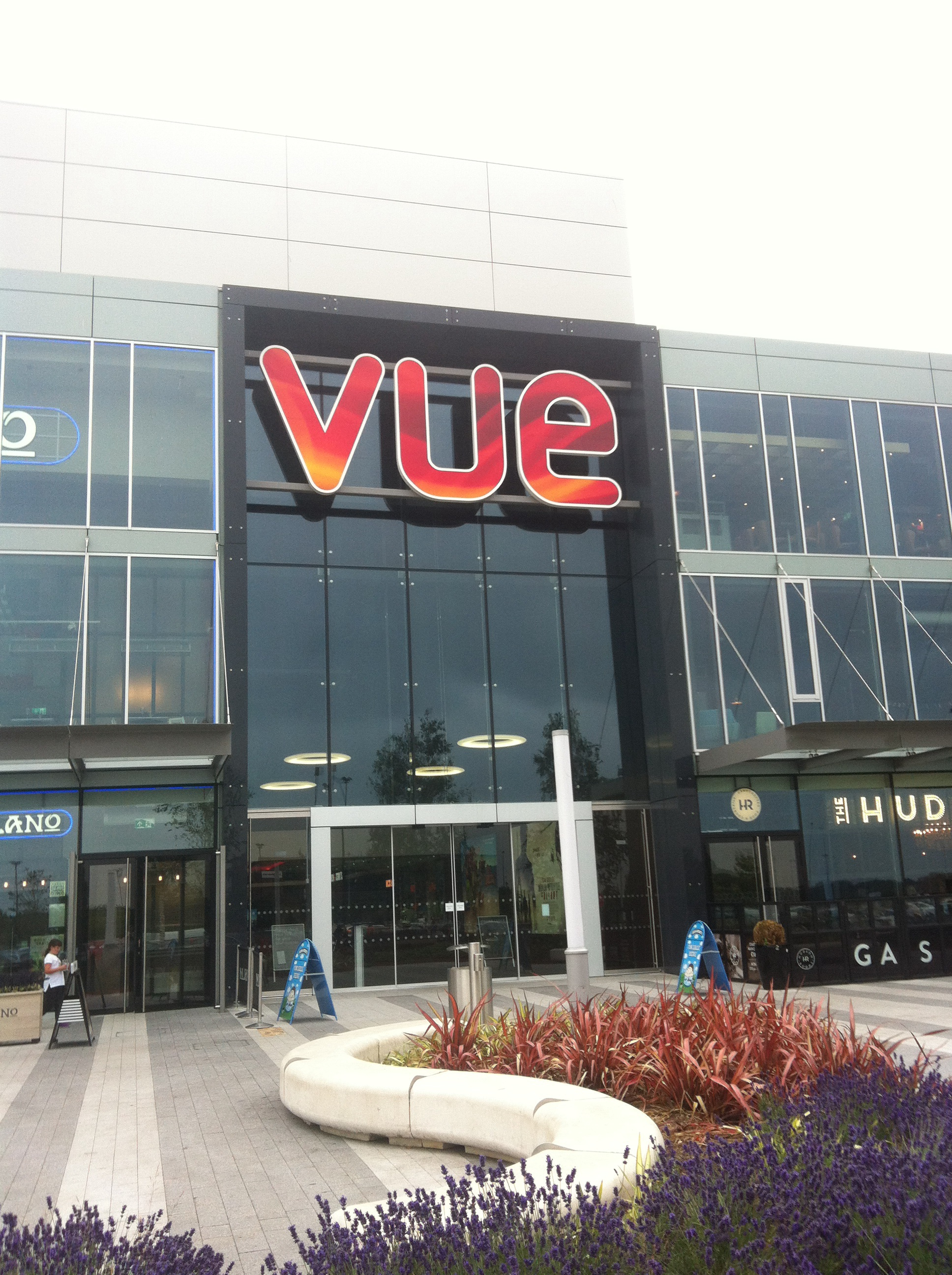
The front promenade of Liffey Valley post-renovation

In February 2015, Liffey Valley announced that it was to begin a €26 million expansion of the shopping centre. The expansion had brought six new restaurants to the shopping centre including Prezzo and TGI Fridays, as well as expanding the Vue cinema and building a new Penneys which opened on 6 December 2016. Tesco opened in the summer of 2018, and was expected to create 450 new jobs.

The construction of the Penneys Store marked the first new store opening in a decade, leading the branch at Liffey Valley to be more modernized, incorporating an Insomnia cafe within the confines of the shop. The general extensions at Liffey Valley attracted significant media interest, and have rejuvenated the local economy. Further extensions were refused planning permission by An Bord Pleanala as they would be detrimental to traffic congestion.

In April 2020 property group Hines submitted a €135 million plan for a major extension to the Liffey Valley Centre in Dublin. The mixed leisure, entertainment and retail extension will include a large public plaza, and creating a new east-west street at the centre. There will also be two large retail units on either side of the plaza.

A new TK Maxx has been built beside the new entrance beside Penneys and opened in 2021.

== Transport ==
Liffey Valley Shopping Centre is served by Dublin Bus routes C1, C2, C3, C4, C5, C6, P29, L53, X25, X26, X27, X28, X30, X31, X32, 80, G2, and Go-Ahead Ireland routes L51, S4, W2 and W4.

On the 19th of February 2023, a brand new "Bus Plaza" opened serving routes G2, L51, L53, and former routes 26, 76 and 76a. It is located 100 feet from the front entrance of the shopping centre and is part of the BusConnects programme.

Note that the C-spine routes, P29, X routes and W4 do not operate to the shopping centre building, but rather to stops on the N4 dual carriageway which is linked to the shopping centre via a footbridge.

== Planning impropriety ==
For two decades an actual "town centre" had been planned in a central location to serve the Lucan, Clondalkin and Palmerstown areas. But Liffey Valley was built to the northeastern extremity of the area it was originally planned to serve. This meant, as noted by Jerry Barnes, chairman of the Royal Town Planning Institute, that the residents of Lucan, Clondalkin and Palmerstown "have been left for 20 years without an appropriately centrally located town centre which is easily accessible to all. This has very serious long-term implications for thousands of people".

Thirty Dublin councillors were investigated by the Mahon Tribunal over allegations about accepting bribes relating to the rezoning of land in Quarryvale. Seán Ardagh was named in the tribunal's report as having received contributions from lobbyist Frank Dunlop and developer Owen O'Callaghan, and the report names other councillors as "hopelessly compromised" due to their associations with the project.

== Reviews ==
- TripAdvisor reviews
