= Power City =

Power City may refer to:

- PowerCity (an electrical retail business in Ireland)
- Global City (the concept of a city that serves as a primary node in the global economic network)
