= Transit signal priority =

Faster mass transit at intersections

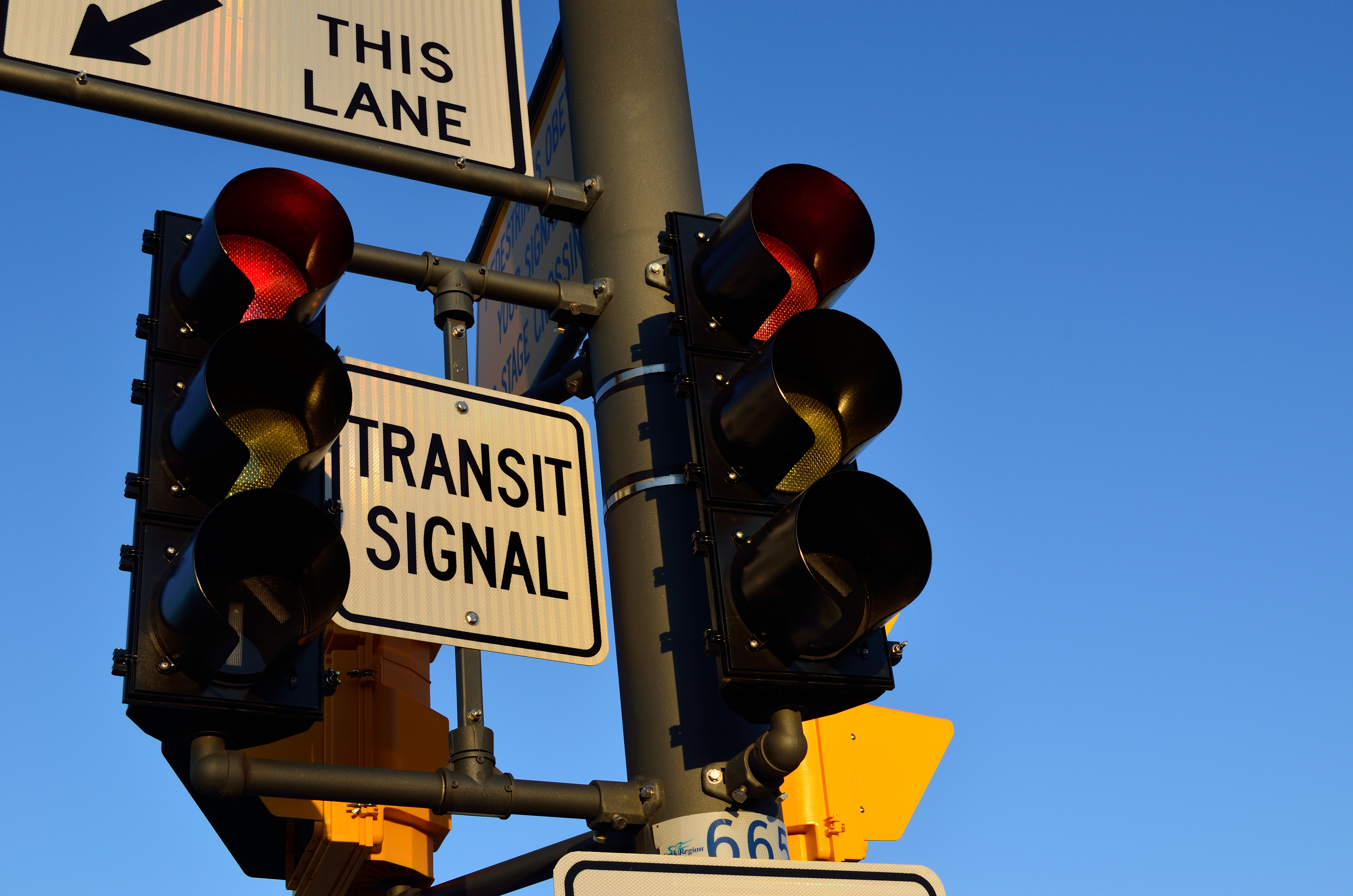
A transit signal traffic light in a bus priority system in Toronto

Transit signal priority (TSP) or bus priority signal is a name for various techniques to improve service and reduce delay for mass transit vehicles at intersections (or junctions) controlled by traffic signals. TSP techniques are most commonly associated with buses, but can also be used along tram/streetcar or light rail lines, especially those that mix with or conflict with general vehicular traffic.

== Techniques ==
Transit signal priority techniques can generally be classified as "active" or "passive". Passive TSP techniques typically involve optimizing signal timing or coordinating successive signals to create a “green wave” for traffic along the transit line's route. Passive techniques require no specialized hardware (such as bus detectors and specialized traffic signal controllers) and rely on simply improving traffic for all vehicles along the transit vehicle's route.

Active TSP techniques rely on detecting transit vehicles as they approach an intersection and adjusting the signal timing dynamically to improve service for the transit vehicle. Unlike passive techniques, active TSP requires specialized hardware: the detection system typically involves a transmitter on the transit vehicle and one or more receivers (detectors), and the signal controller must be “TSP capable”, i.e. sophisticated enough to perform the required timing adjustments. Active strategies include:

Green Extension
This strategy is used to extend the green interval by up to a preset maximum value if a transit vehicle is approaching. Detectors are located so that any transit vehicle that would just miss the green light ("just" meaning by no more than the specified maximum green extension time) extends the green and is able to clear the intersection rather than waiting through an entire red interval cycle. Green Extension provides a benefit to a relatively small percentage of buses (only buses that arrive during a short window each cycle benefit), but the reduction in delay for those buses that do benefit is large (an entire red interval).
Early Green (or Red Truncation)
This strategy is used to shorten the conflicting phases whenever a bus arrives at a red light in order to return to the bus's phase sooner. The conflicting phases are not ended immediately like they are for emergency vehicle preemption systems but are shortened by a predetermined amount. Early green benefits a large portion of buses (any bus that arrives at a red light) but provides a relatively modest benefit to those buses. Early green can be combined with green extension at the same intersection to increase the average benefits for transit.
Early Red
If a transit vehicle is approaching during a green interval, but is far enough away that the light would change to red by the time it arrives, the green interval is ended early and the conflicting phases are served. The signal can then return to the transit vehicle's phase sooner than it otherwise would. Early red is largely theoretical and is not commonly used in practice.
Phase Rotation
The order of phases at the intersection can be shuffled so that transit vehicles arrive during the phase they need. For example, it is common for traffic controllers to give protected left turn phases followed by the adjacent through phases ("leading lefts"); however, this order can be reversed so that the through phases are followed by protected lefts ("lagging lefts"). A signal with phase rotation enabled could switch from its normal leading left operation to a lagging left sequence if a left-turning bus is expected to arrive after the normally scheduled leading left phase would end.
Actuated Transit Phases
These are phases that are only called if a transit vehicle is present. These might be seen along streetcar lines or on dedicated bus lanes. They could also be used where transit vehicles are allowed to make movements that general traffic is not (“No Left Turn Except Buses”) or at the entrances and exits to transit hubs (e.g. bus stations). Transit signal faces often look different from a standard green/yellow/red face to avoid confusion with the signals for general traffic. For example, bus traffic signals may show a letter "B" while trams and Light Rail Vehicles may show a letter "T".
Phase Insertion
This strategy allows a signal controller to return to a critical phase more than once in the same cycle if transit vehicles that use that phase are detected. For example, if a left-turning bus arrives at an intersection after the left turn phase has been served, the signal can insert a second left turn phase before proceeding to serve the side street.

== See also ==
- Bus lane
- Quality Bus Corridor
- Bus rapid transit
- Transport divide
- Traffic engineering (transportation)
- Traffic signal preemption
