= Frank Twomey =

Irish television personality

- Born: 1954 or 1955; Cork, Ireland
- Died: 11 December 2023 (aged 68); Cork, Ireland
- Notable work: Bosco
- Television: Bosco; Bull Island

Frank Twomey (1954 or 1955 – 11 December 2023) was an Irish children's show host, best known as the main host of the children's television programme Bosco.

== Career ==
Other than the one in Bosco, his lesser-known credits include other screen appearances and appearances on stage.

Twomey went on to appear on Bull Island, particularly as Mary O'Rourke, the then Minister for Public Enterprise.

Twomey later featured on the advice show Agony OAPs, with retired footballer Pat Spillane and retired politician Mary O'Rourke, whom he impersonated on Bull Island.

== Personal life and death ==
Twomey was openly gay, though this was not reflected on his show, Bosco, at which time it was illegal, "but it didn't stop me from being gay. It meant that I was careful and I was very discrete because I had a government job", he said later.

Twomey died from lung disease in Cork on 11 December 2023, at the age of 68.
