= BusConnects =

Public transport programme in Ireland

The BusConnects logo as of 2026

BusConnects is an ongoing public transport infrastructure programme in Ireland, managed by the National Transport Authority (NTA), focused on the bus networks in several cities in the country. Described by the NTA as intended to "improve bus services across the country", as of mid-2022 the programme was in "implementation" phase in Dublin, "consultation" phase in Cork, with the Minister for Transport projecting similar initiatives in Galway, Limerick and Waterford. Aspects of the plans have proven controversial with local politicians, residents, and unions in both Dublin and Cork.

== Background ==
BusConnects was announced by then-Minister for Transport Shane Ross in May 2017, with the intention of increasing bus use in Dublin city by 50%. The intended network of "next generation" bus corridors were originally scheduled for completion by 2027; however, by 2022 the Government had pushed the end date back to 2030. Initially estimated to cost around €1 billion, the project is now expected to cost between €2.6bn and €3.37bn by the time it is completed in 2030.

In 2017, a report commissioned by the NTA and produced by US-based consulting firm Jarrett Walker + Associates (previously involved in similar projects in New Zealand), set out a number of options for the redesign of Dublin's bus transport network. The proposed purpose of the redesign was to improve network functionality and increase bus ridership in the Dublin area. The report noted that the existing network focused on radial routes (from the suburbs into the city centre) and had very few orbital or crossing routes (from suburb to suburb). Arising from this report, an initial network proposal was released for public consultation in mid-2018. According to Newstalk, BusConnects designer Jarrett Walker described the Dublin project as "the most politically charged he'd ever been involved with." 72,000 submissions were lodged by the Irish public during the various stages of public consultation prior to the beginning of BusConnects.

According to a press release issued by the Department of Transport in March 2022, it was noted that, while a "final budget and delivery schedule for BusConnects Dublin" had not been established, the proposed budget was then projected to be €4 billion and work speculated to "be substantially complete by 2030". In promotional material from March 2026, the aims of the BusConnects project in Dublin were described thus:

BusConnects is designed to connect more people to more places through an enhanced bus system, via integration with other public transport initiatives that links communities to the city centre. Alongside improved cycling and pedestrian facilities across Dublin, BusConnects aims to enhance pedestrians' quality of life by delivering a safer and more sustainable transport system.

A bi-annual report is published, which updates on the progress of the BusConnects project in Ireland. The most recent Progress Report was released in September 2026.

== Initiatives ==
=== Dublin ===
The BusConnects programme in Dublin was split into phases, for which the main consultation initiatives concluded in 2020. The NTA began implementing the new network in stages, starting in 2021. These included:

- Phase 1 (H-Spine) - initially rolled out in June 2021, when routes 29a, 31/a/b and 32 were replaced by routes H1, H2 and H3.
- Phase 2 (C-Spine) - launched in November 2021 in West Dublin and East Kildare, this involved the introduction of several routes operated by Dublin Bus and Go-Ahead Ireland, including the C-Spine (C1, C2, C3, C4), route 52, a number of peak-only and local routes and two night-time routes.
- Phase 3 (N-Orbital) - launched in May 2022 with the N4 and N6 north Dublin orbitals.
- Phase 4 (G-Spine) - launched in October 2022 with routes G1, G2 and 60.
- Phase 5a (W-Orbital) - launched in June 2023 with routes W4, W61 and W62.
- Phase 5b - launched in November 2023 with routes S2, S4, S6, S8, W2, 74, L25, and L55. Following this change, routes 17, 17D, 18, 75, 75A, 76, 76A, 175, operated by Go-Ahead Ireland and 61, operated by Dublin Bus ceased operations.
- Phase 6a (E-spine) - launched in September 2024 with the northside orbital route of the N2, and concluded in January 2025 with the launch of new routes, and renaming of other existing ones (including the 46a).
- Phase 7 (F-spine) - launched in October 2025 with numerous routes, including the number 80 running from Chapelizod to the city centre. Following complaints from customers, the NTA announced in November 2025 that they would change the routes of the numbers 23, 24 and 80 from February 2026 onwards.

During both the implementation and consultation phases, the BusConnects projects in Dublin attracted significant controversy and criticism, including from service users, residents, politicians, and transport unions. As of 2022, concerns included route coverage, total journey times, allowing for route access and changes, actual performance and "no shows", property "taking" required to implement routes, and reduction in road space for existing commuter traffic. Similar sentiments were expressed in Ballyfermot that same year.

In November 2024, members of the Bluebell and Inchicore communities began protesting against planned BusConnects route changes in their area which they believed would result in less bus frequency and connectivity. The monthly protests were led by Right to Change politician Joan Collins, and were still taking place as of May 2025.

Molly Cantwell, writing for Newstalk in February 2025 questioned whether the roll out of Busconnects had contributed to the rising issue of 'ghost buses' across Ireland (buses which appear on digital display boards but then disappear from the boards without a bus showing up). Dublin Bus CEO Billy Hann replied that "When we're changing routes or bringing in a new spine or a new local area and network, you'll always get some complaints, because some people are not getting the service that they feel that they once had (..) But by and large, it's still producing 25% extra connectivity to the greater Dublin area."

In March 2025, RTÉ News recorded that there was "a 48% increase in the number of passenger boardings in areas of Dublin where new BusConnnects routes are operating compared to the rest of the bus network", but that there was still significant room for improvement with regards to the punctuality of the new services.

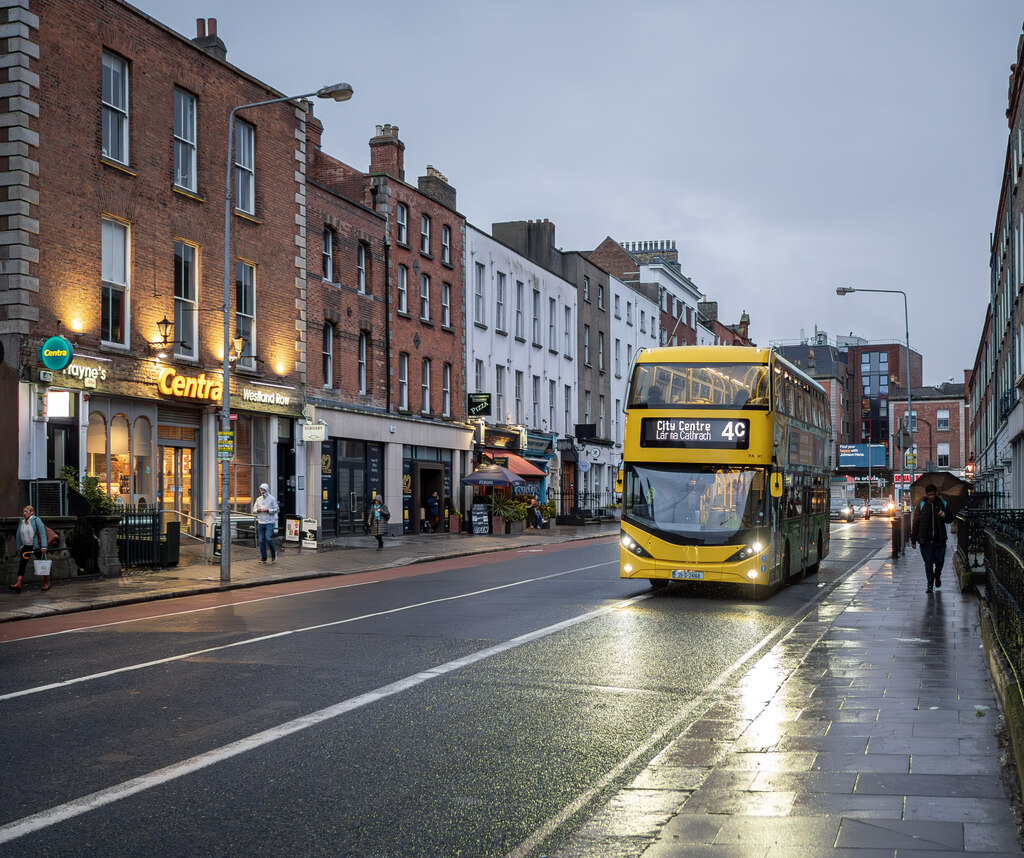
A bus on Westland Row, Dublin

Speaking in August 2025, a University College Dublin student who routinely took the route S6 bus to university told the Dublin Inquirer that service on the route had "gotten a lot worse" since the S6 had replaced the 175 as part of BusConnects. Other UCD students, a professor, and another teacher who regularly took the bus echoed the comments. The S6 was noted as being the route most reported on 'noshowbus.ie', a website launched in October 2024 with the aim of collecting reports of ghost buses and cancelled buses in Dublin.

The launch of Phase 7 (the F-spine) in October 2025, was met with criticism from politicians and affected passengers alike, with Fianna Fáil TD Paul McAuliffe labelling the roll out "absolutely calamitous", and a number of protests held in the suburbs of Finglas and Chapelizod due to "ongoing reliability issues" with some of the routes in the weeks following the launch. The protests concerned the new alignments of routes 23, 24 and 80, which impacted journey times due to high levels of traffic congestion, and also the reduced dependability of the routes owing to the wider BusConnects issue of driver availability cancelling services. The protests called for the previous bus services to be restored. The NTA announced a series of amendments to the problematic routes, which took effect from 8 February 2026. Concerning the changes, Jeremy Ryan, the NTA's director of public transport services said "These amendments are a direct response to customer and community feedback (..) We will continue to monitor the performance of these routes closely and make further adjustments where necessary to ensure passengers experience a more dependable service."

==== 12 Core Bus Corridor Schemes ====
BusConnects incorporates the Core Bus Corridors' (CBC) Project, which aims to construct approximately 230 kilometres of dedicated bus lanes, and 200 kilometres of cycle tracks across 12 separate schemes across Dublin city. Not only focused on bus lanes, the project involves "the development of continuous bus priority infrastructure and improved pedestrian and cycling facilities on key radial corridors across the Dublin region."

In January 2026, the Irish Independent noted that the first BusConnects corridor in the scheme, from the city centre to Liffey Valley, was "due to begin construction shortly", with the contract having been awarded to GMC Group in July 2025. Work was underway as of August 2026.

The second corridor scheme, the Ballymun/Finglas to city centre corridor, "for which site investigations began" in December 2025, is expected to go into construction by summer 2026. The corridor will incorporate "interchange opportunities" with the Luas tram at Broombridge, and the planned MetroLink station expected to be constructed at Griffith Park.

In February 2026, locals in the suburb of Cabra in support of the proposed Blanchardstown-to-city centre BusConnects corridor, gathered to protest against a petrol station whose owner had brought a judicial review against BusConnects trying to stop the corridor.

==== Future plans ====
In the suburb of Tyrrelstown, where current (pre-BusConnects) bus services have been found to be erratic and undependable, new BusConnects routes expected in 2027 are planned to bring a better service for passengers. The Dublin Inquirer notes that "Although the buses will be scheduled to run more frequently (..), there's no knowing if the new buses will be more reliable, or punctual, of course." Initially expected in 2025, and now pushed back to 2027, residents in Tyrrelstown are aware that the expected BusConnects improvements are coming, but "they keep getting delayed".

In 2027, the NTA plan to join the routes 80 and 130 together, in order to form one "single cross‑city service" from Liffey Valley to Clontarf.

=== Cork ===
The consultation phase for the proposed BusConnects project in Cork was opened in 2022. The published proposals attracted significant controversy and complaint from home-owners, politicians, transport unions, and other stakeholders. According to reports from mid-2022, concerns were raised in particular about the proposed demolition of old stone walls, the potential for nearly 1000 properties to lose parts of their gardens through compulsory purchase orders, the loss of sections of Ballybrack Woods in Douglas, and the felling of 1,400 mature trees along proposed routes.

Buses on St Patrick's Street, Cork

As of mid-2024, approximately €24m had been spent on proposed BusConnects initiatives in Cork, including at least €2.5 million on consultation efforts. By August 2025, approximately €54 million had been spent, "before a sod ha(d) (even) been turned on the plan". While planning applications were due to be submitted "on a phased basis beginning in the first quarter of 2025", by the end of 2025 it was suggested that the applications would not be lodged until 2026.

A phased rollout of the Cork Metropolitan bus network redesign is scheduled to commence from 2027. BusConnects Cork intends to implement full electrification of its Cork bus fleet by 2034 in order to modernise operations, reduce emissions, and improve air quality in the city. Charging infrastructure will also be installed at the Capwell bus depot, supported by a temporary depot at Tivoli, which was noted as being substantially complete as of May 2026.

=== Limerick ===
In February 2023, the National Transport Authority published a draft version of a new bus network for Limerick city. While, at that time, the network redesign was intended to be rolled out during 2025, reports from April 2025 indicated that the changes would not be rolled-out until at least 2027.

=== Galway ===
As of late 2024, some of the proposed BusConnects initiatives in Galway were subject to a High Court challenge, with opponents stating that the plan to close the "central corridor of the city [..] at peak hours using a system of timed bus gates and bus lanes" would divert traffic elsewhere and that the NTA and Galway City Council had proposed "no mitigation" for the "adverse impact of the increased traffic" on those roads. By October 2026, three of these challenges had been settled by the High Court, with a fourth expected to be heard in November 2026.

The redesigned bus network of Galway is expected to increase current services by approximately 50%, expand coverage, and introduce a new 24-hour route. Planning approval was granted in March 2026 for electrification of the Bus Éireann depot at New Docks beside Lough Atalia. This included the installation of 70 charging points, as well as the introduction of 42 electric buses which are "expected to be in operation by early 2027."

=== Waterford ===
Bus stop in Waterford

In February 2026, councillors in Waterford Council expressed doubts over when exactly the proposed BusConnects programme in the city would be delivered. Councillor Declan Barry noted that they had been told in 2025 that BusConnects routes would be delivered by 2026, and have been subsequently told that the "delivery ha(s) been pushed to 2027." Waterford Council Director of Services, Gabriel Hynes, assured councillors that senior Council staff were due to meet with the NTA in the coming weeks and that the "delivery of BusConnects in Waterford" was on the agenda.

=== Other cities ===
In March 2022, the then Minister of Transport proposed "acceleration" and a rollout of BusConnects initiatives to Galway, Limerick and Waterford.

== Progression ==
At the end of September 2026, the National Transport Authority published its biannual Progress Report which noted that the "BusConnects Programme continues to make strong progress, with delivery momentum accelerating across all projects."

== Countrywide appraisal ==
Speaking in the Dáil in January 2026, People Before Profit–Solidarity politician Deputy Richard Boyd Barrett opined that "BusConnects is a shambles" and that the project, which the National Transport Authority initiated to improve bus services in Irish cities, has "added stress to the lives of daily commuters and bus drivers alike":

"Late buses, ghost buses, cancelled buses, buses that go past you because they're packed at peak hours, areas that have been completely abandoned, BusConnects is a shambles. Drivers are stressed to bits with the press-it box system, being harassed and being disciplined because they can't meet unrealistic routes and timetable requirements. It is a shambles for commuters trying to get to work, for older people, for disabled people, for students and for bus drivers who are harassed to bits and then all of that compounded with the privatisation of the system, with apps that tell different information. So if you go on the Transport for Ireland app, it tells you one thing, you go to bustimes.org, it tells you something else, and reality tells you something else again. It's absolute chaos."

Boyd Barrett noted that some of the worst offending routes for 'ghost buses' occurring were on the E-Spine and F-Spine routes, and commented that his colleague Councillor Conor Reddy from Finglas, "received 350 emails of complaint regarding the F Spine service in its first week." People Before Profit-Solidarity politician Deputy Paul Murphy added that he has heard complaints that the commuter duration of journeys had increased since the F-Spine was introduced, and noted that the S-6 route "has so many issues it has been granted its own Instagram page, where users of the service gather to complain and share their experiences." Fine Gael's Jerry Buttimer replied that the issues raised "highlights the importance of the need for BusConnects to be complete." Buttimer said that "public transport and connectivity is key to revitalising villages, towns and urban centres and that BusConnect has already seen success, aside from the issues raised..."

== See also ==
- Public transport in Ireland
- Quality Bus Corridor

== Sources ==
- Progress Report (24 September 2026). "BusConnects Progress Report 2026". nationaltransport.ie. National Transport Authority.
