= Bus lane =

Road lane intended for buses and other transits only

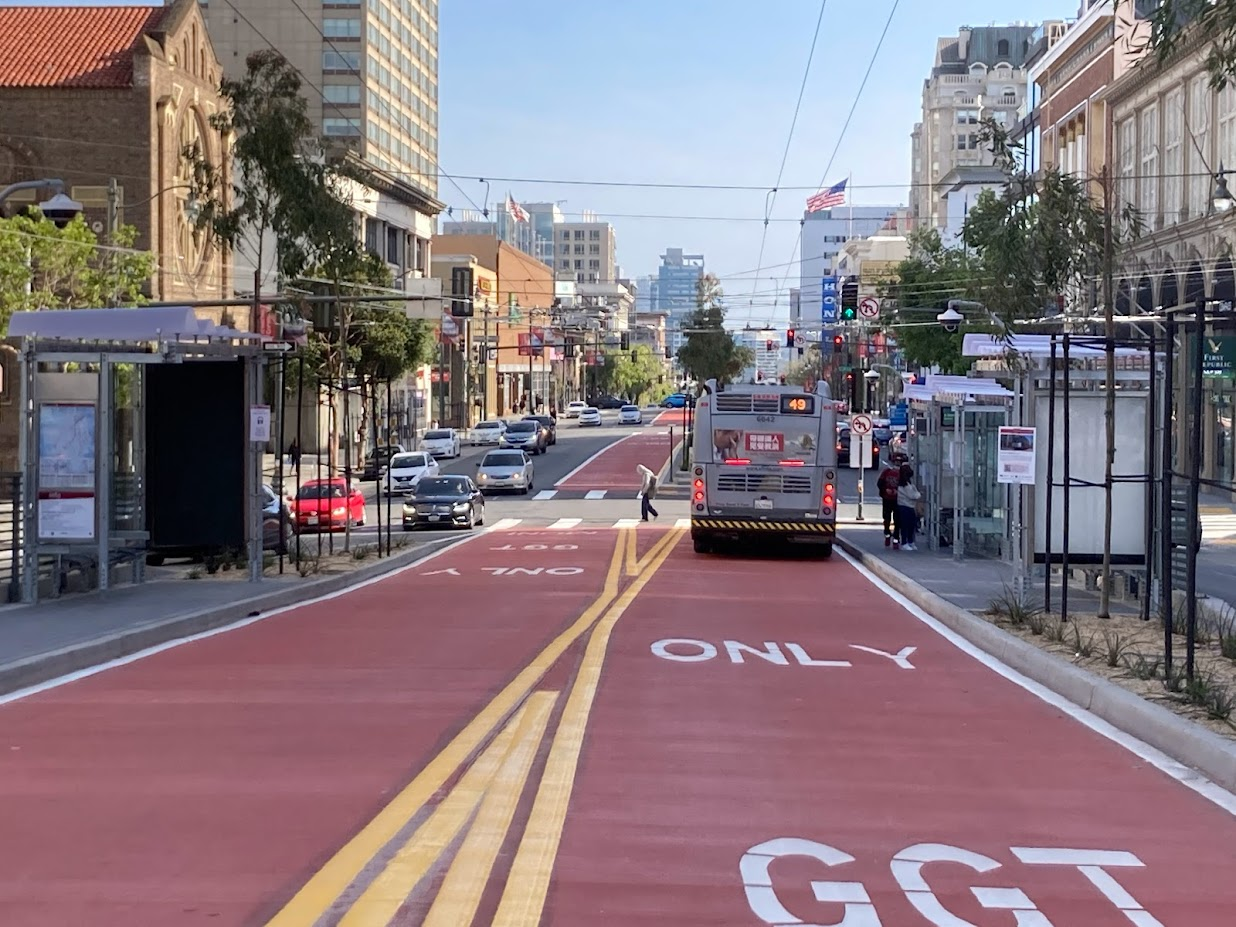
Van Ness Bus Rapid Transit bus lane in San Francisco, California

Select Bus Service bus lane on Nostrand Avenue in Brooklyn, New York

A bus lane or bus-only lane is a lane restricted to buses, generally to speed up public transport that would be otherwise held up by traffic congestion. The related term busway describes a roadway completely dedicated for use by buses, whilst bus gate describes a short bus lane often used as a short cut for public transport. Bus lanes are a key component of a high-quality bus corridor (QBC) and bus rapid transit (BRT) network, improving bus travel speeds and reliability by reducing delay caused by other traffic.

A dedicated bus lane may occupy only part of a roadway which also has lanes serving general automotive traffic; in contrast to a transit mall which is a pedestrianized roadway also served by transit.

== History ==
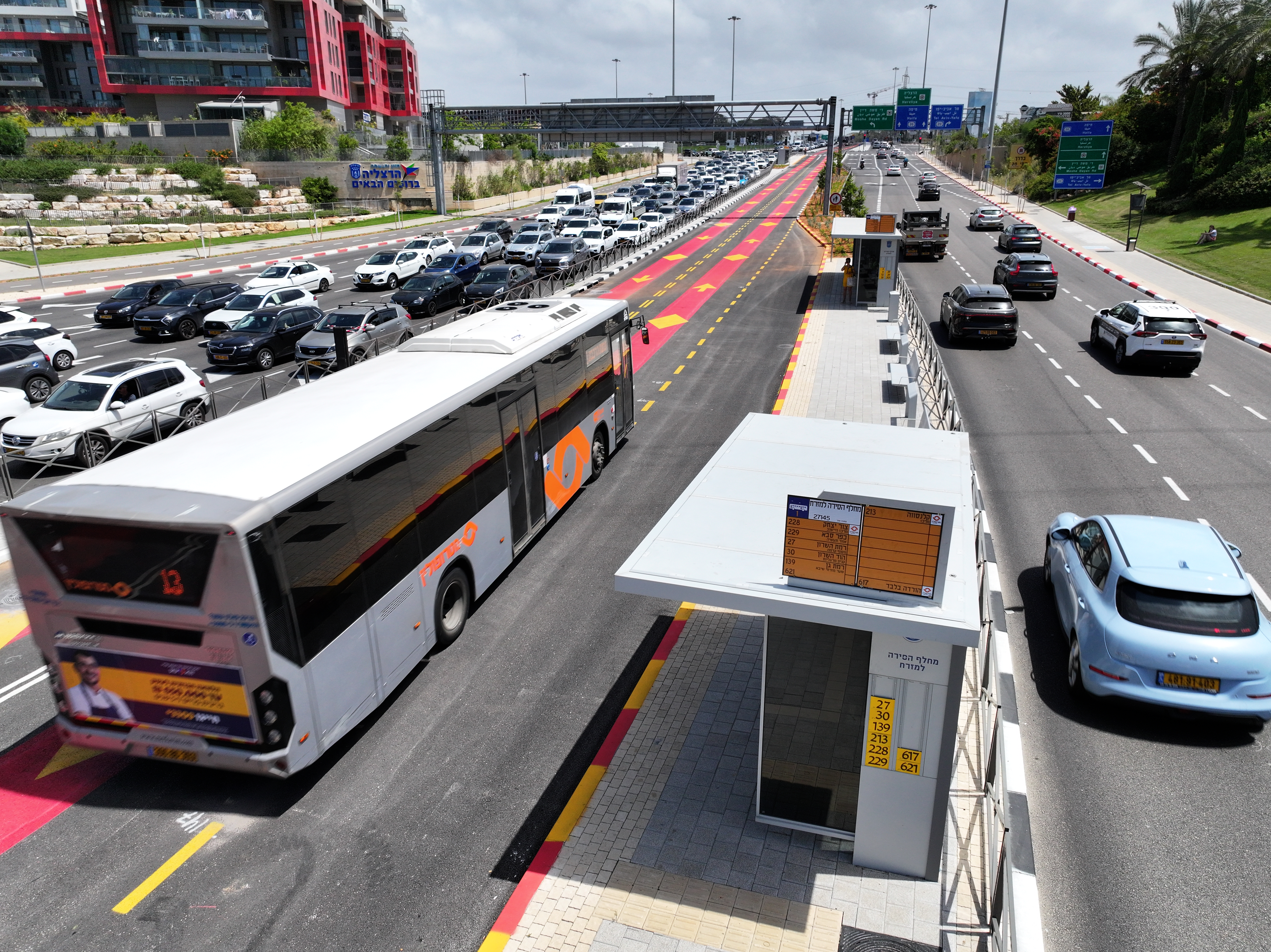
Dedicated bus lanes in Herzliya, Israel. The bus lanes allow the buses to avoid congested roads.

The first bus lane is often erroneously attributed to Chicago, where in 1939 Sheridan Road was installed with reversible lanes north of Foster Avenue. The setup consisted of three-lanes towards the peak direction (south in the morning; north in the evening), and one contraflow lane. None of the lanes exclusively carried buses, but were designed to facilitate bus operations. In 1948, the East Side Trolley Tunnel in Providence, Rhode Island was converted to bus-only use and became the first dedicated busway in the United States, continuing to operate to this day. In 1956 Nashville became the first city to implement on-street bus lanes. Later that year, Chicago implemented a bus lane in the center of Washington Street, a five lane one-way street downtown.

The first bus lanes in Europe were established before October 1962 when, at the creation of the UK's first contraflow bus lane, London Transport "welcomed the special bus lane idea, which is in wide use on the Continent and America". An article in August 1963 identified Hamburg, Milan and Rome as having them, with Milan having 2 miles 750 yards. Most of the lanes were with-flow, but some of the lanes in Milan and all those in Rome were contraflow.

In 1963 the tram system in Hamburg was closed and the former dedicated tram tracks were converted for bus travel. Other large German cities soon followed, and the implementation of bus lanes was officially sanctioned in the German highway code in 1970. Many experts from other countries (Japan among the first) studied the German example and implemented similar solutions. On 15 January 1964 the first bus lane in France was designated along the Quai du Louvre in Paris and the first contraflow lane was established on the old Pont de l’Alma on 15 June 1966.

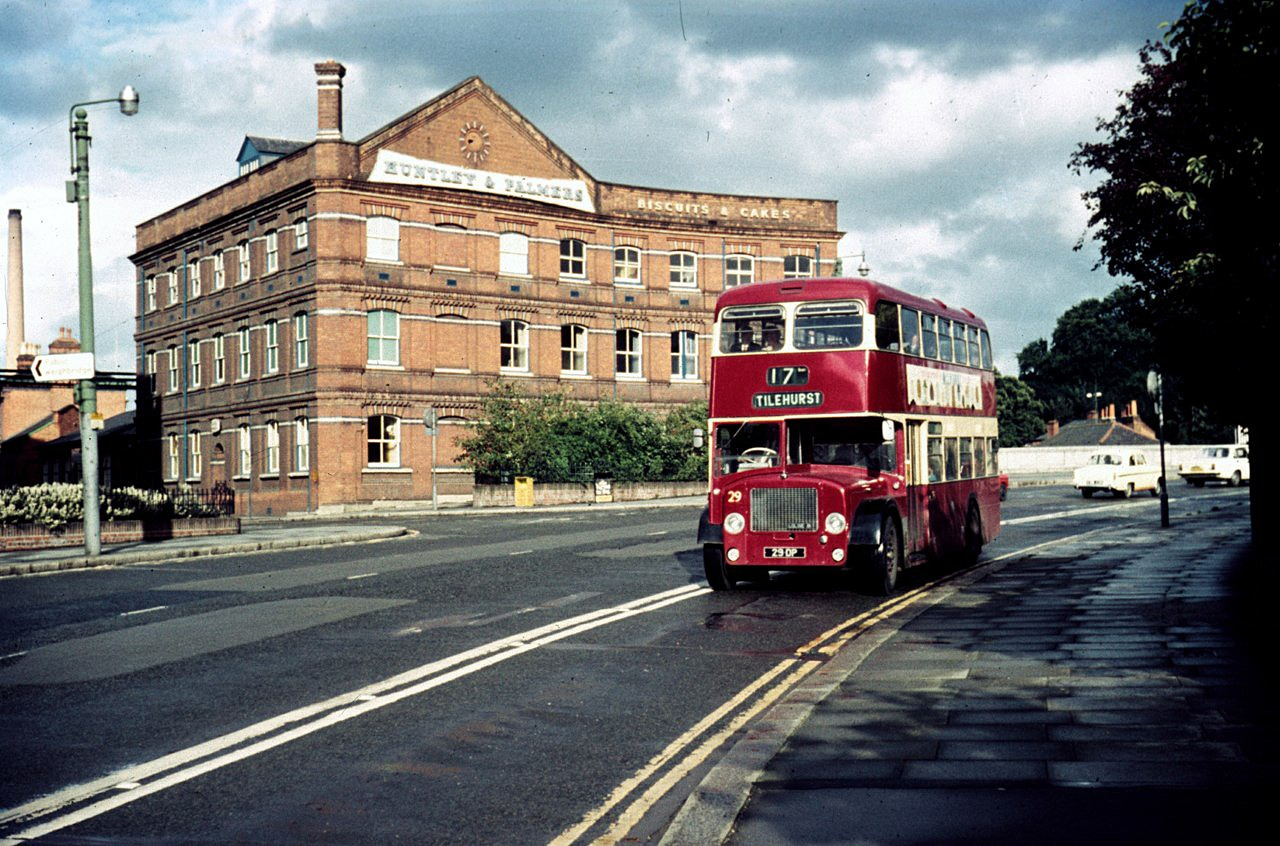
First substantial British contraflow bus lane in use, King's Road, Reading – 1971

The first contraflow bus lane in the UK was created in 1962 in London: a 50m-long section of Berkeley Street was made bus-only northbound while unrestricted southbound. A bus gate was created in 1964 as part of a one-way scheme between Vauxhall Bridge and Victoria, London. On 26 February 1968 the first with-flow bus lanes were put into service on Park Lane and Vauxhall Bridge in London. They applied from 4 p.m. - 7 p.m., Monday - Friday. In October 1971 Runcorn opened the world's first bus rapid transitway. Upon opening, the 7-mile (11 km) busway featured specialized stations, signal priority, grade separation, and was expanded to 14 miles (23 km) by 1980.

By 1972 there were over 140 kilometres (87 mi) of with-flow bus lanes in 100 cities within OECD member countries, and the network grew substantially in the following decades.

The El Monte Busway between El Monte and Downtown Los Angeles was the first dedicated busway in the US, constructed in 1974.

== Design ==
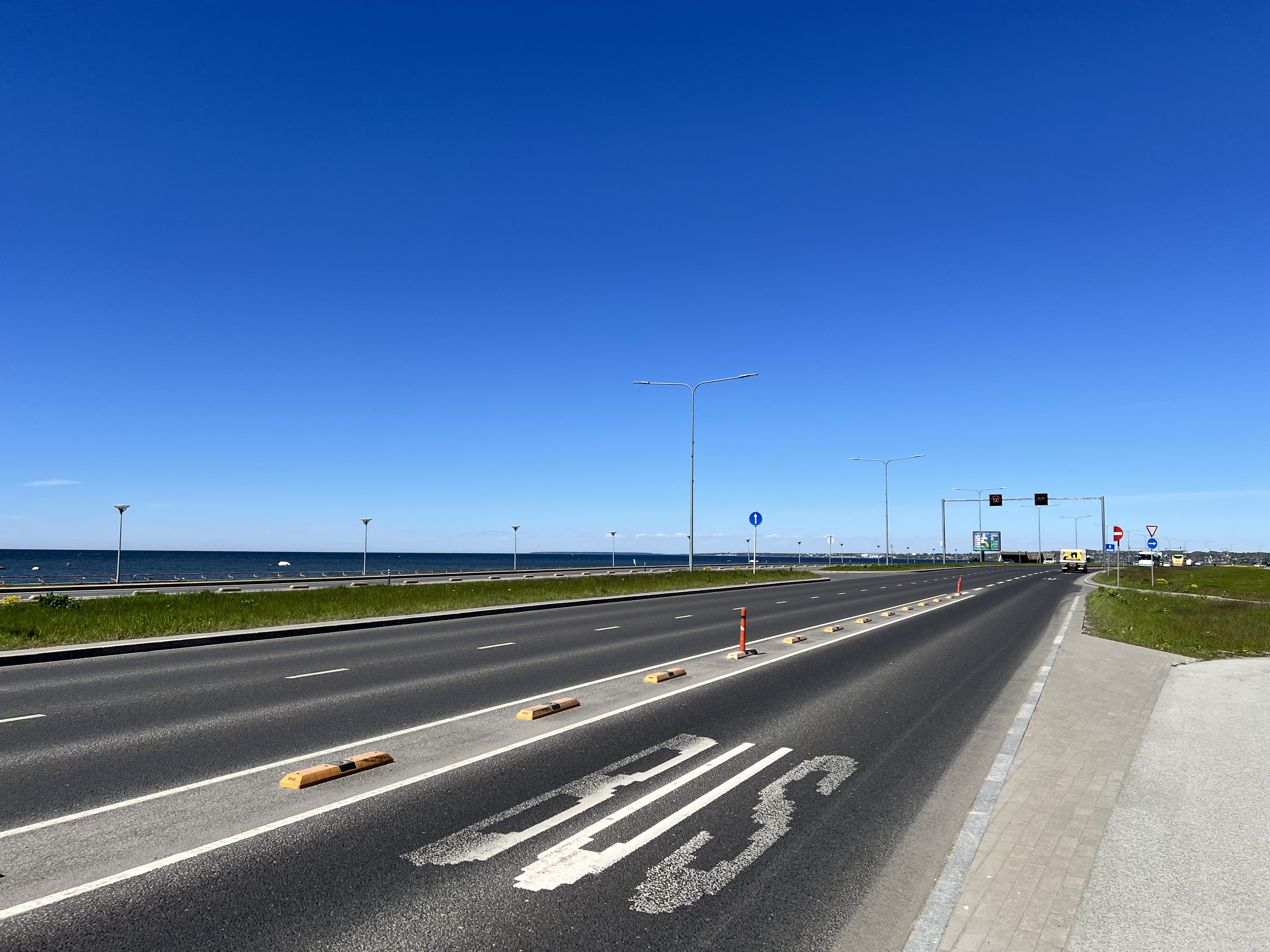
A bus lane in Tallinn separated from general road traffic to avoid congestion

Bus lanes may be located in different locations on a street, such as on the sides of a street near the curb, or down the center. They may be long, continuous networks, or short segments used to allow buses to bypass bottlenecks or reduce route complexity, such as in a contraflow bus lane.

Bus lanes may be demarcated in several ways. Descriptive text such as "BUS LANE" may be marked prominently on the road surface, particularly at the beginning and end. Some cities use a diamond-shaped pavement marking to indicate an exclusive bus lane. The road surface may have a distinctive color, usually red, which has been shown to reduce prohibited vehicles from entering bus lanes. Road signs may communicate when a bus lane is in effect.

Bus lanes may also be physically separated from other traffic using bollards, curbs, or other raised elements.

In some cities, such as The Hague in the Netherlands, buses are allowed to use reserved tram tracks, usually laid in the middle of the road and marked with the text "Lijnbus".

=== Bus gates ===
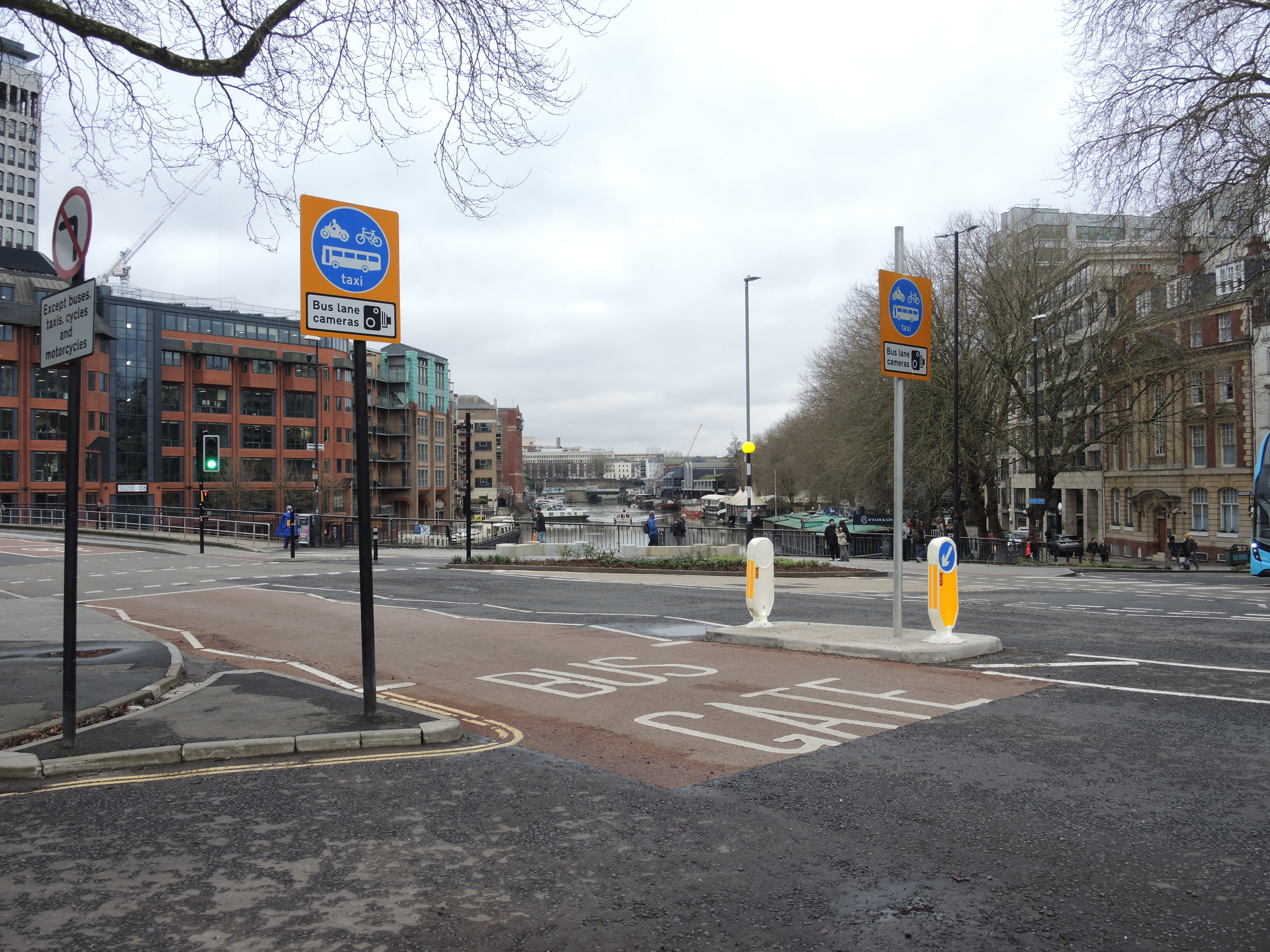
Bus gate in the centre of Bristol, England, 2024

In the United Kingdom bus gates are common in towns and cities. A bus gate consists of a short section of road that only buses, cycles and sometimes other vehicles (typically taxis) can pass through. They lack most of the signage of bus lanes and have the words "BUS GATE" on the carriageway instead of "BUS LANE".

The first bus gate in the UK is from 1964. Buses were allowed to continue along Vauxhall Bridge Road towards Victoria while other traffic was diverted along Bessborough Road and Belgrave Road. A 1967 photograph shows pre-Worboys No Entry signs with "Except Buses" beneath; such signs ceased to be placed after 31 December 1964.

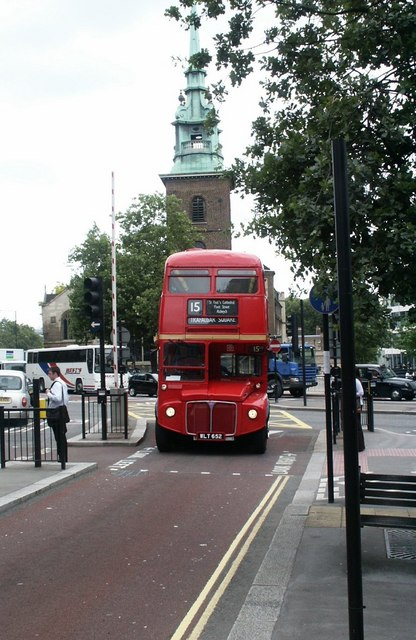
Bus Gate with a red-and-white pole lifted to admit a Routemaster bus, City of London, 2007

Until 2006 (later outside London), penalties for contravening a bus gate involved prosecution, so needed to be witnessed by police or traffic wardens. Some local authorities sought to make bus gates self-enforcing. Several technologies have been used:

- red-and-white pole pivoted at one end ("gates"). These were used from the mid-1970s and are still used at some toll bridges and in car parks;
- rising bollards: these superseded pivoting poles from the mid-1990s. They (and the related sliding bollards) are no longer used at bus gates, but they are used in pedestrian schemes where they only have to change position twice a day;
- traffic lights triggered only by buses (called "bus plugs" in Nottingham, which was the most prominent user);
- CCTV with ANPR and civil enforcement (from 2006 in London; from 2010 outside London).

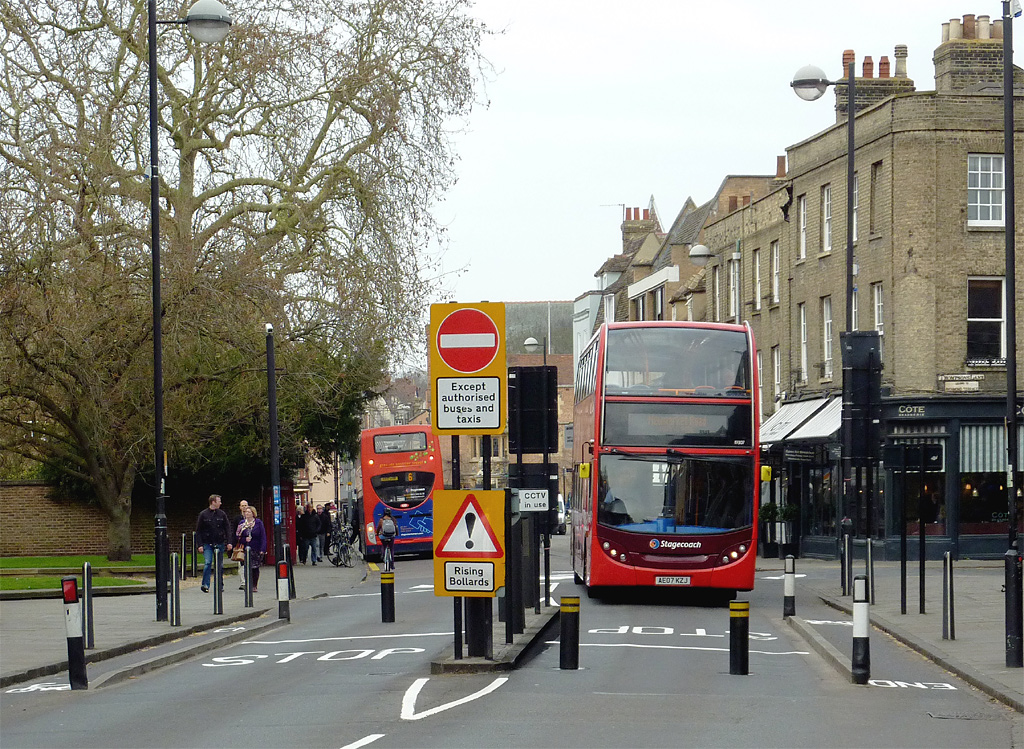
Bus gate with rising bollards in Cambridge, England, 2014

Many motorists are fined for going through bus gates.

== Operation ==
Bus lanes may have separate sets of dedicated traffic signals, to allow transit signal priority at intersections.

Peak-only bus lanes are enforced only at certain times of the day, usually during rush hour, reverting to a general purpose or parking lane at other times. Peak-only bus lanes may be in effect only in the main direction of travel, such as towards a downtown during morning rush hour traffic, with the buses using general purpose lanes in the other direction.

Entire streets can be designated as bus lanes (such as Oxford Street in London, Princes Street in Edinburgh, or Fulton Street in Downtown Brooklyn), allowing buses, taxis and delivery vehicles only, or a contra-flow bus lane can allow buses to travel in the opposite direction to other vehicles.

Some locations allow bicyclists or taxis to use bus lanes, however where bus or bicycle volumes are high, mixed traffic operations may result in uncomfortable conditions or delays. Certain other vehicles may also be permitted in bus lanes, such as taxis, high occupancy vehicles, motorcycles, or bicycles. Police, ambulance services and fire brigades can also use these lanes.

In the Netherlands mixed bus/cycle lanes are uncommon. According to the Sustainable Safety guidelines they would violate the principle of homogeneity and put road users of very different masses and speed behaviour into the same lane, which is generally discouraged.

Some locations have allowed access to bus lanes to electric cars and/or hybrid cars. Oslo removed one such exception in 2017 following protests due to congestion in bus lanes. The large number of electric vehicles on Norwegian roads slowed buses, defeating the purpose of bus lanes.

== Enforcement ==
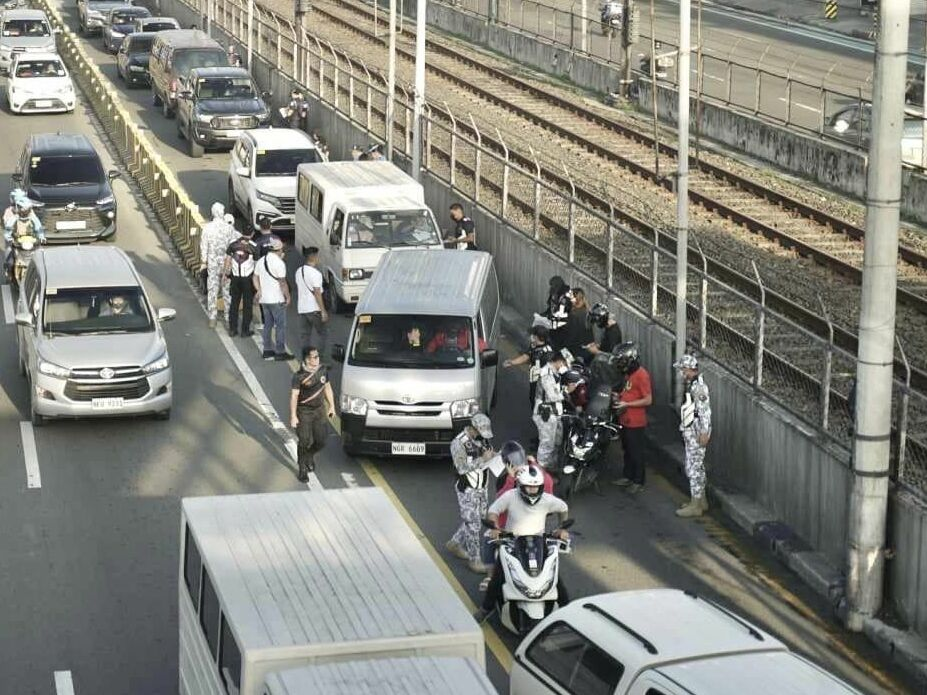
Traffic enforcers in Manila, Philippines, ticketing unauthorized vehicles using the EDSA Busway.

Bus lanes can become ineffective if weak enforcement allows use by unauthorized vehicles or illegal parking. Center-running bus lanes avoid the problem of private vehicles blocking the lane by double parking for loading of passengers or cargo.

Evidence from the operation of urban arterials in Brisbane shows that a properly enforced bus lane, operating as designed without interference, can increase passenger throughput. In 2009 and 2010 traffic surveys showed that in Brisbane on a number of urban arterials with bus and transit lanes, noncompliance rates were approaching 90%. Following enhanced enforcement of the lanes, noncompliance rates dropped and overall efficiency of the bus and transit lanes improved with an up to 12% increase in total passenger throughput in the lane. Average bus journey times dropped, in some cases, by up to 19%.

Some cities, including San Francisco and New York, employ automated camera enforcement, using either stationary cameras adjacent to the bus lane, or cameras on the front of buses to automatically issue citations to vehicles obstructing the bus lane.

== Effectiveness ==
Bus lanes give priority to buses, cutting down on journey times where roads are congested with other traffic and increasing the reliability of buses. The introduction of bus lanes can significantly assist in the reduction of air pollution.

Bus lanes marked with colored pavement have been shown to reduce intrusions into bus lanes, speeding travel time and increasing bus reliability.

== Major networks ==
Some network lengths of bus lanes in major cities, listed by buses per km of bus lane):

City	Country	Population (million)	Buses (#s)	Population per bus	Bus lanes (km)	Buses per 1 km of bus lane
Helsinki	Finland	0.6	470	1,238	44	11
Sydney	Australia	4.3	1,900	2,260	90+	21
Santiago	Chile	6.5	4,600	1,400	200	23
London	England	8.7	8,600	1,010	304	28
Singapore	Singapore	5.5	3,775	1,200	200 (23 km are 24-hour restricted bus lane)	29
Seoul	South Korea	10.4	8,910	1,167	282	32
Madrid	Spain	7	2,022	2,720	50	40
Jakarta	Indonesia	10.1	524	5,000	184.31	30
Bogotá	Colombia	6.7	1,080	6,200	84	13
São Paulo	Brazil	10.9	14,900	730	155	96
Kunming	People's Republic of China	5.7	~	~	42	
Beijing	People's Republic of China	19.6	26,000	754	294	88
Hong Kong	Hong Kong	6.8	19,768	666	22	899
Vienna	Austria	1.8			56	
New York	United States	8.5	5,777	1,480	222.7	26
Auckland	New Zealand	1.6	1,360	1,176	128 (by the end of 2017)	11

Country	Highway	Bus lanes (km)	Section
South Korea	Gyeongbu Expressway	137.4	Hannam IC (Seoul) ~ Sintanjin IC (Daejeon)
Hong Kong	Tuen Mun Road	8.5	So Kwun Wat ~ Sham Tseng

The busiest bus lane in the United States is the Lincoln Tunnel XBL (exclusive bus lane) along the Lincoln Tunnel Approach and Helix in Hudson County, New Jersey, which carries approximately 700 buses per hour during morning peak times an average of one bus every 5.1 seconds. In contrast, the Cross-Harbour Tunnel in Hong Kong carries 14,500 buses per day, or an average of about 605 an hour all day (not just peak times), but the bus lane must give way to all the other road users resulting in long queues of buses.

== Criticism ==
Some residents and observers criticize bus lane plans and implementations because they take space from other vehicles or require road widening, which can require the use of eminent domain.

== Gallery ==
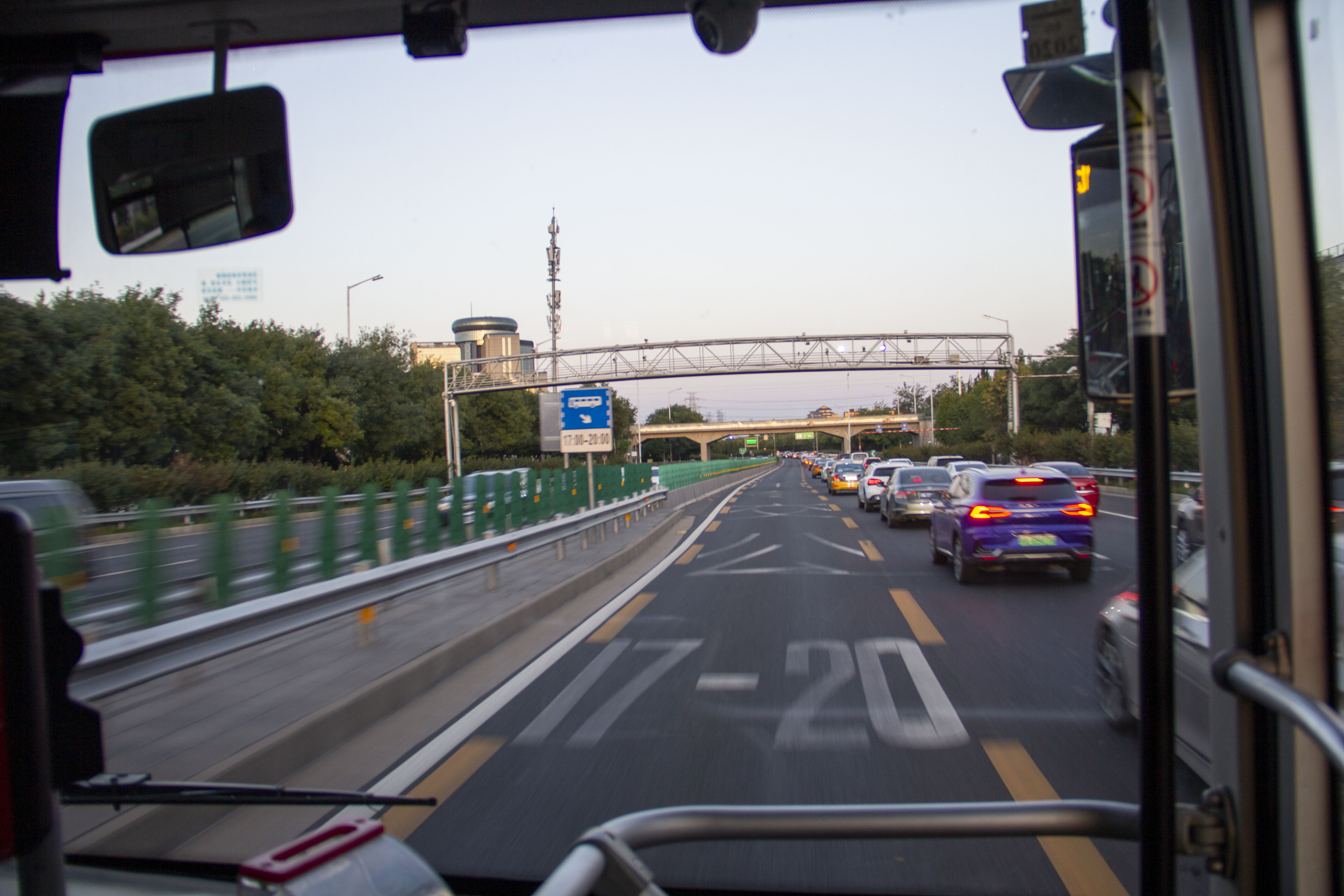
In Jingtong Expressway in Beijing

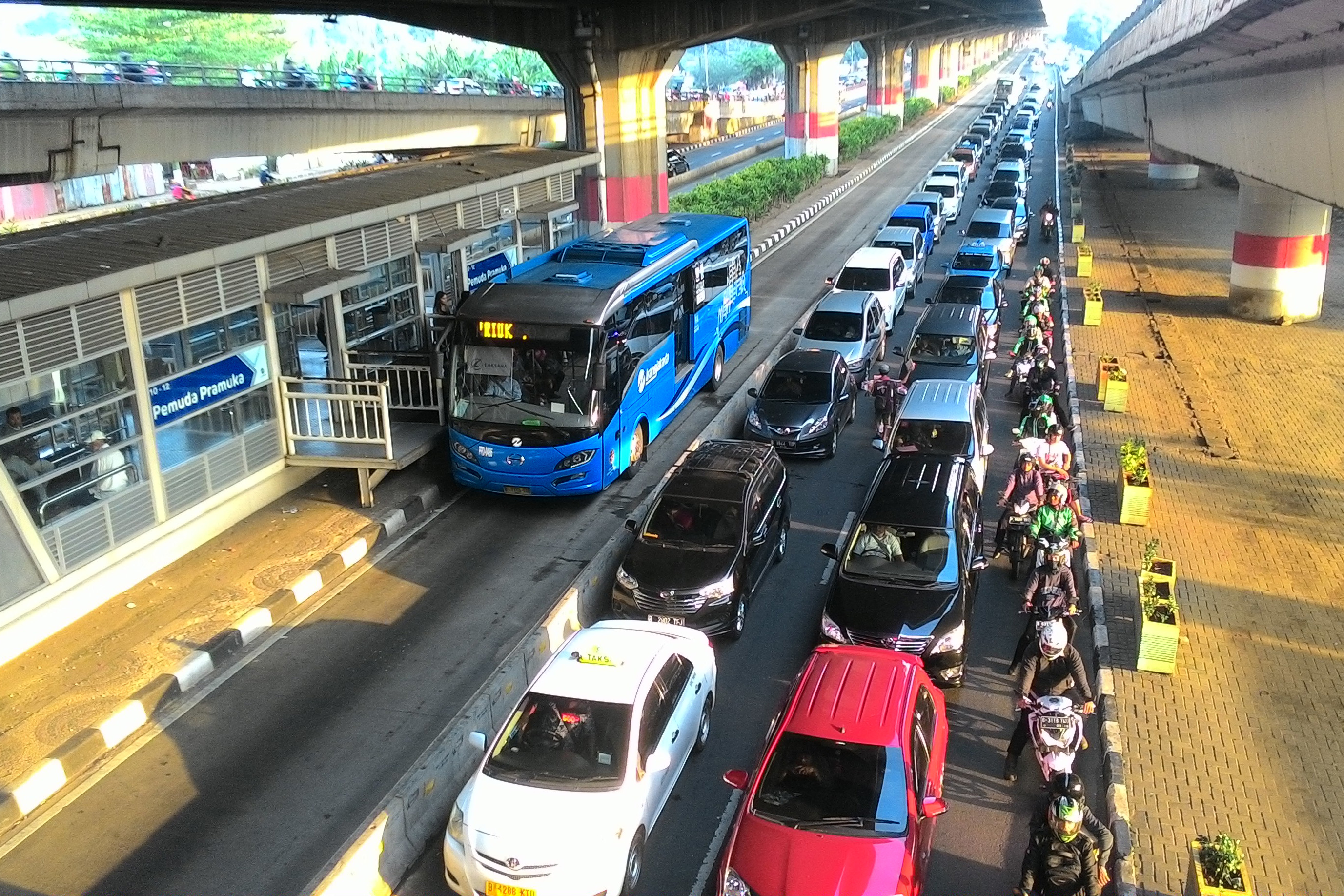
Rapid transit of Transjakarta in Jakarta, separated from heavy traffic

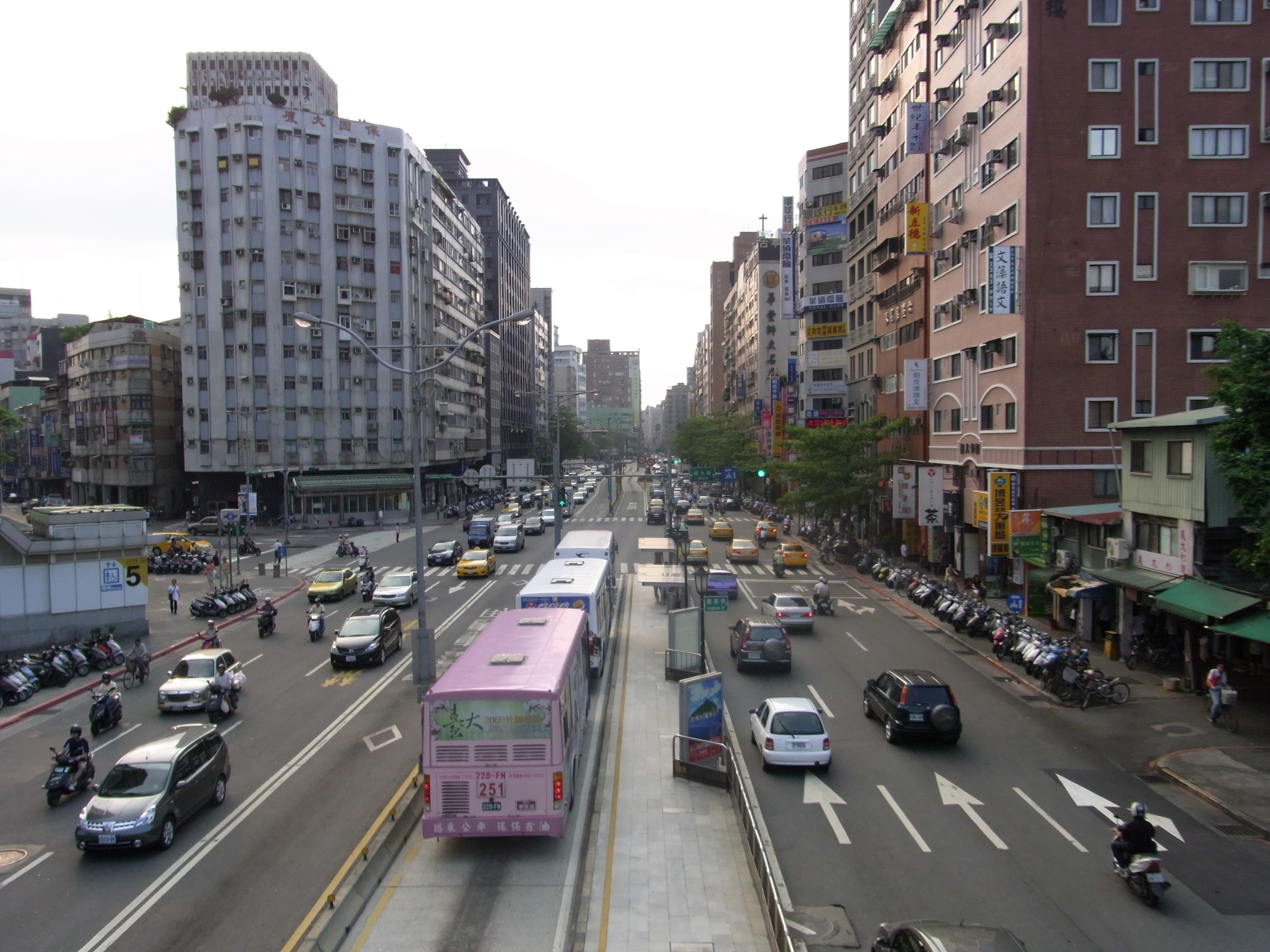
Bus lane in the middle of Roosevelt Road in Taipei, Taiwan

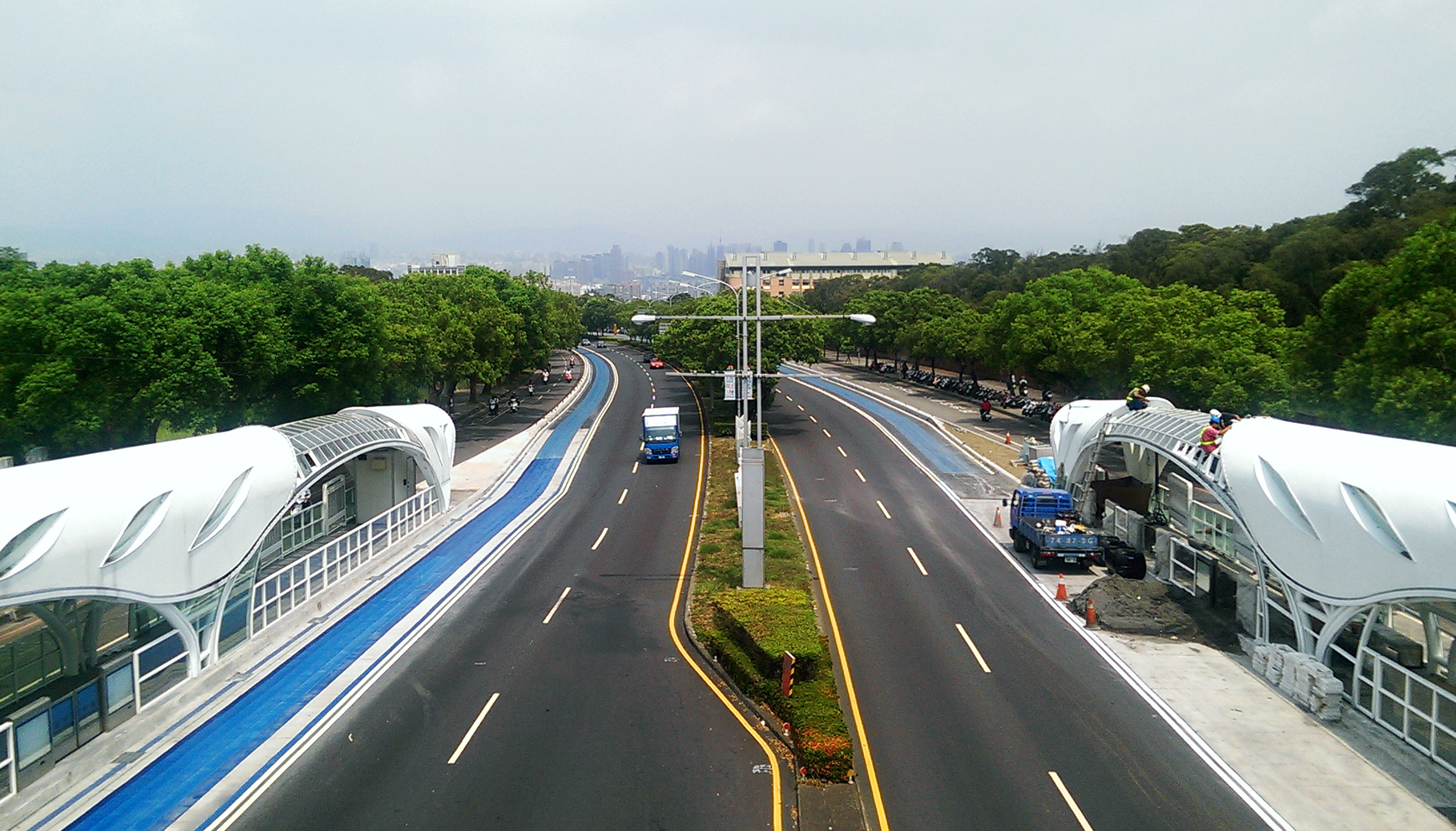
BRT lane laid on Taiwan Boulevard in Taichung, Taiwan

Bus and taxicab lane sign in Norway

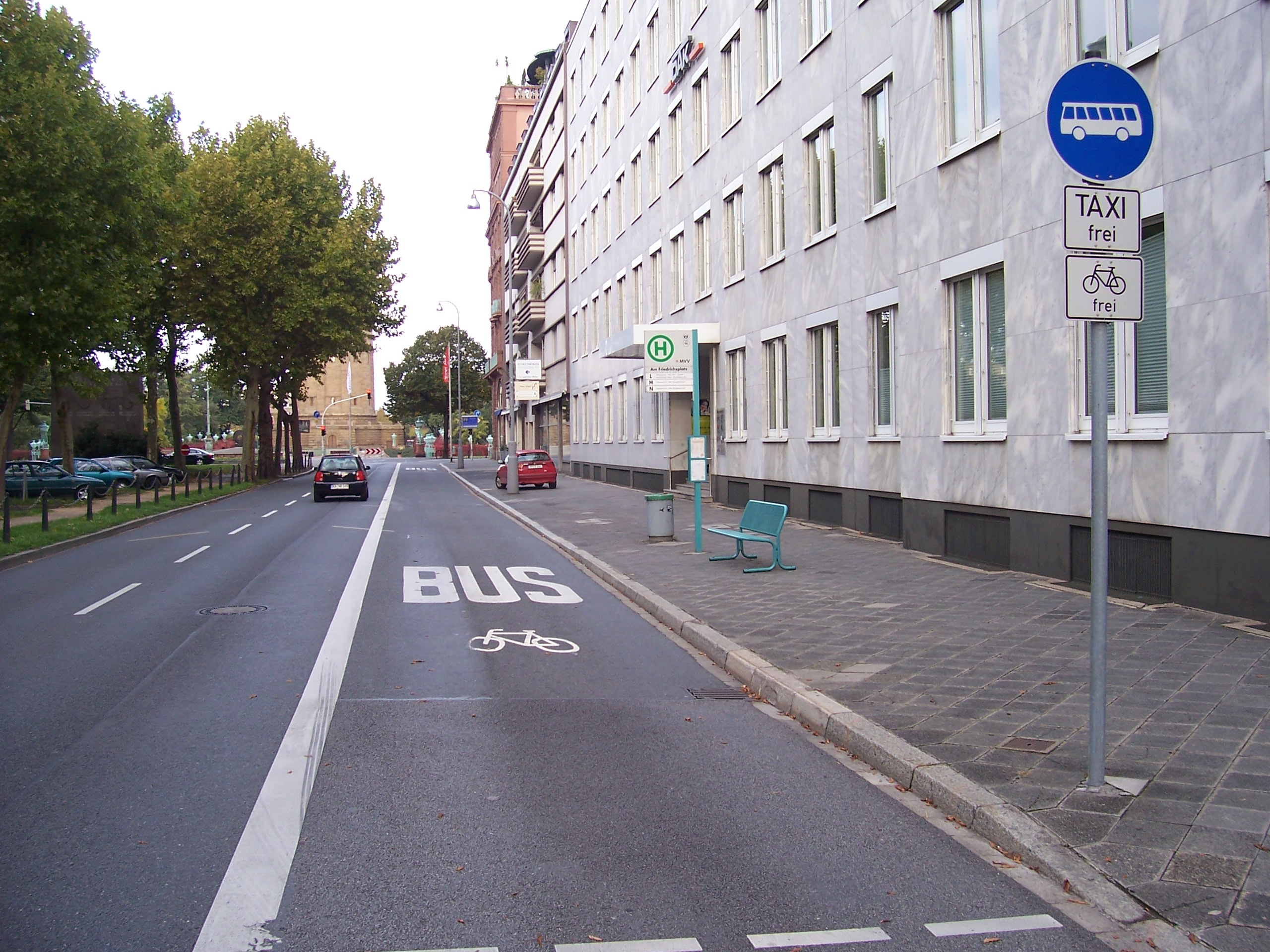
Bus lane in Mannheim, Germany

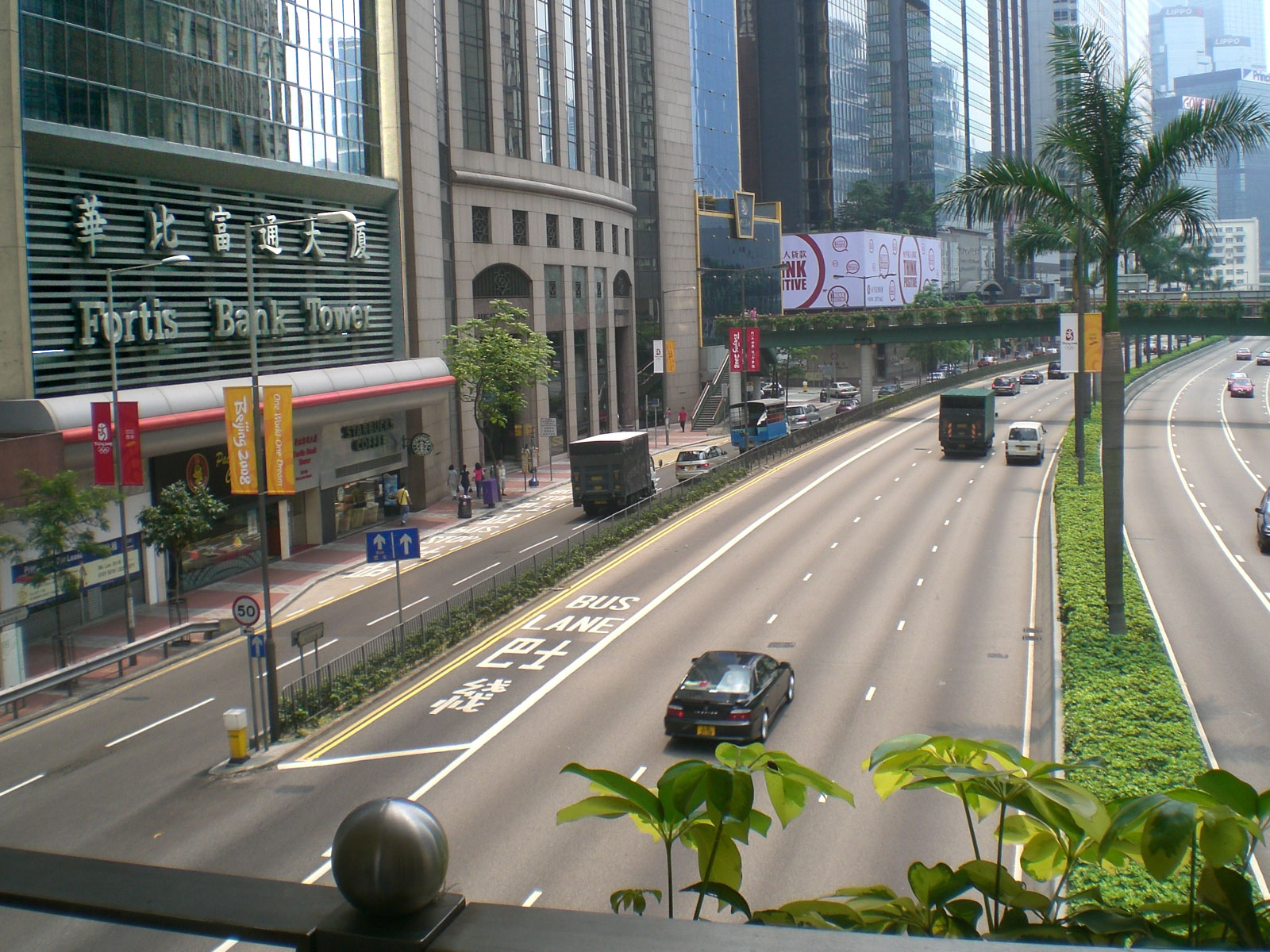
Bus lane on Gloucester Road in Hong Kong, with the words "bus lane" painted in English and "巴士綫" in Chinese

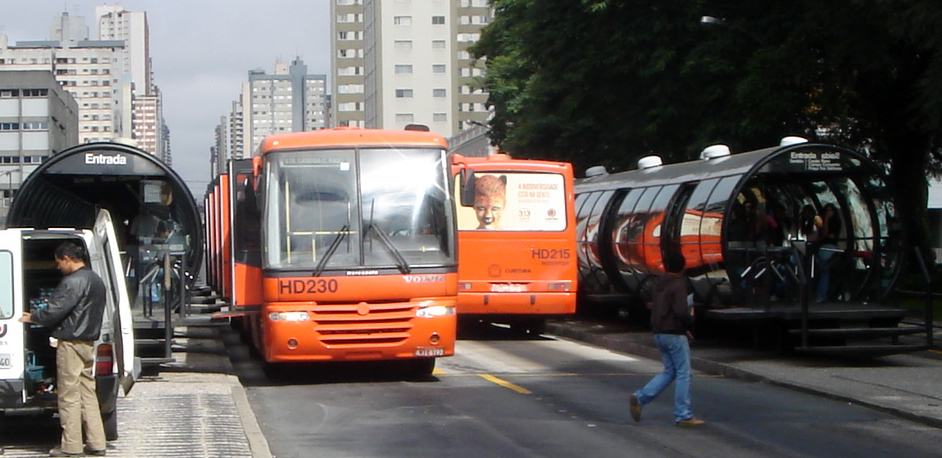
Bus lane of the pioneer Rede Integrada de Transporte in Curitiba, Brazil

== See also ==
- Bus rapid transit (BRT)
- Bus priority signal
- Guided bus
- High-occupancy vehicle lane (HOV lane)
- Public transport bus service
- Quality Bus Corridor
- Reversible lane
