= Bull Island (TV series) =

Irish television and radio satirical comedy show

- Genre: Comedy, satire
- Written by: Elva Crowley, Anne Geraghty, Catherine Maher, Pearse Lehane, Gary Flood, Michael Sheridan, Frank Twomey, Richard Carroll, Alan Shortt, Pakie O'Callaghan
- Directed by: John O'Keogh
- Starring: Alan Shortt; Michael Sheridan; Frank Twomey; Elva Crowley; Deirdre O'Kane; Pakie O'Callaghan; Gary Flood; Michelle Costello; Jenny Maher
- Country of origin: Ireland
- Original language: English

Production
- Producer: John Keogh
- Production locations: RTÉ Television Centre, Donnybrook, Dublin 4
- Camera setup: Multi-camera
- Running time: 30 minutes

Original release
- Network: RTÉ One
- Release: 4 November 1999 – 25 December 2001

Bull Island is an Irish television and radio satirical comedy show broadcast on RTÉ One and later on RTÉ Radio 1 from 1999 until 2001.

Featuring a cast of seven Irish comedians and impressionists, the show, which aired for half an hour weekly, satirised many aspects of Irish life.

Bull Island was created by RTÉ Producer/Director John Keogh who brought Michael Sheridan, Alan Shortt & Gary Flood together to devise & co-create the format.

Some of the notable women in power at the time, such as the then Cabinet Minister, Mary O'Rourke, and the Taoiseach Bertie Ahern's partner Celia Larkin were played by a man, and there were regular depictions of deception and skulduggery in the Dáil bar. The opposition were usually portrayed as bumbling incompetents.

Other sketches included a regular pastiche of Paddy O'Gorman and his shows which consist of interviewing people at random - Bull Island's Paddy O'Gormless would do similar, but with ever more inane interviews.

A favourite sketch, which became known as the show's signature, was an impersonation of a long-running ad for Irish discount electrical retailer PowerCity, where actors looking surprisingly like those in the adverts, wearing the same bright red jumpers, would wax enthusiastic about prices ending in 99 pence in "Bull Island City". This evolved into a stream of products costing "99.99.99" as the series progressed. As a result, PowerCity removed the pence from all their prices, and regularly charge round tens or hundreds for products instead of 99s.

Although the show was met with good reviews and ratings in its first season, the reception to later seasons was mixed and the show ended in 2001, shortly before the 2002 general election. The same team appeared providing a 30-minute radio version of the programme on RTÉ radio within weeks.

Some of the actors behind some impressions include:

- Alan Shortt - Bertie Ahern, Michael D. Higgins, Gerry Adams, Michael Noonan, Micheál Martin
- Frank Twomey - Mary O'Rourke, Celia Larkin, Willie O'Dea, David Trimble
- Michael Sheridan - Marian Finucane, Duncan Stewart, George Lee, Ruairi Quinn, Gerry Fleming, Gerry Daly, Ian Paisley, Jackie Healy-Rae, John de Chastelain, Christy Moore
- Pakie O'Callaghan - Charlie McCreevy, Desmond O'Malley, Eamon Dunphy, Charlie Bird, Brian Farrell
- Elva Crowley - Mary Harney, Power City Girl, Helen Dillon
- Michelle Costello - Mildred Fox, Miriam O'Callaghan
- Gary Flood - Paddy O'Gorman, Daniel O'Donnell, Dickie Rock

Bull Island was written by: Catherine Maher, Pearse Lehane, Richard Carroll, Elva Crowley, Anne Geraghty, Pakie O'Callaghan, Alan Shortt, Michael Sheridan & Gary Flood.

Produced by: John Keogh, Alan Robinson.

The series on RTE Player since Christmas 2021 to celebrate 60 Years Of Television.
