= Quality Bus Corridor =

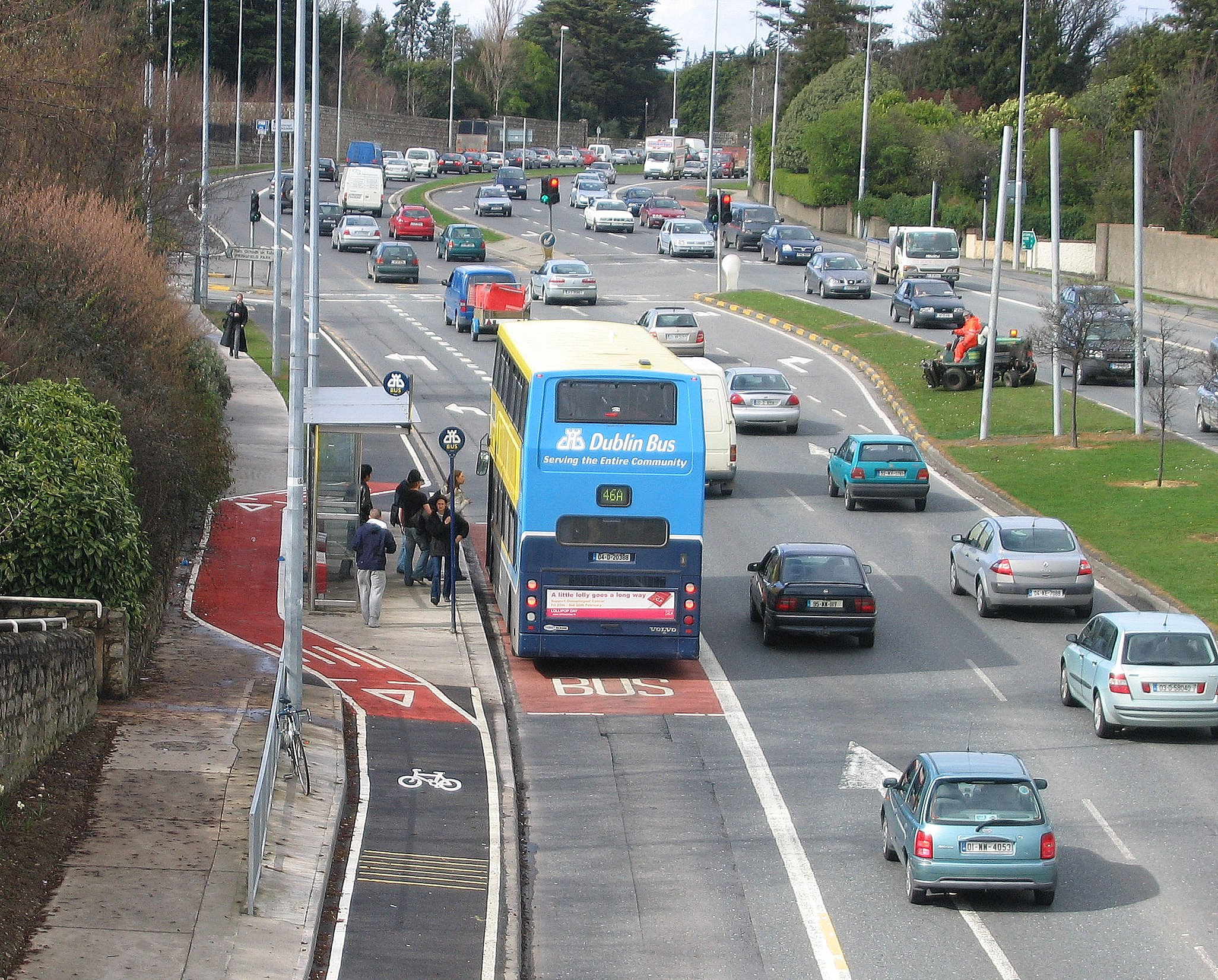
A bus operating the 46a on the N11 QBC at Foxrock

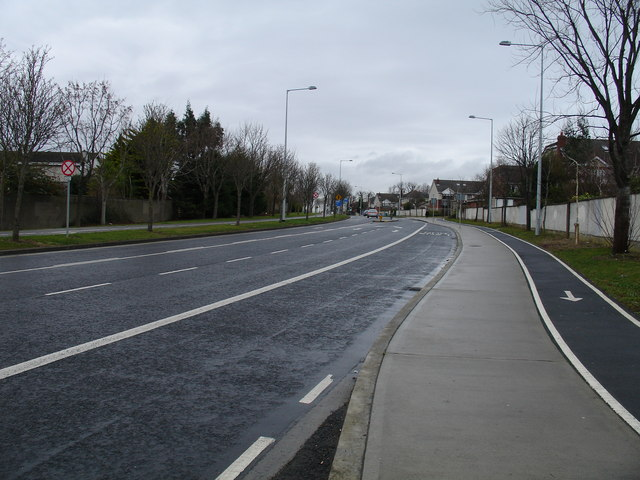
Quality Bus Corridor

Quality Bus Corridors (QBC, Irish: Mórlána Bus) are an initiative to give dedicated road space and traffic signal priority to buses in Dublin, Ireland in order to reduce journey times and improve service consistency. The aim of the initiative is to encourage people to change from cars to buses and thus reduce traffic congestion. The strategy requires co-ordination between the local authorities, who are responsible for the road changes required, and Dublin Bus who operate the vast majority of bus services. This co-ordination is managed by the National Transport Authority.

== History and development ==
The idea for the creation of QBCs first arose in 1993 when Dublin Bus launched its "CitySwift" service on route 39 to Clonsilla along the Navan Road. This became part of the eventual Blanchardstown QBC some years later.

Sixteen QBCs were subsequently opened in Dublin. A 2007 survey by the former Dublin Transportation Office found that bus average journey times in the morning peak were less than the corresponding car average journey times in twelve out of the sixteen QBCs monitored, with it being twice as fast in some cases.

The sixteen Quality Bus Corridors include:

- Ballymun QBC
- Blanchardstown QBC
- Bray QBC
- Clontarf QBC
- Crumlin Road QBC
- Finglas QBC
- Howth Road QBC
- Lucan QBC
- Malahide QBC
- North Clondalkin QBC
- Rathfarnham QBC
- Rock Road QBC
- South Clondalkin QBC
- Stillorgan QBC
- Swords QBC
- Tallaght QBC

== Effectiveness ==
According to the Dublin Transportation Office (now part of the National Transport Authority), the number of cars entering Dublin's inner city at the canal cordon points reduced by 10,708 (21.43%) from November 1997 to November 2009. Conversely the number of bus passengers entering the inner city increased by 15016 (49.17%) during the same period. However between 2003 and 2004 there was a reduction in bus passengers entering the inner city of 7.10%. In part this was attributed to the introduction of the Luas system, but an increase in car traffic of 5.74% was also noted.

The effectiveness of the QBCs are compromised at various pinch points along the routes. In particular, the routing of the majority of buses on the Lucan routes through Lucan and Chapelizod villages at peak mean that time savings may be lost on narrow congested streets filled with school traffic.

== Proposed changes ==
In November 2012, three QBCs (Swords, Blanchardstown and Tallaght) were designated for a potential upgrade to bus rapid transit status under the name "Swiftway". Public consultation on this matter was carried out during February and March 2014. However, this project didn't not progress past this stage. Instead of providing a bus rapid transit service on just 3 QBCs, it was decided that all 16 QBCs would be upgrades to CBCs or Core Bus Corridors and all 16 would be given bus priority for their entire length through bus lanes, bus gates and other priority measure.

On 29 May 2017, a new "BusConnects" plan was launched, with €1 billion proposed to be spent over a ten-year period. The project proposed the implementation of "next generation bus corridors" with "high quality cycling infrastructure", a redesign of the bus route network and a cashless ticketing system. According to a press release issued by the Department of Transport in March 2022, it was noted that, while a "final budget and delivery schedule for BusConnects Dublin" had not been established, the proposed budget was then projected to be €4 billion and work speculated to "be substantially complete by 2030".

== See also ==
- Bus lane
- Bus priority signal
- Bus rapid transit
- Guided bus
- Public transport
- Transit bus
