= DID Electrical =

Irish electrical and electronics retail chain

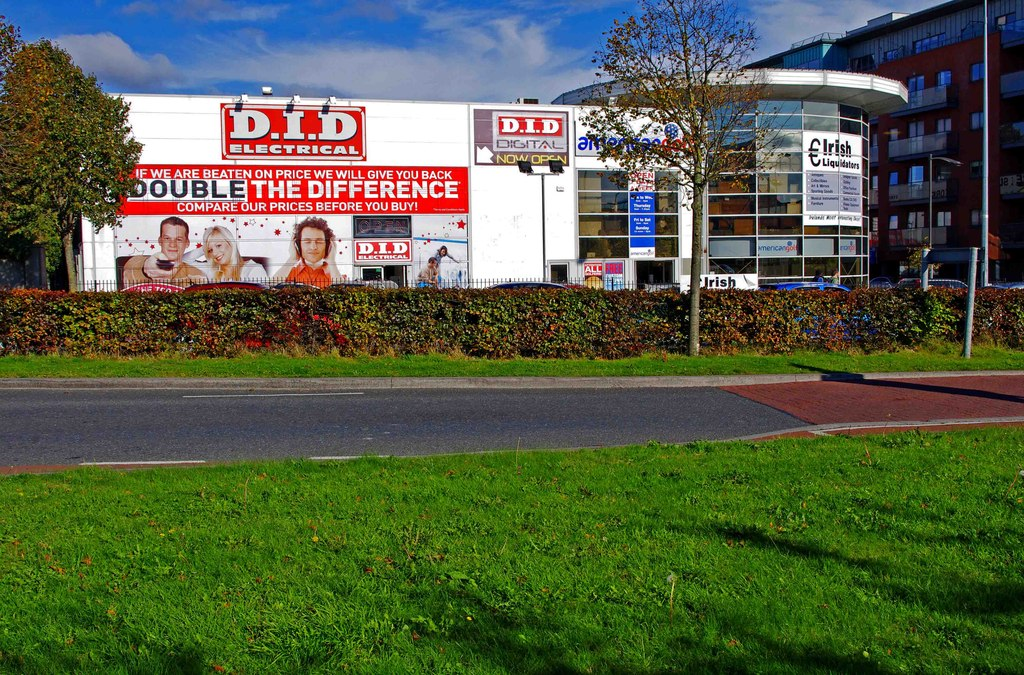
- DID Electrical shop in Tallaght, Dublin
- Industry: Retail
- Founded: 1968
- Headquarters: Dublin, Ireland
- Number of locations: 23
- Area served: Ireland
- Key people: Gerry Houlihan (founder)
- Products: White goods; Consumer electronics; Computers; Mobile phones
- Website: https://www.did.ie/

DID Electrical is an Irish chain of electrical and electronics shops. It has 23 outlets throughout Ireland, employing some 400 staff. It was founded in 1968, with a shop on Mountjoy Square, Dublin. Its main competitors are Irish chain PowerCity and UK chain Currys.

== History ==
The business was founded by Gerry Houlihan in 1968, with a basement shop on Mountjoy Square, Dublin. He called the shop Deliver, Install and Demonstrate (DID), in order to identify the service offered by the business and to assuage the concerns of potential customers of the late 1960s who may not have known how to use the items, given that many of them were buying electrical goods for the first time.

Houlihan and his wife, Carmel, ran the business from their Mountjoy Square shop, buying washing machines and freezers in bulk in order to significantly undercut the prices charged by their competitors.

The business was quickly successful, and less than two years after opening, Houlihan sold it for IR£60,000. He remained with the company as finance director. Some eighteen months later, the business was struggling, and Houlihan bought it back and returned it to profitability.

By 2006, DID Electrical had had 12 outlets, with eight in Dublin and one each in Drogheda, Kilkenny, Newbridge and Tullamore. By 2022, it had grown to a chain of 23 shops nationwide with some 400 staff.

In November 2023, it was announced that Select Tech Group had signed a deal to acquire all 23 outlets, with the DID Electrical brand to be retained. In December 2023, it was announced that the Competition and Consumer Protection Commission had approved the deal.
