= PowerCity =

Irish electrical and electronics retail chain

Power City

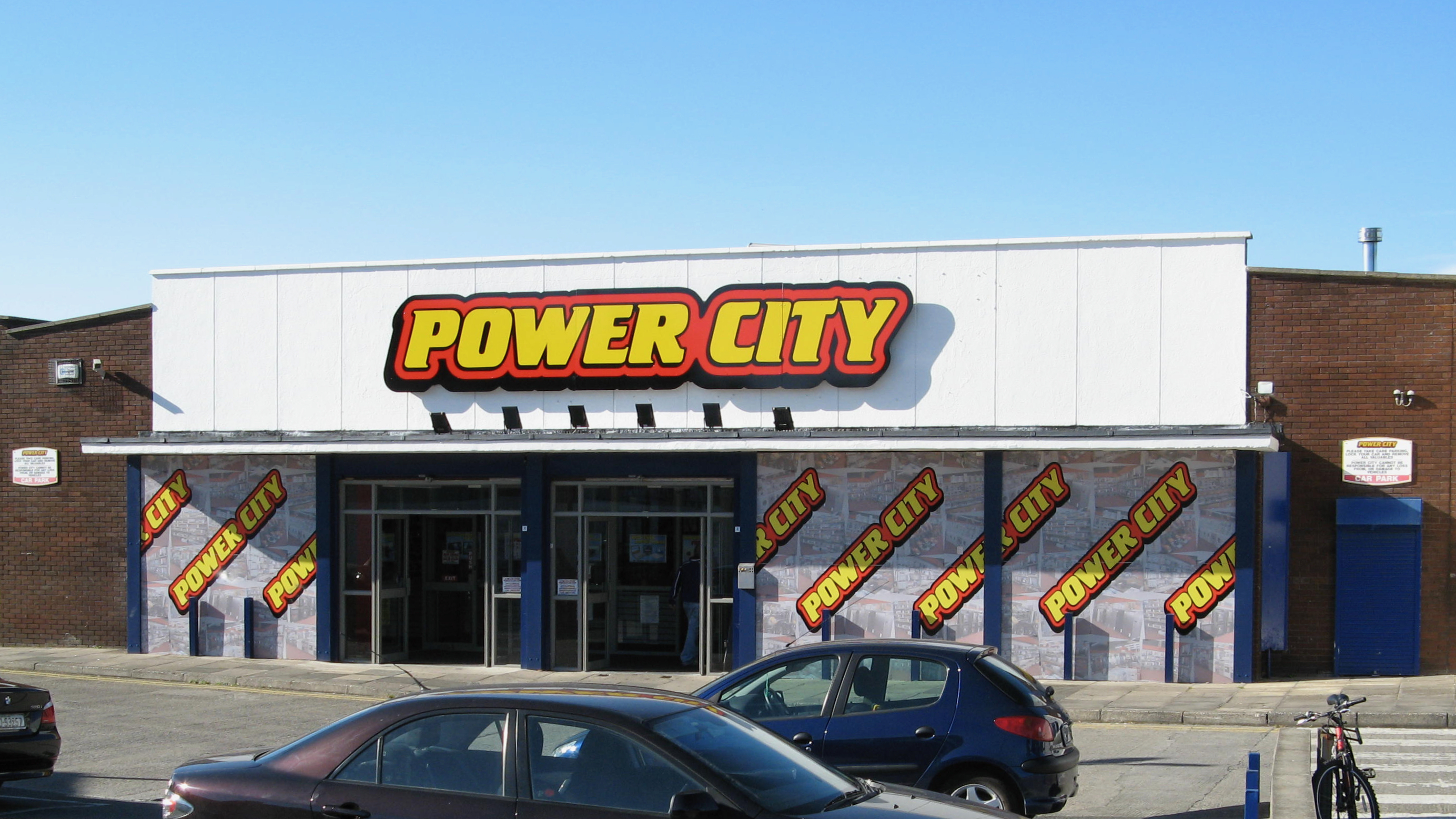
- Power City shop in Sallynoggin, Dublin
- Industry: Retail
- Headquarters: Bray, County Wicklow, Ireland,
- Number of locations: 11 shops
- Area served: Ireland
- Key people: Liam T McKenna, Dermot B McKenna and Sinéad McKenna (Directors)
- Products: Electrical goods
- Revenue: €100.24 million (2023)
- Owner: McKenna family (100%)
- Number of employees: 240
- Website: https://www.powercity.ie/

Power City is an Irish electrical retailer of consumer and electronic goods owned by the Bray-based McKenna family, with branches in Blanchardstown, Coolock, Tallaght, Finglas, Fonthill, Sallynoggin, Drogheda, Bray, Naas, Carrickmines and in the Airside Retail Park, Swords. A former branch was located in the Airways Industrial Estate, Santry Its main competitors are Irish chain DID Electrical and UK chain Currys.

According to the Irish Times Top 1000 Companies, in 2017 the company made a profit of €5.3 million on a turnover of €85.4 million with a staff of 250 compared to €8.4 million profit on a turnover of €87 million in 2003 with a staff of 180. The company was rated 63 in the 2020 CXi report of the Ireland Customer Experience Report.

The chain formerly had a range of badge-engineered home entertainment products under the brand "ZX", including video cassette recorders, televisions and satellite dishes.

Their advertising was heavily satirised on Bull Island for many reasons, including then staff uniform of red and white striped shirts and red v-neck jumpers, hyperbolic phrasing and use of psychological pricing - with products in the satire ads frequently costing €9,999.99 or a similar figure.
