= Brain Drain =

Brain Drain may refer to:

- Human capital flight, also known as "brain drain"

== Film ==
- Brain Drain (film), 2009 Spanish comedy film directed by Fernando González Molina

== Literature ==
- Brain Drain, a 1976 novel by Warren Murphy and Richard Sapir, the 22nd installment in The Destroyer series
- Brain Drain (character), a Marvel Comics character created by Roy Thomas and Frank Robbins
- Brain Drain!, a 2006 Marvel Comics publication featuring Spider-Man and the Fantastic Four written by Tom DeFalco published as a giveaway promo for OfficeMax and TeachersCount

== Music ==
- Brain Drain (album), a 1989 Ramones album
- Brain Drain, a previously unreleased song by British rock band The Lightning Seeds on 1997 compilation album Like You Do... Best of The Lightning Seeds

== Television ==
=== Episodes ===
- "Brain Drain", Animalia season 1, episode 14 (2008)
- "Brain Drain", A.T.O.M. season 2, episode 6 (2006)
- "Brain Drain", Charmed season 4, episode 7 (2001)
- "Brain Drain", Clarissa Explains It All season 1, episode 9 (1991)
- "Brain Drain", Cleopatra 2525 season 2, episode 3 (2000)
- "Brain Drain", Dragnet (1989) season 2, episode 8 (1990)
- "Brain Drain", Fanboy & Chum Chum season 1, episode 37 (2010)
- "Brain Drain", Friday the 13th: The Series season 1, episode 18 (1988)
- "Brain Drain", Hotel Transylvania: The Series season 1 episode 16a (2017)
- "Brain Drain", Inspector Gadget (2015) season 2 episode 7b (2015)
- "Brain Drain", Intergalactic Kitchen episode 2 (2004)
- "Brain Drain", Legion of Super Heroes season 1, episode 7 (2007)
- "Brain Drain", My Hero (British) series 5, episode 6 (2005)
- "Brain Drain", Phineas and Ferb season 2, episode 62 (2010)
- "Brain Drain", Russian Doll season 2, episode 3 (2022)
- "Brain Drain", Silversun season 2, episode 4 (2004)
- "Brain Drain", Spider-Man (2017) season 2, episode 12 (2018)
- "Brain Drain", The Book of Pooh season 1, episode 21 (2001)
- "Brain Drain", The New Adventures of He-Man episode 44 (1990)
- "Brain Drain", The Penguins of Madagascar season 2, episode 36 (2011)
- "Brain Drain", The Powers of Matthew Star episode 18 (1983)
- "Brain Drain", The Twisted Whiskers Show episode 35 (2010)
- "Brain Drain", Totally Spies! season 2, episode 23 (2003)
- "Brain Drain", Yin Yang Yo! season 2, episode 4a (2008)
- "Doug's Brain Drain", Doug season 5, episode 12 (1996)
- "The Brain Drain", Los Luchadores episode 9 (2001)
- "The Brain Drain", Pardon the Expression series 1, episode 12 (1965)
- "The Brain Drain", Tattooed Teenage Alien Fighters from Beverly Hills episode 11 (1994)

=== Series ===
- The Brain Drain, a BBC comedy panel show

== Other uses ==
- "Brain Drain", a fictional devolution medicine pill invented by Professor Screweyes as the polar opposite of "Brain Grain", a fictional neuroenhancement breakfast cereal, featured in the 1993 film We're Back! A Dinosaur's Story
- Brain Drain, the slide filled with soap in Nickelodeon's game show, BrainSurge

== See also ==
- Brain Dead
