= Allen Kay =

American advertising executive (1945–2022)

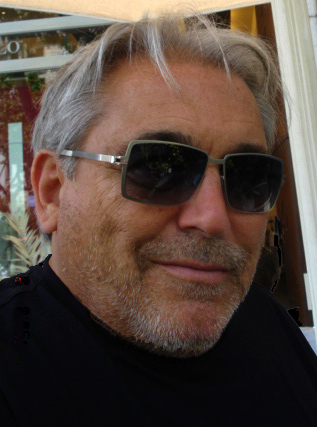
- Past Chairman and CEO at Korey Kay & Partners Advertising
- Born: November 25, 1945; New York City, U.S.
- Died: November 27, 2022 (aged 77)
- Education: Art Center College of Design
- Occupation: Advertising businessman

Allen Steven Kay (November 25, 1945 – November 27, 2022) was an American advertising executive and businessman. He created a television advertisement for Xerox that aired during the 1976 Super Bowl, featuring a monk called Dominic. Kay is also known for his "If You See Something, Say Something" advertising campaign for the New York Metropolitan Transportation Authority. Kay co-founded Korey Kay & Partners advertising in 1982 and served as its Chairman and CEO for 32 years. Kay was active in several advertising industry associations.

== Early years ==
Allen Kay was born in New York City, to Estelle and Samuel Kay. His mother was a finance professional and his father was the comptroller at Grey Advertising in New York. Kay began studying art at the age of six at the Museum of Modern Art in New York and continued his fine arts education at The Art Students League of New York. Before starting high school, he moved from Washington Heights, Manhattan, to Fair Lawn, New Jersey. There he attended Fair Lawn High School, graduating in 1963.

Kay attended the Art Center College of Design in Los Angeles. During the summers, he worked at Grey Advertising, sold encyclopedias, and freelanced for his instructors at The Art Center College of Design. He earned a BA, with honors, and graduated in 1967. Two days after graduation, Kay joined the McCann Erickson advertising agency in New York.

== Advertising career ==
At McCann Erickson, Kay worked as an art director, writer and producer. His work included ad campaigns for Coca-Cola, Exxon, and Nabisco. In 1970, Kay left McCann Erickson to join Jack Tinker's Interpublic agency. There he won a Clio Award, in 1971, as the Art Director and Producer of advertisements for Nelson Rockefeller's last gubernatorial campaign. Kay joined Needham, Harper & Steers in 1971 and created ads for Amtrak, Frigidaire, Xerox and AIG. While at Needham, Kay attended a six-week advanced management program at Harvard University, earning an AAF diploma in Professional Studies in 1978. During this same time Needham, Harper & Steers became Needham Worldwide.

Kay, along with Lois Korey, left Needham Worldwide to start their own firm, Korey Kay & Partners in 1982. Kay has said in interviews that big agencies tend to water down ideas and tie up talent; in a 1993 interview with Leaders magazine, Kay told reporters that "a large staff is important if you’re moving furniture, but a smart and prolific staff is what does it. So it's more important to have smart people who understand clients than to have the largest creative department in New York." In its first year Korey Kay signed six clients with a combined ad budget of $10 million and generated revenue of $800,000. Early clients were The Republican National Committee and the campaign for Ronald Reagan's re-election. Some of Korey Kay's clients included Virgin Atlantic, Comedy Central, Honda, Wynn Resorts and the Metropolitan Transportation Authority of New York.

In 2016 Kay founded The Advertising Company, Inc., which replaced Korey Kay & Partners, his previous ad agency.

== Advertisements ==
While at Needham Worldwide he created the Brother Dominic campaign for Xerox which premiered during the 1976 Super Bowl. In developing the Xerox campaigns Kay worked with the computer scientist, Alan Kay (no relation), who led the development team at Xerox PARC (now PARC). Advertising Age named Brother Dominic one of the top 50 campaigns of the 20th century and ESPN called the spot the prelude to every boundary-pushing ad that followed. The New York Times called it one of the top 25 ads of the 20th century. The Brother Dominic campaign was inducted into the Clio Hall of Fame. In all, there were six Brother Dominic spots that aired on television between 1976 and 1982.

Since 1992, Kay's agency has been responsible for the New York Metropolitan Transportation Authority's advertising. To give the MTA a human voice, Kay and his team created the "SubTalk" brand by which MTA posts messages to riders in stations and on subway trains. He coined the phrase, "If You See Something, Say Something" for MTA's campaign to encourage riders to be part of MTA's security efforts. Since 2002 the campaign has evolved from simple print ads to television spots, increasing the reporting of suspicious packages from 814 in 2002 to over 37,000 in 2003. Today, more than 30 transit systems use a version of Kay's "See Something, Say Something" campaign.

In the genre of personality-driven advertisements, Kay conceived the campaign for the Steve Wynn hotel and casino, Wynn Las Vegas which featured Steve Wynn standing on top of his Las Vegas hotel.

== Personal life and death ==
Kay was married and had two daughters. He died on November 27, 2022, at the age of 77.

== Awards ==
Kay holds 22 Clio awards. Advertising Age named him one of 11 influential high-tech marketing professionals of the 20th century. Kay is featured in chapter four of Guy Kawasaki's Business Week best seller, How To Drive Your Competition Crazy.

== Industry and charitable affiliations ==
Kay was a charter member of the Value of Advertising Committee of the American Association of Advertising Agencies (AAAA), holding that post from 1998 till 2001. From 1999 to 2001 he was the Co-Chair of the AAAA's Creative Committee. He chaired the AAAA New York Board of Governors from 1999 to 2008, creating their annual "Unthinkable Ideas" new media conference, co-sponsored by Advertising Age.

Kay was a member of the Directors Guild of America from 1984. From 2000 to 2003, Kay was a voting board member of the Ad Council; from 2003 through 2007 he was a graduate member and served on their campaigns review committee. Kay was a founding member of Colin Powell's America's Promise, designing its logo and website icon, and served on its Advisory Board through 2001.

Kay appeared on network television and lectured before industry and professional groups. Kay's community service included ten years on the steering committee of the Association for a Better New York. He served on the Advisory Boards of TeachersCount until 2001 where he came up with the campaign slogan "Behind every famous person is a fabulous teacher", and designed the website. From 1996 Kay served on the board of PENCIL, creating an ad every year that was featured in The New York Times. Kay was a life member of The Art Students League of New York, and served for eight years as a consultant to the New York Philharmonic's marketing board.
