= Metropolitan Transportation Authority =

Public transportation organization in New York

- Logo used since 1994

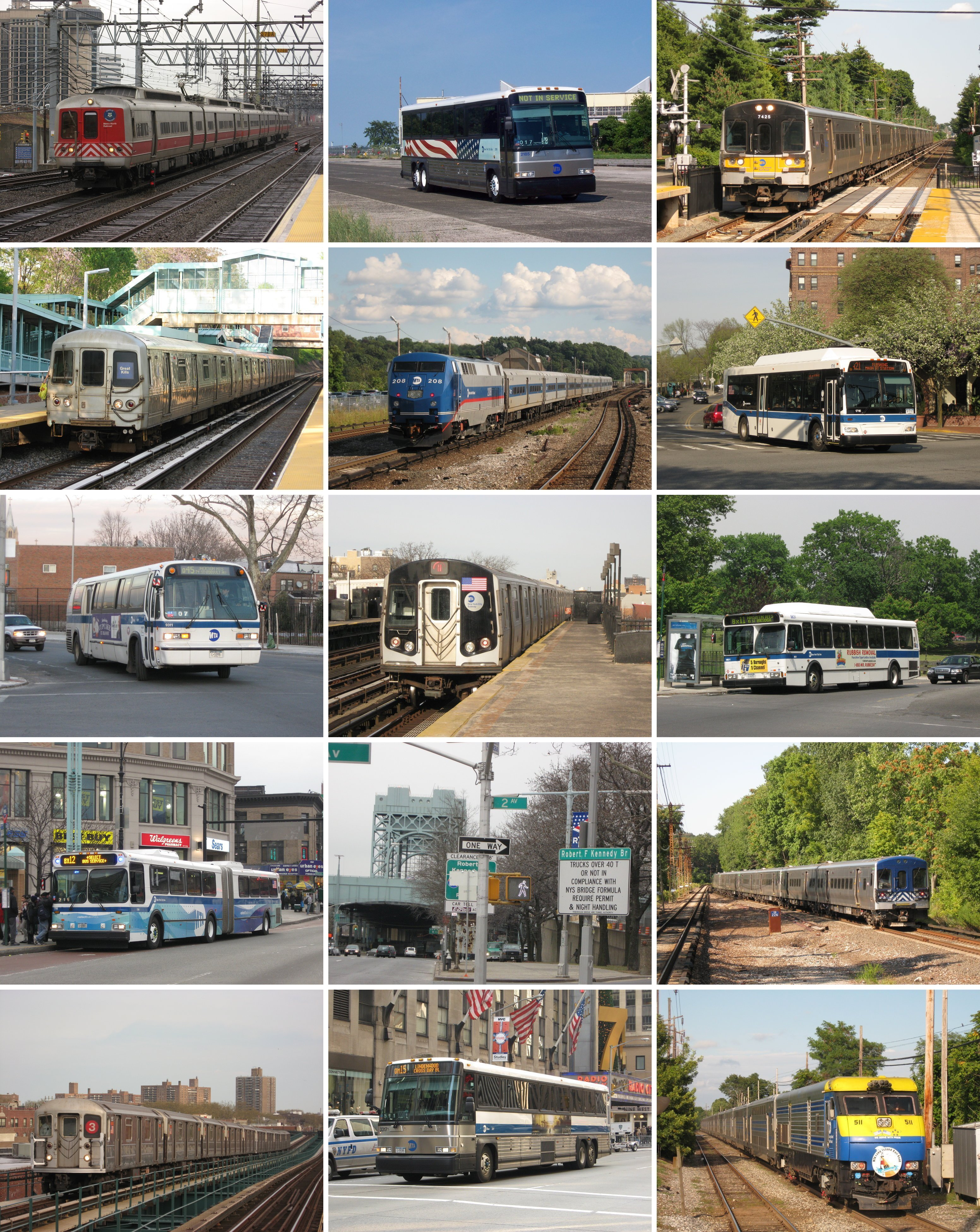
- The Metropolitan Transportation Authority (MTA) provides local and express bus, subway, and commuter rail service in Greater New York, and operates multiple toll bridges and tunnels in New York City.

Overview
- Owner: State of New York
- Locale: New York City; Long Island; Lower Hudson Valley; Coastal Connecticut; Lower Housatonic Valley; Lower Naugatuck River Valley
- Transit type: Commuter rail, local and express bus, subway, bus rapid transit
- Number of lines: 19 commuter rail routes; 8 Metro-North routes; 11 LIRR routes; 26 rapid transit routes; 25 subway routes; 1 Staten Island Railway route; 345 bus routes; 248 local routes; 77 express routes; 20 Select Bus Service routes
- Daily ridership: 3.6 million (2023 weekday average)
- Annual ridership: 1.15 billion (2023)
- Key people: Janno Lieber, Chairman & CEO
- Headquarters: 2 Broadway, Manhattan, New York City
- Website: mta.info

Operation
- Began operation: June 1, 1965
- Operators: MTA Long Island Rail Road; MTA Metro-North Railroad; MTA New York City Subway; MTA Regional Bus Operations; MTA Staten Island Railway
- Number of vehicles: 2,429 commuter rail cars 6,787 subway cars 61 SIR cars 5,840 buses

The Metropolitan Transportation Authority (MTA) is a public benefit corporation in New York State responsible for public transportation in the New York City metropolitan area. The MTA is the largest public transit authority in North America, serving 12 counties in Downstate New York, along with two counties in southwestern Connecticut under contract with the Connecticut Department of Transportation (CTDOT), carrying over 11 million passengers on an average weekday systemwide, and over 850,000 vehicles on its seven toll bridges and two tunnels per weekday.

The MTA maintains two law enforcement agencies, the MTA Police Department and the Triborough Bridge and Tunnel Authority Law Enforcement Division (under the Triborough Bridge and Tunnel Authority, a child agency of the MTA).

== History ==
=== Founding ===
In February 1965, New York governor Nelson Rockefeller suggested that the New York State Legislature create an authority to purchase, operate, and modernize the Long Island Rail Road (LIRR). The LIRR, then a subsidiary of the Pennsylvania Railroad (PRR), had been operating under bankruptcy protection since 1949. The proposed authority would also have the power to make contracts or arrangements with other commuter rail operators in the New York City area. On June 1, 1965, the legislature chartered the Metropolitan Commuter Transportation Authority (MCTA) to take over the operations of the LIRR. Governor Rockefeller appointed his top aide, William J. Ronan, as chairman and chief executive officer of the MCTA. In June 1965, the state finalized an agreement to buy the LIRR from the PRR for $65 million. The MCTA made a down payment of $10 million for the LIRR in December 1965, and it completed the rest of the payment the next month.

In February 1965, Rockefeller and Connecticut governor John N. Dempsey jointly suggested that operations of the New Haven Line, the New Haven Railroad's struggling commuter rail operation, be transferred to the New York Central Railroad as part of a plan to prevent the New Haven Railroad from going bankrupt. If the operational merger occurred, the proposed MCTA and the existing Connecticut Transportation Authority would contract with New York Central to operate the New Haven Line to Grand Central Terminal. A September 1965 joint report from both agencies, recommended that the line be leased to New York Central for 99 years, with the MCTA and CTA acting as agents for both states.

In October 1965, the MCTA found that the condition of the New Haven Line's stations and infrastructure were even more decrepit than those of the LIRR. The New Haven Railroad's trustees initially opposed New York Central's takeover of the New Haven Line, as they felt that the $140 million offer for the New Haven Line was too low. After some discussion, the trustees decided to continue operating the New Haven Line until June 1967.

In January 1966, New York City Mayor John Lindsay proposed merging the New York City Transit Authority (NYCTA), which operated buses and subways in New York City, and the Triborough Bridge and Tunnel Authority (TBTA), which operated toll bridges and tunnels within the city. Rockefeller offered his "complete support" for Lindsay's proposed unified transit agency, while longtime city planner and TBTA chair Robert Moses called the proposed merger "absurd" and "grotesque" for its unwieldiness. In June 1966, Rockefeller announced his plans to expand the MCTA's scope to create a new regional transit authority. The new authority would encompass the existing MCTA, as well as the NYCTA and TBTA. Lindsay disagreed, saying that the state and city should have operationally separate transit authorities that worked in tandem.

In May 1967, Rockefeller signed a bill that allowed the MCTA to oversee the mass transit policies of New York City-area transit systems. The unification agreement took place the following March, with the MCTA taking over the operations of the LIRR, NYCTA, TBTA, New Haven commuter services, New York Central commuter services, and the Staten Island Rapid Transit Railway. Initially, the TBTA was resistant to the MCTA's efforts to acquire it. Moses was afraid that the enlarged MCTA would "undermine, destroy or tarnish" the integrity of the TBTA, One source of contention was Rockefeller's proposal to use TBTA tolls in order to subsidize the cheap fares of the NYCTA, since Moses strongly opposed any use of TBTA tolls by outside agencies. In February 1968, Moses acquiesced to the MCTA's merger proposal. New York Central and the PRR merged in February 1968, forming the Penn Central Transportation Company.

In February 1968, the MCTA published a 56-page report for Governor Rockefeller, proposing several subway and railroad improvements under the name "Metropolitan Transportation, a Program for Action" alternatively called the "Grand Design". The city had already intended to build subway extensions in all four boroughs, so that most riders would need at most one transfer to get to their destination. The Program for Action also called for upgrades to the Penn Central railroads and area airports. The Program for Action was put forward simultaneously with other development and transportation plans under the administration of Mayor Lindsay. This included Lindsay's Linear City plan for housing and educational facilities, and the projected construction of several Interstate Highways, many of which had originally been proposed by Robert Moses.

=== Expanded purview ===
On March 1, 1968, the day after the release of the Program for Action, the MCTA dropped the word "Commuter" from its name and became the Metropolitan Transportation Authority (MTA). The MTA took over the operations of the other New York City-area transit systems. Moses was let go from his job as chairman of the TBTA, although he was retained as a consultant. The construction of two proposed bridges over the Long Island Sound was put under the jurisdiction of the MTA. Moses stated that TBTA construction projects would reduce the MTA's budget surplus through to 1970. Chairman Ronan pushed for the MTA to pursue the Program for Action, saying, "We're making up for 30 years of do-nothingism".

Ronan proposed that the MTA take over the Staten Island Rapid Transit Railway Company from the Baltimore and Ohio Railroad and start a $25 million modernization project on the railway. The city's Board of Estimate approved this purchase in December 1969. The MTA took ownership of the Staten Island Rapid Transit in January 1971.

The agency entered into a long-term lease of Penn Central's Hudson, Harlem, and New Haven Lines. Before 1968, the Hudson and Harlem Lines had been operated by the New York Central Railroad, while the New Haven Line had been part of the New York, New Haven and Hartford Railroad. Penn Central continued to operate the lines under contract to the MTA. In April 1970, Rockefeller proposed that the state take over the Hudson and Harlem Lines. The next month, he signed a bond issue that provided $44.4 million in funding to these lines. Penn Central's operations were folded into Conrail in 1976. The MTA took over full operations in 1983, and merged the lines into the Metro-North Commuter Railroad. In 1994, the MTA rebranded its five subsidiaries with simpler names to convey that the different agencies were part of one agency.

== Responsibilities and service area ==
Map of the 12 counties that comprise the Metropolitan Commuter Transportation District

The MTA has the responsibility for developing and implementing a unified mass transportation policy for the New York metropolitan area, including all five boroughs of New York City and the suburban counties of Dutchess, Nassau, Orange, Putnam, Rockland, Suffolk and Westchester. This twelve-county area make up the "Metropolitan Commuter Transportation District" (MCTD), within which the New York State Department of Taxation and Finance levies a "metropolitan commuter transportation mobility tax". In January 2022, Janno Lieber was appointed chair and CEO.

The MTA's immediate past chairpersons were William J. Ronan (1965–1974), David Yunich (1974–1975), Harold L. Fisher (1975–1979), Richard Ravitch (1979–1983), Robert Kiley (1983–1991), Peter Stangl (1991–1995), Virgil Conway (1995–2001), Peter S. Kalikow (2001–2007), H. Dale Hemmerdinger (2007–2009), Jay Walder (2009–2011), Joseph Lhota (2012), Thomas F. Prendergast (2013–2017), Joseph Lhota (2017–2018) and Patrick J. Foye (2019–2021).

The MTA considers itself to be the largest regional public transportation provider in the Western Hemisphere. As of 2018, its agencies serve a region of approximately 15.3 million people spread over 5,000 square miles (13,000 km^{2}) in 12 counties in New York and two in Connecticut. MTA agencies now move about 8.6 million customers per day (translating to 2.65 billion rail and bus customers a year) and employ about 74,000 people. The MTA's systems carry over 11 million passengers on an average weekday systemwide, and over 850,000 vehicles on its seven toll bridges and two tunnels per weekday.

== Subsidiaries and affiliates ==
MTA carries out these planning and other responsibilities both directly and through its subsidiaries and affiliates, and provides oversight to these subordinate agencies, known collectively as "The Related Entities". The Related Entities represent a number of previously existing agencies which have come under the MTA umbrella. These previously existing agencies were, with the exception of MTA Bridges and Tunnels, MTA Construction and Development, and MTA Grand Central Madison Concourse, successors to the property of private companies that provided substantially the same services.

In 1994, the MTA spent $3 million rebranding its five subsidiaries with simpler names to convey that the different agencies were part of one agency. Surveys found that a majority of riders did not know that the MTA owned the Long Island Rail Road or the Metro-North Railroad. As part of the changes, the Triborough Bridge and Tunnel Authority was renamed MTA Bridges and Tunnels; Staten Island Rapid Transit was renamed MTA Staten Island Railway; Metropolitan Suburban Bus Authority was renamed MTA Long Island Bus. The New York City Transit Authority was renamed MTA New York City Transit to seem less authoritarian, Metro–North Commuter Railroad was renamed MTA Metro-North Railroad to recognize the increase in non-commuter ridership.

The MTA logo was changed from a two-toned "M" logo, to a blue circle with the MTA initials written in perspective, as if they were rushing by like a train. The large "M" logos on trains and buses were replaced with decals that state MTA New York City Bus, MTA New York City Subway or MTA Staten Island Railway, eliminating inconsistencies in signage. Today, the older "M" logos survive on existing cube-shaped lamps on station lampposts dating to the 1980s, though such lamps have been updated with more modern spherical lamps over time.

Today, each of these Related Entities has a popular name and in some cases, a former legal name. Since 1994, the legal name has only been used for legal documents, such as contracts, and have not been used publicly. Since the mid-2000s, the popular name has also been used for legal documents related to contract procurements where the legal name was used heretofore. Both are listed below.

=== Subsidiary agencies ===
- MTA Long Island Rail Road (LIRR)
  (legal name, no longer used publicly: The Long Island Rail Road Company)
- MTA Metro-North Railroad (MNR)
  (legal name, no longer used publicly: Metro-North Commuter Railroad Company)
- MTA Grand Central Madison Concourse (GCMC)
  (legal name, not used publicly: MTA Grand Central Madison Concourse Operating Company)
- MTA Staten Island Railway (SIR)
  (legal name, no longer used publicly: Staten Island Rapid Transit Operating Authority)
- MTA Construction and Development (MTAC&D)
  (legal name, not used publicly: MTA Construction and Development Company)
- MTA Regional Bus Operations, consisting of:
  - MTA Bus
    (legal name, sometimes used publicly: MTA Bus Company)
  - MTA New York City Bus
- First Mutual Transportation Assurance Company (legal name, not used publicly; no public name)

=== Affiliate agencies ===
- MTA Bridges and Tunnels (MTA B&T)
  (legal name, no longer used publicly: Triborough Bridge and Tunnel Authority, or TBTA)
- MTA New York City Transit (NYCT)
  (legal name, no longer used publicly: New York City Transit Authority and its subsidiary, the Manhattan and Bronx Surface Transit Operating Authority, or MaBSTOA)
  The Bus division is now managed under Regional Bus.

=== Former subsidiaries ===
- MTA Long Island Bus
  (legal name, no longer used: Metropolitan Suburban Bus Authority)
  From January 1, 2012, this division was operated by Veolia Transport (now Transdev, Inc.) as Nassau Inter-County Express.
- Metropolitan Airports Authority: Operated Republic Airport and Stewart Airport from 1969 to 1981. Spun off from the MTA by Governor Carey.

== Governance ==
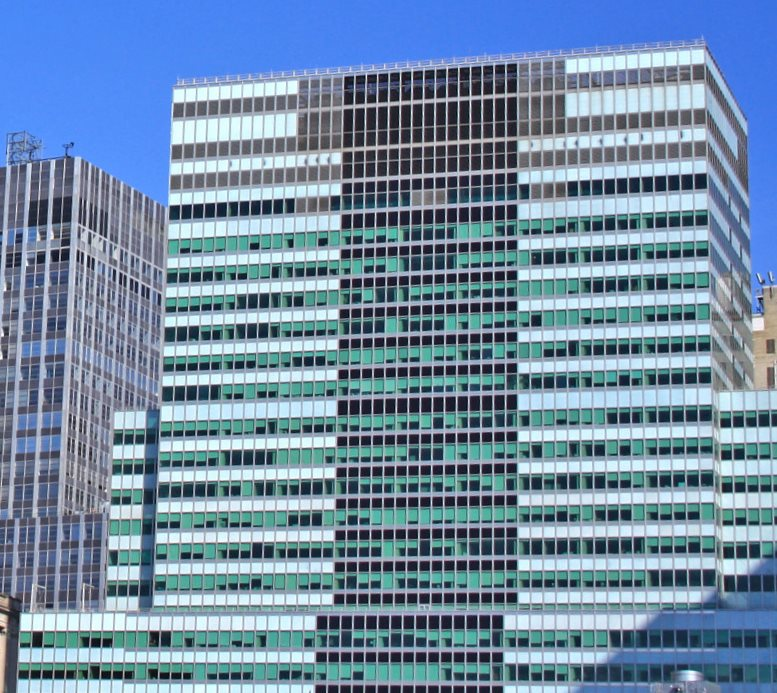
MTA headquarters, 2 Broadway

The MTA is governed by a 21-member board representing the five boroughs of New York City, each of the counties in its New York State service area, and worker and rider interest groups. Of these, there are 14 voting members, broken down into 13 board members who cast individual votes, 4 board members who cast a single collective vote, and 6 group representatives who do not vote.

Five members as well as the chairman/CEO are directly nominated by the governor of New York, while four are recommended by New York City's mayor. The county executives of Nassau, Suffolk and Westchester counties nominate one member each. Each of these members has one vote. The county executives of Dutchess, Orange, Rockland, and Putnam counties also nominate one member each, but these members cast one collective vote. The Board has six rotating nonvoting seats held by representatives of MTA employee organized labor and the Permanent Citizens Advisory Committee, which represent customers of MTA transit and commuter facilities. Board members are confirmed by the New York State Senate.

In 2017, the MTA had operating expenses of $16.85 billion, an outstanding debt of $38.083 billion, and a level of staffing of 79,832 people (staff compensation totaled $6.762 billion). It collects revenue from passenger fees and from a Metropolitan Commuter Transportation Mobility Tax, a payroll tax levied on employers in the 12-county area served by the MTA.

=== Board chair position ===
Historically, some but not all chairmen of the MTA Board have also held the chief executive officer role, with the chairman providing an advisory and policy role and the executive director running day-to-day operations. The roles were combined in 2009 following the recommendation a commission to study capital spending. The commission was appointed by then-governor David Paterson and run by former chairman Richard Ravitch However, following Thomas Prendergast's retirement in 2017, they were split back again. The positions were merged back into one position in 2019 when Pat Foye was appointed Chairman & Chief Executive Officer. The current chairman, Janno Lieber, holds both positions.

The following is a list of chairmen of the authority:

	Name	Also CEO?	Tenure	Appointed by
1	William Ronan		March 1, 1968 – April 26, 1974	Nelson Rockefeller
2	David L. Yunich		May 2, 1974 – January 21, 1977	Malcolm Wilson
3	Harold L. Fisher		January 22, 1977 – November 16, 1979	Hugh Carey
4	Richard Ravitch	Yes	November 17, 1979 – October 31, 1983	Hugh Carey
5	Bob Kiley	Yes	November 16, 1983 – January 2, 1991	Mario Cuomo
6	Peter E. Stangl	Yes	April 21, 1991 – May 17, 1995	Mario Cuomo
7	E. Virgil Conway	No	May 18, 1995 – March 9, 2001	George Pataki
8	Peter Kalikow	No	March 13, 2001 – October 22, 2007	George Pataki
9	H. Dale Hemmerdinger	No	October 23, 2007 – September 10, 2009	Eliot Spitzer
10	Jay Walder	Yes	October 5, 2009 – October 21, 2011	David Paterson
11	Joe Lhota	Yes	January 9, 2012 – December 31, 2012	Andrew Cuomo
12	Thomas F. Prendergast	Yes	June 20, 2013 – January 31, 2017	Andrew Cuomo
13	Joe Lhota	No^{a}	June 21, 2017 – November 8, 2018	Andrew Cuomo
14	Pat Foye	Yes	April 1, 2019 – July 29, 2021	Andrew Cuomo
15	Janno Lieber^{b}	Yes	January 20, 2022 – present	Kathy Hochul

=== Board members ===
The following is a list of members of the MTA Board.

Name	Appointed	Recommended by
Andrew Albert	June 2002	New York City Transit Riders Council
Gerard Bringmann		LIRR Commuters Council
Samuel Chu	June 3, 2022	Kathy Hochul, Governor^{c}
Michael Fleischer	June 10, 2020	Marc Molinaro, Dutchess County Executive
Dan Garodnick	March 22, 2024	Eric Adams, Mayor
Randolph Glucksman		Metro-North Commuter Council
Marc Herbst	March 22, 2024	Ed Romaine, Suffolk County Executive
David R. Jones	June 17, 2016	Bill de Blasio, Mayor
Christopher Leathers	April 8, 2025	SMART Union
Janno Lieber, Chair	January 20, 2022	Kathy Hochul, Governor
Blanca P. López	June 3, 2022	George Latimer, Westchester County Executive
David S. Mack	2019	Laura Curran, Nassau County Executive
Haeda B. Mihaltses	April 10, 2019	Andrew Cuomo, Governor
Melva M. Miller		Kathy Hochul, Governor
James O'Donnell		Steve Neuhaus, Orange County Executive
John-Ross Rizzo	June 9, 2023	Kathy Hochul, Governor
Janette Sadik-Khan	July 29, 2026	Zohran Mamdani, Mayor
John Samuelsen	June 17, 2016	Transport Workers Union Local 100
Lisa Sorin	June 3, 2022	Kathy Hochul, Governor
Edward Valente	April 8, 2025	ACRE Union
Neal Zuckerman	July 9, 2016	MaryEllen Odell, Putnam County Executive

=== Notes ===
^{a} Lhota did not serve as CEO in his second stint as chairman, as CEO responsibilities were carried out by Executive Director Ronnie Hakim.
^{b} Lieber served as chair and CEO in an acting capacity from July 30, 2021, to January 19, 2022.
^{c} Originally appointed by Suffolk County Executive Steve Bellone, reappointed by Hochul on March 20, 2024

== MTA Police Department ==
The Metropolitan Transportation Authority Police Department (MTAPD) is a division of the MTA. MTA police officers are fully empowered under the New York State Public Authorities Law and are commissioned in the state of Connecticut. Their geographic area of employment extends to all counties in New York served by the Metropolitan Transportation Authority, giving officers the ability to exercise full police authority within the counties of Dutchess, Putnam, Orange, Rockland, Westchester, Nassau, Suffolk, and in New York City.

The New York City subways are mainly patrolled by the NYPD Transit Bureau under contract since 1994. Since 2019, the MTA Police Department has conducted daily subway patrols in New York City in an effort to assist the NYPD in addressing quality-of-life issues, like homelessness, that affect commuter safety.

=== Power and authority ===
MTAPD officers are New York State police officers according to New York State Criminal Procedure Law, §1.20(34) meaning they have police powers in all of New York State.

=== History ===
The department was formed on January 1, 1998, with the consolidation of the Long Island Rail Road Police Department and the Metro-North Railroad Police Department. Since the September 11 terrorist attacks, the department has expanded in size and has ramped up dramatically its counter-terrorism capabilities, adding K-9 teams and emergency services officers. There is one lieutenant, four sergeants, and 44 police officers who are assigned to the K-9 Unit and serve as handlers with their canine partners. The department has one of the best trained K-9 units in the United States. At a national competition in 2013, two MTA Police dogs took third and fourth place in explosives detection.

Currently, training for new recruits is conducted at the New York City Police Academy. After successfully completing the academy curriculum, officers are further trained in Connecticut law and law enforcement procedures.

=== Staten Island Railway ===
On June 1, 2005, the Staten Island Rapid Transit Police Department, with 25 officers, was merged into the MTA Police Department. The Staten Island Rapid Transit Police Department was responsible for policing the Staten Island Rapid Transit System in the borough of Staten Island in New York City. This was the final step in consolidating MTA agency law enforcement, and increased the total workforce of the department to 716, including civilians.

=== New York City Subway ===
On September 12, 2019, the MTA announced the addition of 500 MTAPD officers to patrol the New York City Subway, nearly doubling the 783 officers previously employed by the MTAPD. This came shortly after Governor Andrew Cuomo directed the MTA to solve the issue of homelessness in the subway system.

After criticism of multiple high-profile arrests, multiple MTA board members expressed concerns over the added police presence, citing the high cost of personnel, estimated at $249 million over four years.

=== Bridges and Tunnels ===
In early 2025, the MTA Police Department expanded its Highway Unit to oversee MTA Bridges and Tunnels (TBTA) crossings, including toll enforcement, traffic management, commercial vehicle safety, and emergency response. The TBTA maintains a separate law enforcement agency, the TBTA Law Enforcement Division, which employs about 50 "bridge and tunnel officers" who are armed and sworn New York State peace officers.

== MTA Inspector General ==
The Office of the MTA Inspector General (OIG), founded in 1983, is the independent Office of Inspector General specific to the MTA that is responsible for conducting monitoring and oversight of MTA activities, programs, and employees.

== Apps ==
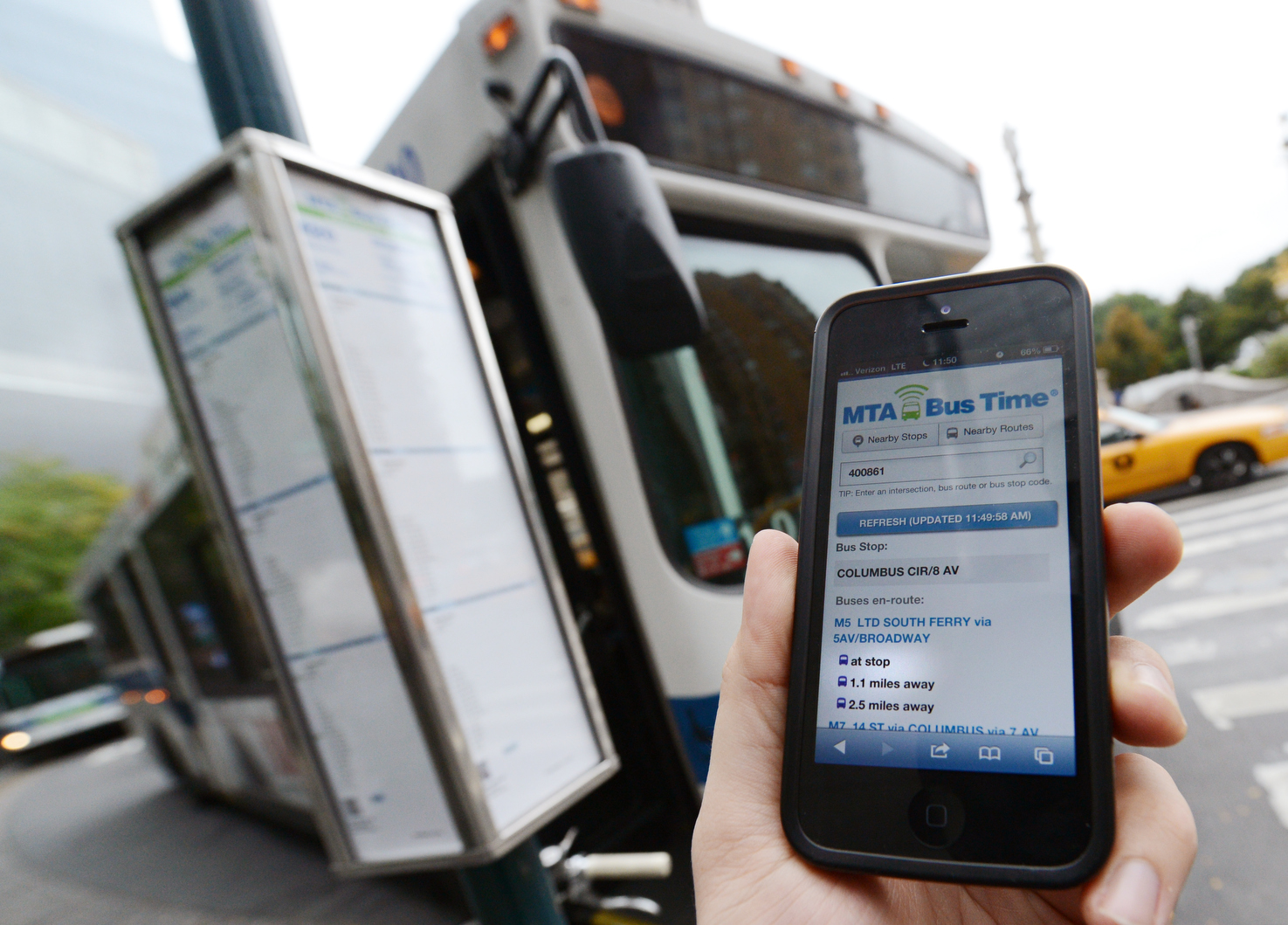
MTA Bus Time app on an iPhone

The MTA has developed several official web and mobile apps for its services, and also provides data to private app developers to create their own unofficial MTA apps. In 2012, the MTA officially released the Subway Time app, which uses subway countdown clock data to determine the next-train arrival times on seven services. Real-time station information for the "mainline" A Division (numbered routes), comprising all numbered services except the 7 train, was made available to third-party developers via an API. This was achieved through both the Subway Time mobile app and as open data. In early 2014, data for the L train were also given to developers. When Bluetooth-enabled countdown clocks were installed in the B Division (lettered services) in 2016 and 2017, they were also configured to feed data to the Subway Time app as well as in an open-data format.

MTA's Bus Time app originated as a pilot program to install bus countdown clocks along the M16 and M34 routes in August 2009. At the same time, many new buses were retrofitted with GPS-enabled automatic vehicle location systems. In October 2010, the developers of the buses' GPS devices implemented the MTA system's first bus-tracking app, which monitored buses along the M16 and M34 routes. This evolved into the current web app, which originally tracked buses along the B63 route in Brooklyn when it started in February 2011. By January 2012, every local and express bus in Staten Island was equipped with the system. The M34 corridor began using the system on April 6, 2012 with nearly every Bronx bus route using the system by the end of 2012. All five boroughs of the city used the system by March 2014, and a mobile app was released in 2015.

In 2011, the MTA began to look at ways of displaying service disruptions due to weekend engineering works in a visual format. In September 2011, the MTA introduced a Vignelli-style interactive subway map, "The Weekender", to its website. The web app provided a way for riders to get information about any planned work, from late Friday night to early Monday morning, that is going on either on a service(s) or station(s) of the subway during the weekends. In June 2012, the MTA duplicated "The Weekender" site as a free mobile app download for iOS. In November 2012, an Android version of the app was released.

The MTA announced plans to integrate all three apps in 2017. The combined app, which was scheduled for release in 2018, would include real-time arrival information for all subway and bus routes, as well as weekend service changes and travel planners. In April 2018, the MTA started testing the MTA App, which was called MYmta at the time. This provided arrival information for MTA railroad, subway, and bus routes; escalator and elevator outage information; and real-time service changes. The app also includes an improved version of the MTA's Trip Planner; whereas the existing Trip Planner can only plan trips along MTA-operated modes of transportation, MTA app's Trip Planner can also suggest routes via other operators such as the Staten Island Ferry, NYC Ferry, PATH, and NJ Transit. A beta version of MTA App was released to the general public in July of that year. In future versions of the MTA app, the MTA planned to integrate the eTix functionality, as well as make it easier for Access-A-Ride customers to view when their vehicle will arrive at a certain point.

In October 2020, the MTA unveiled a new digital map providing real-time arrival estimates and service updates. It was developed pro bono by technology and design company Work & Co.

== Fare collection ==
The subway, buses, and Staten Island Railway charge a single flat fare for each trip, regardless of time or distance traveled. From the MTA's inception until 2003, the agency collected subway and bus fares via a series of small metal tokens. The MTA cycled through several series of tokens throughout the late 20th century. In 1993, MTA started testing the MetroCard, a magnetic stripe card that would replace the tokens used to pay fares. By 1997, the entire bus and subway system accepted MetroCard, and tokens were no longer accepted for fare payment in 2003.

A different fare payment system is used on the LIRR and Metro-North. Both railroads sell tickets based on geographical "zones" and time of day, charging peak and off-peak fares. Tickets may be bought from a ticket office at stations, ticket vending machines (TVMs), online through the "WebTicket" program, or through apps for iOS and Android devices.

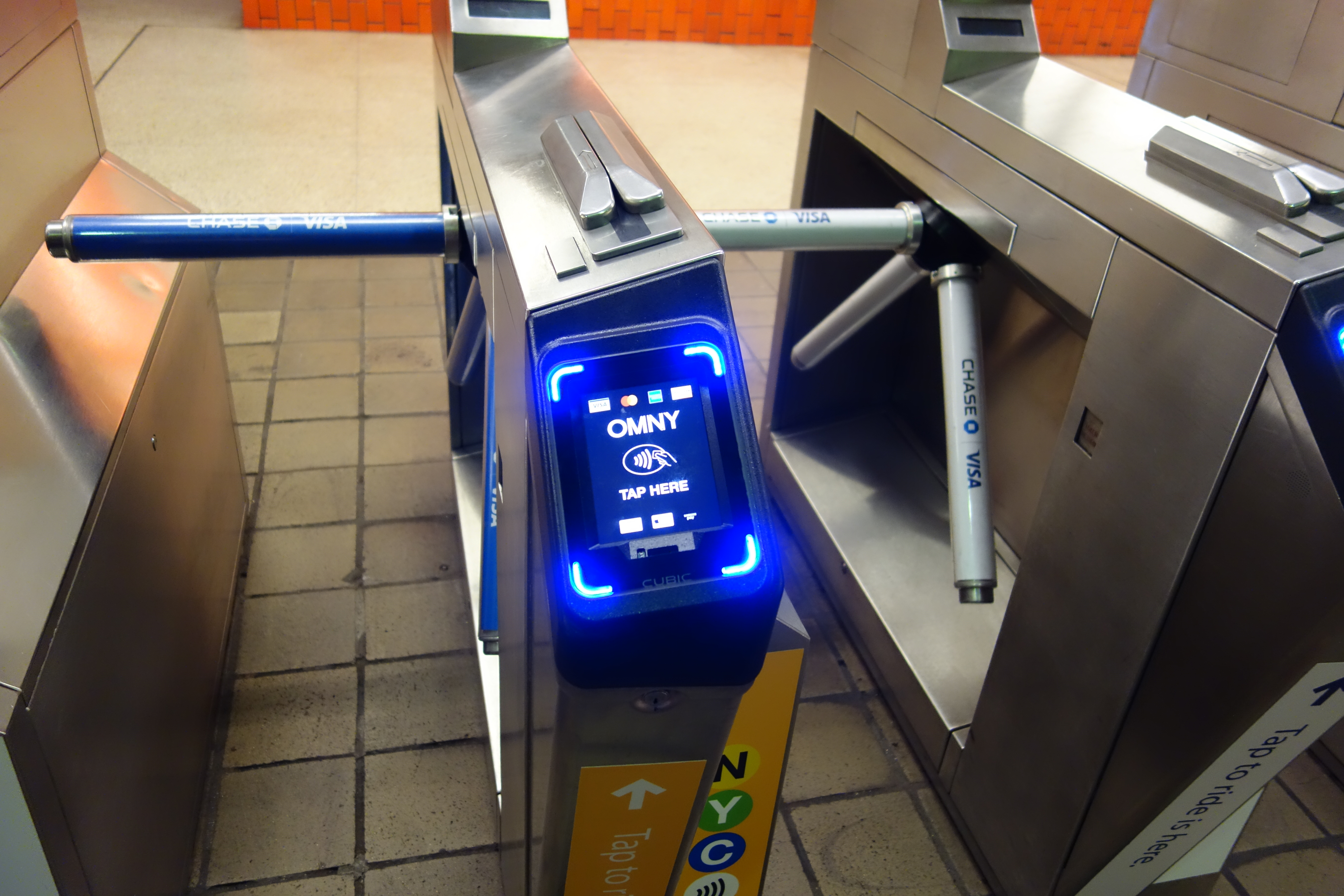
OMNY payment system for subway trains

In 2017, it was announced that the MetroCard would be phased out and replaced by OMNY, a contactless payment system, with fare payment being made using Apple Pay, Google Wallet, Samsung Pay, and debit/credit cards with near-field communication enabled, or radio-frequency identification cards. As of December 31, 2020, the entire bus and subway system is OMNY-enabled. However, support of the MetroCard is slated to remain until at least 2025. MTA also plans to use OMNY in the LIRR and Metro-North.

=== Ghost plates on bridges and tunnels ===
The MTA reported a 12.6 percent increase in toll evasion on New York City bridges and tunnels during the first four months of 2024. This equates to an average of 398,975 missed monthly toll transactions, primarily due to drivers obscuring their license plate. The MTA estimates that this evasion costs the agency approximately $50 million annually. Of the unbillable toll transactions, roughly 80,000 per month are attributed to fake or unreadable license plates, while 155,000 are due to obstructed plates. Unregistered or temporary plates primarily cause the remaining balance.

== Issues ==
=== Expenses ===
==== Budget gaps ====
The budget deficit of the MTA is a growing crisis for the organization as well as for New York City and State residents and governments. The MTA held $31 billion in debt in 2010 and it also suffered from a $900 million gap in its operating budget for 2011. The capital budget, which covers repairs, technological upgrades, new trains, and expansions, is currently $15 billion short of what the MTA states it needs. If this is not funded, the MTA will fund the repairs with debt and raise fares to cover repayments.

The MTA has consistently run on a deficit, but increased spending in 2000–04 coupled with the economic downturn led to a severe increase in the financial burden that the MTA bore. The budget problems stem from multiple sources. The MTA cannot be supported solely by rider fares and road tolls. In the preliminary 2011 budget, MTA forecasted operating revenue totaled at $6.5 billion, amount to only 50% of the $13 billion operating expenses. Therefore, the MTA must rely on other sources of funding to remain operational. Revenue collected from real estate taxes for transportation purposes helped to contain the deficit. However, due to the weak economy and unstable real estate market, money from these taxes severely decreased; in 2010, tax revenue fell at least 20% short of the projected value. Beyond this, steadily reducing support from city and state governments led to borrowing money by issuing bonds, which contributed heavily to the debt.

This budget deficit has resulted in various problems, mainly concentrated in New York City. New York City Subway fares have been increased five times since 2008, with the most recent changes occurring January 4, 2026, raising single-ride fares from $2.90 to $3.00, and express service from $7.00 to $7.25. Each fare raise was met with increasing resistance by MTA customers, and many are beginning to find the fare increases prohibitive. 2010 also saw heavy service cuts for many MTA subsidiaries. Fewer trains spaced farther between resulted in heavy overcrowding beyond normal rush hours, leading to frustration for many subway and bus riders. In 2013, the subway had the highest ridership since 1947. MTA employees also suffered due to the budget issues. By mid-July 2010, MTA layoffs had reached over 1,000, and many of those affected were low-level employees who made less than $55,000 annually.

As of 2015, the MTA was running a $15 billion deficit in its $32 billion 2015–2019 Capital Plan. Without extra funding, many necessary construction and renovation projects would not be performed. In October 2015, the MTA passed the $29 billion 2015–2019 Capital Plan, the largest capital plan in MTA's history; it will be funded by federal, state and city government as well as riders' fares and tolls. Three months later, New York governor Andrew Cuomo and MTA chairman Thomas Prendergast unveiled their plan to spend $26 billion to modernize the subway network, which includes adding Wi-Fi and cellphone services throughout all 278 underground stations by the end of 2016. Other plans call for making extensive renovations to 30 subway stations, allowing mobile ticketing by cellphone or bank cards, and adding security cameras on buses, charging stations for electronics, and more countdown clocks. Roughly $3 billion will be spent to improve bridges and tunnels.

During the COVID-19 pandemic in New York City, following a 50% to 90% drop in ridership on all of the MTA's systems, the agency requested $4 billion in federal funds, since the decreased fare revenue left the already-struggling agency in a financially tenuous position. After the subway was temporarily shuttered at night starting in May 2020, trains and stations were cleaned more than usual. Over 132 employees died of COVID-19 as of June 2020.

On February 1, 2023, as part of her Executive Budget proposal to the New York State Legislature, Governor Kathy Hochul proposed raising the MTA payroll tax, a move projected to increase revenue by $800 million, and also giving the MTA some of the money from casinos expected at present to be licensed soon for business in Manhattan.

==== Reasons for high costs ====
On November 18, 2017, The New York Times published an investigation into the problems underlying the MTA. It found that politicians from both the Democratic and Republican parties, at the mayoral and gubernatorial levels, had gradually removed $1.5 billion of MTA funding. Other actions by city and state politicians, according to the Times, included overspending; overpaying unions and interest groups; advertising superficial improvement projects while ignoring more important infrastructure; and agreeing to high-interest loans that would have been unnecessary without their other interventions. The Times stressed that no single event directly caused the crisis; rather, it was an accumulation of small cutbacks and maintenance deferments. The MTA funds were described as a "piggy bank" for the state, with the issuance of MTA bonds benefiting the state at the MTA's expense. By 2017, a sixth of the MTA's budget was allocated to paying off debt, a threefold increase from the proportion in 1997. The city's $250 million annual contribution to the MTA budget in 2017 was a quarter of the contribution in 1990. David L. Gunn, who helped end a transit crisis when he led the NYCTA in the mid-1980s, described the 2017 crisis as "heartbreaking".

In December of the same year, the Times reported that the $12 billion East Side Access project, which would extend the LIRR to Grand Central Terminal upon its completion, was the most expensive of its kind in the world, with a projected price of $3.5 billion per mile of track. Over the years, the projected cost of East Side Access had risen by billions of dollars due to unnecessary expenses. In addition to overpaying workers and overspending, politicians and trade unions had forced the MTA to hire more workers than was needed. In 2010, an accountant found that the project was hiring 200 extra workers, at a cost of $1,000 per worker per day, for no apparent reason. The bidding process for MTA construction contracts also raised costs because, in some cases, only one or two contractors would bid on a project. Similar construction projects in New York City, such as the Second Avenue Subway and 7 Subway Extension, had been more expensive than comparable projects elsewhere for the same reasons, even though other cities' transit systems faced similar, or greater, problems compared to the MTA. In March 2018, the federal Government Accountability Office ordered an audit of the United States' transit costs, which were generally higher than in any other developed country in the world. The GAO planned to devote special attention to the MTA's transit costs.

The MTA has long struggled to control costs due to contracting fraud and corruption. In 2012, MTA executive Mario Guerra attempted to secure a job with train manufacturer Bombardier while evaluating their bid for a $600 million project. Paresh Patel, an MTA manager responsible for the oversight of repair contracts in the aftermath of Hurricane Sandy, created and awarded contracts to his own engineering firm staffed with friends with few formal qualifications in engineering. After deleting thousands of company emails, Patel pleaded guilty to obstructing federal bid rigging and fraud investigations in March 2020. In 2022, construction manager Ramnarace Mahabir was found to have provided jobs for family members through the routing of $18 million in bus depot contracts. At one 2018 board meeting, an MTA executive explicitly noted the sentiment that the authority is willing to assign jobs to contractors with prior histories of corruption.

=== Advertisement bans ===
The MTA collected $707 million from advertising on its trains and buses in 2018. In June 1992, the MTA banned tobacco advertising on subways, buses and commuter rail, costing the agency $4.5 million in annual advertising revenue. The tobacco advertisements were removed once the advertising contracts expired. They were removed from subways, buses, and bus shelters by the start of 1993, from the commuter rail lines by the start of 1994, and from Long Island Bus vehicles by the start of 1997.

The MTA refused to display an ad in the New York City Subway system in 2012, which read: "In any war between the civilized man and the savage, support the civilized man. Support Israel. Defeat Jihad." The authority's decision was overturned in July 2012 when Judge Paul A. Engelmayer of the United States District Court for the Southern District of New York ruled that the ad of the American Freedom Defense Initiative is protected speech under the First Amendment, and that the MTA's actions were unconstitutional. The judge held in a 35-page opinion that the rejected ad was "not only protected speech — it is core political speech ... [which as such] is afforded the highest level of protection under the First Amendment." The MTA had received $116.4 million in revenue in 2011 from advertising sold throughout its subway, commuter rail, and bus systems.

In April 2015, another ad became the subject of controversy when the MTA refused to display it, the refusal was again challenged in court, and the MTA again lost in court and was ordered by a federal judge to display the ad. The ad, paid for by the American Freedom Defense Initiative, showed a man with a scarf covering his face, with the caption "Killing Jews is Worship that draws us close to Allah", which was attributed to "Hamas MTV," and then stated: "That's His Jihad. What's yours?" The ad included a disclaimer that the display of the ad did not reflect the opinion of the MTA. U.S. District Judge John Koeltl of the US District Court for the Southern District of New York in Manhattan said the ad was protected speech under the First Amendment of the U.S. Constitution, and rejected the MTA's argument that the ad might endorse terrorism or violence. Pamela Geller, president of the group that sued the MTA in order to run the ads, lauded the decision, and a lawyer for the organization said the same decision had been made in Washington and Philadelphia.

A week afterward, the MTA's board in a 9–2 vote banned all political, religious, and opinion advertisements on subways and buses, limiting any ads to commercial ones. Specifically, it banned advertisements that "prominently or predominately advocate or express a political message" about "disputed economic, political, moral, religious or social issues," and any ad that "promotes or opposes" a political party, ballot referendum, and "the election of any candidate". The board estimated that the ads that the board was banning made up less than $1 million of the MTA's advertising revenue of $138 million in 2014. Nevertheless, lawyers for the American Freedom Defense Initiative called the MTA's action a "disingenuous attempt to circumvent" the judge's order.

Another controversy regarding MTA ads arose in 2018. After initially rejecting proposed advertisements from Unbound, a sex-toy retailer, the MTA allowed the ads. Previous advertisement proposals from companies, such as female-hygiene retailer Thinx's ad proposal in 2015, had been rejected and later approved due to "dissemination of indecent material to minors" and "public display[s] of offensive sexual material."

=== 2017–2021 transit crisis ===
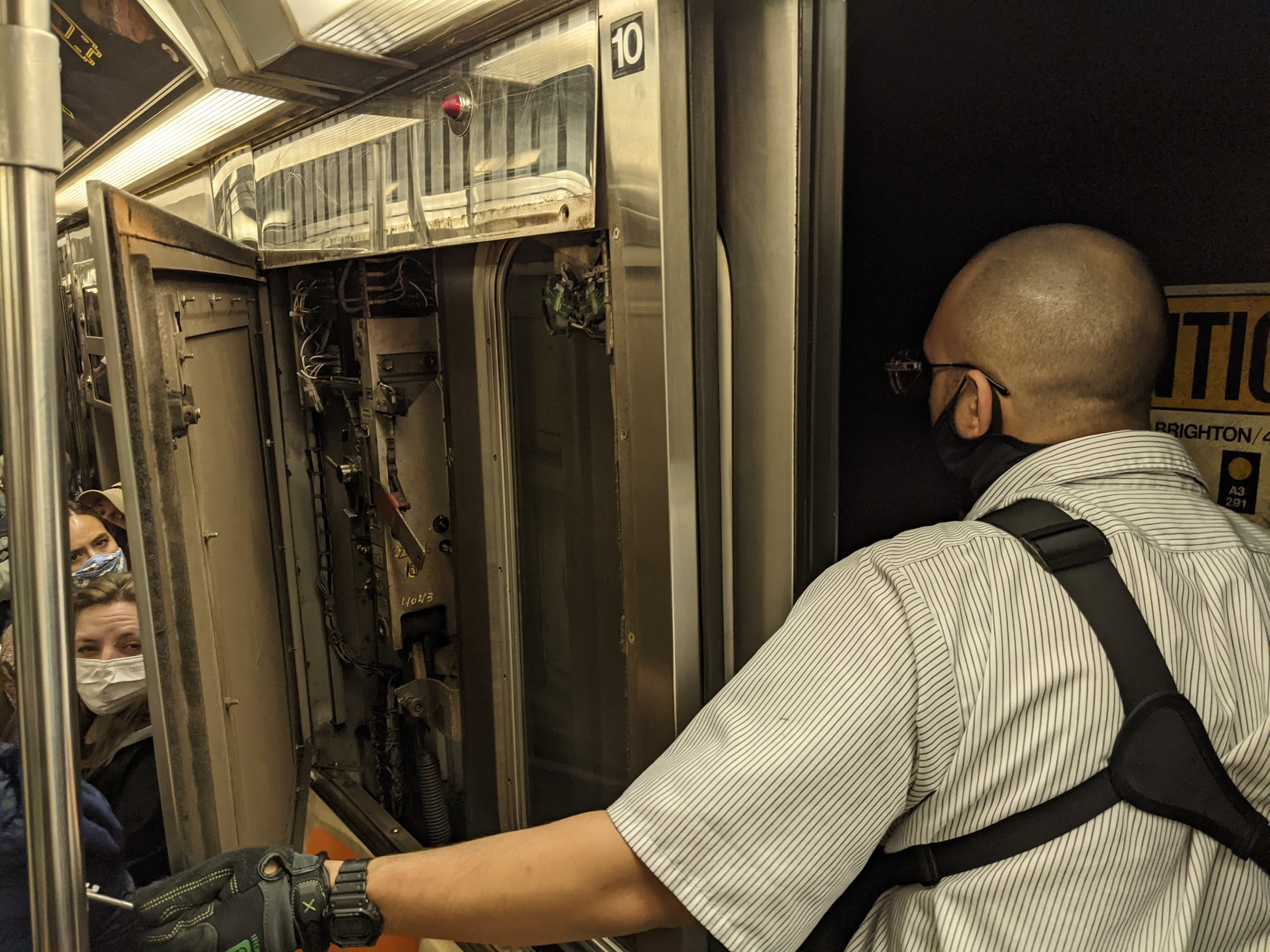
An MTA employee performs maintenance on a B Train bound for Brighton Beach after a brake malfunction, October 2021.

In June 2017, New York governor Andrew Cuomo declared a state of emergency for the MTA due to ongoing reliability and crowding problems. This order applied particularly to the New York City Subway, which was the most severely affected by dilapidated infrastructure, causing overcrowding and delays. With many parts of the system approaching or exceeding 100 years of age, general deterioration could be seen in many subway stations. By 2017, only 65% of weekday trains reached their destinations on time, the lowest rate since a transit crisis in the 1970s. A corresponding bus crisis was not covered as heavily in the media, but in November 2017, New York City Comptroller Scott Stringer identified several causes for the bus system's unreliability. The average speeds of New York City buses were found to be 7 to 8 miles per hour (11 to 13 km/h), the slowest of any major bus system nationwide.

== Campaigns ==
=== Safety campaign ===
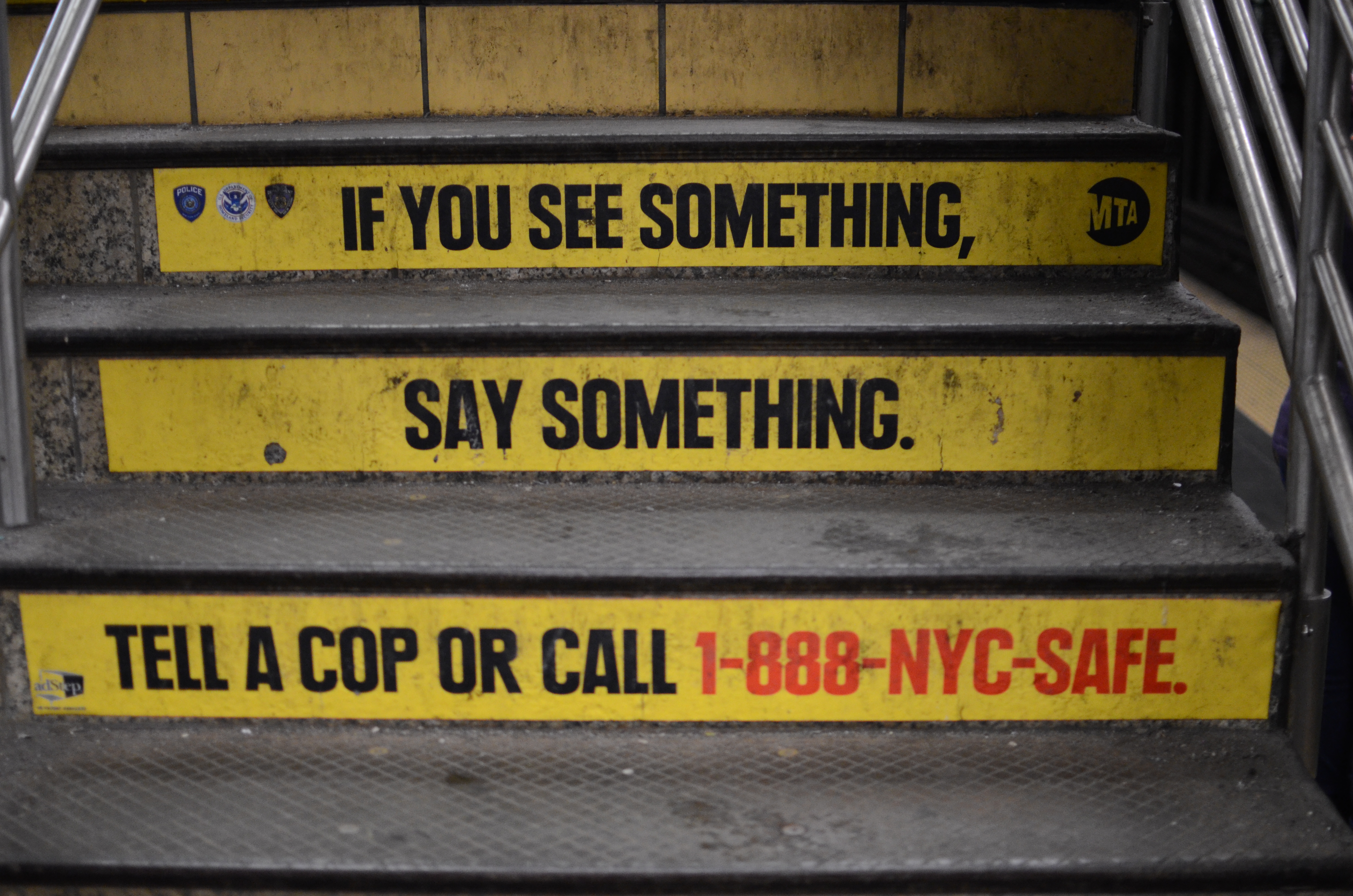
Stairs in the Times Square–42nd Street station with decals with the slogan, "If you see something, say something"

In 2002, following the September 11, 2001, terrorist attacks, the MTA introduced the slogan "If you see something, say something." The campaign, which was based from a theme created by Korey Kay & Partners, consisted of public safety announcements, posted on advertisement boards in stations, subway, buses, and trains, urging people to report suspicious activity. Allen Kay, CEO of Korey Kay and Partners, stated in 2007 that the company had to do a lot of research to ensure that consumers understood the message correctly. Since 2002 the campaign has evolved from simple print ads to television spots, and reports of suspicious packages in the system rose over 40-fold, from 814 in 2002 to over 37,000 in 2003.

The MTA moved to trademark the slogan in 2005. The slogan was used by more than 30 other "transport and governmental" organizations by 2007. That year, the MTA spent $3 million to run 4,000 television ads and 84 newspaper ads in 11 total papers, over a span of more than four months. The idea gained traction, and in 2010, the domestic-security branch of the United States federal government, the United States Department of Homeland Security (DHS), started its own "see something, say something" campaign. Kevin Ortiz, a spokesman for the MTA, described the slogan as having "engaged the public in serving as the eyes and ears of our system."

Meanwhile, the DHS's campaign had attracted at least 215 partners in the private, public, and nonprofit sectors by 2014, which one writer called "a true smart practice." However, the MTA program has not been universally well-received; in 2012, sociologists from New York University and the Illinois Institute of Technology noted that the campaign had not netted any thwarted terrorist plots, and that the sheer volume of calls to the MTA hotline resulted in MTA workers possibly not being able to identify genuine threats.

In 2016, MTA updated the campaign, renaming it "New Yorkers Keep New York Safe." As before, the campaign features public service announcements in advertisement spaces. However, this new campaign now features the pictures, names, and quotes of New Yorkers who called to report suspicious people or things on the MTA's system. The rebooted campaign also shows 15- to 30-second videos of these New Yorkers who speak about their experiences. The two-year "New Yorkers Keep New York Safe" campaign received $2 million of funding from the DHS. The MTA still owns the trademark for "If you see something, say something."

=== Courtesy campaigns ===
In MTA buses, there are stickers plastered on the frontmost seats. The front seats are priority seating, and the stickers state "Won't you please give up your seat to the disabled or elderly" with the "o" in "Won't" replaced with a heart symbol. In 2009, it was codified into an enforceable policy that could be punished with a fine.

Since 2014, the MTA has had a "Courtesy Counts" campaign consisting of posters that show colored stick figures having either correct or incorrect etiquette. Green stick figures show what riders should do, such as taking off their backpacks, while red stick figures show what riders should not do, such as manspreading. All of the posters have the tagline "Courtesy Counts: Manners Make a Better Ride." Starting in January 2015, these posters were installed in subway cars, with the posters coming to commuter rail and buses the following month.

In May 2017, the MTA started a three-month pilot program to encourage riders to give up their seats for the pregnant, disabled, or elderly. It created a website where pregnant women, the disabled, and the elderly could request specialized buttons. There are two designs: a "Baby on Board" button for pregnant mothers and a more generic "Please offer me a seat" button. This idea stemmed from the "Baby on Board" buttons that were given out across the London Underground in 2013 after Catherine, Duchess of Cambridge, wore such a button there.

The MTA launched the "Hate Has No Place in Our Transportation System" campaign in January 2020. This involved placing notices on several thousand subway and bus screens.

=== 2021 onsite COVID-19 vaccinations ===
In May 2021, the MTA operated eight walk-up COVID-19 vaccination sites in subway, Metro-North and Long Island Rail Road stations as part of a five-day pilot project. This pilot project was subsequently extended another week at two stations. Over 11,000 people received the Janssen COVID-19 vaccine as part of the program.

== See also ==
- Transportation in New York City

Other transportation authorities operating in New York state:

- Capital District Transportation Authority, in Capital District, New York
- Central New York Regional Transportation Authority, in Syracuse, New York
- Niagara Frontier Transportation Authority, in Buffalo, New York
- Port Authority of New York and New Jersey, in New York City and northern New Jersey
- Rochester-Genesee Regional Transportation Authority, in Rochester, New York
