= MTA Bus Time =

Vehicle location app for New York City buses

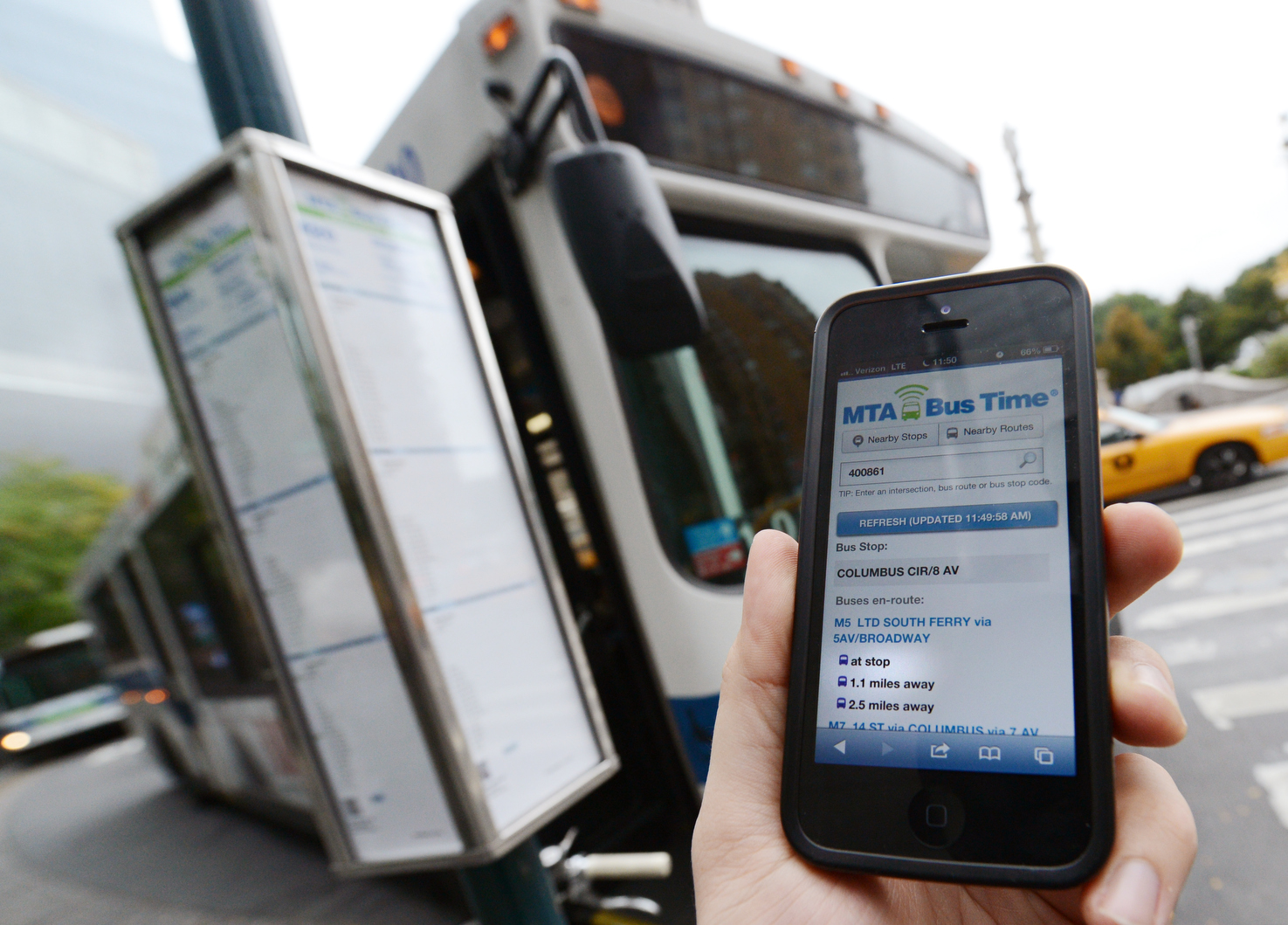
The Bus Time smartphone interface during its Manhattan launch on October 7, 2013

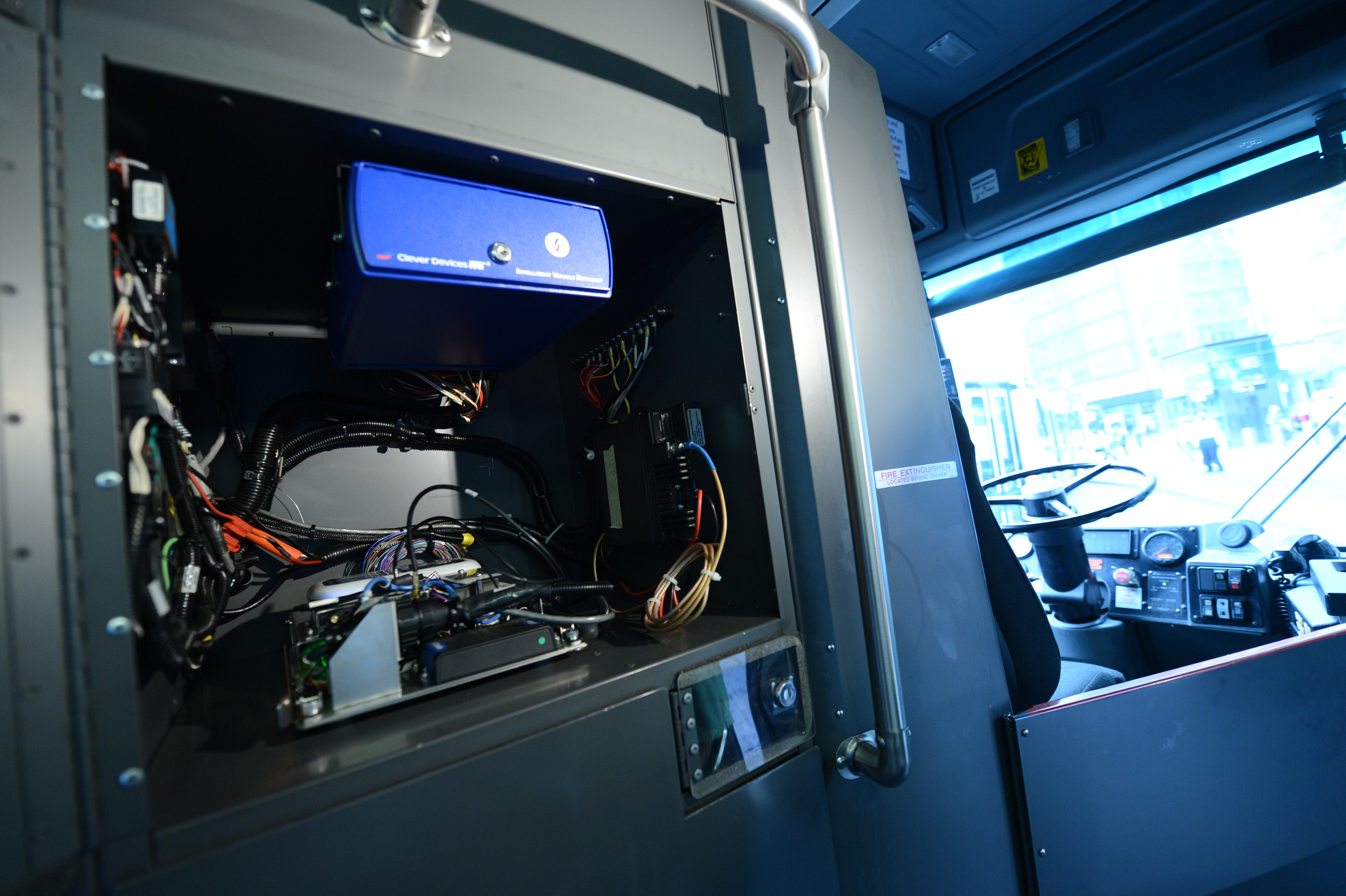
The Bus Time console installed in a bus behind the driver's seat

MTA Bus Time, stylized as BusTime, is a Service Interface for Real Time Information, automatic vehicle location (AVL), and passenger information system provided by the Metropolitan Transportation Authority (MTA) of New York City for customers of its bus operations under the New York City Bus and MTA Bus Company brands. First tested in late 2010 and officially launched in early 2011, MTA Bus Time was installed in all MTA bus routes in New York City by 2014.

The software uses Global Positioning System (GPS) technology equipped in buses to relay real-time location information to passengers via internet-enabled devices (particularly smartphones), SMS messages, or countdown clocks installed at bus stops. Since 1996, the MTA had tried to install positioning technology for buses through numerous pilot programs, which were implemented in various stages.

== Usage and software ==
MTA Bus Time allows riders to track the location of buses along a route. On computer browsers, the service uses Google Maps to display bus routes and the position of buses along routes, by typing in a route (e.g. Q22) or intersection into the search box. It will also give the distance (in number of stops or miles) and approximate time away from the next stop for each bus. For web-enabled mobile devices, typing in a route will display the list of stops along the route and the position of buses along it. Typing in an intersection will give a list of buses operating to that stop and the approximate time for the next bus to reach the stop. Intersection information can also be found by scanning the QR code for a stop, or texting the stop's numerical code to receive information via SMS; both codes are found on the Guide-A-Ride box affixed to bus stop signage. Bus Time is also integrated into countdown clocks installed at several bus stops throughout the city, displaying how many stops away the next bus is, to serve riders without internet devices or mobile phones.

The current Bus Time system uses on-board GPS and wireless communication units, at the cost of about $20,000 per vehicle. For most buses, the console is equipped behind the driver's seat. The hardware is provided by two companies, Verifone and Cubic Transportation Systems, with GPS devices supplied by Trimble Navigation, and open source software called OneBusAway. The Verifone system is the successor to a pilot "Smart Card" payment system developed along with MasterCard. Cambridge Systematics was also involved in the development. The MTA uses the same servers as Amazon.com. The technology is similar to the technology used for countdown clocks found in the New York City Subway system (called Subway Time).

Bus Time is also used by the MTA to create performance reports for bus routes, and by bus dispatchers and managers to monitor and improve service. This technology is called Bus Trek.

== History ==
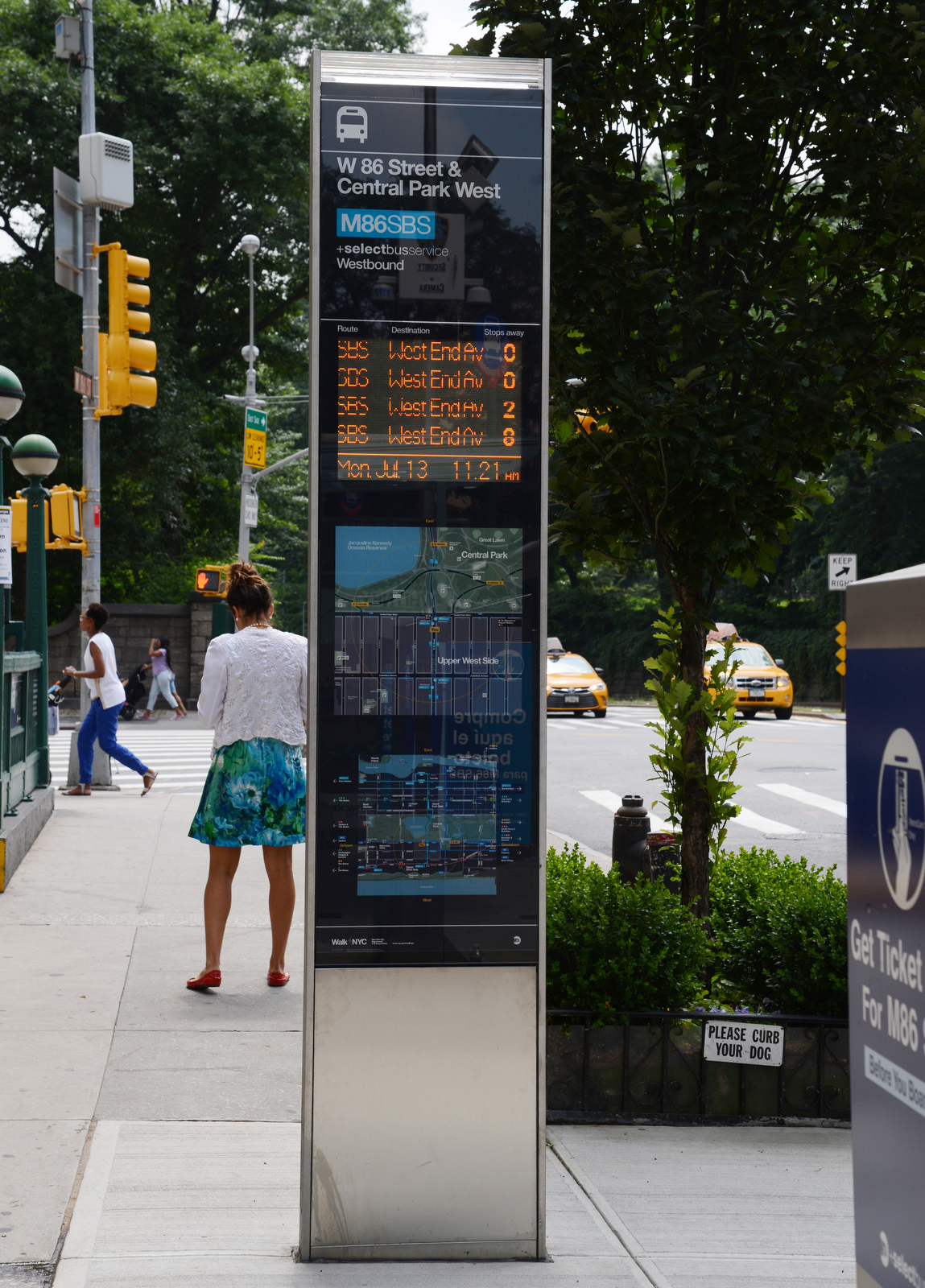
A Select Bus Service wayfinding countdown clock, part of WalkNYC, during the debut of the M86 SBS in 2015

The mass transit system of New York City did not have any sort of arrival-time information system prior to the installation of the first subway and bus countdown clocks in the 2000s. Many other major cities (such as London, Paris, and Washington, D.C.) had used the technology for many years; several American cities such as Chicago, San Francisco, and Portland, Oregon, have also had bus-tracking systems prior to MTA implementation.

In 1979, the MTA tested a radio-based monitoring system on the buses from the Queens Village Depot, called the "Radio-Data-Locator System" and designed by Motorola. The buses automatically communicated their location to the East New York Bus Command Center in East New York, Brooklyn, every 90 seconds. The system was used to improve bus performance and prevent bus bunching, but was not accessible to the public.

In 1996, the MTA's New York City Transit Authority (NYCT) contracted Orbital Sciences Corporation to design a bus-arrival monitoring system, planned to be installed on 170 city buses by 1998. The routes on which it would be implemented were the M15, M31, M35, M57, M66 and M116, which operated out of the 126th Street Depot in Manhattan. In 1997, the MTA awarded a second contract to Orbital to install a tracking system on the Long Island Bus system (now the independent Nassau Inter-County Express). An additional contract was awarded in 1999 for the MTA's Access-A-Ride paratransit service. The system would have included countdown clocks and interactive kiosks at stops, and recorded "next stop" announcements on buses (similar to that of modern subway cars and the still-used Clever Devices system used on the ex-MTA Long Island Bus/NICE Bus units). NYCT Buses would be monitored at the East New York Depot control center, and Long Island buses at a command center in Garden City. After four years, the company had missed most of its deadlines. The technology, meanwhile, was faulty because the skyscrapers in Manhattan blocked signals and the dead reckoning system had failed. The NYCT contract was terminated by the MTA in 2000.

In 1999, the New York City Department of Transportation (NYCDOT) planned to launch a tracking and countdown clock program on the Q60 route (then privately operated under a DOT subsidy by Green Bus Lines) along Queens Boulevard. The DOT planned to put it in operation by 2002. In summer 2005, a $13 million contract was awarded by the MTA to Siemens for a pilot countdown clock program at fifteen stops along the same six bus routes in Manhattan of the previous NYCT program. This project also experienced delays, with the first countdown clocks operational by October 2007. After issues with arrival time accuracy, the clocks were shut down in February 2008, and MTA pulled out of the program in early 2009.

In August 2009, countdown clocks were installed at eight stops for the M34 and M16 crosstown buses along 34th Street in Midtown Manhattan. These clocks were installed at the top of the Cemusa bus shelters at the stops by Long Island-based Clever Devices, which provided the GPS equipment free of charge. The clocks were praised by The New York Times as a "Miracle on 34th Street," a play on the famous film of the same name. Around this time, many new Orion VII NG buses delivered to the MTA were equipped with AVL consoles built by Clever Devices. On October 14, 2010, the first version of the Bus Time web service, also developed by Clever Devices, was launched along the route using the same GPS system. Following the transition of the two routes into the M34 and M34A Select Bus Service in late 2011, the countdown clocks were removed by the contractor in April 2012, and were replaced with the current Bus Time system.

The pilot route for the most recent iteration of MTA Bus Time was the B63 in Brooklyn, where thirty buses were equipped with the technology in February 2011. By January 2012, every local and express bus in Staten Island was equipped with the system. The M34/M34A SBS began using the system on April 6, 2012, with nearly every Bronx bus route using the system by the end of 2012. All five boroughs of the city used the system by March 2014, and a mobile app was released in 2015.

In 2019, the MTA Bus Time and MYmta apps began displaying real-time passenger counts for express buses. This functionality was later expanded to all bus routes and added to the MYmta app in 2020. The MTA removed the real-time passenger counts from the MTA Bus Time app in August 2024, but the counts were restored following objections from customers.
