= M34 and M34A buses =

Bus routes in Manhattan, New York

m34, m34a
- 34th Street Crosstown Line

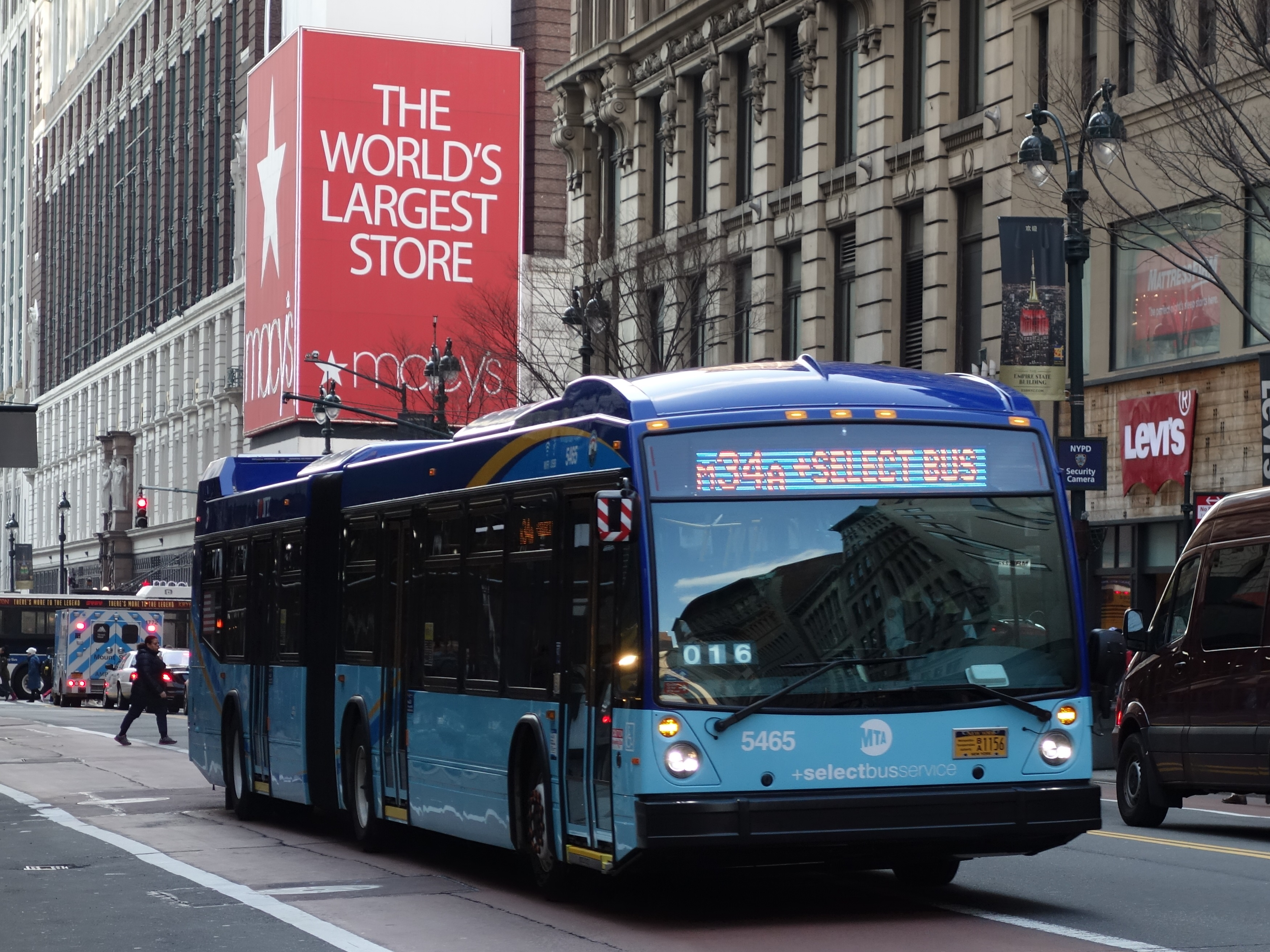
- A 2019 New Flyer XE60 (4951) on the Waterside-FDR Drive-bound M34 in 2026 and a 2017 Nova Bus LFS Articulated (5465) on the Waterside Plaza-bound M34A in 2018

Overview
- System: MTA Regional Bus Operations
- Operator: Manhattan and Bronx Surface Transit Operating Authority
- Garage: Michael J. Quill Depot
- Vehicle: Nova Bus LFS articulated New Flyer Xcelsior XD60; New Flyer Xcelsior XE60 (main vehicles); New Flyer Xcelsior XD40; New Flyer Xcelsior XE40; Nova Bus LFS HEV (supplemental service)
- Livery: Select Bus Service

Route
- Locale: Manhattan, New York, U.S.
- Communities served: Hudson Yards, Hell's Kitchen, Midtown, Murray Hill, Kips Bay, Waterside Plaza
- Start: M34: 34th Street and 12th Avenue; M34A: 43rd Street and 8th Avenue
- Via: 34th Street
- End: M34: FDR Drive and 35th Street; M34A: Waterside Plaza
- Length: M34: 2 miles (3.2 km); M34A: 2.5 miles (4.0 km)

Service
- Operates: 5 a.m. (weekdays) or 6:30 a.m. (weekends) to 12:30 a.m.
- Ridership: 3,055,734 (2025)
- Transfers: Yes
- Timetable: M34/M34A SBS

The 34th Street Crosstown Line is a surface transit line on 34th Street in Manhattan, New York City, United States. It currently hosts the M34/M34A SBS routes of MTA's Regional Bus Operations. The M34 runs from 12th Avenue to FDR Drive via 34th Street, while the M34A runs from Port Authority Bus Terminal to Waterside Plaza.

== Route ==
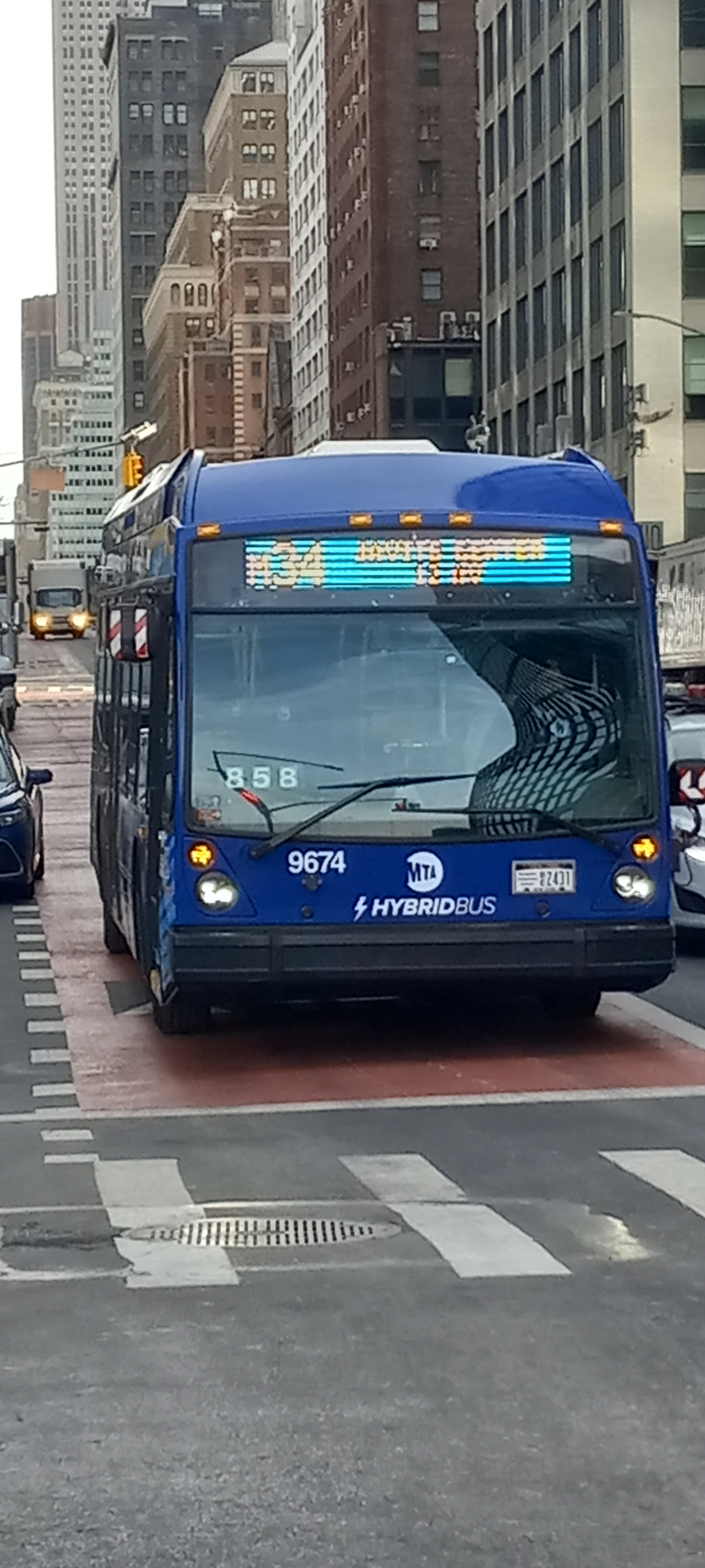
A 2021 Nova Bus LFS HEV (9674) in supplemental service on the Javits Center-bound M34 SBS in Midtown

For most of its length, the M34 uses 34th Street to travel crosstown. There is a one-block stretch of the westbound route, between 11th and 12th Avenues, that runs along 33rd Street; this is because the M34 needs to terminate along the northbound West Side Highway. At its eastern end, the M34 crosses under FDR Drive to terminate on Marginal Street at the East 34th Street Ferry Landing. Westbound buses make a U-turn at 35th Street and travel southbound on the FDR Drive service road for one block.

The M34A uses a different route than the M34 at its western and eastern ends. It travels along Eighth Avenue northbound and Ninth Avenue southbound between 34th Street and 43rd Street (using 43rd Street to terminate westbound), thereby serving the Port Authority Bus Terminal. It also uses Second Avenue southbound and the FDR Drive service road northbound between 23rd Street and 34th Street in order to serve its Waterside Plaza terminus as well as Peter Cooper Village. The eastbound segment of the M34A between Second Avenue and FDR Drive uses 23rd Street.

=== Stops ===
Station Street traveled	Direction	Connections
M34 only
Twelfth Avenue West 34th Street	Westbound terminal, Eastbound stop	NYC Bus: M12 (northbound only)
Eleventh Avenue / Javits Center West 34th Street	Bidirectional	NYC Bus: M12 (southbound only); NYC Subway: trains at 34th Street–Hudson Yards
Hudson Park Boulevard West 34th Street	Westbound	NYC Bus: M12 (southbound only); NYC Subway: trains at 34th Street–Hudson Yards
Tenth Avenue West 34th Street	Eastbound	NYC Bus: M11 (northbound only)
Dyer Avenue West 34th Street	Westbound	NYC Bus: M11 (northbound only)
M34A only
Port Authority Bus Terminal Eighth Avenue	Westbound terminal	NYC Bus: M20, M104 (all buses northbound only); (M42 at 42nd St); Port Authority Bus Terminal; NYC Subway: trains at Times Square–42nd Street trains at 42nd Street–Port Authority Bus Terminal
42nd Street Ninth Avenue	Eastbound station	NYC Bus: M11 (southbound only); M42
40th Street Eighth Avenue	Westbound	NYC Bus: M20, M104 (all buses northbound only); (M42 at 42nd St); Port Authority Bus Terminal; NYC Subway: trains at Times Square–42nd Street trains at 42nd Street–Port Authority Bus Terminal
39th Street Ninth Avenue	Eastbound	NYC Bus: M11 (southbound only)
37th Street Eighth Avenue	Westbound	NYC Bus: M20, M104 (all buses northbound only)
Common Stops
Ninth Avenue West 34th Street	Both routes (EB); M34 (WB)	NYC Bus: M11 (southbound only)
Eighth Avenue / Penn Station / MSG West 34th Street	Bidirectional	NYC Bus: M20 (northbound only); NYC Subway: trains at 34th Street–Penn Station; Penn Station: Amtrak, LIRR and NJ Transit
Seventh Avenue / Penn Station / MSG West 34th Street	Bidirectional	NYC Bus: M7, M20 (all buses southbound only); NYC Subway: trains at 34th Street–Penn Station; Penn Station: Amtrak, LIRR and NJ Transit
Sixth Avenue / Broadway / Herald Square West 34th Street	Bidirectional	NYC Bus: M5, M7, M55 (all buses northbound only); NYC Subway: trains at 34th Street–Herald Square; PATH: HOB – 33, JSQ – 33, JSQ – 33 (via HOB) trains at 33rd Street
Fifth Avenue / Empire State Building East 34th Street	Bidirectional	NYC Bus: M1, M2, M3, M4, M5, M55 (all buses southbound only) MTA Bus: Q32 (all buses southbound only)
Park Avenue East 34th Street	Bidirectional	NYC Bus: M1, M2, M3, M4 (all buses northbound only) at Madison Avenue; M101, M102, M103 (all buses southbound only) at Lexington Avenue MTA Bus: Q32 (all buses northbound only) at Madison Avenue NYC Subway: train at 33rd Street
Third Avenue East 34th Street	Bidirectional	NYC Bus: M101, M102, M103 (all buses northbound only)
Second Avenue East 34th Street	Bidirectional	NYC Bus: M15, M15 SBS (all buses southbound only)
First Avenue East 34th Street	M34 (EB); Both routes (WB)	NYC Bus: M15, M15 SBS (all buses northbound only)
M34A only
28th Street Second Avenue	Eastbound	NYC Bus: M9, M15, M15 SBS (all buses southbound only)
23rd Street Second Avenue	Eastbound	NYC Bus: M9, M15, M15 SBS (all buses southbound only); M23 SBS
First Avenue VA Hospital	Eastbound	NYC Bus: M15, M15 SBS (all buses northbound only); M9, M23 SBS
Avenue C 23rd Street	Eastbound	
Waterside Plaza 25th Street	Eastbound terminal, Westbound stop	
29th Street FDR Drive	Westbound stop	
M34 only
Marginal Street East River Ferry Terminal	Eastbound terminal, Westbound stop	NYC Ferry, Seastreak

== History ==
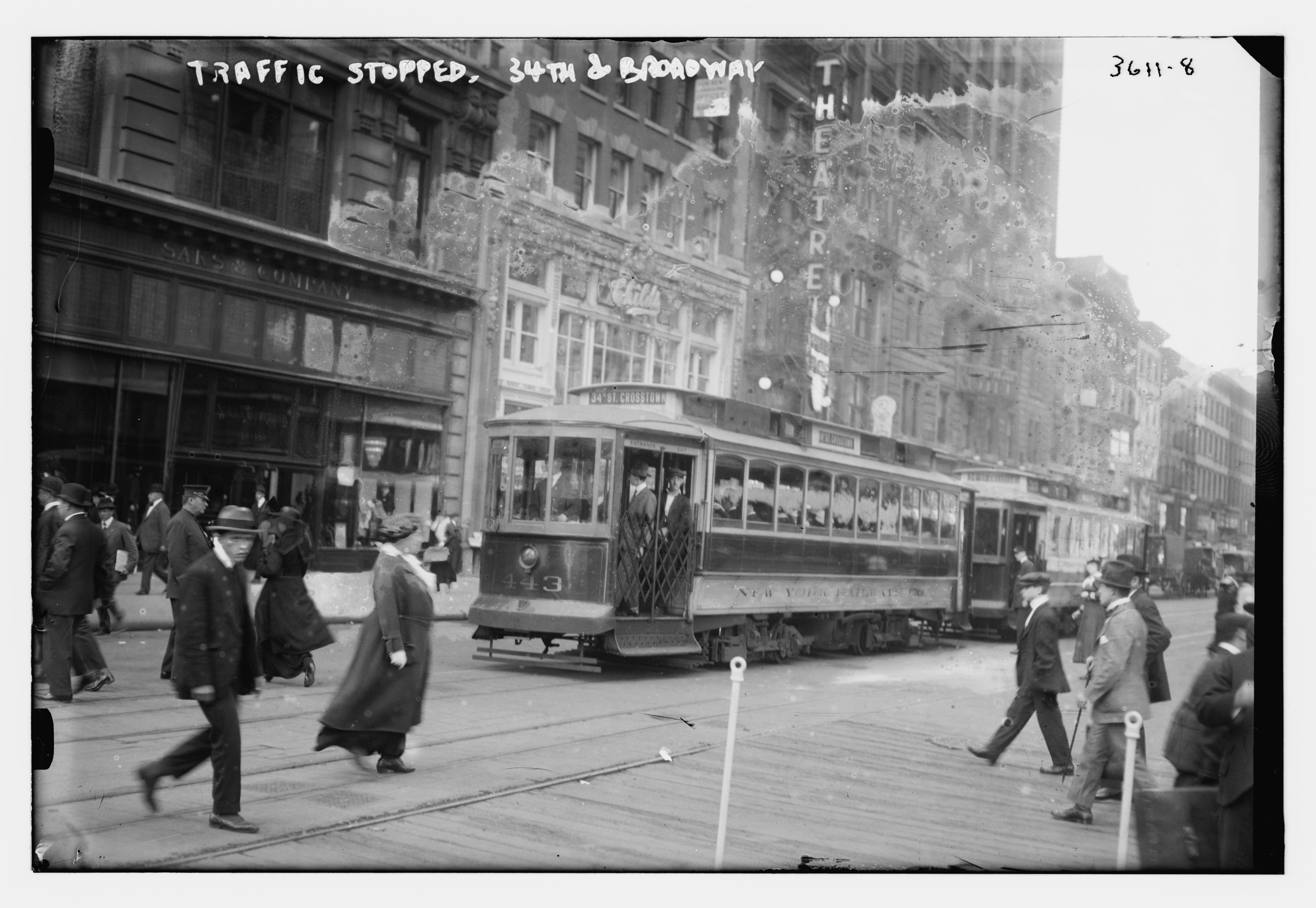
The 34th Street Crosstown Line as a streetcar at Broadway in the early 20th Century.

=== Streetcar line ===
The Thirty-Fourth Street Crosstown Railway was chartered on March 18, 1896, being a consolidation of the Thirty-Fourth Street Railroad Company and the Thirty-Fourth Street Ferry & Eleventh Avenue Railroad. The stock of the company was owned by the Metropolitan Street Railway. The streetcar line was previously a horsecar line, and in July 1900 the line began running via storage batteries, but in September 1903 it was changed to using an underground third rail.

=== Local bus service ===
New York City Omnibus Corporation bus route (M19 - 16) replaced New York Railways' 34th Street Crosstown Line streetcar on April 1, 1936.

A New Flyer XD60 on the M34A SBS+ heading towards Waterside

On July 14, 1965, the directors of the Manhattan and Bronx Surface Transit Operating Authority passed a resolution approving the extension of the route from the terminal of the route at First Avenue and East 34th Street to First Avenue and East 27th Street to serve Bellevue Hospital during late evenings. Buses would run via 34th Street, FDR Drive Service Road, East 25th Street, and First Avenue.

In January 1970, the United States Department of Transportation initiated the Urban Corridor Demonstration Program to test transportation demand management strategies to reduce traffic congestion on radial corridors in large urban areas. Grants were awarded to eleven metropolitan areas to conduct detailed planning for projects in July 1970, and projects in eight of them, including New York, were selected. The New York program would consist of eight projects, including traffic system management of New Jersey Route 3, a study of automatic vehicle identification, joint-use park and ride facilities, a contraflow bus lane along Interstate 495, and the rerouting of portions of two crosstown bus routes in midtown Manhattan with low ridership to better connect high-density job areas with the Port Authority Bus Terminal by eliminating transfers. The first of the two bus reroutings was the rerouting of half of M3 49th/50th Street crosstown buses to the bus terminal in October 1971. The second was the rerouting on June 26, 1972, of some westbound M16 buses from 10th Avenue to 8th Avenue to improve access to the Port Authority Bus Terminal from the east side of Manhattan afternoon.

This new branch of the M16 would run on weekdays between 7 a.m. and 11 p.m.. Eastbound buses would start at 12th Avenue and 42nd Street, head east on 42nd Street, south on Ninth Avenue, and east on 34th Street to First Avenue. Buses would return in westbound service, running north on First Avenue, west on 37th Street, south on Second Avenue, west on 34th Street, north on Eighth Avenue, west on 43rd Street, and south on 12th Avenue to the terminal at 42nd Street. By 1975, the reroute of the M16 branch and the addition of two bus trips increased operating costs, though the tripling of ridership on the Eighth Avenue segment of the route, increasing by 1,300, outweighing the increased costs.

In 1974, buses were extended to serve the new Waterside Plaza housing development. On April 1, 1986, with the opening of the Jacob K. Javits Center at 34th Street and 11th Avenue, the branch to 12th Avenue and 34th Street was renamed the M34. The change had been approved by the New York City Transit Authority Committee of the MTA Board on February 19, 1986.

In April 2001, the Metropolitan Transportation Authority (MTA) announced a planned reroute of the M34 to serve the 34th Street Ferry Terminal. Buses, at the time, eastbound buses had traveled north via First Avenue and turned east onto East 36th Street, where the route terminated, and westbound buses headed east along East 36th Street, south via FDR Drive West Service Road, and west along East 34th Street. To serve the ferry terminal, eastbound service would run east along East 34th Street, over the FDR Drive Service Roads, and turn north into the bus staging area at the pier, and westbound service would leave from the northern end of the terminal area at East 35th Street, turn south on the FDR Drive West Service Road and head west on East 34th Street. The change was to be implemented in April 2001.

In 2010, it was one of seven local bus routes in Manhattan to participate in a PayPass smart card program. This program was a pilot program meant to find a suitable smart card technology to replace the MetroCard.

In August 2010, a program was implemented along the M16 and M34 routes, in which riders could track arriving buses. This later became MTA Bus Time.

=== Select Bus Service ===
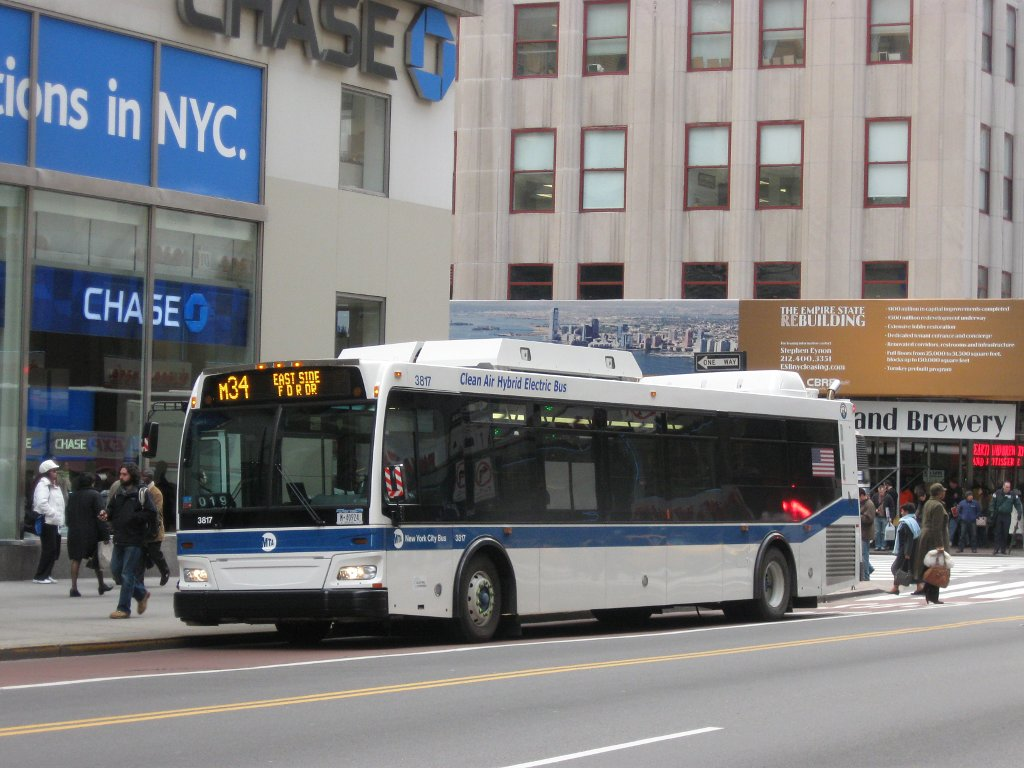
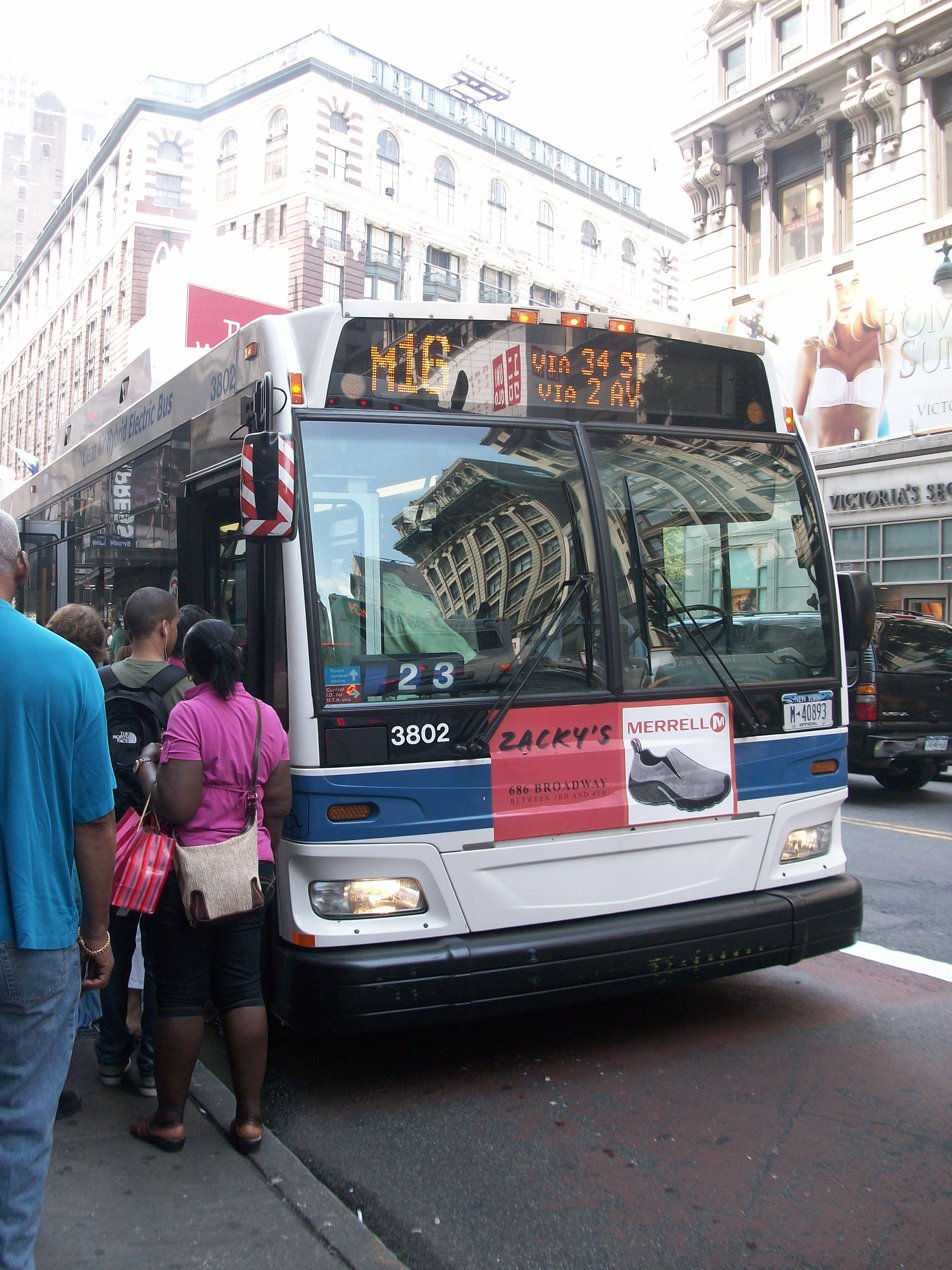
Two 2008 Orion VII NG HEVs: 3817 on the FDR Drive-bound M34 (top) and 3802 on the former Waterside-bound M16 (bottom), prior to SBS implementation.

A blue-liveried 2017 NFI XD60 (6125) on the M34A SBS+ bound for East Side, seen outside of Brookdale Residence

The M34 SBS and M34A SBS routes began on November 13, 2011. Like other Select Bus Service corridors, off-board fare payment is used, as well as all-door boarding. These are considered by the MTA as two SBS services, the M34 34th Street Crosstown and the former M16 route, which was renamed the M34A; the routes share a single corridor. The stops are listed below from west to east. Red-painted bus lanes were installed on 34th Street between First Avenue and Eleventh Avenue. The stops at Madison Avenue and Lexington Avenue were eliminated, the westbound stop at Tenth Avenue was moved to Dyer Avenue, and a stop at West 43rd Street near Ninth Avenue was moved consolidated with a stop at 42nd Street near that avenue. A part-time stop at West 38th Street and Ninth Avenue was moved to West 39th Street.

On April 8, 2012, as part of a pilot program that expanded on the 2010 pilot, MTA Bus Time was phased into this route. In April 2012, weekend service on the route was increased.

Starting in early 2013, bus bulbs were installed at twelve locations along 34th Street, allowing buses to stay in the bus lane while stopping. In November 2015, the section between Lexington Avenue and Seventh Avenue was completed with the installation of four new bus bulbs, resurfaced streets, new parking spaces, and newly painted bus lanes. The portion between 12th Avenue and Lexington Avenue included the construction of eight bus bulbs at bus stops and one curb extension. The remaining segment, between Lexington Avenue and the FDR Drive Service Road is expected to be completed by December 2016. The remaining portion would install three bus bulbs at bus stops and would build two curb extensions. The entire cost of the project is $27 million. In its first year of operation, there has been 23 percent time savings. Since 2011, there has been 12 percent ridership growth on the route, while overall, bus ridership has been decreasing in Manhattan. Alternate trips on the M34 to and from Waterside Plaza were added on September 3, 2017.
