= MTA (app) =

Mobile app for transit in New York City

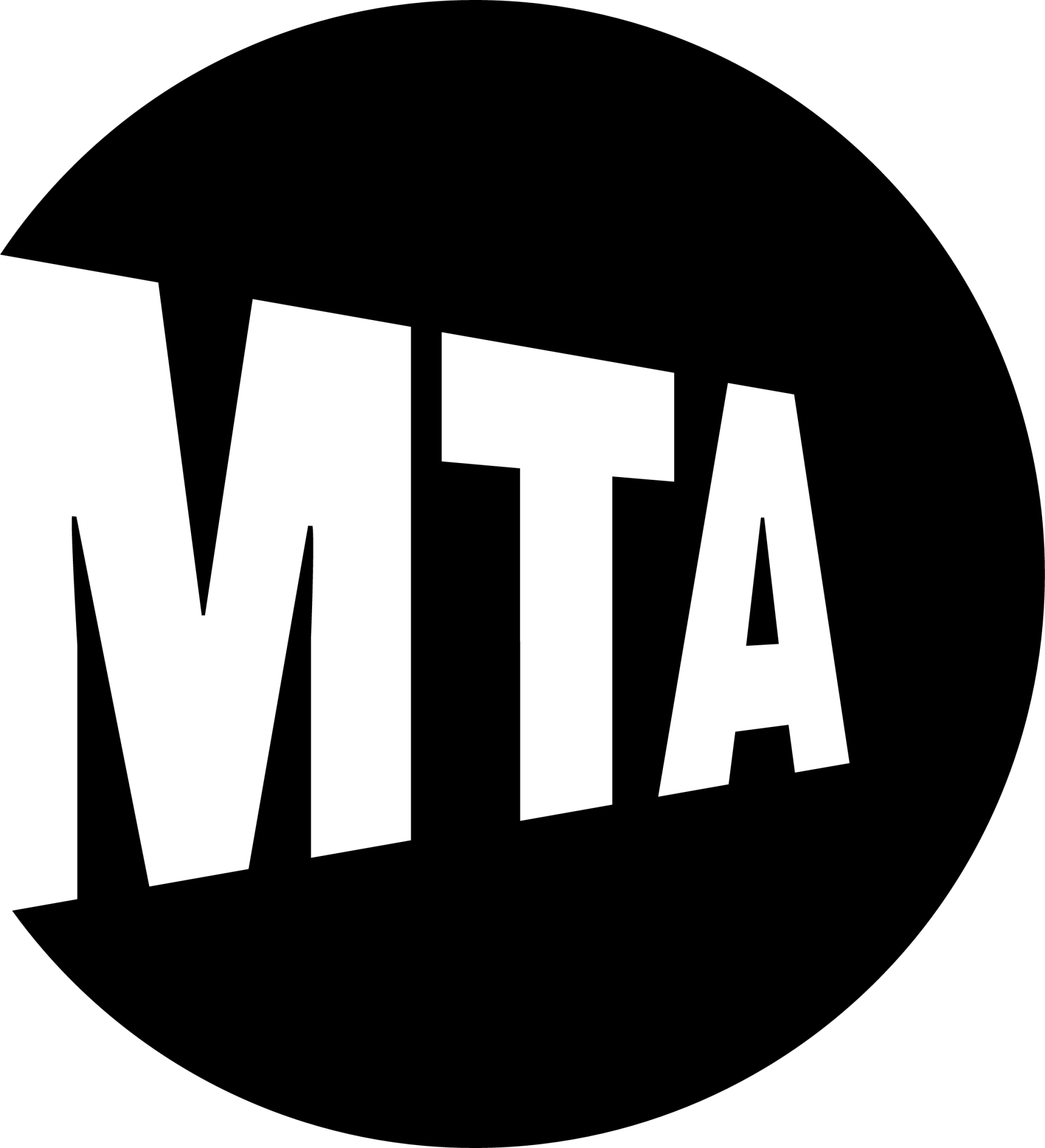
- Original author: Metropolitan Transportation Authority
- Developer: Metropolitan Transportation Authority
- Release: July 2, 2018; 8 years ago
- Preview release: 4.3.0 / April 1, 2026
- Available in: 6 languages
- List of languages English, French, Korean, Russian, Simplified Chinese, Spanish
- Type: Passenger information display system
- Website: new.mta.info

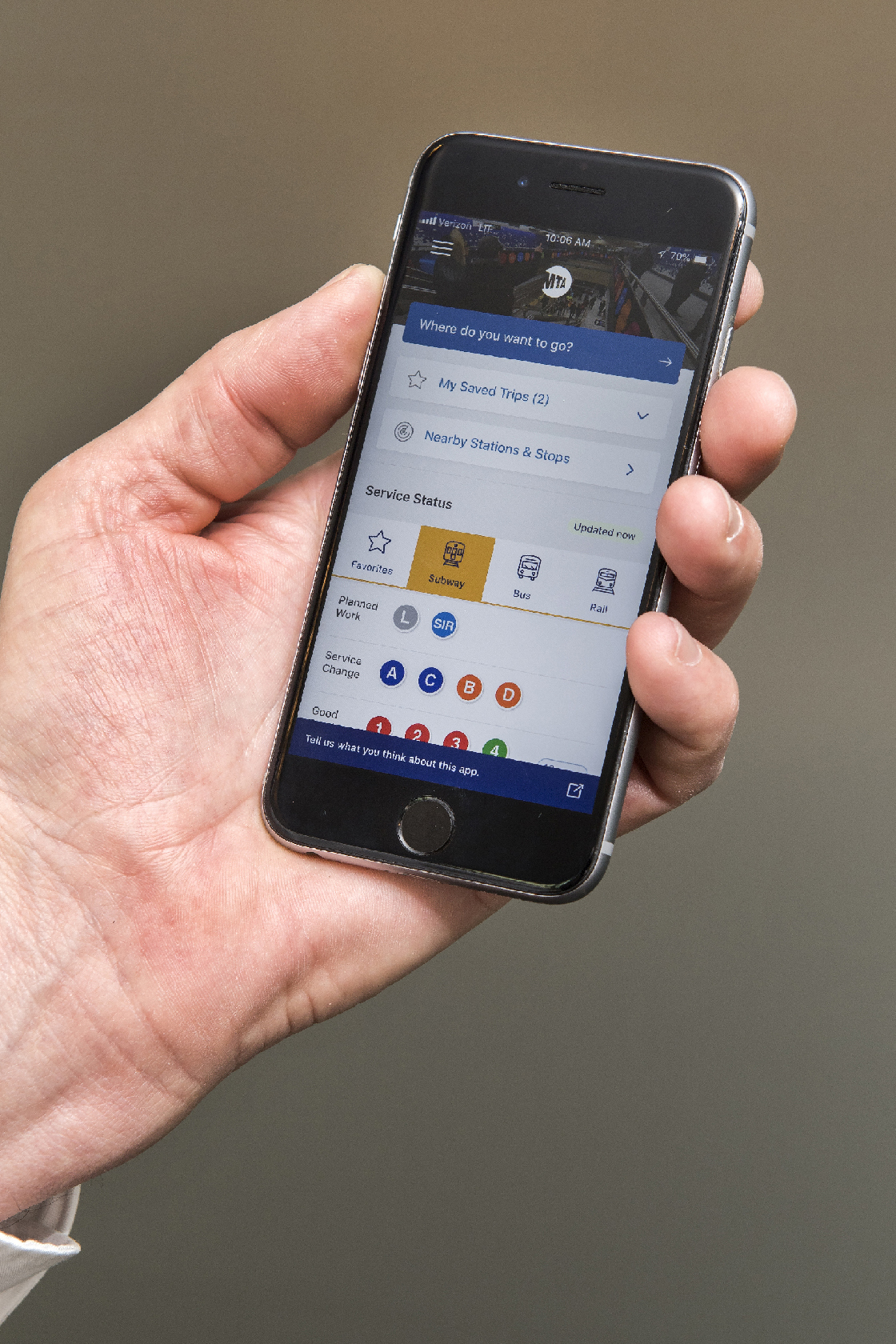
The MYmta user interface at beta launch

MTA is a mobile application-based passenger information display system developed by the Metropolitan Transportation Authority (MTA) of New York City, formerly known as MYmta until 2024. A beta version of the app was launched on July 2, 2018. While other applications exist which serve similar functions, the MTA app is an all-in-one source for data provided directly by the MTA.

== Functionality ==
The MTA App is intended to combine MTA functionalities that are already available in separate apps such as Subway Time, Bus Time, and the Long Island Rail Road (LIRR) and Metro-North Railroad Train Time applications into one all-encompassing application. The app also includes trip planning and paratransit functionalities, and will eventually include fare payment options as well.

=== Live information ===
Similar to the MTA's Subway Time app, MYmta includes live subway arrival times. Furthermore, the app also includes live bus arrival times and map tracking with functionality similar to that found in the MTA Bus Time app.

=== Trip planning ===
Unlike previous iterations of MTA trip planners, the version included within The MTA App also supports modes of transportation not operated by the MTA, such as the Staten Island Ferry, NYC Ferry, PATH, and NJ Transit services. The MTA App can also save users' favorite trips, stations, and stops, so information about them can be accessed quickly.

The app also displays up-to-date information about delays and service changes so users can plan trips accordingly.

=== Paratransit and accessibility ===
The MTA App allows paratransit users to request services through Access-A-Ride, the MTA's paratransit offering. In addition, the app reports statuses and outages of elevators and escalators in accessible stations, extending the functionality also performed by the similarly named My MTA Alerts service into application form.

=== Fare payment ===
As of 2025, the app itself does not support any direct fare payment systems. However, it does link to the MTA TrainTime App where the user can purchase and activate tickets, though the MTA has announced plans to combine eTix functionality into the MTA app.

In the future, the MTA also intends to add bus and subway fare payment options to the application as part of its new OMNY fare payment system.

== History ==
The MTA began testing the MTA App in April 2018 as MYmta, as a replacement for its existing suite of applications.

The beta version of the app was released on July 2, 2018, and it was largely received positively. John Hatchett, an Access-A-Ride user, commented, "I've really felt like we've been listened to about not only what's not working but what we would like to see to make it work better." Transit journalist Jason Rabinowitz commented: "the fact that [the MTA] launched its new app with an outdated subway map is just so deliciously good that I may skip lunch today." However, the New York City Transit chief customer officer Sarah Meyer stated that this was because "updating the map would have jeopardized the launch date" of the app.

In 2023, the MTA began making changes to revamp the MYmta app, by introducing the MTA App, its replacement. The new app has similar functionality as the MYmta app, but with additional features, such as favoriting bus stops and train stations, booking and tracking Access-A-Ride trips, an improved search function, and a visual map allowing the user to check nearby trains and buses to their location. It was initially supposed to be released late-2023 but it was pushed to March 25, 2024, when the new app was officially rolled out to the public.

In late 2025, the MTA announced it was working with Expo to introduce a revamped version of the current MTA App, slated to be released in Q1 2026. This is the same developer who made the TrainTime app. This new revamped version of the app would be released on March 25, 2026 featuring many improvements such as more accurate real-time data but removes arrival information for the Long Island Rail Road and Metro-North Railroad, along with other non-MTA services.
