= Brain Dead =

Brain Dead, brain dead or brain-dead may refer to:

== Medicine ==
- Brain death, the irreversible cessation of all brain activity

== Cinema and television ==
- Brain Dead (1990 film), an American horror thriller
- Braindead (film), a 1992 New Zealand comedy horror film
- Brain Dead (2007 film), a horror film
- BrainDead, an American television series (2016)

== Music ==
- Braindead (album), 2016 album by Lost Society
- "Braindead", a song by The Vines on the album Melodia
- "Braindead", a song by Dune Rats on the album The Kids Will Know It's Bullshit
- "Braindead" (Papa Roach song), 2025
- "Brain Dead", a song by Judas Priest on the album Jugulator
- "Brain Dead", a song by Sharon Needles on the album Battle Axe
- "Brain Dead", a song by Exodus on the album Pleasures of the Flesh
- "Brain Dead", a song by Flotsam and Jetsam on the album Unnatural Selection
- "Brain Dead", a song by Architects featuring House of Protection on the album The Sky, the Earth & All Between

== See also ==
- Brain Dead 13, a video game
