= List of Inspector Gadget (2015 TV series) episodes =

Inspector Gadget is a CGI animated series that debuted in 2015 and is a revival of the original traditionally animated (2-D) 1980's series of the same name. The series is produced and owned by DHX Media.

== Series overview ==
Season	Episodes	Originally released	
Season	Episodes	First released	Last released
1	26	September 7, 2015 (Teletoon); March 27, 2015 (Netflix)	February 15, 2016 (Teletoon); August 29, 2015 (Netflix)
2	26	June 2, 2017	March 16, 2018

== Episodes ==
=== Season 1 (2015–16) ===
No. overall	No. in season	Title	Directed by	Written by	Original release date	Canadian air date	Prod. code
1	1	"Gadget 2.0"	William Gordon; Phillip Stamp	Doug Hadders & Adam Rotstein	March 27, 2015	September 7, 2015	101
Part 1:Inspector Gadget has finally defeated the cruel Dr. Claw and frozen him in an iceberg in the Arctic north. However, his evil nephew Talon thaws him out and infiltrates HQ, posing as an agent in training. Meanwhile, Penny has become an agent in training and now has Brain as her assistant. The Chief then calls her to meet Talon, who is the agency's new recruit and Penny instantly falls in love with him. Part 2:When Penny finds out Claw is back, she decides to put her Uncle Gadget back on the beat to find Claw's claw, because he's going to use it to destroy HQ. When Talon reveals his true intentions after finding out where Claw's claw is, it's now up to Penny to stop MAD, with help from the amazing Inspector Gadget of course.
2a	2a	"Towering Towers"	Pedram	Doug Hadders & Adam Rotstein	March 27, 2015	December 7, 2015	102A
Claw is planning to take control of a large skyscraper and use it to hijack global communication. Penny and the Inspector are sent to stop him and Talon from corrupting the building.
2b	2b	"Game Over, Man" "Game Over, Man, Game Over"	Pedram	Doug Hadders & Adam Rotstein	March 27, 2015	December 7, 2015	102B
Gadget is called to investigate when astronauts go missing from the Multi-National Space Station. Dr. Claw plans to mess up the Grand Canyon.
3a	3a	"Rock Out"	William Gordon	Doug Hadders & Adam Rotstein	March 27, 2015	December 14, 2015	103A
Gadget & Penny are sent to guard international pop star whistler, Nigel Saint De' Le-pepperton IV Esquire III, who is performing in town. Talon has a plan to kidnap him and make the audience his evil army. Talon disguises himself as Nigel and uses a special microphone to mind-control the entire audience.
3b	3b	"Strike a Pose"	William Gordon	David Dias	March 27, 2015	December 21, 2015	103B
Professor Von Slickstein is escorted by Gadget, Penny and Brain to the technology fashion show to protect MAD from stealing his presentation ahead of time.
4a	4a	"A Better Class of MAD"	Pedram	Andrew Harrison	March 27, 2015	December 21, 2015	104A
Tag Shrapnel is kidnapped and force to make a recruitment video to teach MAD agents to become more evil.
4b	4b	"Cough Due to Claw"	William Gordon	Doug Hadders & Adam Rotstein	March 27, 2015	December 21, 2015	104B
When Gadget comes down with the flu Penny must go solo and investigate a series thefts of museum artifacts.
5a	5a	"Dog Show Days Are Over" "Dog Show Days"	Pedram	Emer Connon	March 27, 2015	October 12, 2015	105A
Dr. Claw plans to kidnap all the dogs from a dog show.
5b	5b	"One Bad Apple"	William Gordon	Shawn Kalb	March 27, 2015	October 12, 2015	105B
MAD develops a growth serum for plants and attempts to create an army of mutated apples.
6a	6a	"Sucks Like MAD"	Pedram	Alice Prodanou	March 27, 2015	November 16, 2015	106A
Dr. Claw tries to steal the most powerful vacuum ever.
6b	6b	"A Claw for Talon"	William Gordon	Andrew Harrison	March 27, 2015	November 16, 2015	106B
Talon goes to get Claw's first claw to make himself equally powerful.
7a	7a	"Gadget's Da Bomb"	Pedram	David Dias	March 27, 2015	October 5, 2015	107A
Gadget becomes a walking bomb after eating a chili pepper bomb and Penny must keep him from detonating.
7b	7b	"Gadget Management"	William Gordon	Shawn Kalb	March 27, 2015	October 5, 2015	107B
Penny sneaks into a MAD training seminar, while Gadget ends up in the anger mamangement seminar.
8a	8a	"Diamonds are a MAD's Best Friend"	Pedram	Doug Hadders & Adam Rotstein	March 27, 2015	November 30, 2015	108A
Dr. Claw seeks a city of diamonds so he can power his laser and carve his name into the moon.
8b	8b	"Ticked Off"	William Gordon	Evan Thaler Hickey	March 27, 2015	November 30, 2015	108B
The Cuckoo Clock Maker develops a ray that freezes time and gadget must stop him from freezing everyone at a world leaders summit.
9a	9a	"You Know the Drill"	Phillip Stamp	Shawn Kalb	March 27, 2015	September 28, 2015	109A
In order to warm his ice lair Claw plans to drill into the Earth's crust. Meanwhile Gadget is the center of attention at a town's annual Inspector Gadget Day.
9b	9b	"Operation HQ Reunion"	William Gordon	Emer Connon	March 27, 2015	September 28, 2015	109B
During Gadget's high school reunion, an old partner of his is sent by Claw to freeze the world's top spies. The reason she started working for MAD is because Gadget took credit for all her hard work and she tries to manipulate Penny into joining the dark side, but Penny is totally oblivious to this.
10a	10a	"A Hole in One"	Phillip Stamp	Alice Prodanou	March 27, 2015	September 21, 2015	110A
Using special doughnuts Mama Claw plans to put all of Metro City to sleep.
10b	10b	"Operation Hocus Pocus"	William Gordon	Sean Jara	March 27, 2015	September 21, 2015	110B
The MADgician is broken out of an asylum and plots his revenge against Gadget.
11a	11a	"MAD Carpet Ride"	Phillip Stamp	Andrew Harrison	March 27, 2015	November 2, 2015	111A
MAD tries to steal Sir Owen Barnstormer's Ultra Blimp during an around the world trip.
11b	11b	"Appy Days"	William Gordon	Andrew Harrison	March 27, 2015	November 2, 2015	111B
MAD takes over SuperNerd Studios and plans to use a new app to enslave the entire world.
12a	12a	"Collider Scope"	Phillip Stamp	Evan Thaler Hickey	March 27, 2015	November 9, 2015	112A
Talon and Penny get trapped in a time loop during a mission at the Big Quark Collider.
12b	12b	"She Got Dangerous Game"	William Gordon	Emer Connon	March 27, 2015	November 9, 2015	112B
After Gadget is ordered to go on vacation, MADison Bon Trapp attempts to capture him.
13a	13a	"My Gadget Will Go On"	Phillip Stamp	Shawn Kalb	March 27, 2015	November 23, 2015	113A
After Dr. Claw's new submarine sinks Gadget and Talon race to retrieve it from the bottom of the ocean.
13b	13b	"The Gadgetator"	William Gordon	Craig Martin	March 27, 2015	November 23, 2015	113B
When MAD targets luchador El Pacho Gadget must protect the champion's belt.
14a	14a	"Head Case"	Phillip Stamp	Alice Prodanou	March 27, 2015	December 28, 2015	114A
MAD discovers an artifact related to Easter Island and Gadget must stop them from using its mysterious powers.
14b	14b	"Start Your Gadgets"	William Gordon	Shawn Kalb	March 27, 2015	December 28, 2015	114B
At the La Zoom car race Claw, Talon, Gadget, Penny and MAD agent Jacques Crankcase all compete for first place.
15a	15a	"Mind over MADder"	David Watson	Sean Cullen	March 27, 2015	October 19, 2015	115A
Gadget and Talon race to claim the Helmet of Though from a Himalayan monastery.
15b	15b	"Train-ing Day" "Training Day"	William Gordon	Dave Dias (story) & Evan Thaler Hickey	March 27, 2015	October 19, 2015	115B
MAD plans to steal Sir Owen Barnstormer's new hover train.
16a	16a	"Ice, Ice Yeti"	David Watson	Andrew Harrison	March 27, 2015	January 18, 2016	116A
Talon plans to use an ice melting machine to melt the ice caps and raise the Earth's sea level.
16b	16b	"MAD Soaker"	William Gordon	Andrew Anningson	March 27, 2015	January 18, 2016	116B
Talon tries to steal the water from Loch Ness.
17a	17a	"The Fountain of Cortez"	Derek Jessome	John Saltzman	August 29, 2015	September 14, 2015	117A
The Chief and an archeologist are turned into babies from the fountain of youth.
17b	17b	"Evil U"	William Gordon	Emer Connon	August 29, 2015	September 14, 2015	117B
Penny infiltrates a school for super villains in training where she becomes friends with Mal, one of the students.
18a	18a	"WereBrain of London"	David Watson	Evan Thaler Hickey	August 29, 2015	October 26, 2015	118A
Brain is turned into a monster in London after Talon spills some sort of chemical on him.
18b	18b	"Airhead to the Throne"	William Gordon	Laurie Elliot	August 29, 2015	October 26, 2015	118B
With Claw out of town Talon takes over MAD and begins destroying communication towers.
19a	19a	"Lost in the Lost City of Atlantis"	David Watson	Josh Saltzman	August 29, 2015	January 4, 2016	119A
Penny and Talon both race to find the City Sinker in the lost city of Atlantis.
19b	19b	"A Penny Saved"	William Gordon	Andrew Anningson	August 29, 2015	January 4, 2016	119B
Dr. Claw attempts to steal the world's largest coin (The Giganto) in order to hypnotize the population of New York.
20a	20a	"Double O'Penny"	David Watson	Sean Jara	August 29, 2015	January 11, 2016	120A
After almost getting killed by a missile, Penny finally calls Gadget out for his incompetence and always putting her in danger, but she is driven with guilt. Meanwhile, Talon and Claw create a clone of Penny to destroy Gadget.
20b	20b	"We Heart Gadget"	William Gordon	Evan Thaler Hickey	August 29, 2015	January 11, 2016	120B
Gadget and MAD agent Sue Donym go on a date, each trying to uncover secrets from the other.
21a	21a	"Tiny Talon Time"	David Watson	Laurie Elliot	August 29, 2015	January 11, 2016	121A
Talon shrinks himself in order to steal Gadget's schematics.
21b	21b	"Fellowsheep of the Ring"	William Gordon	Shawn Kalb	August 29, 2015	January 11, 2016	121B
Everyone must go without technology when a tech nullifier is set up in New Zealand.
22a	22a	"A Clawruption" "The Clawruption"	Derek Jessome	Emer Connon	August 29, 2015	January 25, 2016	122A
MAD plans to cause a Hawaiian volcano to erupt to blot put the sun.
22b	22b	"Forever MAD"	William Gordon	Sean Cullen	August 29, 2015	January 25, 2016	122B
MAD sets out to create a Broadway show with the goal of ruining all musicals.
23a	23a	"Beyond Gadgetdome"	David Watson	Shawn Kalb	August 29, 2015	October 26, 2015	123A
MAD sets out to deface as many world landmarks as possible in a competition with Baron Von Steeltoe.
23b	23b	"Brain Drain"	William Gordon	Emer Connon	August 29, 2015	October 26, 2015	123B
In an attempt to steal HQ's passcodes Talon switches MADcat and Brain's minds.
24a	24a	"What Is... the MADtrix"	David Watson	Shawn Kalb	August 29, 2015	February 1, 2016	124A
Penny and Gadget are trapped in HQ's Holoroom with Talon in control.
24b	24b	"Most Extreme Gadget Challenge"	William Gordon	Josh Saltzman	August 29, 2015	February 1, 2016	124B
Gadget enters a Japanese gameshow with MAD Cat as the host.
25a	25a	"Pyramid Scheme"	David Watson	Emer Connon	August 29, 2015	February 1, 2016	125A
MAD tries to sink the pyramids of Giza and Gadget must stop them.
25b	25b	"Back to the MAD Future"	William Gordon	Sean Jara	August 29, 2015	February 8, 2016	125B
Talon is sent back in time to help Dr. Claw become a better villain, but circumstances conspire to create a future where Dr. Claw has turned over a new leaf and risen through the ranks of HQ to become its chief while waging a war on crime against MAD Cat, who he had thought to be dead.
26a	26a	"Tool Russia, With Love"	David Watson	Doug Hadders & Adam Rotstein	August 29, 2015	February 15, 2016	126A
When MAD's latest mission in Siberia threatens to bring about a new ice-age, Gadget and Penny must team up with their Russian counterparts, Comrade Multi-Use-Tool and his niece Pasha.
26b	26b	"Low Speed"	William Gordon	Doug Hadders & Adam Rotstein	August 29, 2015	February 15, 2016	126B
As Gadget drives the HQ bus to an annual retreat Talon plants a booby trap on it.

=== Season 2 (2017–18) ===
No. overall	No. in season	Title	Directed by	Written by	Original release date	Canadian air date	Prod. code
27a	1a	"Jurassic Jerk"	William Gordon & Greg Richardson	Evan Thaler Hickey & Josh Saltzman	June 2, 2017	January 1, 2018	201A
Claw sends Talon to steal a dinosaur egg so he can clone an army of dinosaurs.
27b	1b	"Assistant Chief McFibber"	Geri Bertolo & William Gordon	Josh Saltzman	June 2, 2017	January 1, 2018	201B
Talon disguises himself as Assistant Chief McFibber and infiltrates HQ.
28a	2a	"Drone of Silence"	William Gordon & Greg Richardson	Evan Thaler Hickey	June 11, 2017	January 2, 2018	202A
MAD uses special drones to silence people's voices, starting with opera singers.
28b	2b	"Growing Like MAD"	Geri Bertolo & William Gordon	Mark Purdy	June 12, 2017	January 2, 2018	202B
Talon steals a mutagen that causes plants to grow to enormous size.
29a	3a	"MAD Money"	William Gordon & Greg Richardson	Ben Joseph	June 13, 2017	January 3, 2018	203A
When HQ runs low on funds, Gadget sets out to raise money.
29b	3b	"Baking Bad"	Geri Bertolo & William Gordon	Ashley Lannigan	June 14, 2017	January 3, 2018	203B
Talon disguises himself as a Sweetie Scout in an effort to sneak into HQ and steal an invisibility spray.
30a	4a	"Tempest in a Tea Cup"	William Gordon & Greg Richardson	Sam Ruano	June 27, 2017	January 4, 2018	204A
MAD sets out to stop a peace summit between two nations.
30b	4b	"Mr. Security"	Geri Bertolo & William Gordon	Miles Smith	July 2, 2017	January 4, 2018	204B
Talon tries to steal Professor Von Slickstein's new AI, Mr. Security, but instead causes it to go berserk.
31a	5a	"Cooking with Claw"	William Gordon & Greg Richardson	Franklin Young	July 3, 2017	January 5, 2018	205A
MAD begins kidnapping the world's greatest chefs, so Gadget opens a restaurant to act as bait.
31b	5b	"Catnipped in the Bud"	Geri Bertolo & William Gordon	Jennifer Daley	July 11, 2017	January 5, 2018	205B
When MADcat begins consuming large amounts of catnip, Claw sets out to wipe out all plants, including catnip.
32a	6a	"Cuckoo for Talon"	William Gordon & Greg Richardson	Craig Martin	July 12, 2017	January 8, 2018	206A
MAD steals bells from across the globe so they can build a device to level London.
32b	6b	"Fayre Game"	Geri Bertolo & William Gordon	Nicole Demerse	July 12, 2017	January 8, 2018	206B
When Gadget accidentally uses a time diamond to send himself, Brain, Penny and Talon back to the middle ages, Penny and Talon compete for possession of the gem.
33a	7a	"Picnic Pests"	William Gordon & Greg Richardson	Sam Ruano	July 12, 2017	January 9, 2018	207A
Claw sends a robotic mole to spy on the HQ company picnic.
33b	7b	"Talent Show Off"	Geri Bertolo & William Gordon	Miles Smith	July 12, 2017	January 9, 2018	207B
Claw enters MADcat in the Metro City talent show hoping to win the prize, being mayor for a day.
34a	8a	"Gadget & Oatsfunkle"	William Gordon & Greg Richardson	Franklin Young	July 13, 2017	January 10, 2018	208A
Talon impersonates Gadget's former band partner so they can record a new song for Claw. Meanwhile, Penny goes on her first solo mission.
34b	8b	"Metro City's Sinking"	Geri Bertolo & William Gordon	Jennifer Daley	July 13, 2017	January 10, 2018	208B
Claw demands tunnels be dug under Metro City so that he can avoid gridlock traffic.
35a	9a	"The Lady and the Vamp"	Steve Daye & William Gordon	Craig Martin	July 15, 2017	January 11, 2018	209A
MAD searches for the key to immortality in Dracula's castle in Transylvania.
35b	9b	"The Walking Head Cold"	Geri Bertolo & William Gordon	Jeff Detsky	July 17, 2017	January 11, 2018	209B
MAD infects HQ with a head-cold zombie virus.
36a	10a	"Get Smarts"	Steve Daye & William Gordon	Nicole Demerse	July 17, 2017	January 12, 2018	210A
Claw develops a brain-drainer, which Talon uses to steal other people's intelligence and make himself smarter.
36b	10b	"Escape Room with a View"	Geri Bertolo & William Gordon	Jennifer Daley	July 17, 2017	January 12, 2018	210B
MAD lures Gadget into an escape room, hoping to televise his demise to the world.
37a	11a	"Who Do Voodoo"	Steve Daye & William Gordon	Sam Ruano	July 17, 2017	January 15, 2018	211A
Claw wants a magic crutch that causes bad luck so he can curse all his enemies.
37b	11b	"Midnight MADness"	Geri Bertolo & William Gordon	Kyle Muir	July 17, 2017	January 15, 2018	211B
Claw uses moonlight to create a ray that causes people to experience their worst fears.
38a	12a	"Gadg-ED"	Steve Daye & William Gordon	Jennifer Daley	July 20, 2017	January 16, 2018	212A
When Gadget needs to be recertified, MAD tries to make sure he fails the recertification test.
38b	12b	"See You Later, Super Gator"	Geri Bertolo & William Gordon	Stephanie Kaliner	July 20, 2017	January 16, 2018	212B
Claw develops a helmet that will raise the intelligence of any animal and wants it used to create an alligator army.
39a	13a	"Rain of Terror"	Steve Daye & William Gordon	Kyle Muir	July 20, 2017	January 17, 2018	213A
MAD uses a weather machine to try and conquer the world.
39b	13b	"The Truth Is Under There"	Geri Bertolo & William Gordon	Ian MacIntyre	July 20, 2017	January 17, 2018	213B
MAD sets out to capture a long-crashed alien spacecraft.
40a	14a	"Frienemy of the State"	Steve Daye & William Gordon	Jeff Detsky	May 18, 2018	January 8, 2018	214A
When Talon is caught, Claw replaces him with Penny's friend Mal.
40b	14b	"MADhenge"	Geri Bertolo & William Gordon	Sam Ruano	May 18, 2018	January 9, 2018	214B
When Penny interferes with Talon's attempt to collect cosmic energy from Stonehenge, both Penny and Talon are given cosmic powers.
41a	15a	"The Claw Who Stole Christmas"	Steve Daye & William Gordon	Miles Smith	May 18, 2018	December 15, 2017	215A
Claw sets out to end Christmas by unleashing cheer-destroying nanobots at a tree lighting ceremony.
41b	15b	"The Thingy"	Geri Bertolo & William Gordon	Ian MacIntyre	May 18, 2018	December 15, 2017	215B
Talon is sent to the North Pole to acquire a newly-discovered, unclassified, biological organism.
42a	16a	"The Talon-ted Mr. Colin"	Steve Daye & William Gordon	Stephanie Kaliner	May 18, 2018	January 10, 2018	216A
Talon infiltrates HQ while undercover, hoping to get HQ's missile defense codes from Kayla.
42b	16b	"MADzilla"	Geri Bertolo & William Gordon	William Gordon	May 18, 2018	January 11, 2018	216B
MAD sets out to steal a size modification ray, but accidentally makes MADcat grow to giant size.
43a	17a	"Anti-gravity" "Anti-Gravity"	Steve Daye & William Gordon	Stephen Senders	May 18, 2018	January 12, 2018	217A
MAD attempts to steal a gravity nullifying device.
43b	17b	"Too Many Talons"	Geri Bertolo & William Gordon	Phil Moorhead	May 18, 2018	January 16, 2018	217B
Claw sends Talon to steal a duplicating device, which Talon uses to duplicate himself.
44a	18a	"Star Power"	Steve Daye & William Gordon	Mike McPhaden	May 18, 2018	January 18, 2018	218A
MAD begins stealing the "star power" from celebrities.
44b	18b	"Panda-monium"	Geri Bertolo & William Gordon	Miles Smith	May 18, 2018	January 23, 2018	218B
Talon impersonates a panda to disrupt peace talks between two countries.
45a	19a	"Under the MADnight Sun"	Steve Daye & William Gordon	Stephen Senders	May 18, 2018	January 25, 2018	219A
MAD tries to mine a highly magnetic ore from the forest where Gadget and Penny are camping.
45b	19b	"Skyrates Off the Starboard Bow!" "Skyrates off Starboard Bow!"	Steve Daye & William Gordon	Ian MacIntyre	May 18, 2018	January 30, 2018	219B
MAD sets out to hijack Sir Owen Barnstormer's new Ultra Blimp Mark II and take its cold fusion power source.
46a	20a	"Fate it ‘til You Make it" "Fate It Till You Make It"	Geri Bertolo & William Gordon	Carly Denure	May 18, 2018	February 1, 2018	220A
MAD tries to the Oracle of Delphi so they can use her ability to see the future.
46b	20b	"Once Upon a Screentime"	Geri Bertolo & William Gordon	Mike McPhaden	May 18, 2018	February 6, 2018	220B
MAD sends out a hypnotizing image on every screen in the world.
47a	21a	"The MADstache of Professor Coin"	Steve Daye & William Gordon	Josh Saltzman	May 18, 2018	February 8, 2018	221A
Talon disguises himself as Penny, while making Penny look like a MAD agent.
47b	21b	"MADthuselah"	Geri Bertolo & William Gordon	Evan Thaler Hickey	May 18, 2018	February 13, 2018	221B
Claw develops a device to make people old, making himself younger by comparison. Penny becomes a senior during a fight with Talon.
48a	22a	"The Heir Affhair"	Steve Daye & William Gordon	Stephanie Kaliner	May 18, 2018	February 15, 2018	222A
Talon kidnaps a wealthy old lady and tries to convince her to make him her heir.
48b	22b	"Parched Nemesis"	Geri Bertolo & William Gordon	Andrew Anningson	May 18, 2018	February 20, 2018	222B
MAD steals all the water in Metro City.
49a	23a	"Trees Company"	Steve Daye & William Gordon	Josh Saltzman	May 18, 2018	February 22, 2018	223A
The MAD Weed-whacko has been rehabilitated, but Claw wants him to destroy Central Park in New York.
49b	23b	"MADtrack"	Geri Bertolo & William Gordon	Evan Thaler Hickey	May 18, 2018	February 27, 2018	223B
Gadget is assigned to transport Jacques Crankcase to prison, via a hover-train.
50a	24a	"The Missionball Ball"	Steve Daye & William Gordon	Joel Buxton	May 18, 2018	March 1, 2018	224A
MAD infiltrates HQ's Missionball Ball with a weapon that forces people to dance.
50b	24b	"Tell Me What Sphinx"	Geri Bertolo & William Gordon	Burke Scurfield	May 18, 2018	March 6, 2018	224B
MAD attempts to find a superweapon in the Great Sphinx of Giza.
51a	25a	"Harmageddon"	Steve Daye & William Gordon	Josh Saltzman	May 18, 2018	March 8, 2018	225A
MAD tries to redirect a comet so that it crashes into Metro City.
51b	25b	"Do No Arm"	Geri Bertolo & William Gordon	Evan Thaler Hickey	May 18, 2018	March 12, 2018	225B
Penny breaks her arm and is sent to a hospital, where a MAD plot is afoot.
52a	26a	"Inspector Gadget Goes to Jail"	Steve Daye & William Gordon	Josh Saltzman	May 18, 2018	March 14, 2018	226A
When Talon frames Gadget for shoplifting and gets him thrown in prison, Penny must break the rules to get him out.
52b	26b	"We Had a Really Good Title for This One... But We Forgot It"	Geri Bertolo & William Gordon	Evan Thaler Hickey	May 18, 2018	March 16, 2018	226B
MAD uses a memory eraser device to try and defeat Gadget.
