= TeachersCount =

U.S. 501(c)(3) non-profit organization

TeachersCount is a U.S. non-profit organization, classified as 501(c)(3), founded in 2001 by Diana Burroughs, who served as executive director, and Dini von Mueffling, who joined as a board member. Its mission is to promote the teaching professions and to provide resources to teachers. The offices of TeachersCount are in New York City.

== Main programs ==
- "'Behind Every Famous Person Is a Fabulous Teacher" Campaign

The campaign consists of full-page print public service announcements in major mass-market magazines. Each features a celebrity and his or her favorite teacher. The campaign is supported by Time Inc., which has donated ad space, and Jones New York In The Classroom, which covers ad production costs.

- Super Hero Teacher of the Year Contest The contest invited middle school students to nominate their favorite teachers by writing essays called, "Why My Teacher Is a Super Hero". The winning teachers and the students who nominated them appeared in a special-edition Marvel comic book that featured teachers as Super Heroes.
- Teacher appreciation

TeachersCount has had a partnership with Hallmark Cards since 2005 that involves providing teacher appreciation e-cards and teacher appreciation ideas online.
