= List of bus routes in Manhattan =

Bus routes in New York City

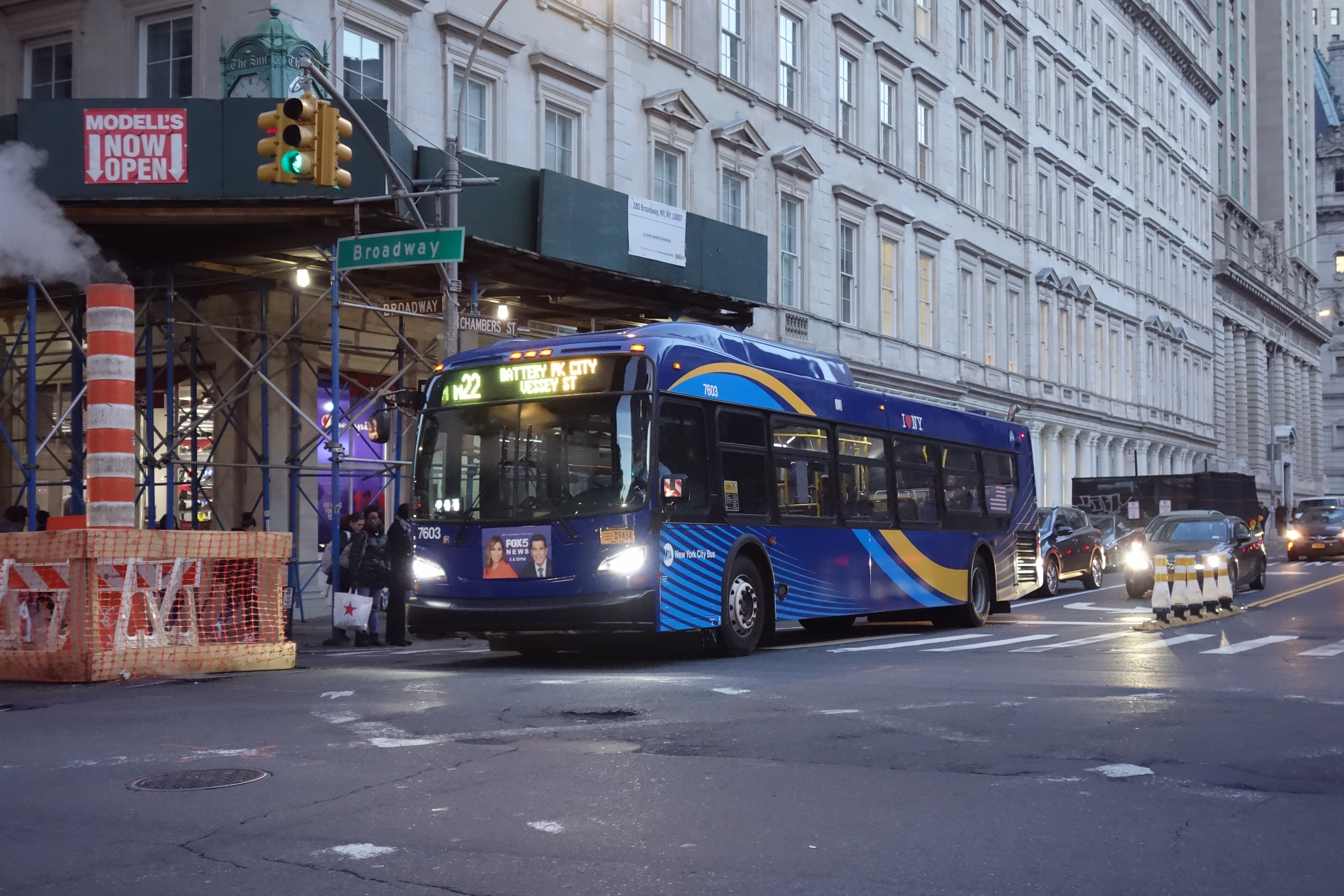
A 2019 New Flyer XD40 (7603) on the Battery Park City-bound M22 at Broadway/Chambers Street in November 2019

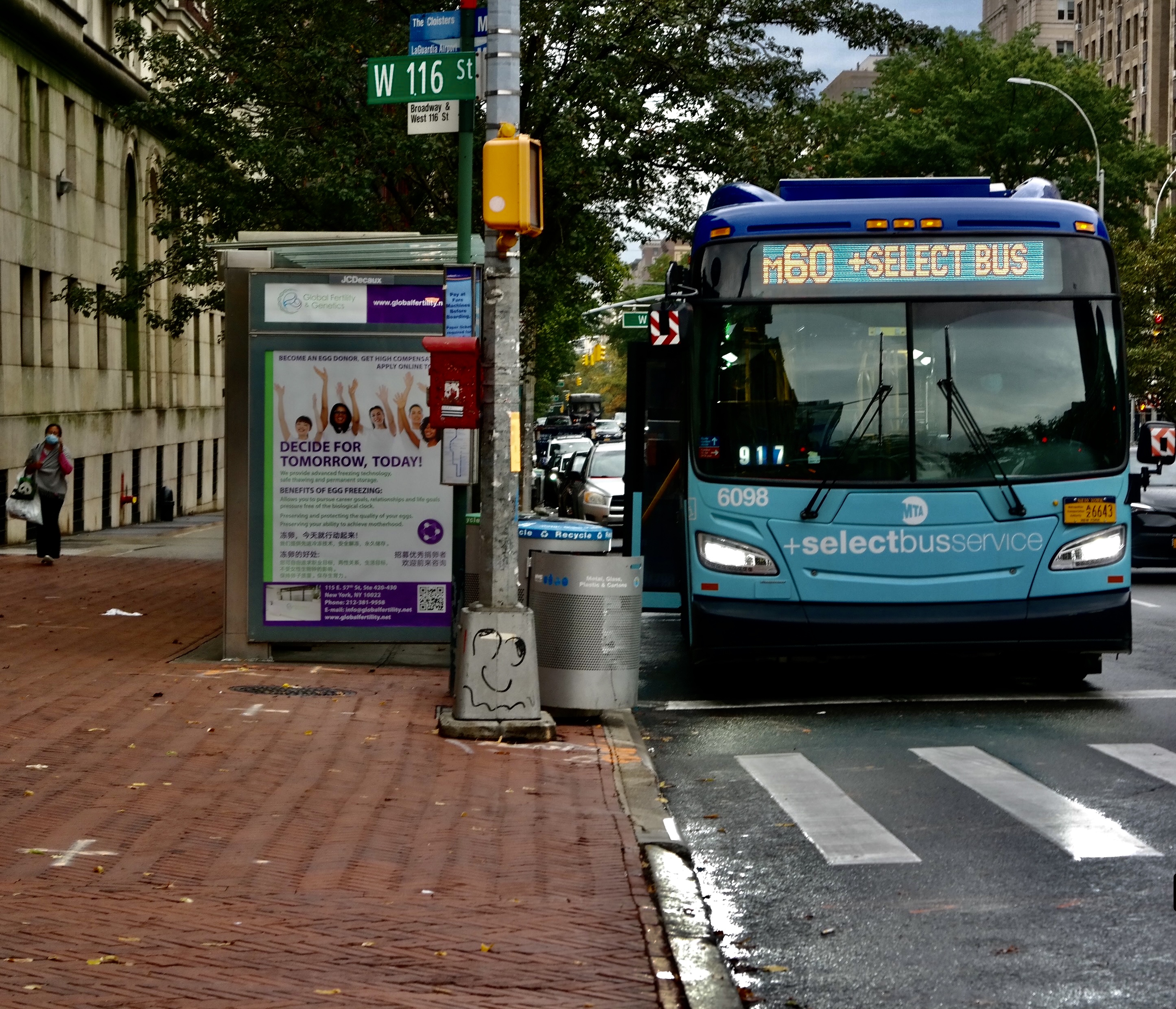
A 2017 New Flyer XD60 (6098) on the LaGuardia-bound M60 SBS at Broadway/West 116th Street

Several companies, most prominently the Metropolitan Transportation Authority (MTA), operate a number of bus routes in Manhattan, New York, United States. Many of them are the direct descendants of streetcar lines (see list of streetcar lines in Manhattan).

== Companies ==
Presently, the New York City Transit Authority and its subsidiary Manhattan and Bronx Surface Transit Operating Authority operate most local buses in Manhattan. The Roosevelt Island Operating Corporation operates the Roosevelt Island Red Bus Service.

The first bus company in Manhattan was the Fifth Avenue Coach Company, which began operating the Fifth Avenue Line (now the M1 route) in 1886. When New York Railways began abandoning several streetcar lines in 1919, the replacement bus routes (including the current M21 and M22 routes) were picked up by the New York City Department of Plant and Structures (DP&S). The DP&S began operating several other buses (including the current M79 and M96 routes) in 1921. All of these but the M21 were acquired by Green Bus Lines in 1933; Green transferred several of these to the Comprehensive Omnibus Corporation in 1935.

The New York City Omnibus Corporation began operating replacement routes for New York Railways lines abandoned in 1936, and acquired the remaining Green routes. They also acquired the Madison Avenue Coach Company (former New York and Harlem Railroad lines), Eighth Avenue Coach Corporation (former Eighth and Ninth Avenue Railways lines), and in 1942 the Triangle Bus Corporation (current M21 route).

In 1936, the NYCO and Fifth Avenue were placed under common ownership. The two were merged directly by 1956, when the NYCO acquired the Surface Transportation Corporation (which had operated former Third Avenue Railway routes since 1941), and changed its name to Fifth Avenue Coach Lines. After a strike, the entire Fifth Avenue system was transferred to the newly formed Manhattan and Bronx Surface Transit Operating Authority on March 22, 1962.

In 1933, two related companies began to operate routes: the Comprehensive Omnibus Corporation gained several Green Bus Lines routes (including the current M22, M27, and M50 routes), and the East Side Omnibus Corporation started operating former Second Avenue Railroad routes (including the current M15 and M31 routes). The Comprehensive also started the current M66 route that year, and in 1948 the New York City Board of Transportation acquired the Comprehensive and East Side routes, transferred to the New York City Transit Authority in 1953. The M9 route came from the Avenue B and East Broadway Transit Company in 1980, which had begun operating replacement routes for the Dry Dock, East Broadway and Battery Railroad lines in 1932.

== Routes ==
This table gives details for the routes prefixed with "M"—in other words, those considered to run primarily in Manhattan by the MTA. For details on routes with other prefixes, see the following articles:

- List of bus routes in the Bronx: Bx3, Bx6, Bx6 SBS, Bx7, Bx9, Bx11, Bx12, Bx12 SBS, Bx13, Bx19, Bx20, Bx33, Bx35, Bx36, Bx92, T102
- List of bus routes in Brooklyn: B39, B106, T432
- List of bus routes in Queens: Q32, Q60, Q102
- List of express bus routes in New York City: all routes
- List of bus routes in Westchester County: BxM4C
- List of bus routes in New Jersey: 100-199

Connections to New York City Subway stations at the bus routes' terminals are also listed where applicable.

=== New York City Bus ===
Most bus routes do not operate overnight, usually defined as midnight to 5:00 AM. Routes that do provide overnight service are noted below with an asterisk (*).

The Manhattan bus routes should not be confused with Megabus routes originating from Manhattan. Like the Manhattan bus routes, Megabus route designations consist of the letter "M" followed by a number.

All routes in operate local service; additional limited-stop or Select Bus Service routes are noted below.

==== M1 to M23 ====
Route	Terminals			Primary streets traveled	Service notes
M1	Local Service				
M1	Limited-Stop Service (Weekday Rush Hours; Peak Direction)				
M1	Harlem; West 147th Street and Powell Boulevard	↔	SoHo; Centre Street and Grand Street	All trips: Fifth Avenue/Madison Avenue SoHo trips: Broadway/Lafayette Street	Limited-Stop Service operates AM hours to SoHo and PM hours to Harlem only.; Weekday trips operate to either SoHo or East Village terminals.; All Weekend trips operate to SoHo.; Some trips originating in Harlem may terminate at Fifth Avenue and 42nd Street.
M1	Harlem; West 147th Street and Powell Boulevard	↔	East Village; East 8th Street and Fourth Avenue at Astor Place ( train)	All trips: Fifth Avenue/Madison Avenue SoHo trips: Broadway/Lafayette Street	Limited-Stop Service operates AM hours to SoHo and PM hours to Harlem only.; Weekday trips operate to either SoHo or East Village terminals.; All Weekend trips operate to SoHo.; Some trips originating in Harlem may terminate at Fifth Avenue and 42nd Street.
M2*	Local Service (Evenings, Late Nights, and Early Weekend Mornings)				
M2*	Limited-Stop Service				
M2*	Washington Heights; West 168th Street and Broadway at 168th Street ( trains)	↔	East Village; East 8th Street and Fourth Avenue at Astor Place ( train)	Central Park North, Powell Boulevard, Fifth Avenue/Madison Avenue	Limited-Stop Service operates all times except early morning and overnight hours.; Local service only operates during overnight and early morning hours.; Some Washington Heights-bound buses may terminate at 7th Avenue and 145th Street.; Limited AM trips originate at Central Park North-5th Avenue towards Washington Heights.
M3	Fort George; West 193rd Street and St. Nicholas Avenue	↔	East Village; East 8th Street and Fourth Avenue at Astor Place ( train)	Central Park North, St. Nicholas Avenue, Fifth Avenue/Fourth and Madison Avenues	After 10:30 PM, Fort George service terminates at 125th Street and St. Nicholas Avenue.; Limited AM trips towards Fort George originate at Central Park North-5th Avenue.
M4	Local Service				
M4	Limited-Stop Service (Weekday Rush Hours; Peak Direction)				
M4	The Cloisters Museum; Cabrini Boulevard and Fort Washington Avenue at 190th Street ( train)	↔	Midtown; East 32nd Street and Fifth Avenue	Central Park North, Broadway, Fort Washington Avenue, Fifth Avenue/Madison Avenue	Limited-Stop Service operates AM hours to Midtown-32nd Street, PM hours to Cabrini Boulevard.; When the Cloisters Museum is open, Cloisters-bound buses enter Fort Tryon Park and make one stop near the museum before looping around back to Fort Washington Av, terminating at Cabrini Boulevard.; When the Cloisters Museum is closed, buses terminate at the entrance to Fort Tryon Park at Cabrini Boulevard.; Some Cloisters-bound buses may terminate at Broadway and 135th Street.; The majority of AM local trips originate at Broadway-135th Street towards Cabrini Boulevard.; Limited AM local trips originate at Central Park North-5th Avenue towards Cabrini Boulevard.
M5	Local Service (Weekday Early Mornings/Evenings and Weekends)				
M5	Limited-Stop Service (Weekdays)				
M5	Washington Heights; West 178th Street and Broadway	↔	Greeley Square; West 31st Street and Sixth Avenue	Broadway, Riverside Drive, Central Park South, Fifth Avenue/Sixth Avenue	Limited-Stop Service operates during weekdays.; Local service only operates during weekday early mornings/evenings and weekends.
M7*	Harlem; West 147th Street and Powell Boulevard	↔	Chelsea; 14th Street and Sixth Avenue at 14th Street/Sixth Avenue ( trains)	Lenox Avenue, Manhattan Avenue, Columbus Avenue/Amsterdam Avenue, Seventh Avenue/Sixth Avenue	
M8	West Village; West Street and Christopher Street	↔	East Village; Avenue D and East 10th Street	West 10th Street/Christopher Street, East 8th Street and St. Marks Place/East 9th Street, East 10th Street	
M9	Battery Park City; South End Avenue and Liberty Street	↔	Kips Bay; East 29th Street and First Avenue at Bellevue Hospital	East Broadway, Essex Street, Avenue C	
M10	Harlem; Douglass Boulevard and West 159th Street	↔	Columbus Circle; Broadway and West 57th Street	Frederick Douglass Boulevard, Central Park West	
M11	West Village; Bethune Street and Hudson Street at Abingdon Square	↔	Riverbank State Park	Amsterdam Avenue (Tenth Avenue), Columbus Avenue (Ninth Avenue)	Operates to Riverbank State Park except late evenings.
M11	West Village; Bethune Street and Hudson Street at Abingdon Square	↔	Harlem; West 133rd Street and Broadway	Amsterdam Avenue (Tenth Avenue), Columbus Avenue (Ninth Avenue)	Operates to Riverbank State Park except late evenings.
M12	West Village; Eighth Avenue and Jane Street at Abingdon Square	↔	Columbus Circle; Broadway and West 58th Street	West 14th Street/West 18th Street, Twelfth Avenue/Eleventh Avenue	Some Columbus Circle-bound buses may terminate at 57th Street and 11th Avenue.
M14A*	Select Bus Service				
M14A*	West Village; Hudson Street and West 12th Street at Abingdon Square	↔	Lower East Side; Grand Street and FDR Drive	14th Street, Avenue A	
M14D*	Select Bus Service				
M14D*	Chelsea Piers; West 18th Street and Tenth Avenue	↔	Lower East Side; Delancey Street and Columbia Street	14th Street, Avenue D	
M15*	Local Service				
M15*	Select Bus Service (All Day)				
M15*	East Harlem; East 126th Street and Second Avenue	↔	South Ferry; Whitehall Street and South Street at South Ferry/Whitehall Street ( trains)	Second Avenue/First Avenue, Allen Street, Water Street	Select Bus Service trips terminate at the South Ferry bus loop at the Staten Island Ferry Terminal.; Local service operates to either South Ferry or Pike Street terminals days and evenings.; During AM rush hours, many M15 Select Bus Service trips will terminate/originate at Houston Street.; Overnight service is provided by local buses only, serving Whitehall Street-South Ferry, these local buses do not serve the South Ferry Bus Loop.
M15*	East Harlem; East 126th Street and Second Avenue	↔	Lower East Side; South Street and Pike Street	Second Avenue/First Avenue, Allen Street, Water Street	Select Bus Service trips terminate at the South Ferry bus loop at the Staten Island Ferry Terminal.; Local service operates to either South Ferry or Pike Street terminals days and evenings.; During AM rush hours, many M15 Select Bus Service trips will terminate/originate at Houston Street.; Overnight service is provided by local buses only, serving Whitehall Street-South Ferry, these local buses do not serve the South Ferry Bus Loop.
M20	South Ferry; Whitehall Street and South Street at South Ferry/Whitehall Street ( trains)	↔	Lincoln Center; West 66th Street and Broadway	South End Avenue, North End Avenue, Hudson Street/Varick Street, Eighth Avenue, Seventh Avenue	
M21	West Village; Washington Street and Spring Street	↔	Lower East Side; Grand Street and FDR Drive	Houston Street	Afternoon rush hour trips short-turn at Varick Street.
M22	Battery Park City; North End Avenue and Vesey Street	↔	Lower East Side; Grand Street and FDR Drive	Chambers Street, Park Row/Worth Street, Frankfort Street/East Broadway, Madison Street	
M23*	Select Bus Service				
M23*	Chelsea Piers; Twelfth Avenue near West 23rd Street	↔	Peter Cooper Village—Stuyvesant Town; Avenue C and East 20th Street	23rd Street	

==== M31 to M79 ====
Route	Terminals			Primary streets traveled	Service notes
M31	Clinton; West 54th Street and Eleventh Avenue	↔	Yorkville; East 92nd Street and York Avenue	57th Street, York Avenue	
M34	Select Bus Service (All Day)				
M34	Chelsea; Twelfth Avenue and West 34th Street	↔	East Side Ferry Terminal; FDR Drive and East 34th Street	34th Street	Alternate trips to/from Waterside Plaza.
M34	Chelsea; Twelfth Avenue and West 34th Street	↔	Waterside Plaza	34th Street	Alternate trips to/from Waterside Plaza.
M34A	Select Bus Service (All Day)				
M34A	Port Authority Bus Terminal; West 42nd Street and Ninth Avenue	↔	Waterside Plaza	Eighth/Ninth Avenues, 34th Street	
M35	Harlem; East 125th Street and Lexington Avenue at 125th Street ( trains)	↔	Randall's Island and Wards Island	East 124th/126th Streets, Central Road, Hell Gate Circle	Travels between Harlem and Randall’s/Wards Islands via the RFK Bridge.
M42*	United Nations; First Avenue and East 42nd Street	↔	Circle Line Sightseeing Cruises; Twelfth Avenue at Pier 83	42nd Street	Some Pier 83-bound buses may terminate at Eighth Avenue and U.N.-bound buses at Grand Central Terminal.
M50	East Midtown; East 49th Street and First Avenue	↔	Circle Line Sightseeing Cruises; Twelfth Avenue at Pier 83	49th/50th Streets	
M55	Midtown; West 44th Street and Sixth Avenue	↔	South Ferry; Whitehall Street and South Street at South Ferry/Whitehall Street ( trains)	Fifth/Sixth Avenues, Broadway/Church Street	Some South Ferry-bound buses may terminate at Chambers Street and Broadway.
M57	Upper West Side; West 72nd Street and Broadway at 72nd Street ( trains)	↔	East Midtown; First Avenue and East 55th Street	West End Avenue, 57th Street	
M60*	Select Bus Service				
M60*	Morningside Heights; West 106th Street and Broadway	↔	LaGuardia Airport, Queens; All terminals	Broadway, 125th Street, Astoria Boulevard	Some Airport-bound buses may terminate at East 125th Street and Lexington Avenue.; Travels between Manhattan and Queens via the Robert F. Kennedy Bridge.
M66	Upper West Side; West 66th Street and West End Avenue	↔	Upper East Side; York Avenue and East 67th Street	West 65th/66th Streets, East 68th/67th Streets	
M72	Upper West Side; Freedom Place and West 66th Street	↔	Upper East Side; York Avenue and East 72nd Street	West 72nd Street, 65th Street/Transverse, East 72nd Street	
M79*	Select Bus Service				
M79*	Upper West Side; Riverside Drive and West 79th Street	↔	Upper East Side; East End Avenue and East 79th Street	79th Street	

==== M86 to M125 ====
Route	Terminals			Primary streets traveled	Service notes
M86*	Select Bus Service				
M86*	Upper West Side; West 86th Street and Broadway	↔	Yorkville; East 92nd Street and York Avenue	86th Street	
M96*	Upper West Side; West End Avenue and West 96th Street	↔	Yorkville; First Avenue and East 97th Street	96th Street	
M98	Limited-Stop Service (Weekday Rush Hours)				
M98	Washington Heights; West 193rd Street and Fort Washington Avenue at 190th Street ( train)	↔	Upper East Side; East 68th Street and Lexington Avenue at Hunter College	Fort Washington Avenue, Harlem River Drive, Lexington Avenue/Third Avenue	Weekday rush hour service only.
M100	Inwood; West 220th Street and Broadway	↔	Harlem; St. Nicholas Avenue and West 125th Street	Tenth Avenue, Broadway, Amsterdam Avenue	
M101*	Local Service (Evenings, Late Nights, and Early Mornings)				
M101*	Limited-Stop Service				
M101*	Fort George; West 193rd Street and Saint Nicholas Avenue	↔	East Village; Cooper Square; East 6th Street and Third Avenue at Astor Place ( trains)	Amsterdam Avenue, 125th Street, Lexington Avenue/Third Avenue	Limited-Stop Service runs daily except overnight hours, when local service operates.; Select early morning, rush hour, and late evening trips will originate/terminate at 96th Street in both directions.; Many early AM East Village local trips originate in front of the Tuskegee Airmen Bus Depot at 100th Street.
M102*	Harlem; West 147th Street and Adam Clayton Powell Boulevard	↔	East Village; Cooper Square; East 6th Street and Third Avenue at Astor Place ( trains)	Lenox Avenue, 116th Street, Lexington Avenue/Third Avenue	Some weekday select trips operate between 147th and 96th Streets: to 147th Street in the AM, to 96th Street in the PM.
M103*	City Hall; Park Row and Broadway	↔	East Harlem; East 125th Street and Lexington Avenue	Bowery, Third Avenue/Lexington Avenue	
M104*	Harlem; West 129th Street and Amsterdam Avenue	↔	Times Square; 41st Street and 8th Avenue at Times Square–42nd Street ( trains) and 42nd Street–Port Authority Bus Terminal ( trains)	Broadway, Seventh Avenue/Eighth Avenue	
M106	East Harlem; East 106th Street and FDR Drive	↔	Upper West Side; West 96th Street and West End Avenue	East 106th Street, West 96th Street	
M116	East Harlem; East 120th Street and Pleasant Avenue	↔	Morningside Heights; West 106th Street and Broadway	116th Street, Manhattan Avenue, West 106th Street	Fare-free service for six to 12 months started on September 24, 2023, and ended August 31, 2024.
M125*	Harlem; West 125th Street and 12th Avenue	↔	The Hub, Bronx; 149th Street and Third Avenue at Third Avenue–149th Street station ( trains)	125th Street, Willis Avenue (Bronx)	Travels between Manhattan and the Bronx via the Willis Avenue Bridge toward the Bronx and the Third Avenue Bridge toward Harlem.

==== Subway shuttle routes ====
The following table lists the scheduled NYC Bus routes that temporarily replace portions of service on the New York City Subway due to system maintenance.

Route	NYCS Service	Terminals			Primary streets traveled
L92	train	8th Avenue-14th Street ( trains)	↔	Delancey Street-Essex Street ( trains)	14th Street, Avenue A
T204	train	Washington Heights-168th Street ( trains)	↔	137th Street-City College ( train)	Broadway
T220	train	Washington Heights-168th Street ( trains)	↔	190th Street ( train)	Fort Washington Avenue; Additional stops are made at the G.W. Bridge, 185th Street and 190th Street.
T221	train	Washington Heights-168th Street ( trains)	↔	Inwood-207th Street ( train)	Broadway; Additional stops are made at the G.W. Bridge, 185th Street and 190th Street.
T232	train	West Fourth Street ( trains)	↔	Grand Street ( train)	Houston Street
T260	train	Times Square–42nd Street ( trains)	↔	34th Street–Hudson Yards ( train)	42nd Street/44th Street, 11th Avenue/10th Avenue

=== New York Waterway ===
New York Waterway operates shuttle bus routes to/from its West Midtown Ferry Terminal, located at 38th Street and Twelfth Avenue. Service is free.

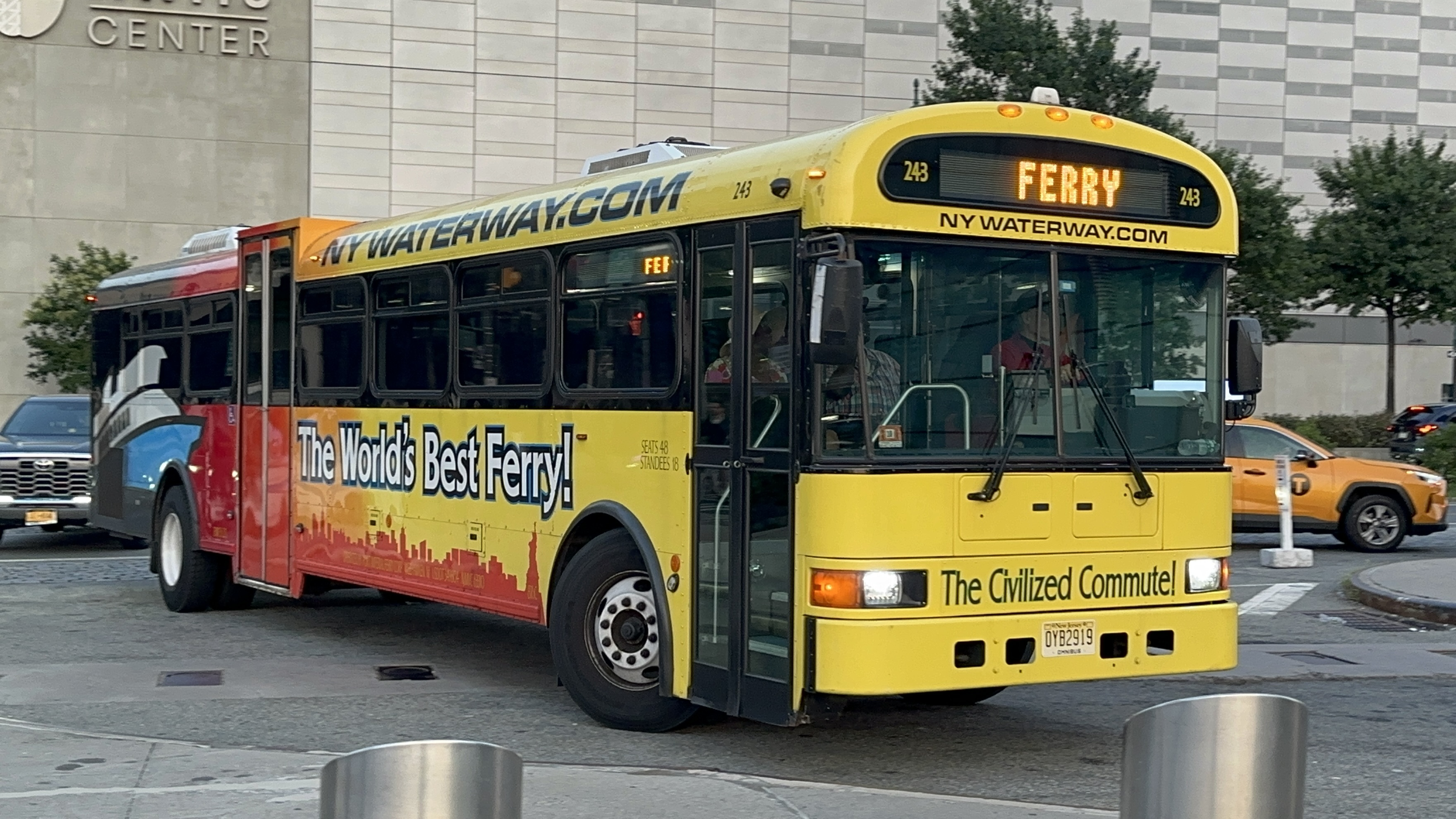
NY Waterway 243 pulling in to the Manhattan terminal.

Peak service

Terminal	Streets traveled
Midtown; Third Avenue and 57th Street	57th Street
Midtown; Lexington Avenue and 50th Street	50th Street (eastbound), 49th Street (westbound)
Midtown; Third Avenue and 42nd Street	42nd Street
Murray Hill; Third Avenue and 34th Street	34th Street
Downtown Loop	AM: 23rd Street, Broadway, Houston Street, West Street (clockwise); PM: West Street, Clarkson Street, Sixth Avenue, 23rd Street (counterclockwise)

Off-peak service

All routes operate as clockwise loops.

Streets traveled	Notes
50th Street, Tenth Avenue, 65th Street, Broadway, 42nd Street	No Sunday service
44th Street, Eighth Avenue, 57th Street, Fifth Avenue, 49th Street	
50th Street, Sixth Avenue, 57th Street, Eighth Avenue, 49th Street	Weekday midday service only
42nd Street, Fifth Avenue, 34th Street	
23rd Street, Varick Street, West Broadway, Murray Street, West Street	

=== Downtown Connection ===
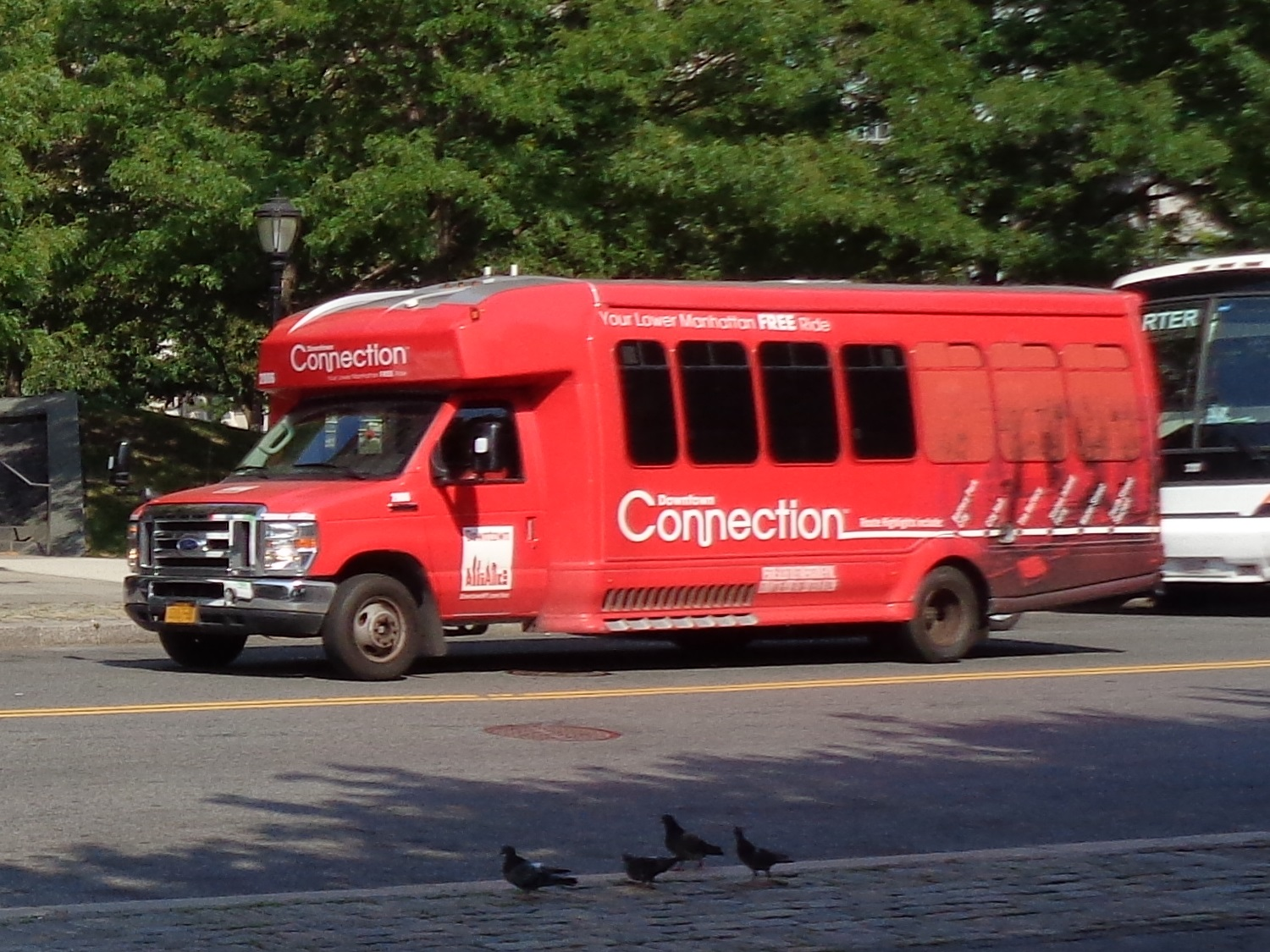
A Downtown Connection bus in Battery Park City.

In Lower Manhattan a free shuttle, sponsored by the Lower Manhattan Business Improvement District (BID), operates minibuses daily from 10:00 AM until 7:30 PM.

Route	Terminals			Primary streets traveled
Downtown; Connection	Battery Park City; Warren Street and North End Avenue	↔	South Street Seaport; Water Street and Fulton Street	Warren/Murray Streets, South End Avenue, Battery Place, State Street Water Street

== History of the current Manhattan bus routes ==
=== Routes M1 to M23 ===
Route	History
M1	Fifth Avenue Coach Company began operating its Fifth Avenue Line bus in 1886; Madison Avenue Coach Company bus replaced New York and Harlem Railroad's Fourth and Madison Avenues Line streetcar on February 1, 1935.; In Fiscal Year 1963, the route was modified in Midtown to improve traffic.; The two routes were combined as a one-way pair on January 14, 1966.; Due to a budget crisis, overnight service, weekend service south of 106th Street, and weekday South Ferry service were discontinued and service was rerouted to match the M2 on June 27, 2010.; Weekend service south of 106th Street was restored on January 6, 2013.; Service was extended back down to Grand Street from 8th Street on September 3, 2017; service will eventually be re-extended to Worth Street.
M2	Fifth Avenue Coach Company began operating this bus route on February 23, 1901.; Northbound buses were moved to Madison Avenue on January 14, 1966, and the route was renumbered to the 2A.; Renumbered from 2A to M2 on July 1, 1974.; Limited-stop service began on October 14, 1991, replacing local service between 7 a.m. and 7 p.m.; On June 30, 2024, the M2 stop on Audubon Avenue at West 165th St was discontinued and moved to Amsterdam Avenue.
M3	Fifth Avenue Coach Company began operating this bus route on February 23, 1901.; Northbound buses were moved to Madison Avenue on January 14, 1966.; Northbound service were rerouted away from University Place and 9th Street on June 27, 2010, due to a budget crisis.; Service was rerouted from St. Nicholas Avenue between 155th Street and 163rd Street in September 2010.; On June 30, 2024 the M3 stop terminal was relocated on St. Nicholas Avenue at West 192nd Street.
M4	Fifth Avenue Coach Company began operating this bus route on August 5, 1900.; Northbound buses were moved to Madison Avenue on January 14, 1966.; In 1983, service was rerouted via Broadway between West 110th Street and West 135th Street due to the reconstruction of the Riverside Drive viaduct. The viaduct reopened in 1987. In October 1987, the MTA board voted to make the change permanent at the next available pick. It was made permanent because the land-use along Broadway was more conducive to transit use than the land-use along Riverside Drive. The route along Broadway was slower, but was shorter by two blocks.; Southbound buses were rerouted via West 37th Street instead of via West 34th Street between Fifth Avenue and Seventh Avenue due to new turning restrictions on November 1, 2015.; On July 4, 2018, the M4's terminal was moved from Penn Station to East 32nd Street and Fifth Avenue to accommodate sidewalk widening on 32nd Street.; On June 30, 2024, the northbound M4 stop on East 32nd Street at 5th Avenue will be relocated to Madison Avenue at East 32nd Street. The stop on East 32nd Street at 5th Avenue will be drop-off only.
M5	Fifth Avenue Coach Company began operating this bus route on August 5, 1900.; Northbound buses were moved to Sixth Avenue between Houston Street and 57th Street on January 14, 1966.; In 1983, service was rerouted via Broadway between West 120th Street and West 135th Street due to the reconstruction of the Riverside Drive viaduct. The viaduct reopened in 1987. In October 1987, the MTA board voted to restore its old route via Riverside Drive. The restoration of service via this route reduced end-to-end travel time on the route. In addition, peak-hour service running via Riverside Drive between West 135th Street and West 157th Street was rerouted via Broadway. Four southbound trips had used this route during the a.m. rush hour and three northbound trips had used it during the p.m. rush hour. Only an average of 12 passengers boarded along this portion of the route because service along this section was infrequent and unreliable. These changes were made at the next available pick.; On September 10, 1989, buses were rerouted from 57th Street to 59th Street to reduce travel time.; In September 1996, three changes were made to M5 service. All service began making limited stops on weekdays between 6:30 a.m. and 6:30 p.m. southbound and between 7 a.m. and 7 p.m. northbound. This change reduced running time by 15 minutes, significantly reducing operating costs, and was expected to boost ridership and reduce overcrowding at the 72nd Street subway station. In addition, M5 service was rerouted off Riverside Drive and onto Broadway between West 135th Street and West 120th Street. Along this stretch there were only three bus stops as the Riverside Drive Viaduct is elevated above street level. Rerouting the M5 was intended to improve passengers heading to and from this section of Broadway. The reroute was expected to slow service by four minutes as Broadway was more congested than Riverside Drive. Finally, the span of northbound service was increased in the morning, with the first bus leaving Houston Street at 6 a.m. instead of at 7 a.m. This change was made because the service pattern was confusing to riders and because service further up the line started later than most other Manhattan bus routes during rush hour. The first northbound bus did not arrive at 65th Street until about 8 a.m.; On June 27, 2010, the route was extended from West Houston Street/Broadway to South Ferry to replace the M6 due to a budget crisis; The route was cut back to Sixth Avenue and West 31st Street on January 8, 2017, with the South Ferry to Midtown portion of the route split into the M55 route.
M7	New York City Omnibus Corporation buses route (M22 - 7) replaced New York Railways' Columbus Avenue Line streetcar on March 25, 1936.; Northbound buses were moved to Amsterdam Avenue on December 6, 1951, and to Sixth Avenue on March 10, 1957, north of 34th Street and November 10, 1963, south of 34th Street.; The southern terminus of the route was shifted to Sixth Avenue in 2009.; Southbound buses were rerouted from Broadway to run on Seventh Avenue in 2009.; Limited-stop service was introduced on February 22, 1993, but was eliminated before August 1994.
M8	New York City Omnibus Corporation bus route (M16 - 13) replaced New York Railways' Eighth Street Crosstown Line streetcar on March 3, 1936.; Designated the M13 until c. 1993, when the route was renumbered the M8.; Weekend and overnight service was discontinued on June 27, 2010, due to budget crisis. Weekend service was restored on April 6, 2014.
M9	Avenue B and East Broadway Transit Company bus (M9) replaced Dry Dock, East Broadway and Battery Railroad's Avenue B Line streetcar on July 30, 1932.; Original terminals were Battery Park City and 14th Street–Union Square station. Northern end ran via Avenue B.; Southern end originally ran via Park Row to Battery Park City. Service was rerouted via Water Street and the South Ferry–Whitehall Street station after the September 11 Attacks when Park Row was closed to vehicular traffic.; On June 27, 2010, the route was rerouted from Avenue B to Avenue C to 23rd Street due to a budget crisis. On the same date, the route was rerouted back to Park Row to replace the M15 to City Hall.; The route was extended north to 29th Street via First Avenue from 23rd Street and south to Battery Park City from City Hall on January 6, 2013.
M10	Eighth Avenue Coach Corporation bus route (M41 – soon became NYCO's 10) replaced Eighth and Ninth Avenues Railway's Eighth Avenue Line streetcar on November 12, 1935.; New York City Omnibus Corporation bus route (M24 - 8/9) replaced New York Railways' Seventh Avenue Line streetcar on March 6, 1936.; Routes combined as a one-way pair on June 6, 1954, and kept the number 10 continued south to Abingdon Square, Spring Street and Battery Park City until 1999.; In Fiscal Year 1963, the route was modified due to the conversion of some two-way streets to one-way streets. Service began running north along Hudson Street and south along Seventh Avenue.; Originally had limited-stop service in the peak direction until September 10, 1995 due to a budget crisis.; South of Penn Station split off into route M20 on January 16, 2000.; Service south of Columbus Circle ended June 27, 2010, due to another budget crisis. On April 3, 2011, service was extended two blocks south.
M11	Eighth Avenue Coach Corporation bus route (M42 – soon became NYCO's 11) replaced Eighth and Ninth Avenues Railway's Ninth Avenue Line streetcar on November 12, 1935.; Northbound buses were moved to Tenth Avenue on November 6, 1948.; Southbound buses were moved to Columbus Avenue on December 6, 1951.; On June 26, 1994, the route was extended along 135th Street and Riverside Drive to Riverbank State Park.
M12	New bus route created on August 31, 2014, to provide north–south service along Manhattan's west side.
M14A; M14D (M14)	New York City Omnibus Corporation bus route (M17 - 14) replaced New York Railways' 14th Street Crosstown Line streetcar on April 20, 1936.; Avenue D service added on January 28, 1951; initially from Broadway along 14th Street, Avenue D and Columbia Street to Stanton Street, and returning on Cannon Street and Houston Street.; In Fiscal Year 1963, the route was extended at the request of residents along the route.; Originally known as the M14 with service also along Avenue C. M14 split off into M14A, M14C, and M14D. M14C variant merged with M14D variant after 2001, but returned from 2004 to 2006 before being discontinued again.; Route was converted to be a Select Bus Service route on July 1, 2019.
M15	East Side Omnibus Corporation bus route (M15) replaced Second Avenue Railroad's Second Avenue Line streetcar and began running route (M13) on First Avenue on June 26, 1933.; The routes were combined as a one-way pair on June 4, 1951, and kept the number M15.; Limited-stop service began on September 13, 1976, with buses making only 15 stops, spaced every eight blocks, between 126th Street and Houston Street, saving riders up to 23 minutes. Limited-stop service ran every six minutes on weekdays, heading southbound in the morning, between 7:12 and 9:21 a.m., and northbound in the afternoon, between 4:12 and 6:11 p.m. These buses were identified by signs on the lower right side of the windshield. This was one of the first routes in NYC to begin limited service, the other being the Q44A (later Q46).; In January 1997, M15 South Ferry Branch service was rerouted via Allen Street and Madison Street between East Broadway and St. James Place, instead of running via East Broadway and St. James Place. The change eliminated awkward turns in Chatham Square and allowed bus service to avoid congested East Broadway. The change was expected to save two minutes in travel time.; Effective January 13, 1997, 108 weekday M15 Limited trips were added to the schedule.; The Park Row branch was eliminated on June 27, 2010, and replaced by the M9 due to a budget crisis.; Select Bus Service on the M15 began on October 10, 2010, replacing limited-stop service.
M20	This route was split from the M10 on September 16, 2000. The original M20 route is now the M116.; Service was extended to South Ferry to replace the M9 on June 27, 2010, due to a budget crisis.
M21	New York City Department of Plant and Structures bus route (M10 – soon became NYCO's 21) replaced New York Railways' Avenue C Line streetcar on September 21, 1919.; Extended to FDR Drive and weekend service discontinued on June 27, 2010, due to a budget crisis.; Weekend service was restored on January 6, 2013.; Western terminus during PM rush hours cut to Varick Street on January 3, 2022, due to rush hour traffic at the Holland Tunnel
M22	New York City Department of Plant and Structures bus route (M1) replaced New York Railways' Chambers and Madison Streets Line streetcar on September 21, 1919.; Renumbered M22 on July 1, 1974.; Overnight service was discontinued on June 27, 2010, due to a budget crisis.
M23	New York City Omnibus Corporation bus route (M18 - 15) replaced New York Railways' 23rd Street Crosstown Line streetcar on April 8, 1936.; Became M26 on July 1, 1974 and M23 c. March 1989.; Route was converted to be a Select Bus Service route on November 6, 2016.

=== Routes M31 to M79 ===
Route	History
M31	East Side Omnibus Corporation began operating bus route (M11) on June 26, 1933.; Became M31 on July 1, 1974.; The M31 was extended along 57th Street to 11th Avenue on January 9, 1994, replacing the M58. Service frequency and span of service were increased on the route.
M34; M34A	New York City Omnibus Corporation bus route (M19 - 16) replaced New York Railways' 34th Street Crosstown Line streetcar on April 1, 1936.; M16 service to Waterside was moved from the FDR Drive to Second Avenue in the 1980s.; The main route was renumbered the M34 in April 1986.; The M16 was cut from Pier 83 to Port Authority Bus Terminal on September 10, 1995, as part of a series of service cuts enacted to cover a $113 million budget deficit, eliminating overlap with the M42. Residents of the neighborhood testified at the April 18, 1996 meeting of the New York City Transit Committee of the MTA Board in opposition to the cut, and in response, NYCT studied M42 service west of 42nd Street to see if it was adequate. The study found that M42 service was adequate. However, after meeting with members of the neighborhood, the western terminal of M16 service was moved to West 43rd Street, and the first southbound stop was moved to the corner of 42nd Street and Ninth Avenue.; Select Bus Service started on November 13, 2011, and the M16 was renumbered to the M34A.; Articulated buses debuted on April 8, 2013.; Alternate trips on the M34 to/from Waterside Plaza were added on September 3, 2017.
M35	Originally the TB; became M34 (Randall's and Wards Islands), M35 (Astoria, Queens), and Bx21 on July 1, 1974; combined as the M35 in the 1980s, when M34 was applied to the 34th Street Crosstown.; Some M35 trips went to Astoria, Queens until September 10, 1995, when they were eliminated due to a budget crisis.; On June 28, 2015, westbound M35 buses were rerouted along Hell Gate Circle.
M42	Surface Transportation Corporation bus route (M106) replaced Third Avenue Railway's 42nd Street Crosstown Line streetcar on November 17, 1946.; This route was renumbered the M42 on March 30, 1986.; Service to Javits Center was discontinued on June 27, 2010, due to a budget crisis and low ridership.
M50	Originally M3 bus route; Became M27 on July 1, 1974.; Part of M27 became M50 c. 1989.; Weekend and overnight service discontinued June 27, 2010, due to a budget crisis.; Route shortened from 42nd Street to 49th Street at its eastern end and weekend service restored in July 2011.
M55	Service south of New York University was part of the M6 route. Merged with the M5 on June 27, 2010.; Split off from the M5 on January 8, 2017, serving the Midtown to South Ferry portion of the former M5.
M57	Fifth Avenue Coach Company began operating bus (20) on March 15, 1937.; The bus route was renumbered the M28 on July 1, 1974.; On September 10, 1989, the M28 (57th Street Crosstown) and M103 (59th/60th Street Crosstown) routes were merged to form the M57. M57 buses began operating from 57th Street and Sutton Place South to Broadway and 72nd Street, running via 57th Street and West End Avenue.; Service rerouted to 60th Street from 55th Street in September 2023.
M60	New route created and established on September 13, 1992, operating between the 125th Street and Lenox Avenue subway station of the 2 and 3 trains, and LaGuardia Airport's Main Central Terminal area only.; The route was extended further west from Lenox Avenue to Broadway and West 106th Street in 1997.; On June 23, 1998, weekday service was increased to run every 20 minutes between 11 a.m. and 7 p.m.; Articulated buses debuted in August 2011.; The route was converted to Select Bus Service on May 25, 2014.
M66	Comprehensive Omnibus Company began operating bus route (M7) on February 15, 1935.; Route M7 became M29 in July 1974 and M66 c. March 1989.; In November 1987, the MTA Board approved plans to reroute its eastern terminal loop and to renumber the route the M66. Eastbound service was rerouted from running east along East 68th Street, north along York Avenue, west along East 71st Street, and north along First Avenue, to running north directly along First Avenue after running east on East 68th Street. The route's terminal was moved from York Avenue and East 70th Street to York Avenue and East 69th Street. This change formalized a detour that was regularly made to avoid vehicles blocking East 68th Street between First Avenue and York Avenue. The change also eliminated two difficult turns.; Overnight service was discontinued on June 27, 2010, due to a budget crisis.
M72	The M72 was created on September 10, 1989, to provide crosstown service on 72nd Street from East 72nd Street and York Avenue to 66th Street and Freedom Place via the 65th Street Transverse.; On December 20, 2009, due to New York State Department of Transportation construction on West 72nd Street, service was rerouted to a new terminal on West 66th Street between Riverside Boulevard and Freedom Place. Due to that construction, service had been rerouted via Riverside Boulevard, West 68th Street and Freedom Place. To bypass congestion on West 68th street, westbound service was rerouted via West 66th Street to the new terminal.
M79	New York City Department of Plant and Structures began operating bus (M4 – soon became NYCO's 17) on November 30, 1921.; Operated by Green Bus Lines from 1933 to 1936, then taken over by New York City Omnibus Corporation on June 22, 1936.; On September 27, 1987, the M17 was renumbered the M79, and some minor changes were made at the route's western terminal to eliminate having the route turn around on residential streets. The route's terminal was moved from West End Avenue and 81st Street to 79th Street and Riverside Drive. Westbound buses would continue west on 79th Street past Broadway to Riverside Drive to the terminal and then loop around the traffic circle to return in eastbound service. Previously, buses had a terminal loop of Broadway, 81st Street, West End Avenue, and 79th Street.; Select Bus Service began on the route on May 21, 2017.

=== Routes M86 to M125 ===
Route	History
M86	New York City Omnibus Corporation bus (M5 - 18) replaced New York Railways' 86th Street Crosstown Line streetcar on June 8, 1936.; The M18 was renumbered the M86 on September 10, 1989, to identify the street the bus on which it operates.; Select Bus Service on the route began on July 13, 2015.
M96	New York City Department of Plant and Structures began operating bus (M6 – soon became NYCO's 19) on July 1, 1921.; Operated by Green Bus Lines from 1933 to 1936, then taken over by New York City Omnibus Corporation on June 22, 1936.; Route M19 became M96 c. May 1993.
M98	New Limited-Stop Service running between 32nd Street and Washington Heights introduced on September 14, 1987, as a rush hour only service.; Service south of 68th Street to Grand Central was discontinued on June 27, 2010, due to a budget crisis.
M100	Surface Transportation Corporation bus (Route M100) replaced Third Avenue Railway's Broadway-Kingsbridge Line streetcar on June 22, 1947.; Original northern terminus was at Riverdale-Broadway/West 230th Street.; Service was extended to 239th Street and Riverdale Avenue on February 14, 1965, to replace the former Bx10A service. The extension of the M100 ran via 231st Street, Irwin Avenue, Johnson Avenue, Kappock Street, the Henry Hudson Parkway service road, 239th Street, and Riverdale Avenue.; Service was further extended to Riverdale Avenue-West 262nd Street in July 1974.; On February 19, 1984, weekday service terminated at Henry Hudson Parkway-West 246th Street, while all weeknight late evening and all weekend service continued to Riverdale Avenue-West 262nd Street. On March 5, 1989, the M100 saw further reductions in service, as the Bronx portion was split into the Bx20, but was not extended to Riverdale-West 262nd Street. These service cuts took place in order to address unreliable service. Service initially terminated at West 207th Street-Tenth Avenue.; Service was extended from Inwood-207th Street to 220th Street-Broadway to serve the Allen Hospital, a satellite facility of NewYork-Presbyterian Hospital on September 7, 1997. Also on this date, service was extended on the route's south end from Third Avenue to Second Avenue.; In September 2013, the route was extended to First Avenue and 125th Street to provide additional service on 125th Street.; Inwood section rerouted from Broadway to Dyckman Street and Tenth Avenue on June 29, 2014.; In June 2022, service east of St. Nicholas Avenue and 125th Street was discontinued as part of a redesign of the Bronx bus system.
M101	New York City Omnibus Corporation bus (M21 - 3/4) replaced New York Railways' Lexington Avenue Line streetcar on March 25, 1936.; Surface Transportation Corporation bus (M101) replaced Third Avenue Railway's Third and Amsterdam Avenues Line streetcar on May 18, 1947.; These two routes were combined as a one-way pair on July 17, 1960, and kept the route number M101.; Limited-stop service began on October 14, 1991, with alternate buses running limited between 7 a.m. and 7 p.m.; The portion of the route south of Cooper Union was split off into route M103 on September 10, 1995 due to a budget crisis.; In June 2024, the M101 terminal was moved to Fort George Hill one block from Saint Nicholas Avenue at West 192nd Street.
M102	Route M101A was started on March 2, 1969 (formerly Fifth, Madison and Lenox Avenues route 2, ex NYCO).; Renumbered the M102 on July 1, 1974.; The portion of the route south of Cooper Union was split off into route M103 on September 10, 1995 due to a budget crisis.
M103	Former southern portion of routes M101 and M102 split off into new route on September 10, 1995 due to a budget crisis.
M104	Surface Transportation Corporation bus (M104) replaced Third Avenue Railway's Broadway Line streetcar on December 15, 1946.; On March 10, 1957, northbound service was rerouted via Eighth Avenue between 42nd Street and Columbus Circle due to the conversion of Broadway between Columbus Circle and Herald Square to one-way southbound, the conversion of Seventh Avenue from Central Park South to Times Square to one-way southbound, and the conversion of Sixth Avenue to one-way northbound between Central Park South and Herald Square.; Starting on March 22, 1976, every third bus ran up Sixth Avenue between 7:50 a.m. and 1:50 p.m.; Service along 42nd Street connecting with the M42 to 1st Avenue/United Nations was discontinued on June 27, 2010, due to a budget crisis.
M106	Manhattan and Bronx Surface Transit Operating Authority began operating bus on September 10, 1962, as the M107 on a six-month trial basis. Bus service ran every 15 minutes between 6:30 a.m. and 10:30 p.m. from Monday through Saturday, and 30 minutes during these hours on Sundays and holidays. Originally ran from 106th Street and the FDR Drive to 110th Street and Riverside Drive.; In Fiscal Year 1963, this route was extended at the request of residents along the route.; Its western terminus was cut back to 106th Street and Fifth Avenue on May 24, 1964.; Became a branch of the M19 (which is now the M96) on January 7, 1974.; The main branch of the M19 became the M96 in May 1993, and the 106th Street branch of the M19 became the M106 in 1996 when it was rerouted to use Madison and Fifth Avenues instead of Lexington and Third Avenues.
M116	New York City Omnibus Corporation bus (M20 - 20) replaced New York Railways' 116th Street Crosstown Line streetcar on April 1, 1936.; Route M20 became M116 c. 1993.; The M116 was included in the "Fare Free" pilot program and no fares were collected on this route starting late September 2023 until August 2024.
M125	New bus route created in June 2022 as part of a redesign of the Bronx bus system.; Formerly part of the Bx15 route.; On September 19, 2022, the first southbound stop on the route was moved from the intersection of Bergen Avenue and Westchester Avenue (shared with the Bx4) to the intersection of Third Avenue and East 150th Street (shared with the Bx15/Bx15-LTD). Originally, after the first stop, buses turned right on Westchester Avenue, right on Brook Avenue, right on East 145th Street, left on Willis Avenue due to construction. After construction was cleared, buses turned left on Westchester Avenue, left on Third Avenue, left on East 146th Street, right on Willis Avenue.

=== 2020s redesign ===
As part of the MTA's 2017 Fast Forward Plan to speed up mass transit service, a draft plan for a reorganization of Bronx bus routes was proposed in draft format in June 2019, with a final version published in October 2019. Many of the draft proposals were not included in the final version. These changes were set to take effect in mid-2020, but delayed due to the COVID-19 pandemic in New York City. These changes include modifications to the M100 route in Manhattan as well as the addition of a crosstown M125 bus route. The redesign took effect on June 26, 2022.

== Former routes ==
Except for early Fifth Avenue Coach Company routes, which were approved by the New York Legislature, all routes were assigned a franchise by the city, numbered in order from M1 to at least M47 and M100 to M106. Most companies used these numbers, but the New York City Omnibus Corporation (NYCOC) gave its routes numbers from 1 to 22, and the Fifth Avenue Coach Company used numbers from 1 to 20. The public designations were not changed to avoid conflicts until July 1, 1974.

=== Fifth Avenue Coach Company ===
Designation				Route	Notes
Public	1972	1974	Current	Route	Notes
1	M1	M1		Fifth Avenue	Discontinued on January 14, 1966. Replaced by rerouted New York City Omnibus route M1.
2	M2A	M2		Fifth and Seventh Avenues	
3	M3	M3		Fifth, St. Nicholas, and Convent Avenues	
4	M4	M4		Fifth Avenue and Fort Washington Avenues	
5	M5	M5		Fifth Avenue, Riverside Drive, and Broadway	
6	M6	M30	M72	72nd Street Crosstown	
15	QM15	M32	Q32	Fifth Avenue-Queensboro Bridge-Jackson Heights	
16	QM16	Q89	N/A	Elmhurst Crosstown	
19	M5	M5		Fifth Avenue and Riverside Drive	
20	M20	M28	M57	57th Street Crosstown	

=== New York City Omnibus Corporation ===
Designation					Route
Franchise	Public	1972	1974	Current	Route
M25	1/2	M1	M1		Fourth and Madison Avenues
M21	3/4	M101A	M101 and eventually M102		Lexington and Lenox Avenues
M23	5	M6			Sixth Avenue
M22	6	M6	M6		Broadway
M22	7	M7	M7		Broadway and Columbus and Lenox Avenues
M24	8/9				Seventh Avenue
M41	10	M10	M10	M10/M20	Eighth Avenue and Central Park West
M42	11	M11	M11		Ninth and Amsterdam Avenues
M2	12	M12	M12	N/A	Spring and Delancey Streets Crosstown
M16	13	M13	M13	M8	Eighth Street Crosstown
M17	14	M14	M14		14th Street Crosstown
M18	15	M15	M26	M23	23rd Street Crosstown
M19	16	M16	M16	M16/M34	34th Street Crosstown
M4	17	M17	M17	M79	79th Street Crosstown
M5	18	M18	M18	M86	86th Street Crosstown
M6	19	M19	M19	M96	96th Street Crosstown
M20	20	M20	M20	M116	116th Street Crosstown
M10	21	M21	M21		Houston Street and Avenue C Crosstown
M40	22				Pitt and Ridge Streets
M62	TB	TB	M34	M35	Manhattan-Wards Island via Triborough Bridge
MQ25	TB	TB	M35	N/A	Manhattan-Queens via Triborough Bridge
BxQ19	TB	TB	Bx21	N/A	Bronx-Queens via Triborough Bridge

=== Other companies ===
Designation				Company	Route	Notes
Franchise	Public	1974	Current	Company	Route	Notes
M1		M22	M22	Comprehensive	Madison and Chambers Streets Crosstown	
M2		M12		New York City Omnibus Corporation	Spring and Delancey Streets Crosstown	
M3		M27	M50/M27	Comprehensive	49th and 50th Streets Crosstown	
M7		M29	M66	Comprehensive	65th, 66th, 67th, and 68th Streets Crosstown	
M8			N/A	East Broadway	Grand Street Crosstown	
M9				East Broadway	Avenue B	
M10		M21		Hamilton Bus Corporation	Houston Street and Avenue C	To Triangle Bus Corporation, then to New York City Omnibus Corporation M21
M11		M31		East Side	York Avenue	
M12		M18	M86	East Side	86th Street and York Avenue	
M13		N/A		East Side	First Avenue	
M14		N/A		East Side	Astor Place Shuttle	
M15				East Side	Second Avenue	
M40			N/A	Triangle Bus Corporation	Pitt and Ridge Streets	To New York City Omnibus Corporation M22
M100				Surface	Broadway-Kingsbridge	
M101				Surface	Third Avenue-Amsterdam Avenue	
M102		N/A		Surface	125th Street Crosstown	Only operated from June 29 to July 1, 1947.
M103			N/A	Surface	59th Street Crosstown	
M104				Surface	Broadway	
M105		N/A		Surface	Tenth Avenue	
M106			M42	Surface	42nd Street Crosstown	

=== Renumbered or eliminated routes since 1962 ===
Route	Terminals		Major streets	History
M1			Madison Street, Chambers Street	This route was renumbered M22 on July 1, 1974.
M1 (FACCo)	Bleecker Street	135th Street	Fifth Avenue	Fifth Avenue Transportation Company (predecessor to Fifth Avenue Coach Company) began operating this route in 1886.; Originally ran from Bleecker Street to 89th Street.; Extended north to 135th Street on August 5, 1900.; Assigned route number 1 around 1916 or 1917.; After c. 1950s, one trip per day remained to maintain the franchise.; This route was discontinued on March 1, 1962, after MaBSTOA took over Fifth Avenue Coach operations; today's M1 is of no relation to this route.
M2 (NYCOC 12)			79th Street Crosstown	This route was renumbered M12 in 1972.
M2 (NYCO)			Fourth and Madison Avenues	Along with the current M1 (see History of the current Manhattan bus routes), replaced streetcars on the Fourth and Madison Avenues Line on February 1, 1935.; Extended west via 116th Street and north via Lenox Avenue to 146th Street on July 17, 1960, and then one block north to 147th Street on April 30, 1967.; Southbound buses moved to Fifth Avenue on January 14, 1966; was a separate and distinct route from today's M2.; This route was discontinued on March 2, 1969, and replaced north of Lenox Avenue and 116th Street by the M101A (today's M102).
M3			49th and 50th Streets Crosstown	This route was renumbered M27 on July 1, 1974.
M4 (NYCOC 17)			79th Street Crosstown	This route was renumbered M17 in 1972.
M5 (NYCOC 18)			79th Street Crosstown	This route was renumbered M18 in 1972.
M6 (NYCOC 19)			79th Street Crosstown	This route was renumbered M19 in 1972.
M6			72nd Street Crosstown	This route was renumbered M30 on July 1, 1974.
M6	South Ferry; Whitehall Street and South Street	Midtown Manhattan Sixth Avenue and Central Park South	Broadway and Sixth Avenue	New York City Omnibus Corporation buses route (M23 - 5) replaced New York Railways' Sixth Avenue Line streetcar on March 3, 1936.; New York City Omnibus Corporation buses route (M22 - 6) replaced New York Railways' Broadway Line streetcar on March 6, 1936.; The routes were combined as a one-way pair on November 10, 1963, and kept the number 6.; On March 22, 1976, a branch of the M6 started running, starting at Eighth Avenue and 41st Street, and running along 41st Street and Sixth Avenue.; The route through Midtown was shifted from Broadway to Seventh Avenue in 2009 due to the street's pedestrianization.; The route was merged into M5 on June 27, 2010, due to a budget crisis. The Seventh Avenue section was discontinued.
M7			65th Street Crosstown	The route was renumbered M29 on July 1, 1974.
M8 (first use)	Varick Street and Grand Street	FDR Drive and Grand Street	Grand Street and Broome Street,	Avenue B and East Broadway Transit Company bus (M8) replaced Dry Dock, East Broadway and Battery Railroad's Grand Street Line streetcar on July 30, 1932.; Operations taken over by Manhattan and Bronx Surface Transit Operating Authority in 1980.; In October 1987, the MTA Board approved plans to discontinue the route due to low ridership. The route's averaged fewer than 550 daily riders, or an average of 6.2 passengers per trip. The MTA expected ridership on the route to decrease further due to competition from dollar vans on the FDR Drive end of the route and because service on the route was very unreliable due to congestion at the route's western end from traffic going to the Holland Tunnel. This route suffered heavily from bunching, and because service was scheduled very infrequently, this was very irritating for riders. The route's cost recovery ratio was only 37%. 65% of passengers used the route westbound, while only 35% used it heading eastbound. On weekdays, service ran every 15 minutes during the a.m. rush hour, every 22 minutes during middays and the p.m. rush hour and every 44 minutes during evenings. On weekends, service ran every 25 minutes middays and every 50 minutes during other times. Service on the M14A was recently rerouted to run bidirectionally along Grand Street between Essex Street and the FDR Drive. To reduce the effect of the change, a free transfer was instituted between the M14 and the M15 at Essex Street and Allen Street.; This route was scheduled to be discontinued in January 1988, but the change took effect on June 26, 1988.
M10 (NYCOC 21)			Houston Street and Avenue C	The route was renumbered M21 on July 1, 1974.
M11			York Street	The route was renumbered M31 on July 1, 1974.
M12			86th Street and York Ave	The route was renumbered M18 on July 1, 1974.
M12 (first use)			Spring and Delancey Streets Crosstown	New York City Department of Plant and Structures bus route (M2 – soon became NYCO's 12) replaced New York Railways' Spring and Delancey Streets Line streetcar on September 21, 1919.; Operated by Green Bus Lines from 1933 to 1936, then taken over by New York City Omnibus Corporation on June 22, 1936.; This route was discontinued on October 26, 1979.
M13 (first use)			First Avenue	The route was combined as a one-way pair with route M15 on June 4, 1951.
M13 (second use)	William Street	↺	Journal Building Shuttle	Operated from William Street via New Chambers Street, Pike Street, Pike Slip, and South Street to Market Slip and Catherine Street.; Return route via South Street, James Slip and New Chamber Street to William Street.; Operated c.1954 to May 13, 1966, and again from February 15, 1970, to April 1, 1971.; Renumbered the M15S in the early 1960s.
M13 (third use)			see M8	
M14			Astor Place Shuttle	The route was discontinued on July 1, 1974.
M14C			14th Street and Avenue C	This variant of the M14 was eliminated in 2006, and was replaced by the M9.
M15			23rd Street Crosstown	The route was renumbered M26 on July 1, 1974.
M16 (NYCOC 13)			8th Street Crosstown	The route was renumbered M13 in 1972.
M16			34th Street	The route was renumbered M34A when Select Bus Service along 34th Street began on November 13, 2011.
M17 (NYCOC 14)			14th Street Crosstown	The route was renumbered M14 in 1972.
M17			see M79	
M18 (NYCOC 15)			23rd Street Crosstown	The route was renumbered M15 in 1972, and then M26 in 1974.
M18 (first use)			see M86	
M18 (second use)	168th Street and Broadway	Central Park North and Fifth Avenue	Convent Avenue, 116th Street	The route ran from 168th Street and Broadway to Central Park North and Fifth Avenue at all times except overnight hours.; Originally, this was the former Convent Avenue branch of the M3. Service on the branch was discontinued in 1987 for the reconstruction of a water tunnel under the street. The buses were rerouted via St. Nicholas Avenue. During the six-year long project, the NYCTA attempted to eliminate bus service. The agency would have eliminated the bus shelters if not for the pleas from community leaders. The M18 was created in 1993, restoring service to the Convent Avenue corridor. Due to a budget crisis, the route was slated to be discontinued in June 1995, saving the Transit Authority $450,000 annually. Instead of being completely discontinued, the route was truncated to Harlem on September 10, 1995.; The route was discontinued on June 27, 2010, due to another budget crisis.
M19 (NYCOC 16)			34th Street Crosstown	The route was renumbered M16 on July 1, 1974.
M19			see M96 and M106	
M20			57th Street Crosstown	The route was renumbered the M28 on July 1, 1974.
M20			see M116	
M21 (NYCOC 3/4)			Lexington Avenue, Lenox Avenue	The route was renumbered the M101A in 1972.
M22 (NYCOC 6/7)			Broadway, Columbus Avenue, Lenox Avenue	The route was extended over the M23 (New York City Omnibus Corporation 5) in 1963.; The route was renumbered into the M6 and M7 in 1972.
M23 (NYCOC 5)			Broadway	The route became part of the M22 in 1963.
M24 (NYCOC 8/9)			Seventh Avenue	By 1972 this route was discontinued.
M25 (NYCOC 1/2)			Fourth Avenue, Madison Avenue	This route was renumbered M1 in 1972.
M26			see M23	
M27			49th and 50th Streets	New York City Transit Authority began operating the route on October 11, 1971, as a variant of the M3.; The route was renumbered as the M27 in 1972.; A portion of the route became the M50 c. 1989.; The route was discontinued on June 27, 2010, due to a budget crisis.
M28			see M57	
M29			see M66	
M30			East 72nd Street, 57th Street	Fifth Avenue Coach Company began operating this route in 1900 as Route 6.; The route was renumbered as the M30 on July 4, 1974.; It was formerly operated as weekday rush hour peak direction service.; Service on the route was modified on September 10, 1989 to run during weekday rush hours in both directions.; On June 27, 2010, this route was discontinued due to a budget crisis. The route was consolidated into the M31 and M57 routes.
M32			see Q32	
M34			see M35	
M40 (NYCOC 22)			Pitt Street, Ridge Street	The route was discontinued in 1972.
M41 (NYCOC 10)			Eighth Avenue, Central Park West	The route was renumbered M10 in 1972.
M41	Eighth Avenue and 31st Street	↺		"Culture Bus Loop I" The M41 and B88 Culture Loop buses (I & II) began operating on May 26, 1973. The M41 operated from Lower Manhattan to Harlem and back. Both routes only operated during weekends and holidays, 10 AM through 6 PM. Both routes were discontinued on September 3, 1984.
M42 (NYCOC 11)			Ninth Avenue, Amsterdam Avenue	The route was renumbered M11 in 1972.
M58	Eighth Avenue and 57th Street	York Avenue and 72nd Street	57th Street	The M58 was created on September 10, 1989, as part of the restructuring of crosstown bus service along 57th Street and 72nd Street. The route was created to provide direct service between 57th Street and York Avenue. The route initially ran between Eighth Avenue/57th Street and York Avenue/72nd Street.; The M58 merged with the M31 in January 1994.
M99	Twelfth Avenue and West 42nd Street	Livonia Avenue and Ashford Street	New Lots Avenue, Rockaway Avenue, Fulton Street, Flatbush Avenue, 14th Street, 6th/10th Avenues (Northbound), 7th/11th Avenues (Southbound)	Service began June 28, 2020 while Subway service was shut down for late night cleaning efforts during the COVID-19 pandemic.; Route discontinued on June 10, 2021, following the restoration of late night Subway service on May 17, 2021.
M101A			Third Avenue, Lexington Avenue, Lenox Avenue	This route was formerly the Lenox Avenue branch of the M101.; It was renumbered M102 on July 1, 1974.
M102 (first use)			125th Street	Surface Transportation Corporation bus (M102) replaced Third Avenue Railway's 125th Street Crosstown Line streetcar on November 11, 1946.; The route was discontinued on July 1, 1947.
M103 (first use)	72nd Street and Broadway	York Avenue and 61st Street	West End Avenue and 59th Street	Surface Transportation Corporation bus (M103) replaced Third Avenue Railway's 59th Street Crosstown Line streetcar on November 11, 1946.; In Fiscal Year 1963, the route was extended to serve Lincoln Center.; On September 10, 1989, the M103 was merged with the M28 (57th Street Crosstown) to create the M57 along 57th Street.
M105			Tenth Avenue and Broadway	Surface Transportation Corporation bus (M105) replaced Third Avenue Railway's Tenth Avenue Line (Manhattan surface) streetcar on November 17, 1946.; The bus route was moved to Eleventh Avenue on November 6, 1948, when Tenth Avenue became a one-way street.; One trip per day remained after April 15, 1957, to maintain the franchise.; The route was discontinued on March 1, 1962, after MaBSTOA took over Surface operations.
M106			see M42	
M107 (first use)			Haven Avenue	This Surface Transportation Corporation bus route began operating on June 24, 1941, to connect residents of Washington Heights with a shopping district.; This was a crosstown shuttle bus route running along 180th Street and 181st Street between Haven Avenue and St. Nicholas Avenue.; This was Surface's first route in Manhattan, and the company's only route that did not replace Third Avenue Railway streetcar service.; The route ran from 7 a.m. to 1 a.m. on a 12-minute headway during rush hours and a 15-minute headway during middays.; Starting on June 7, 1942, only one franchise trip per day was operated along the route and the route was discontinued on May 30, 1943.
M107 (second use)			see M96 and M106	
train shuttle bus			Service between Harlem–148th Street and 135th Street	This route operated overnights only, when late night 3 train service was suspended from 1990 to 1994, and again from 1995 to 2008, and provided customers at 135th Street subway access to the train.
Grand Street Shuttle bus			Service between Canal Street and Grand Street	This route operated when the Sixth Avenue tracks of the Manhattan Bridge were closed from 2001 to 2004, and provided customers at Grand Street access to Brooklyn.
M191 train shuttle bus			Service between 191 Street and 181 St via Broadway and St. Nicholas Avenue	Started February 1, 2020 and discontinued during the Covid-19 pandemic.

=== NYC Ferry ===
A clockwise "loop" bus via 34th Street, Sixth Avenue, 48th Street, and Lexington Avenue operates during peak hours to/from East 34th Street Ferry Landing. It was discontinued in early 2024.
