= Grand Street Line =

Grand Street Line may refer to the following transit lines:

- Grand Street Line (Brooklyn), a public transit line in Brooklyn and Queens, New York, running mostly along Grand Street/Grand Avenue between Williamsburg, Brooklyn, and Maspeth, Queens, originally a streetcar line, now a bus route
- Grand Street Line (Manhattan), a public transit line in Manhattan, originally a streetcar line, now a bus route; see List of bus routes in Manhattan#Other companies
- Grand Street Shuttle Bus, a former public transit line in Manhattan, with service between Canal Street and Grand Street, operated when the Sixth Avenue tracks of the Manhattan Bridge were closed from 2001 to 2004, to provide customers at Grand Street access to Brooklyn; see List of bus routes in Manhattan#Renumbered or eliminated routes since 1962
