= 42nd Street Line =

42nd Street Line may refer to:

- IRT 42nd Street Shuttle, Manhattan, New York City, United States
- The IRT Flushing Line runs partially under 42nd Street in Manhattan
- 42nd Street Crosstown Line (Manhattan surface), now the M42 bus route
