= Bx7, Bx20, and M100 buses =

Bus routes in Manhattan and The Bronx, New York

bx7, bx20, m100
- Broadway-Kingsbridge Line; Amsterdam Avenue/Broadway/Riverdale Avenue
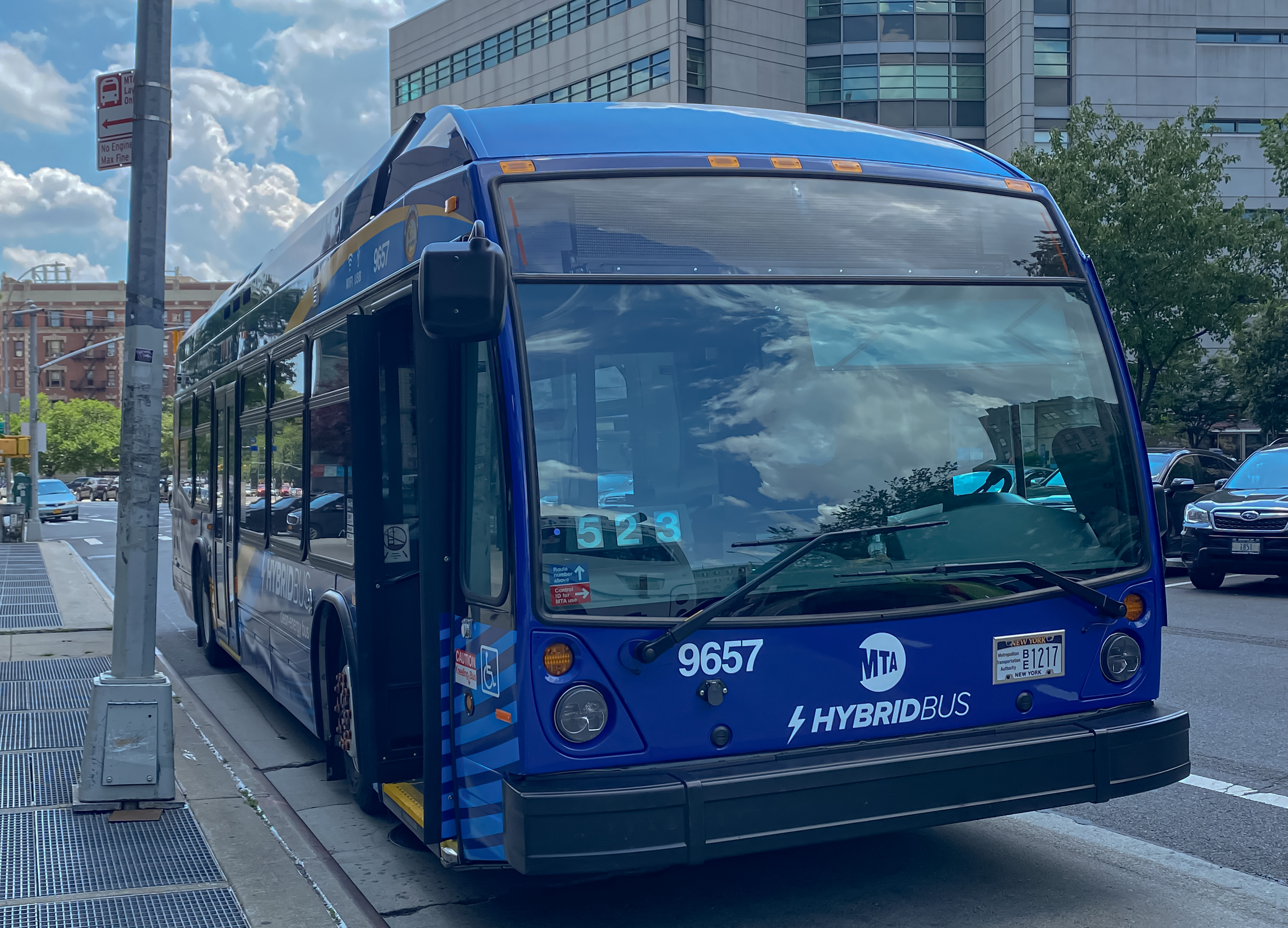
- A 2021 Nova Bus LFS HEV (9657) on the Bx7

Overview
- System: MTA Regional Bus Operations
- Operator: Manhattan and Bronx Surface Transit Operating Authority
- Garage: Kingsbridge Depot
- Vehicle: Nova Bus LFS; Nova Bus LFS HEV; Nova Bus LFSe+
- Began service: February 12, 1928 (Bx7); March 5, 1989 (Bx20); June 22, 1947 (M100)

Route
- Locale: The Bronx and Manhattan, New York, U.S.
- Communities served: Harlem, Manhattanville, Washington Heights, Fort George, Inwood, Marble Hill, Kingsbridge, Spuyten Duyvil, Riverdale
- Start: Washington Heights - St. Nicholas Avenue & 167th Street (Bx7); Inwood - Broadway & 207th Street (Bx7 early morning and late evenings, Bx20); Manhattanville - St. Nicholas Avenue & 125th Street (M100)
- Via: Amsterdam Avenue (M100), Broadway, Riverdale Avenue (Bx7)
- End: Riverdale - Riverdale Avenue & 263rd Street (Bx7); Riverdale - Henry Hudson Parkway & 246th Street (Bx20); Inwood – Broadway & 220th Street (M100)
- Length: 6 miles (9.7 km) (Bx7); 3.4 miles (5.5 km) (Bx20); 5.9 miles (9.5 km) (M100)
- Other routes: Bx10 Norwood/Riverdale Avenue; M60 SBS 125th Street/LaGuardia Airport; M101 3rd/Lexington Avenues/125th Street/Amsterdam Avenue; M125 125th Street/The Hub

Service
- Operates: Rush hours (Bx20); All times except late nights (Bx7, M100)
- Annual patronage: 2,778,046 (Bx7, 2025); 96,998 (Bx20, 2025); 1,945,027 (M100, 2025)
- Transfers: Yes
- Timetable: Bx7 Bx20 M100

The Broadway-Kingsbridge Line is a public transit line in Manhattan, running primarily along Broadway in Upper Manhattan. Originally a streetcar line, it is now the Bx7, Bx20 and M100 bus routes, all operated by MaBSTOA as a subdivision of MTA Regional Bus Operations.

== Route description and service ==
=== Streetcar line ===
The Broadway-Kingsbridge Line, operated by the Third Avenue Railway, ran from Third Avenue and East 125th Street, running west on 125th Street, north on Amsterdam Avenue, northwest on St. Nicholas Avenue, and northwest on Broadway to 225th Street in Marble Hill. The line ran under the designation "K".

=== Current bus service ===
The M100 begins at St. Nicholas Avenue and 125th Street, running west on 125th Street until Amsterdam Avenue, where it turns north until reaching St. Nicholas Avenue, where it runs northwest on until it reaches 168th Street, where it is joined by the Bx7. Together, both routes continue north onto Broadway until reaching Dyckman Street, where between here and 218th Street, the Bx7 continues north on Broadway whereas the M100 heads southeast on Dyckman Street to serve 10th Avenue and continue north on it from there. At Broadway and 207th Street, the Bx7 is joined by the Bx20, and both continue north on Broadway until 218th Street, where 10th Avenue merges into Broadway and the three routes run together for two blocks before the M100 terminates at 220th Street, with southbound buses looping on 9th Avenue to return to 10th Avenue at 215th Street, passing by Kingsbridge Depot, which all three routes are based out of. The Bx7 and Bx20 then continue north into the Bronx, turning west at 231st Street (with southbound buses running via Kingsbridge Avenue and 230th Street, instead). The Bx7 continues north on Riverdale Avenue while the Bx20 heads south Irwin/Johnson Avenues, running west onto Kappock Street and north on Henry Hudson Parkway until 239th Street, where Riverdale Avenue temporarily merges into Henry Hudson Parkway, where both routes continue north on the service road until 246th Street, where the Bx20 ends. The Bx7 continues north and turns north onto Riverdale Avenue after it splits off from Henry Hudson Parkway until Riverdale Avenue until 263rd Street (Bronx-Westchester County Line), where it terminates. Early morning and late evening Bx7 trips only run between 207th Street and 263rd Street.

=== School trippers ===
When school is in session, an extra Bx20 trip departs Riverdale Kingsbridge Academy at Independence Avenue & 237th Street at 2:45pm. This trip heads to Henry Hudson Parkway via 236th Street before operating the rest of its southbound route.

== History ==
The Bx7 was initiated on February 12, 1928, as the Bx10, with the routing in April changed to run between Riverdale-West 262nd Street and Broadway-West 234th Street, running via Spuyten Duyvil.

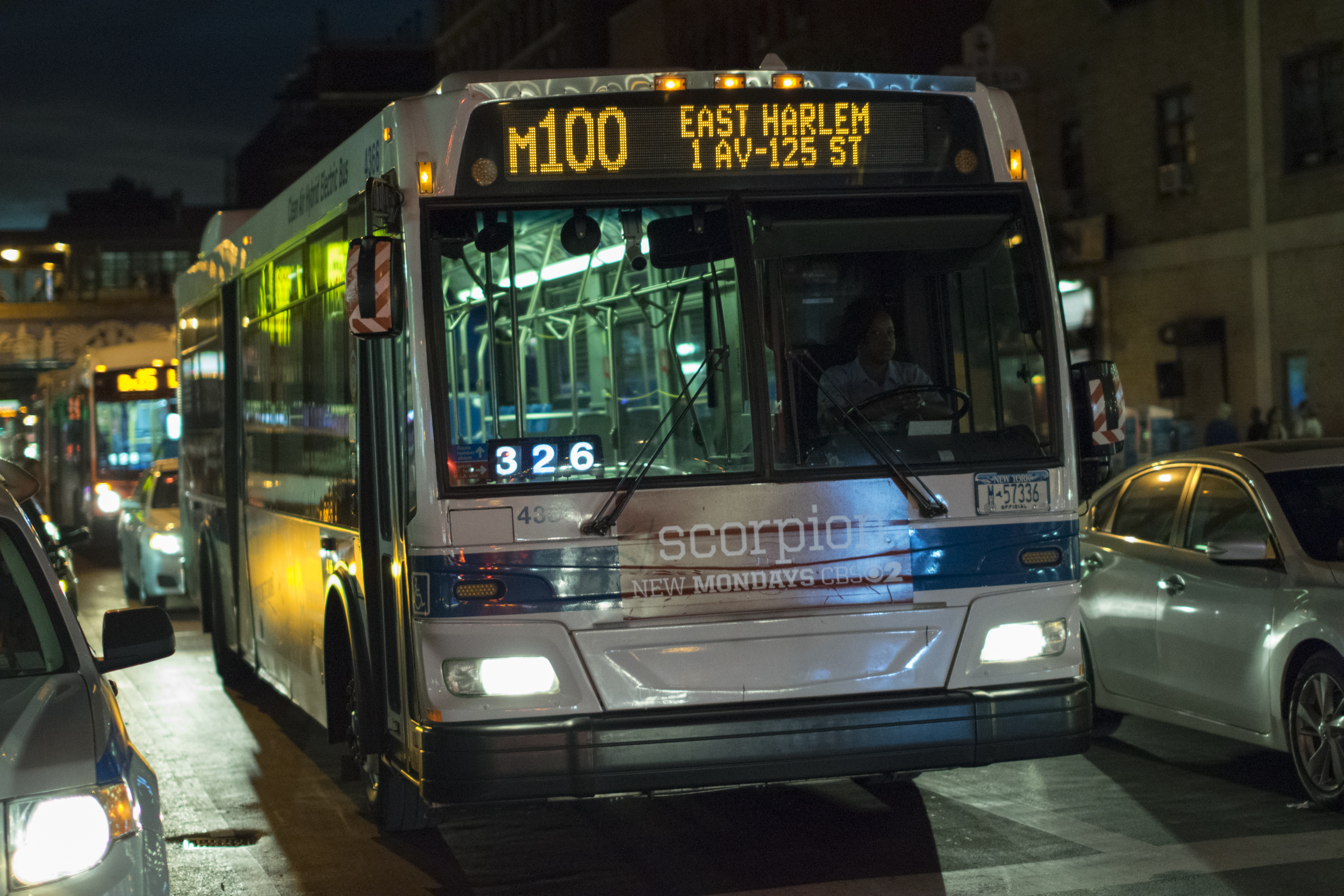
A 2009 Orion VII NG HEV (4366) on the East Harlem-bound M100 traveling along East 125th Street in 2014

On June 22, 1947, the M100 was started up by the Surface Transportation Corporation to replace the Third Avenue Railway's Broadway-Kingsbridge Line streetcar, with the M100's northern terminus being a little further north of the streetcar's northern terminus at 230th Street. The Bx10 had 3 different service patterns, the Bx10, Bx10A and Bx10B, until February 14, 1965, when the M100 was extended to 239th Street and Riverdale Avenue via Spuyten Duyvil to replace the Bx10A branch.

On July 1, 1974, the Bx10B branch was extended from its original terminus at Waldo Avenue and Manhattan College Parkway to Fieldston Road and West 256th Street, becoming a rush hour only split branch service of the Bx10. On this same date, the M100 was extended to Riverdale Avenue and West 262nd Street. On February 19, 1984, the Bronx Bus system underwent a restructuring, in which weekday daytime service on the M100 north of 246th Street was discontinued and the Bx10 was renumbered to the Bx7, with the split-branch service to Fieldston Road and West 256th Street being eliminated.

On March 5, 1989, to make service more reliable, M100 service north of Isham Street was split off into the Bx20, although the Bx20 would only run to 246th Street. M100 service was rerouted to West 207th Street and 10th Avenue. In 1990, Bx7 service was expanded from weekdays only to all times except late nights, replacing Bx1 service north of 231st Street, and extended from 207th Street to 168th Street, with late night service north of Inwood being introduced in March 1993.

On September 10, 1995, as part of MTA service changes, Sunday service on the Bx20 was discontinued due to low ridership. The M100 was extended on its southern end from 3rd Avenue-125th Street to 2nd Avenue-127th Street and on its northern end from Inwood-207th Street to Broadway and West 220th Street on September 7, 1997. The latter change was done to provide service to Allen Hospital. To make subway access easier, the Bx20 was extended a short distance from Isham Street to 207th Street on January 13, 1997.

Due to a MTA budget crisis, Bx20 off-peak and Saturday service was discontinued on June 27, 2010. In September 2013, the M100 was extended to First Avenue and 125th Street to provide extra crosstown service on 125th Street. On June 29, 2014, the M100's routing in Inwood was changed from running via Broadway to running via Dyckman Street and 10th Avenue. This change was controversial, as business owners along Broadway in Inwood believed they would lose profits due to decreased foot traffic from the loss of the M100, however, Sherman Creek residents praised the change as it would allow for them to commute to East Harlem and other areas more easily. In 2015, due to renovations for the Triborough Bridge, the M100 was cut back to its previous terminal at Second Avenue-127th Street. Although this project had concluded as of 2019, the M100 was never extended back to First Avenue.

As part of the MTA's 2017 Fast Forward Plan to speed up mass transit service, a draft plan for a reorganization of Bronx bus routes was proposed in draft format in June 2019, with a final version published in October 2019. The plan included the truncation of the M100 to 125th Street-Amsterdam Avenue, with service along 125th Street replaced by the M125. In the final plan, it was revised to terminate at 125th Street-St. Nicholas Avenue instead. This change was proposed to be implemented by mid-2020. Due to the COVID-19 pandemic in New York City, the changes were halted for over a year. The redesign took effect on June 26, 2022.
