= Surface Transportation Corporation =

American bus operator in New York City

The Surface Transportation Corporation was the bus-operating subsidiary of the Third Avenue Railway in New York City which operated under that name following the conversion of the streetcar lines in Manhattan and the Bronx to bus service between March 1941 and August 1948. On December 17, 1956, the corporation was bought by Fifth Avenue Coach Lines, Inc. (formerly New York City Omnibus Corporation) as part of its acquisition of the Third Avenue Railway, and its routes placed under a newly created operating subsidiary, Surface Transit, Inc.

== Bus routes ==
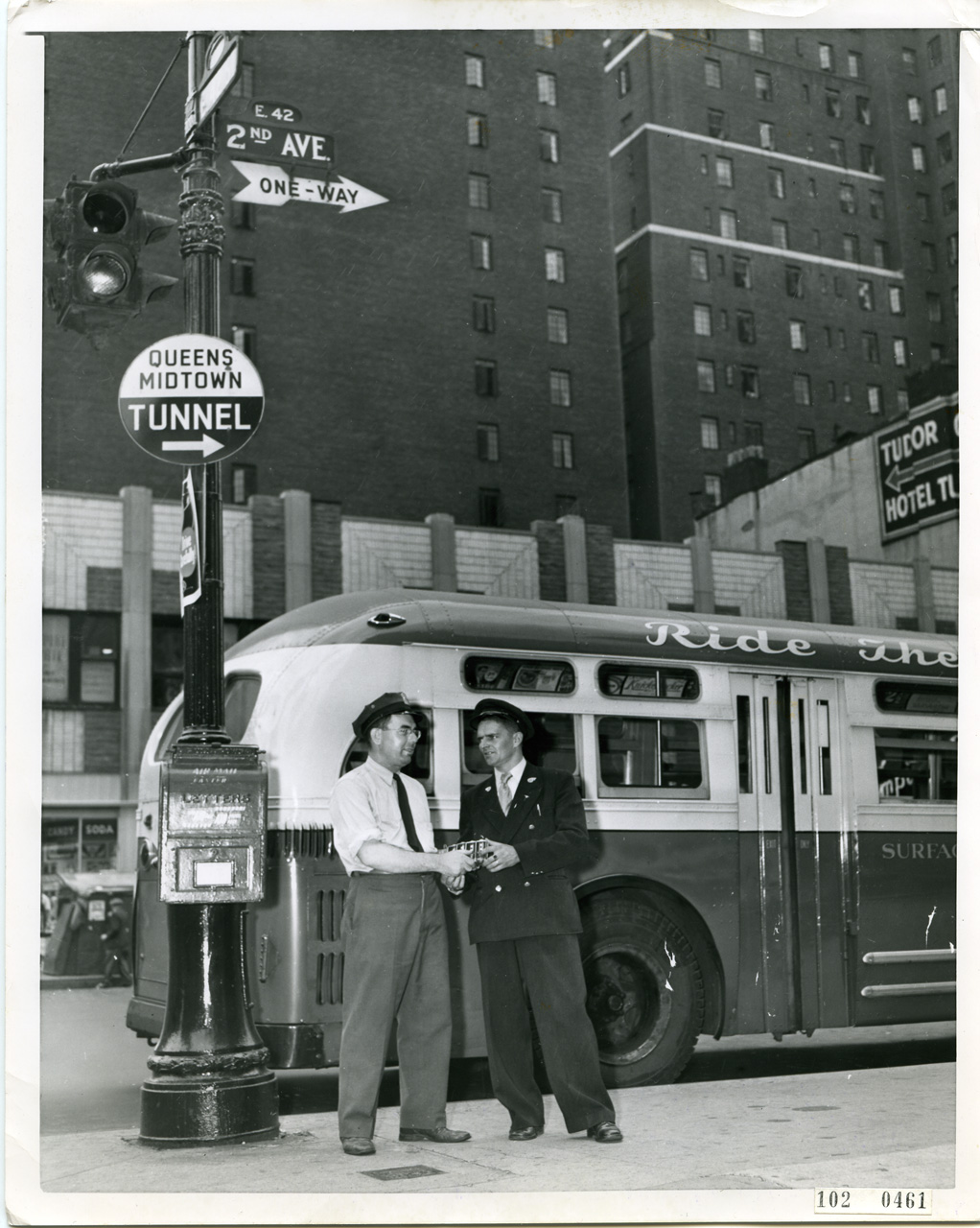
19 September 1952

Surface Transportation inherited the following former trolley lines:

- M100: Broadway-Kingsbridge Line
- M101: Third Avenue-Amsterdam Avenue Line
- M102: 125th Street Crosstown Line
- M103: 59th Street Crosstown Line
- M104: Broadway Line
- M105: Tenth Avenue Line
- M106: 42nd Street Crosstown Line
