= M104 (New York City bus) =

Bus route in Manhattan, New York

m104
- Broadway Line
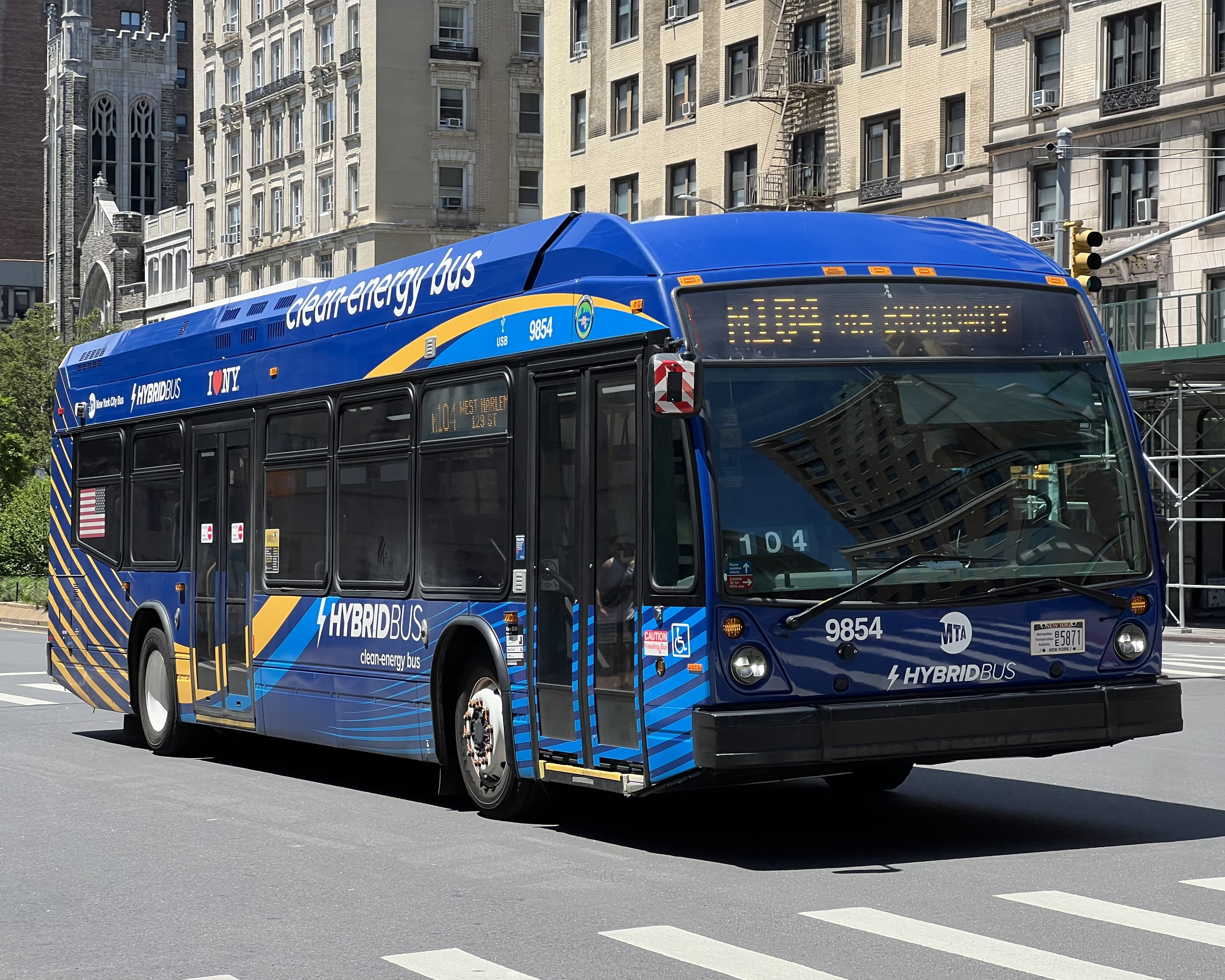
- A 2021 Nova Bus LFS HEV (9854) on the West Harlem-bound M104 in 2024

Overview
- System: MTA Regional Bus Operations
- Operator: Manhattan and Bronx Surface Transit Operating Authority
- Garage: Manhattanville Depot
- Vehicle: Orion VII NG HEV; Nova Bus LFS HEV; New Flyer Xcelsior XDE40
- Began service: 1884-5 (train); 1946 (bus); 2010 (current alignment)

Route
- Locale: Manhattan, New York, U.S.
- Start: West Harlem – 129th Street
- Via: Seventh Avenue (southbound); Eighth Avenue (northbound); Broadway
- End: Midtown – 41st Street / 8th Avenue
- Length: 5.6 miles (9.0 km) (southbound)
- Annual patronage: 2,052,751 (2025)
- Transfers: Yes
- Timetable: M104

The Broadway Line is a surface transit line in Manhattan, New York City, running mainly along 42nd Street and Broadway from Times Square to Harlem. Formerly a streetcar line operated by the Third Avenue Railway, it is now the M104 bus route operated by MaBSTOA, a division of MTA Regional Bus Operations. This bus route no longer runs along the entire route of the former streetcar.

== Route description ==
The M104 route begins at 41st Street and 8th Avenue, by Times Square. Buses use Eighth Avenue (northbound) and Seventh Avenue (southbound) to and from Central Park South. The route continues north on Broadway through the Upper West Side, finally turning off at 125th Street, where it turns around at a clockwise loop on Amsterdam Avenue, 129th Street, Convent Avenue, and 125th Street.

== History ==
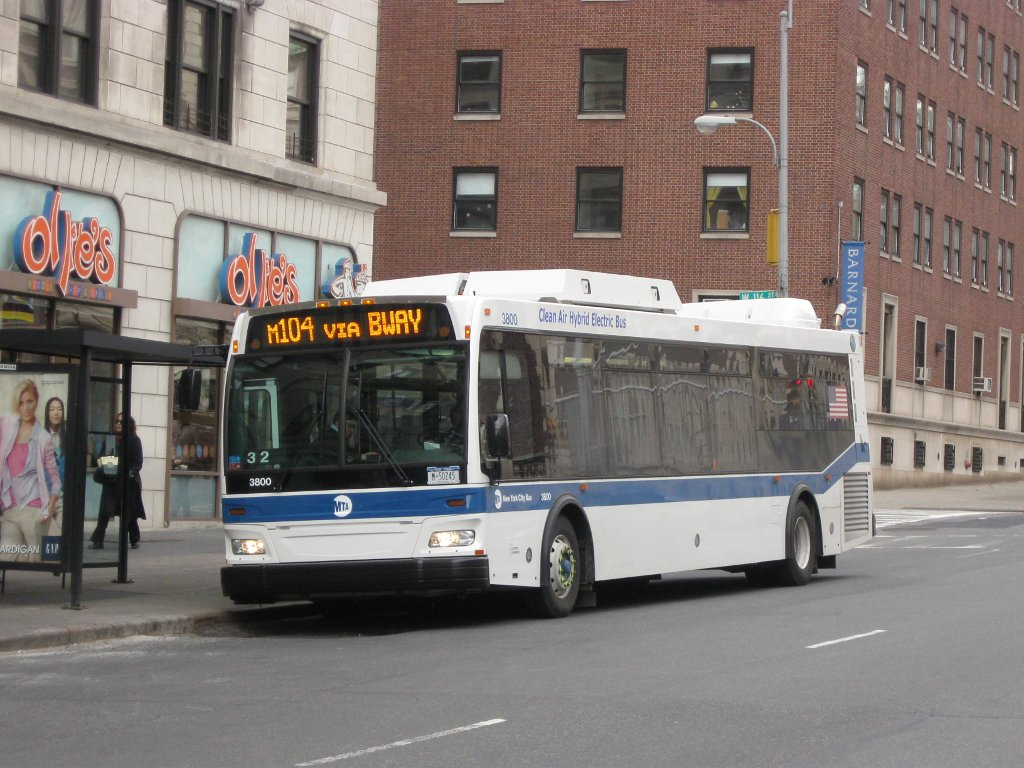
A 2008 Orion VII NG HEV (3800) on the M104 on Broadway near Columbia University

The Forty-second Street, Manhattanville and St. Nicholas Avenue Railway opened the Boulevard Line in 1884 or 1885, following the 42nd Street Crosstown Line from the East 34th Street Ferry along First Avenue (trackage rights over the Central Park, North and East River Railroad's East Belt Line) and 42nd Street to Times Square, using new trackage on Broadway (then Boulevard) to 125th Street, and turning west on 125th Street over the tracks of the One-Hundred and Twenty-Fifth Street Railroad's 125th Street Crosstown Line to the Fort Lee Ferry. The Third Avenue Railroad acquired control of the line in November 1895, and the Metropolitan Street Railway leased the Third Avenue in May 1900.

Effective February 17, 1908, as part of the splitting of the Third Avenue Railroad from the bankrupt Metropolitan Street Railway, the Third Avenue's Broadway cars were sent along their old route, heading east on 42nd Street at Times Square and ending at the East 34th Street Ferry via First Avenue. Simultaneously, the Metropolitan introduced a new line, the Broadway and Amsterdam Avenue Line, running from Broadway and Houston Street along Broadway, Seventh Avenue, 53rd Street, Ninth Avenue, Columbus Avenue, Broadway, and Amsterdam Avenue to 125th Street. This was done because the Third Avenue's Broadway trackage ended at Times Square; south of Times Square was Metropolitan trackage.

In June 2010, due to budget cuts, the M104 bus route was truncated to Times Square from the Headquarters of the United Nations, eliminating service along 42nd Street.
