= M50 (New York City bus) =

Bus route in Manhattan, New York

m50
- 49th/50th Streets Crosstown
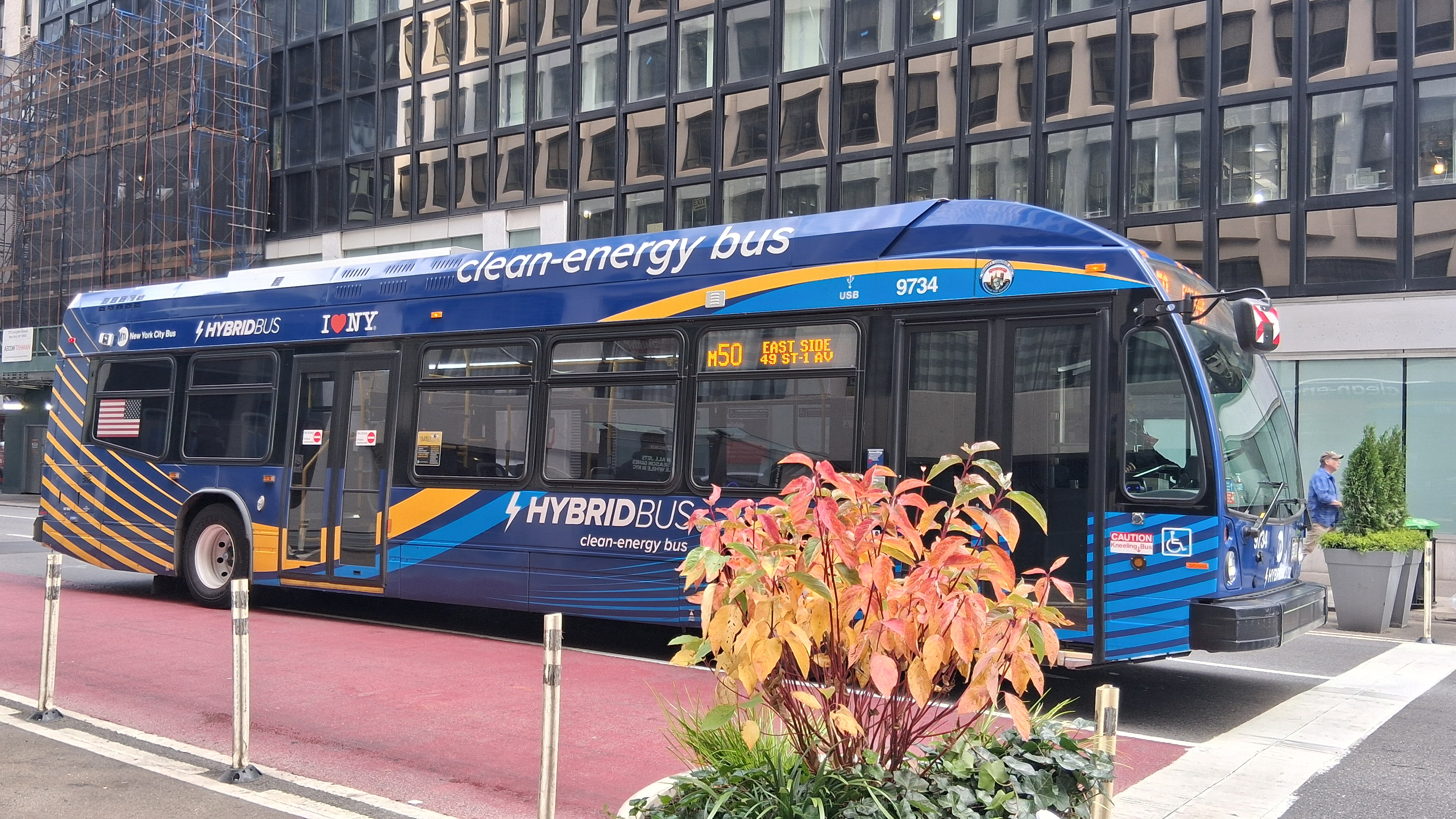
- A 2021 LFS HEV (9734) on the East Side-bound M50

Overview
- System: MTA Regional Bus Operations
- Operator: Manhattan and Bronx Surface Transit Operating Authority
- Garage: Michael J. Quill Depot
- Vehicle: New Flyer Xcelsior XD40; New Flyer Xcelsior XE40; Nova Bus LFS HEV
- Began service: 1933

Route
- Locale: Manhattan, New York, U.S.
- Communities served: East Midtown, Midtown, West Midtown
- Start: East Side - 49th Street & First Avenue
- Via: 12th Avenue; 49th Street (westbound); 50th Street (eastbound)
- End: West Midtown/Circle Line Sightseeing Cruises – Twelfth Avenue & 42nd Street (Pier 83)
- Length: 2.3 miles (3.7 km)
- Other routes: M42 42nd Street Crosstown

Service
- Operates: All times except late nights
- Annual patronage: 605,989 (2025)
- Transfers: Yes
- Timetable: M50

The M50 is a public transit line in Manhattan, running primarily along 49th and 50th Streets in Midtown Manhattan. Originally a private bus line started by Green Bus Lines in 1933, it is currently operated by MaBSTOA, a subdivision of MTA Regional Bus Operations.

== Route description ==
The M50 begins at Pier 83 on the West Side, traveling north along 12th Avenue before running east along 50th Street to Second Avenue, where it transitions via Second Avenue to running on 48th Street to First Avenue before making two consecutive left turns onto 49th Street, where it terminates. The M50 westbound routing is the same as the eastbound routing, except that it uses 49th Street instead between First and Twelfth Avenues.

== History ==
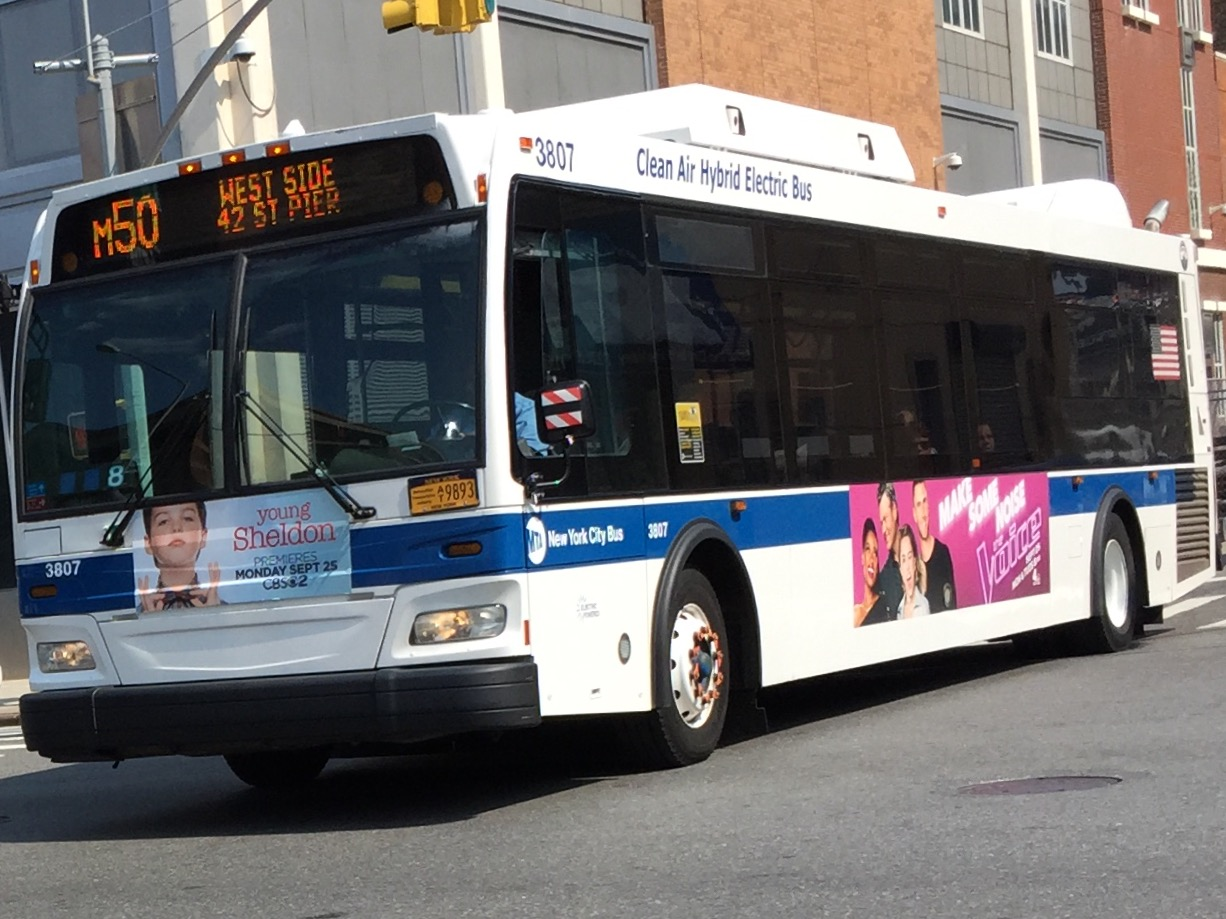
A 2008 Orion VII NG HEV (3807) on the West Side-bound M50

In 1933, Green Bus Lines had initially received one-year franchises to operate six Manhattan crosstown bus routes, one of which was the M3. The M3 was transferred to the Comprehensive Omnibus Corporation in 1935 and to the New York City Omnibus Corporation in 1936.

On July 1, 1974, the M3 was relabeled as the M27. Circa 1989, the M27 became a part of the M50, which ran to Pier 83.

On June 27, 2010, due to budget shortfalls within the MTA, the M27 was eliminated and M50 weekend service was discontinued. These changes were expected to save $1,900,000 annually, although weekend service on the M50 was brought back in exchange for truncating the eastern end of the route to 49th Street from United Nations on July 3, 2011.

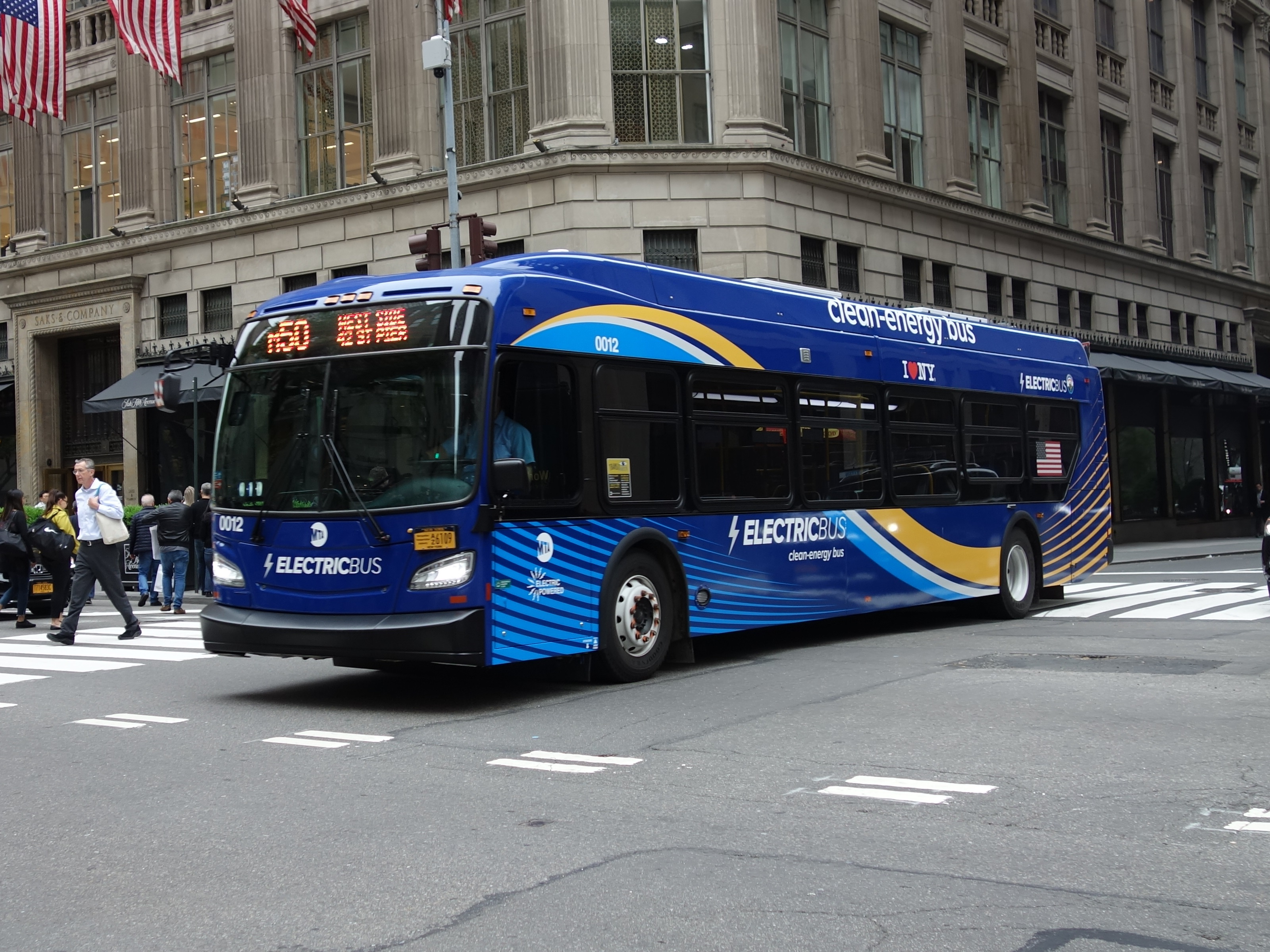
A 2017 XE40 (0012) on the West Side-bound M50 at 49th Street/5th Avenue, used as a short-term test bus
