= Third and Lexington Avenues Line =

Bus routes in Manhattan, New York

m98, m101 m101, m102, m103
- Third and Lexington Avenues Line
- A 2012 Nova Bus LFSA (5986) operating on the M102 bound for Harlem

Overview
- System: MTA Regional Bus Operations
- Operator: Manhattan and Bronx Surface Transit Operating Authority
- Garage: Manhattanville Depot (M98); Tuskegee Airmen Depot (M101-M103)
- Vehicle: Orion VII NG HEV (M98 only); New Flyer Xcelsior XDE40 (M98 only); Nova Bus LFS HEV (M98 main; M101-M103 supplemental); Nova Bus LFS articulated (M101-M103); New Flyer Xcelsior XD60 (M101-M103)
- Began service: 1853 (train); 1947 (bus); 2010 (current alignment)

Route
- Locale: Manhattan, New York, U.S.
- Start: M98: Upper East Side – 68th Street; M101-M102: East Village – 6th Street; M103: City Hall
- Via: Third Avenue (northbound); Lexington Avenue (southbound)
- End: M98: Washington Heights – Cabrini Boulevard; M101: Fort George – 193rd Street; M102: Harlem – 147th Street; M103: East Harlem – 125th Street
- Length: M98 SB: 7.2 miles (11.6 km); M101 SB: 10.7 miles (17.2 km); M102 SB: 7.5 miles (12.1 km); M103 SB: 7.8 miles (12.6 km)
- Other routes: M1 5th/Madison Avs/Broadway; M2 5th/Madison Avs/Powell Blvd; M3 5th/Madison/St Nicholas Avs; M4 5th/Madison Avs/110th St/Ft Washington Av/Broadway

Service
- Operates: 24 hours (M101-3); Rush hours only (M98)
- Annual patronage: 305,655 (M98, 2025); 4,536,742 (M101, 2025); 2,856,179 (M102, 2025); 2,716,557 (M103, 2025)
- Transfers: Yes
- Timetable: M98 M101 M102 M103

The Third and Lexington Avenues Line, also known as the Third Avenue Line, is a public transit line in Manhattan, New York City, running from Lower Manhattan to Fort George in Washington Heights. Originally a streetcar line, it now consists of the M98, M101, M102, and M103 bus routes, operated by the Manhattan and Bronx Surface Transit Operating Authority under the New York City Transit brand. The M98 bus route operates on Third Avenue between East 65th Street and East 127th Street, although it previously continued to 32nd Street. The M101, M102 and M103 bus routes run southbound on Lexington Avenue north of East 24th Street.

== Current bus service ==
=== M98 ===
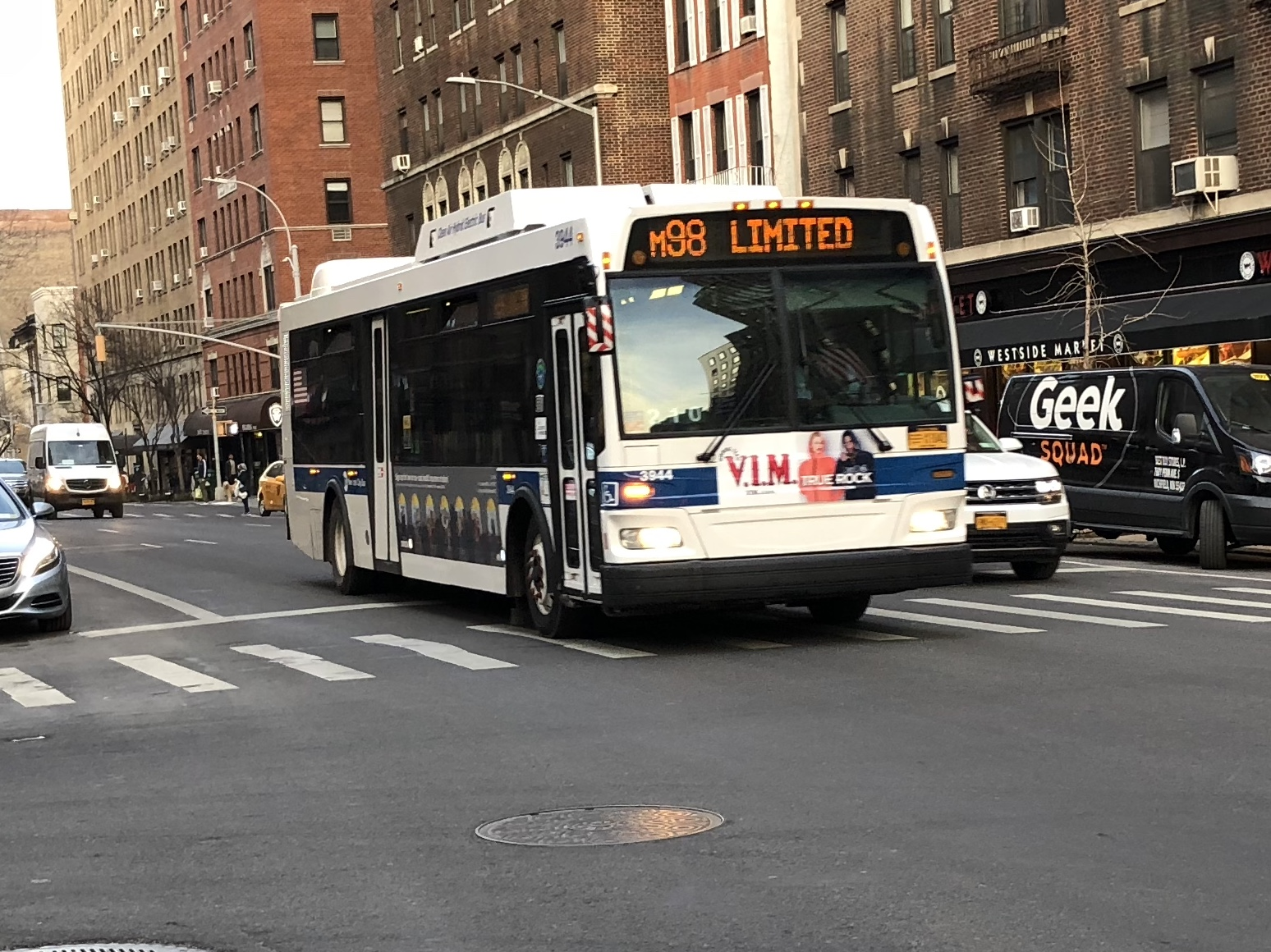
A 2008 Orion VII NG HEV (3944) on Upper East Side-bound M98 Limited at Lexington Avenue/East 92nd Street. This bus is retired.

The M98 operates between Hunter College at East 68th Street on the Upper East Side and Fort Tryon Park in Inwood near West 192nd Street. The M98 operates northbound via Third Avenue, and southbound via Lexington Avenue. At East 120th Street, southbound service shifts from Park to Lexington Avenues, while at East 127th Street, the M98 northbound service shifts onto the Harlem River Drive. The M98 exits the Harlem River Drive via the Interstate 95/Amsterdam Avenue exit. The M98 travels westbound along West 179th Street and eastbound along West 178th Street between Amsterdam Avenue and Fort Washington Avenue, where the M98 turns north on Fort Washington Avenue until its terminal at the entrance to Fort Tryon Park.

=== M101 ===
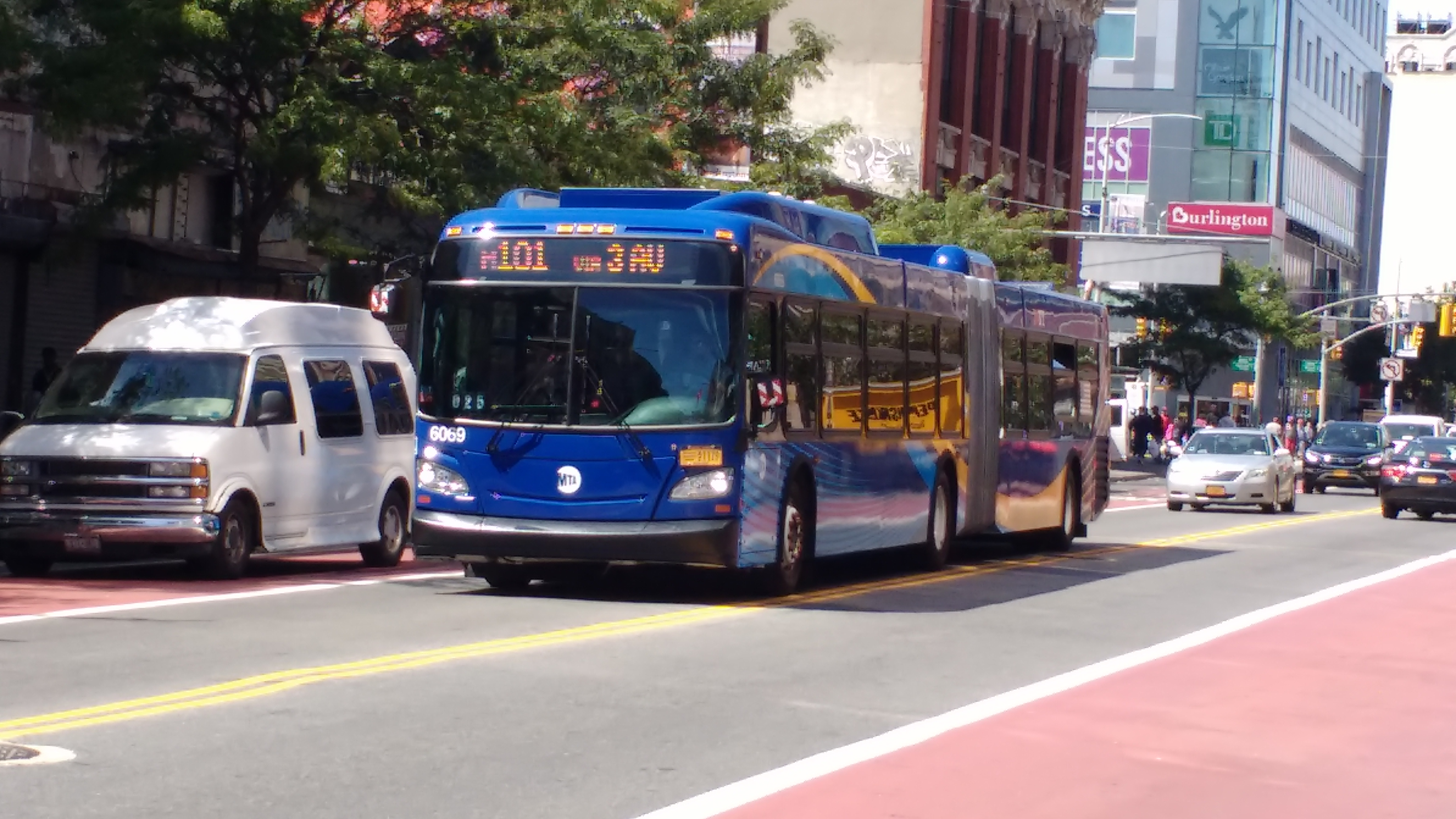
A 2017 XD60 (6069) on the East Village-bound M101 traveling along 125th Street

The M101 spans between Cooper Square in the East Village and Fort George Avenue in Fort George. The M101 runs northbound along Third Avenue from Astor Place to East 125th Street, while southbound buses use Lexington Avenue north of East 24th Street. The M101 continues crosstown on 125th Street to Amsterdam Avenue, running north towards West 193rd Street after Amsterdam Avenue becomes Fort George Avenue. To begin the southbound trip, the M101 makes its first stop at Fort George Avenue and Fort George Hill, then turns south onto Saint Nicholas Avenue, then left (east) onto West 190th Street, followed by a right (south) back onto Amsterdam Avenue. Some northbound buses terminate at 125th Street & Amsterdam Avenue or in both directions at 96th Street.

The M101 runs as a limited-stop service during the day south of East 125th Street, with no other local service. Local service is provided by the M102 and M103 buses, during that time. Overnight and weekend morning service runs local.

=== M102 ===
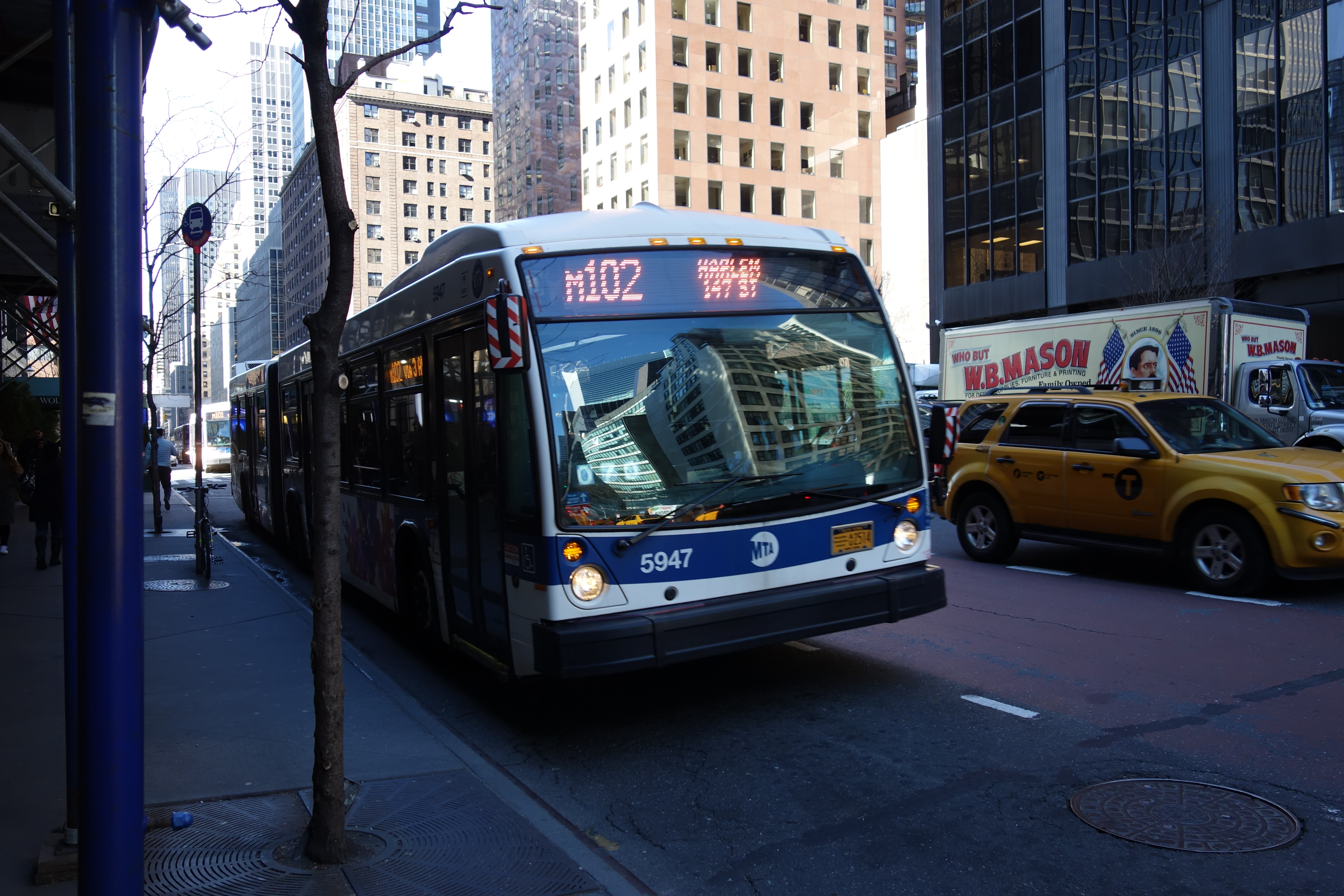
A 2012 Nova Bus LFS Articulated (5947) on the Harlem-bound M102 at 50th St/3rd Ave

The M102 begins at Cooper Square and follows the M101 until East 116th Street in East Harlem. The route travels west across 116th Street to Lenox Avenue, where it continues north to the Harlem–148th Street subway station.

=== M103 ===
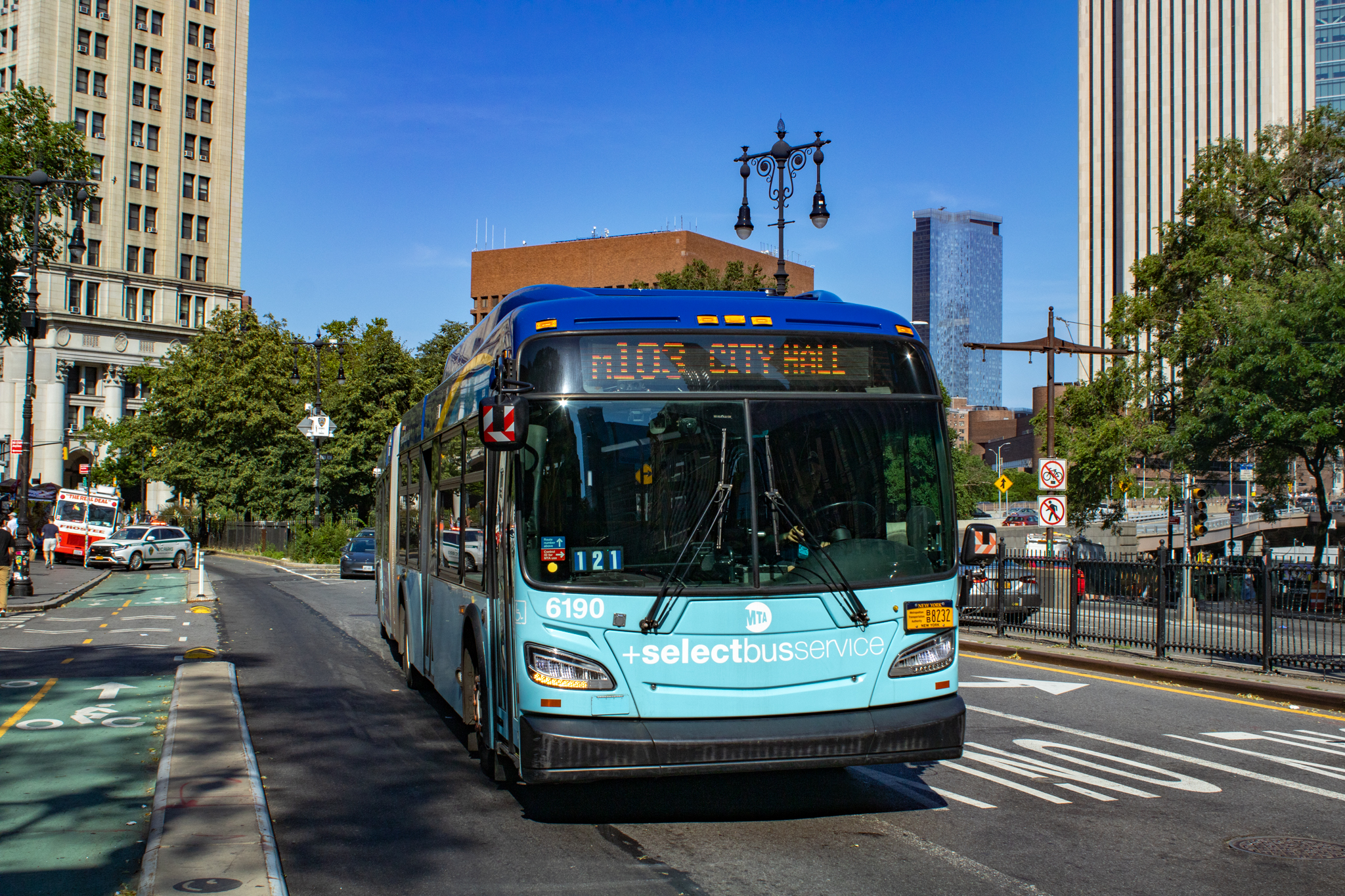
A 2019 New Flyer XD60 (6190) on the City Hall-bound M103

The M103 begins its route at City Hall and travels north via Park Row and the Bowery. At Astor Place, it continues north alongside the M101 and M102 along Third to East 125th Street, where it terminates. Southbound service uses Lexington Avenue from East 125th to 24th Streets, then uses Third Avenue, Bowery, and Park Row.

== History ==
=== Streetcar service ===
The Third Avenue Railroad opened a line in 1853, from Astor House at Broadway and Park Row to 86th Street, running north along Park Row, Bowery, where it shared tracks with the Second Avenue Line, and Third Avenue. In 1859, an extension to East Harlem opened. Using the 125th Street Crosstown Line and tracks along Amsterdam Avenue, Third Avenue cars were also operated to Fort George. A trolley park called the Fort George Amusement Park operated at that end of the line from 1895 to 1914.

=== Bus service ===
New York Railways' Lexington Avenue Line streetcar was replaced by New York City Omnibus Corporation (NYCO) bus (M21 - 3/4) on March 25, 1936. In 1936, the NYCO and Fifth Avenue were placed under common ownership. In 1941, Surface Transportation Corporation began operating former Third Avenue Railway routes. The Third Avenue Railway's Third Avenue and Amsterdam Avenue Line streetcar was replaced by the M101 bus operated by the Surface Transportation Corporation on May 18, 1947.

On July 17, 1960, Third Avenue north of 24th Street became one-way northbound, and southbound buses were moved to Lexington Avenue, and the two parallel bus lines were combined as a one-way pair, keeping the route number M101.

After a strike in 1962, the entire Fifth Avenue system was transferred to the newly formed Manhattan and Bronx Surface Transit Operating Authority on March 22, 1962.

Route M101A, formerly NYCO Fifth, Madison and Lenox Avenues route 2, was started on March 2, 1969. This route was renumbered the M102 on July 1, 1974.

=== Limited-stop service ===
New M98 Limited Stop service running between 32nd Street and Washington Heights was introduced on September 14, 1987, as a rush hour-only service. A public hearing had been held on March 12, 1987 concerning the proposed introduction of the route. Service initially ran every 15 minutes between 6:30 and 9:30 a.m. southbound, and every 15 minutes northbound from 4 to 7 p.m.. with service every 30 minutes in the reverse-peak. Stops were added to the route in response to community requests at 187th Street, 125th Street, 116th Street and 107th Street. The route was designed to keep the number of stops to a minimum to attract ridership.

Limited-stop service on the M101 began on October 14, 1991, with alternate buses running limited between 7 a.m. and 7 p.m.

On September 10, 1995, the M103 was created to improve reliability along Third and Lexington Avenues, curtailing the M101 and M102 south of Astor Place.

On June 27, 2010, due to shortfalls in the Metropolitan Transportation Authority's budget, the M98 was truncated from 32nd Street to 68th Street. At the same time, southbound M98 service into the George Washington Bus Terminal was discontinued. These two changes were estimated to annually save $800,000.

== Incidents ==
In 2009, buses along the corridor were involved in a total of 268 accidents. The number is attributed to both inexperienced operators and the number of "obstacles" along the route.

On August 27, 2022, a bus operator tried a detour on a City Hall-bound M103 bus when it struck a light pole at the corner of Lex Avenue and 58th Street. The driver and an elderly passenger were both injured.

On July 13, 2023, another operator was driving an M101 Limited bus downtown on Lexington Avenue when it saw a box truck blocking the bus lane at the 85th Street stop. The operator stopped on the main road, but there was another box truck pulling up behind it. The turn around the bus was too tight for the truck driver, who crashed into parts of the bus’s left side. Both drivers and one bus passenger were injured.
