= M42 (New York City bus) =

Bus route in Manhattan, New York

m42
- 42nd Street Crosstown
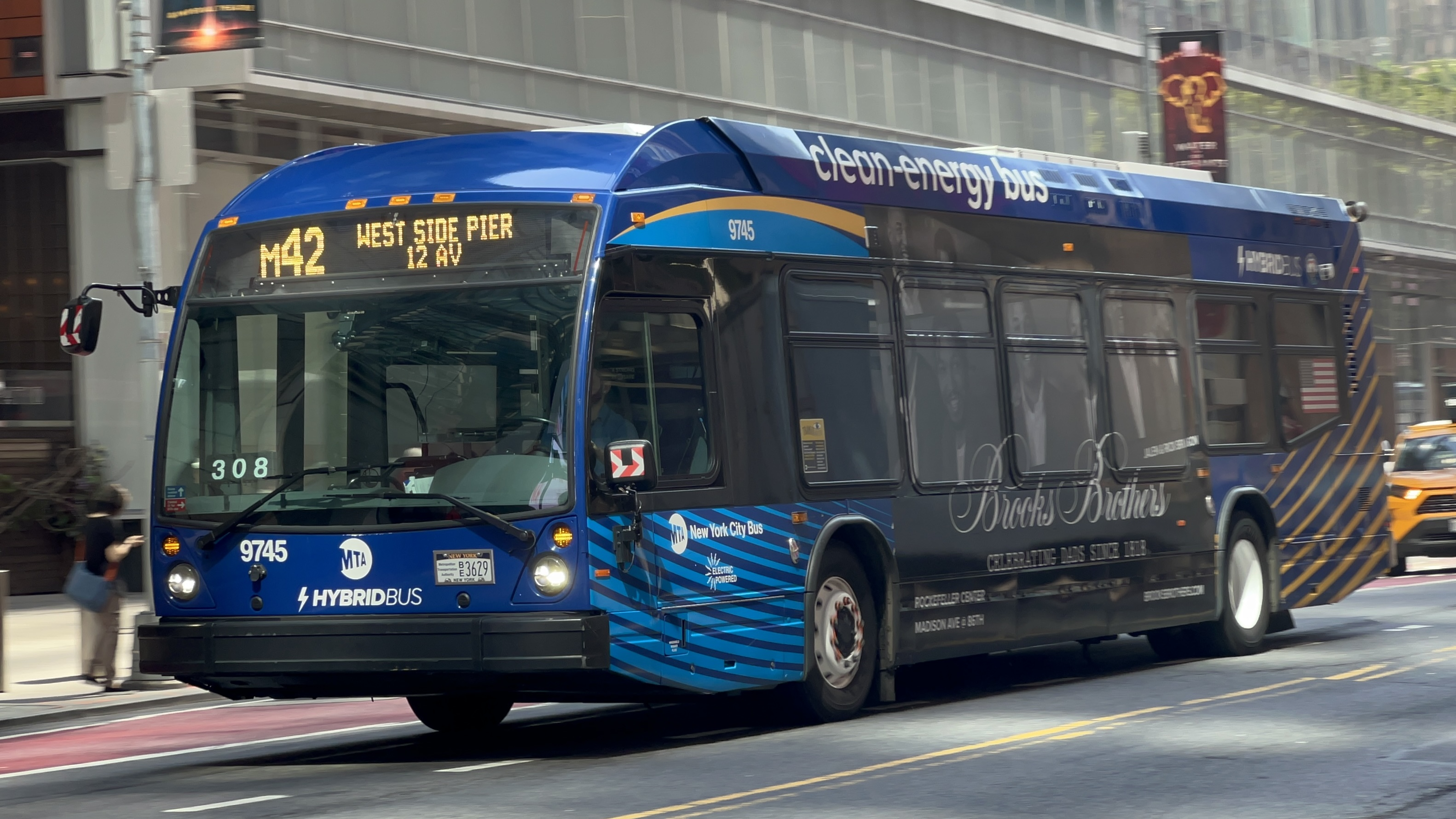
- A 2021 Nova Bus LFS HEV (9745) on the West Side Pier-bound M42 in June 2024.

Overview
- System: MTA Regional Bus Operations
- Operator: Manhattan and Bronx Surface Transit Operating Authority
- Garage: Michael J. Quill Depot
- Vehicle: New Flyer Xcelsior XD40; New Flyer Xcelsior XE40; Nova Bus LFS HEV
- Began service: November 17, 1946; 1901 (streetcar)
- Ended service: November 17, 1946 (streetcar)

Route
- Locale: Manhattan, New York, U.S.
- Communities served: East Midtown, Midtown, West Midtown
- Start: East Side/United Nations - 41st Street & First Avenue
- Via: 42nd Street
- End: West Midtown/Circle Line Sightseeing Cruises – Twelfth Avenue & 42nd Street (Pier 83)
- Length: 2.2 miles (3.5 km)
- Other routes: M50 49th/50th Streets Crosstown

Service
- Operates: All times
- Annual patronage: 2,536,709 (2025)
- Transfers: Yes
- Timetable: M42

The 42nd Street Crosstown Line is a public transit line in Manhattan, running primarily along 42nd Street in Midtown Manhattan. Originally a streetcar line, it is now the M42 bus route, part of MTA Regional Bus Operations and operated by the Manhattan and Bronx Surface Transit Operating Authority under the New York City Transit brand.

== Route description and service ==
=== Streetcar line ===
The 42nd Street Crosstown Line, operated by the Third Avenue Railway, ran along 42nd Street from Pier 83, located at the west end of 42nd Street to First Avenue and 42nd Street. The line ran under the designation X42, with X being used as a prefix for the Third Avenue Railway's crosstown routes.

=== Current bus service ===
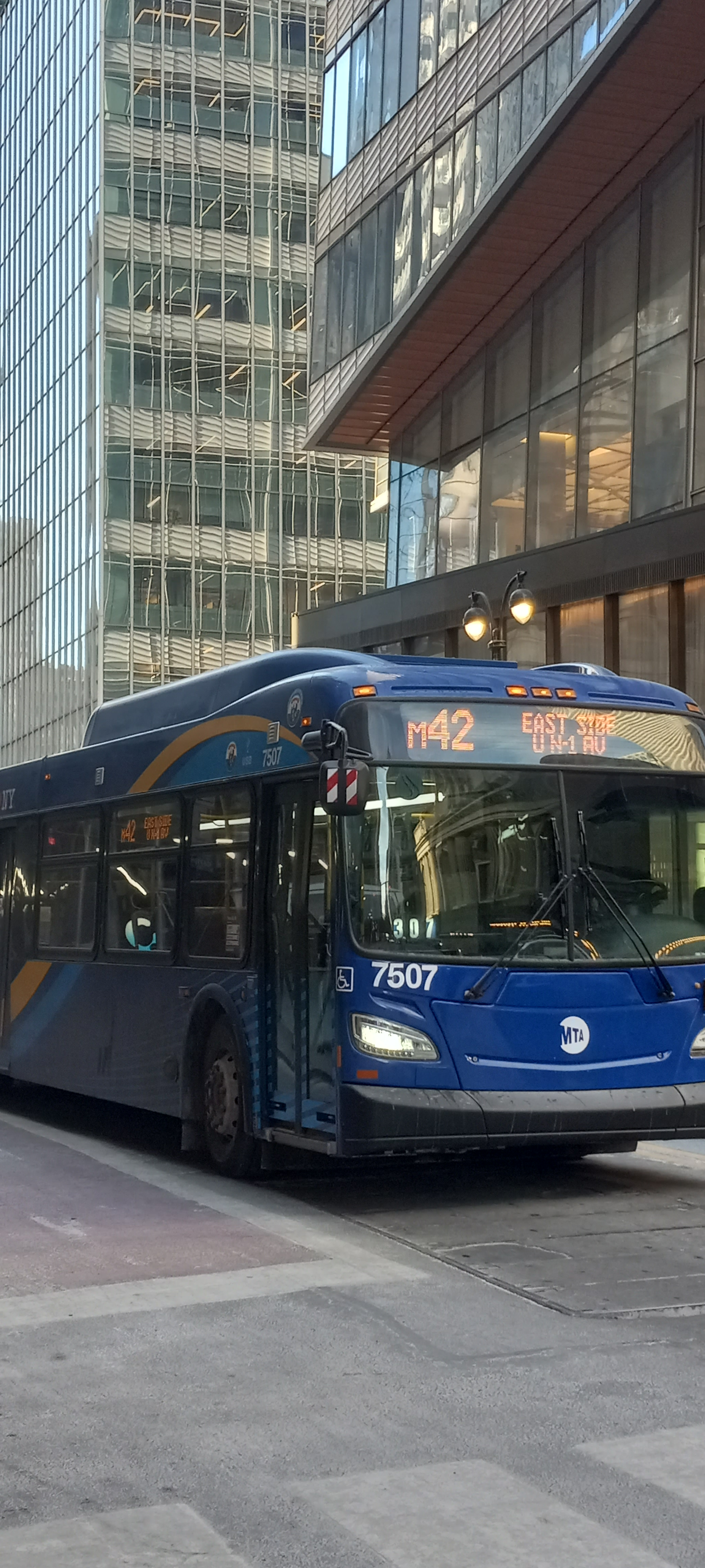
A 2018 XD40 (7507) on the East Side-bound M42

The M42 utilizes the same route as the streetcar, except that it loops around on its eastern end using the FDR Drive, 41st Street and First Avenue. Some eastbound buses may terminate at Grand Central and some westbound buses may terminate at 8th Avenue.

== History ==
Originally chartered in 1878, the Forty-Second Street, Manhattanville & St. Nicholas Railway started service with horsedrawn carriages in 1884, with the Third Avenue Railway acquiring the line in 1896, and alongside it, the streetcar line. The line underwent the process of electrification, and electric operation of street cars began on November 11, 1900.

On November 17, 1946, the streetcar line was replaced by the Surface Transportation Corporation's, the bus-operating subsidiary of the Third Avenue Railway, M106 bus route.

On March 30, 1986, the M106 was re-designated as the M42 and a branch to the Javits Center was added.

On June 27, 2010, due to a budget crisis, service on the Javits Center branch was discontinued. This change was estimated to annually save $200,000.

There was a time when the M42 used buses from Manhattanville Depot for the A.M. rush, but this was stopped between 2017 and 2019.
