= Hudson River Bridge =

Hudson River Bridge may refer to:

- 125th Street Hudson River bridge, a never-built bridge from Manhattan at 125th Street to New Jersey that was proposed in 1954
- Bear Mountain Bridge, built by the Bear Mountain Hudson River Bridge Company
- George Washington Bridge (opened 1931), informally known as the Hudson River Bridge during its construction
- Hudson River Bridge (1866-1901), a railroad bridge connecting Albany and Rensselaer, New York, replaced by the Livingston Avenue Bridge

== See also ==
- List of crossings of the Hudson River
