= Cross-Manhattan Expressway =

Cross-Manhattan Expressway may refer to:

- Trans-Manhattan Expressway, part of I-95
- The unbuilt Lower Manhattan Expressway
- The unbuilt Mid-Manhattan Expressway
- The unbuilt Cross Harlem Expressway
