= 125th Street (Manhattan) =

West-east street in Manhattan, New York

Coordinates: 40.8108°N 73.9526°W

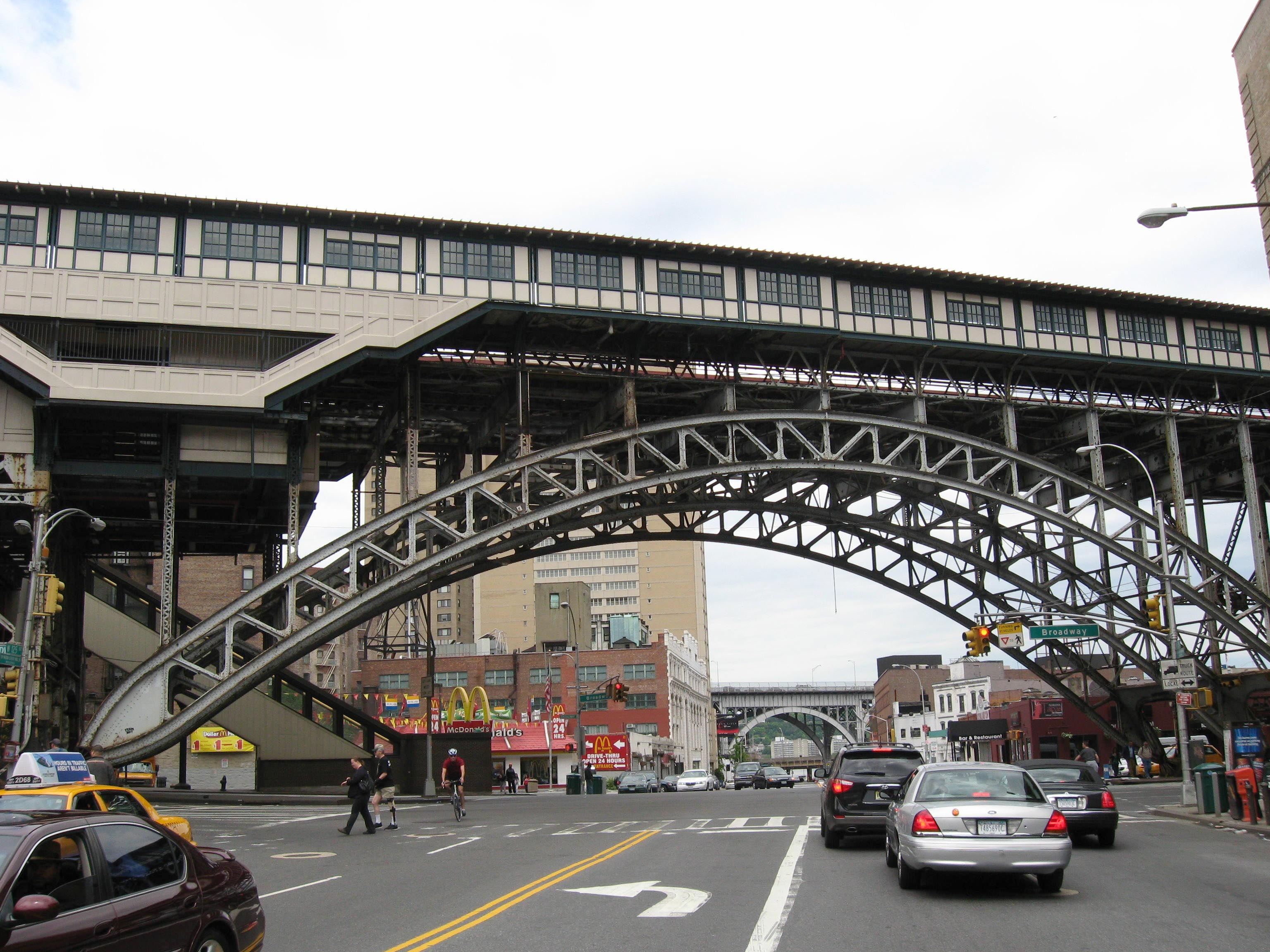
West 125th Street near Broadway, looking west toward the Hudson River. The 125th Street subway station of the IRT Broadway – Seventh Avenue Line can be seen overhead.

125th Street, co-named Martin Luther King Jr. Boulevard is a two-way street that runs east–west in the New York City borough of Manhattan, from First Avenue on the east to Marginal Street, a service road for the Henry Hudson Parkway along the Hudson River in the west. It is often considered to be the "Main Street" of Harlem.

Notable buildings along 125th Street include the Apollo Theater, the Adam Clayton Powell Jr. State Office Building, the Hotel Theresa, the Studio Museum in Harlem, the Mount Morris Bank Building, Harlem Commonwealth Council, the Harlem Children's Zone, the Church of St. Joseph of the Holy Family, and the former West End Theatre, now home to the La Gree Baptist Church.

== History ==
The street was designated by the Commissioners' Plan of 1811 that established the Manhattan street grid as one of 15 east–west streets that would be 100 feet (30 m) in width (while other streets were designated as 60 feet (18 m) in width).

== Neighborhoods ==
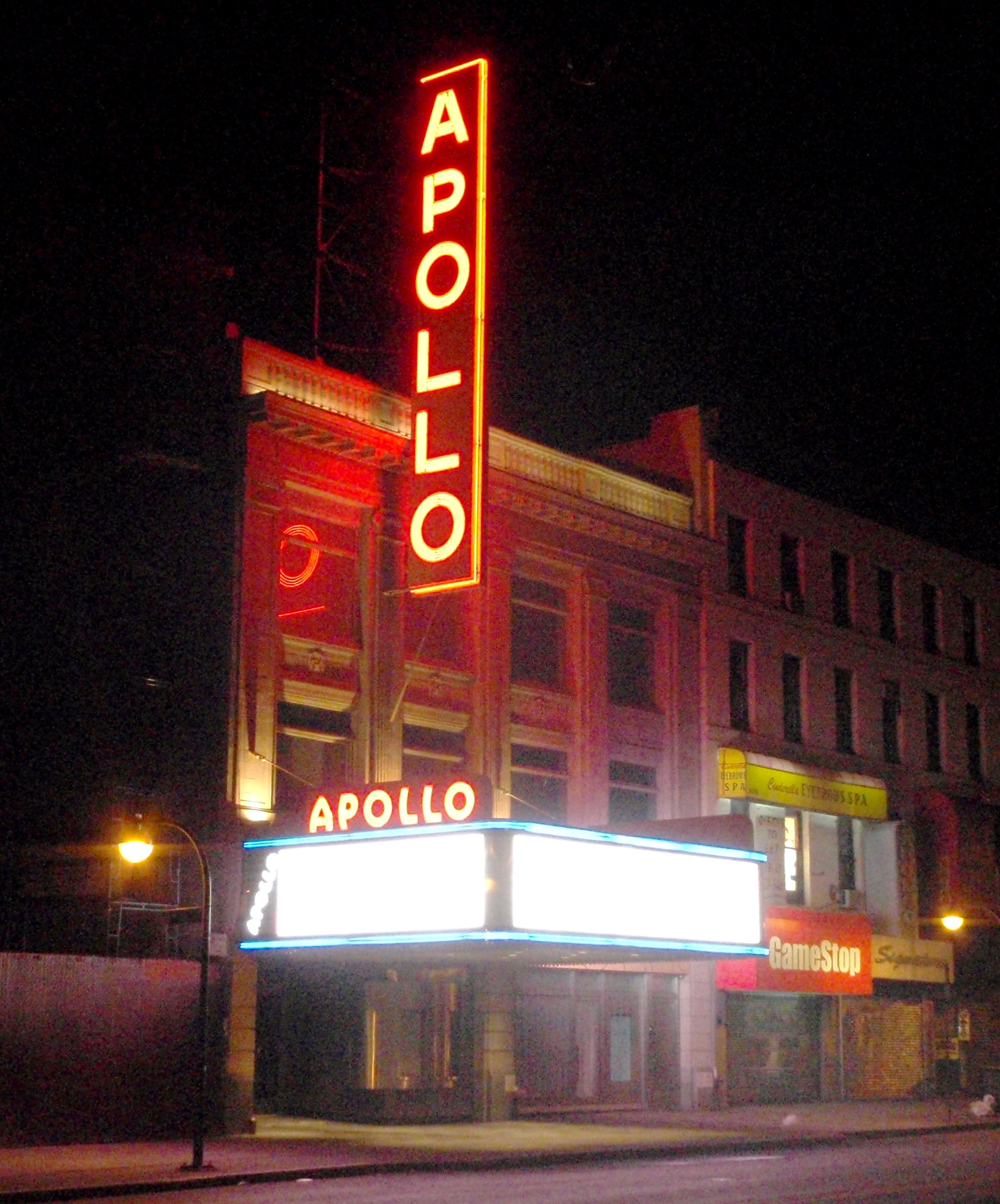
The world-famous Apollo Theater

The western part of the street runs diagonally between the neighborhoods of Manhattanville and Morningside Heights from the northwest from the West Harlem Piers and an interchange with the Henry Hudson Parkway at 130th Street. East of Morningside Avenue it runs east–west through central Harlem to Second Avenue, where a ramp connects it to the Robert F. Kennedy (Triborough) Bridge. However, 125th Street continues to First Avenue, where it connects to the southbound FDR Drive and the Willis Avenue Bridge.

West of Convent Avenue, 125th Street was rerouted onto what was, prior to 1920, called Manhattan Street. What remains of the original alignment of 125th Street was renamed La Salle Street at that time. The remaining blocks run between Amsterdam Avenue and Claremont Avenue. The New York Times lamented the name changes, noting that the new names had "somewhat doubtful nomenclature", and that the City's "Aldermen like French names" but gave no rationale for the moves otherwise. A block of the original 125th Street in this area was de-mapped to make the super-blocks where the Grant Houses projects now exist.

A proposal to convert the street into a Trans-Harlem Expressway died when funds were diverted from the proposed 125th Street Hudson River bridge at the street's western end.

Beginning in the late 1990s, many sections of 125th Street have been gentrified and developed with such stores as MAC Cosmetics, Old Navy, H&M, CVS/pharmacy, and Magic Johnson Theaters. In collaboration with the community, the city has developed a plan for the 125th Street corridor focusing on reinforcing and building upon its strengths as an arts and cultural corridor.

== Fault line ==
A rift in the crust runs along underneath this street from the East River to New Jersey and is known as the 125th Street Fault or the Manhattanville Fault. It is suspected to have caused a magnitude-5.2 earthquake in 1737, two smaller ones in 1981, and a 2.4 magnitude quake in 2001. The fault line skims across the top of Central Park and runs to Roosevelt Island to the southeast. It creates a fault valley deep enough to require the IRT Broadway–Seventh Avenue Line (1 train) to use a trestle between 122nd and 135th Streets, even though the line goes underground at either end and remains at the same elevation above sea level throughout. Riverside Drive also crosses over the fault valley on a high viaduct.

== Public transportation ==
The following New York City Subway stations are located at 125th Street (west to east):

- 125th Street at Broadway, served by the 1 train
- 125th Street at St. Nicholas Avenue, served by the A, B, C, and D trains
- 125th Street at Lenox Avenue, served by the 2 and 3 trains
- 125th Street at Lexington Avenue, served by the 4, 5, 6, and <6> trains

The following NYC Bus lines serve 125th Street:

- The M125 is the corridor's main server, running between Saint Clair Place and either First Avenue (eastbound) or Second Avenue (westbound), with the latter continuing out of service to 12th Avenue and looping around.
- The M60 SBS makes specific stops east of Amsterdam Avenue.
- Additional local service is provided by the M101 between Amsterdam and Lexington (eastbound) or Third Avenues (westbound).
- The M104 runs between Broadway and Amsterdam (eastbound) or Morningside Avenues (westbound).
- The M100 runs between Amsterdam and Saint Nicholas Avenues, where it terminates.

And these bus routes cross the street:

- M5 at Riverside Drive
- M4 at Broadway
- M3 at St. Nicholas Avenue
- M10 at Frederick Douglass Boulevard
- M2 at Adam Clayton Powell Jr. Boulevard (7th Avenue)
- M7 and M102 at Lenox Avenue
- M1 at Madison Avenue (northbound) and Fifth Avenue (southbound)
- M98 at Park Avenue (southbound) and Third Avenue (northbound)
- M103 at Lexington Avenue (southbound) and Third Avenue (northbound)
- M35 at Lexington Avenue (eastbound)
- M15 and M15 SBS at Second Avenue (southbound) and First Avenue (northbound)

Metro-North Railroad's Harlem–125th Street station is located at the street's intersection with Park Avenue.

The planned second phase of the Second Avenue Subway, continuing north from the 116th Street station, will turn westward onto 125th Street, terminating at a station at Lexington Avenue. The new station would connect to the Metro-North and preexisting Lexington Avenue subway stations there.

== Gallery ==
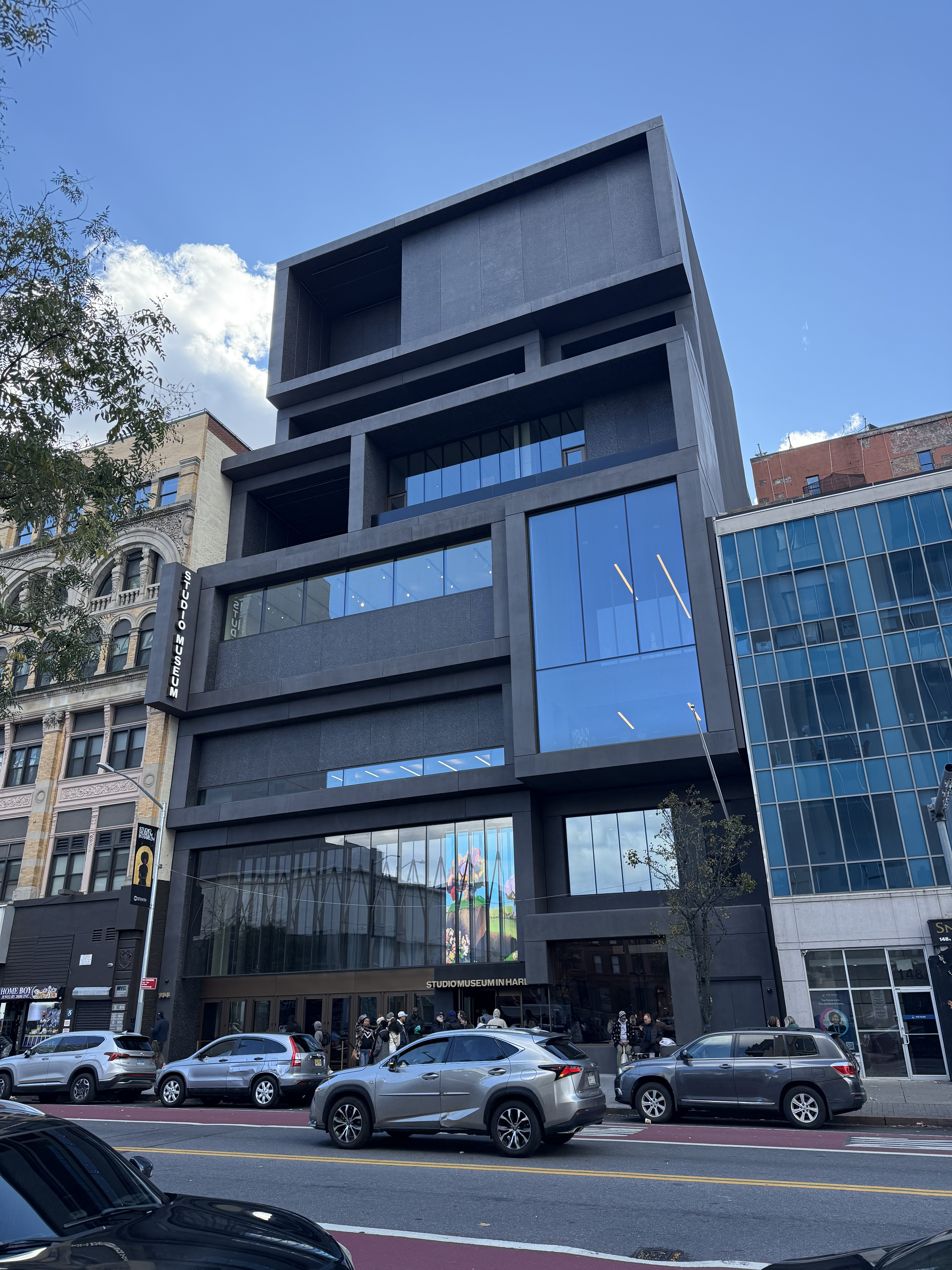
The Studio Museum in Harlem, 2025
(144 West 125th St.)

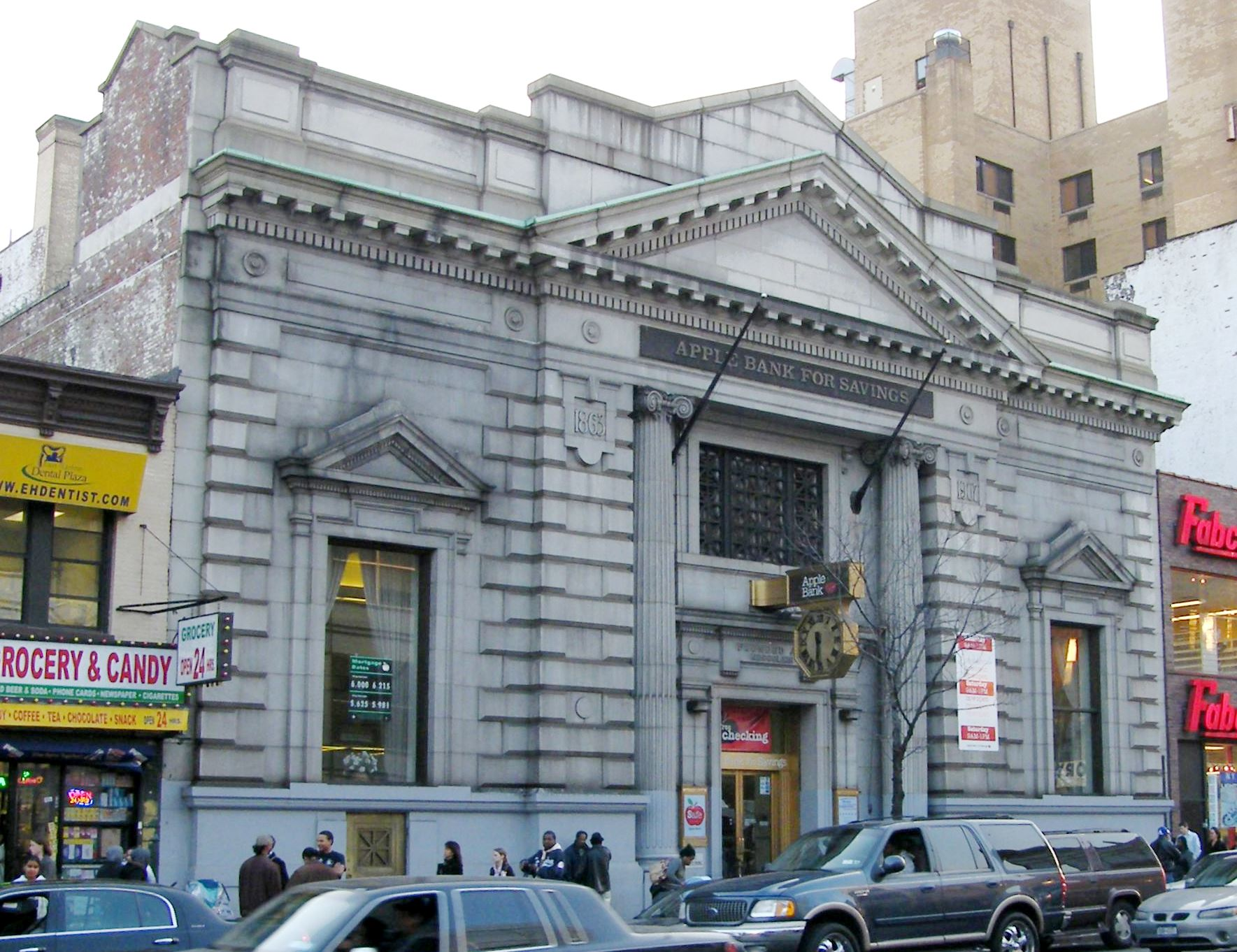
Harlem Savings Bank, listed on the
National Register of Historic Places (NRHP)
(123 East 125th St.)

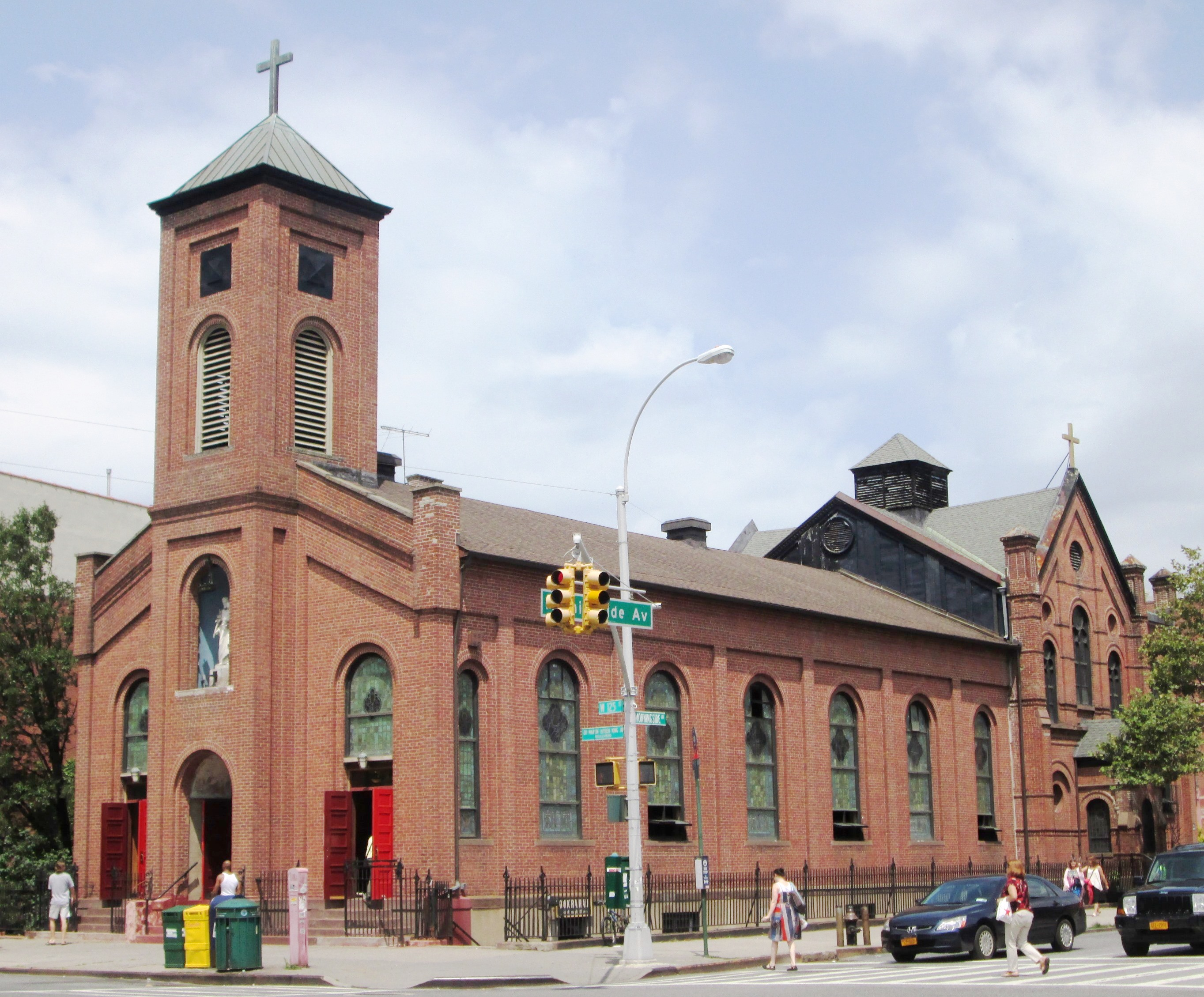
St. Joseph of the Holy Family Church
the oldest existing church in Harlem and above 44th Street
(401 West 125th St.)

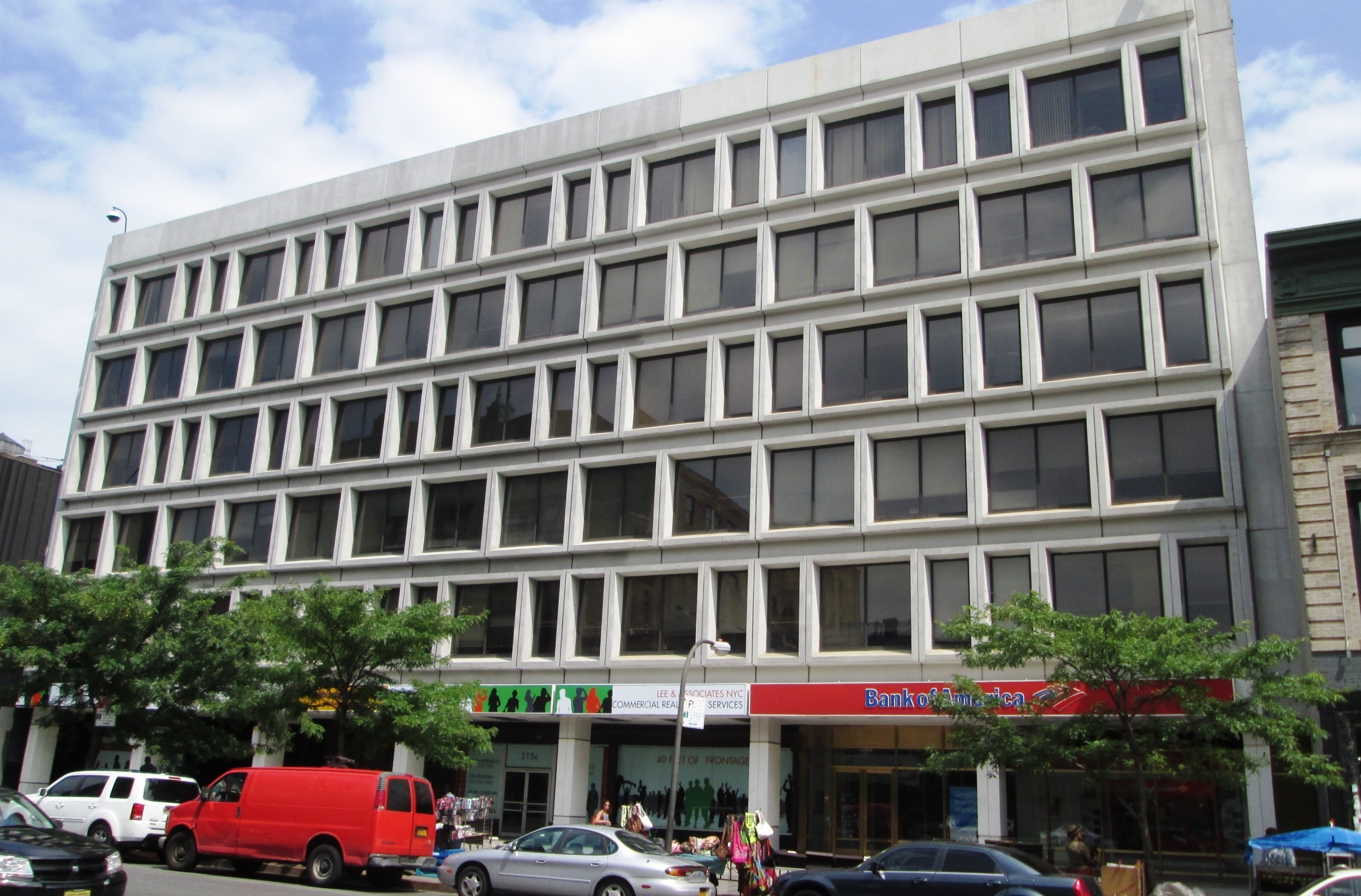
Sydenham Hospital Clinic
formerly the Commonwealth Building
(215 West 125th St.)
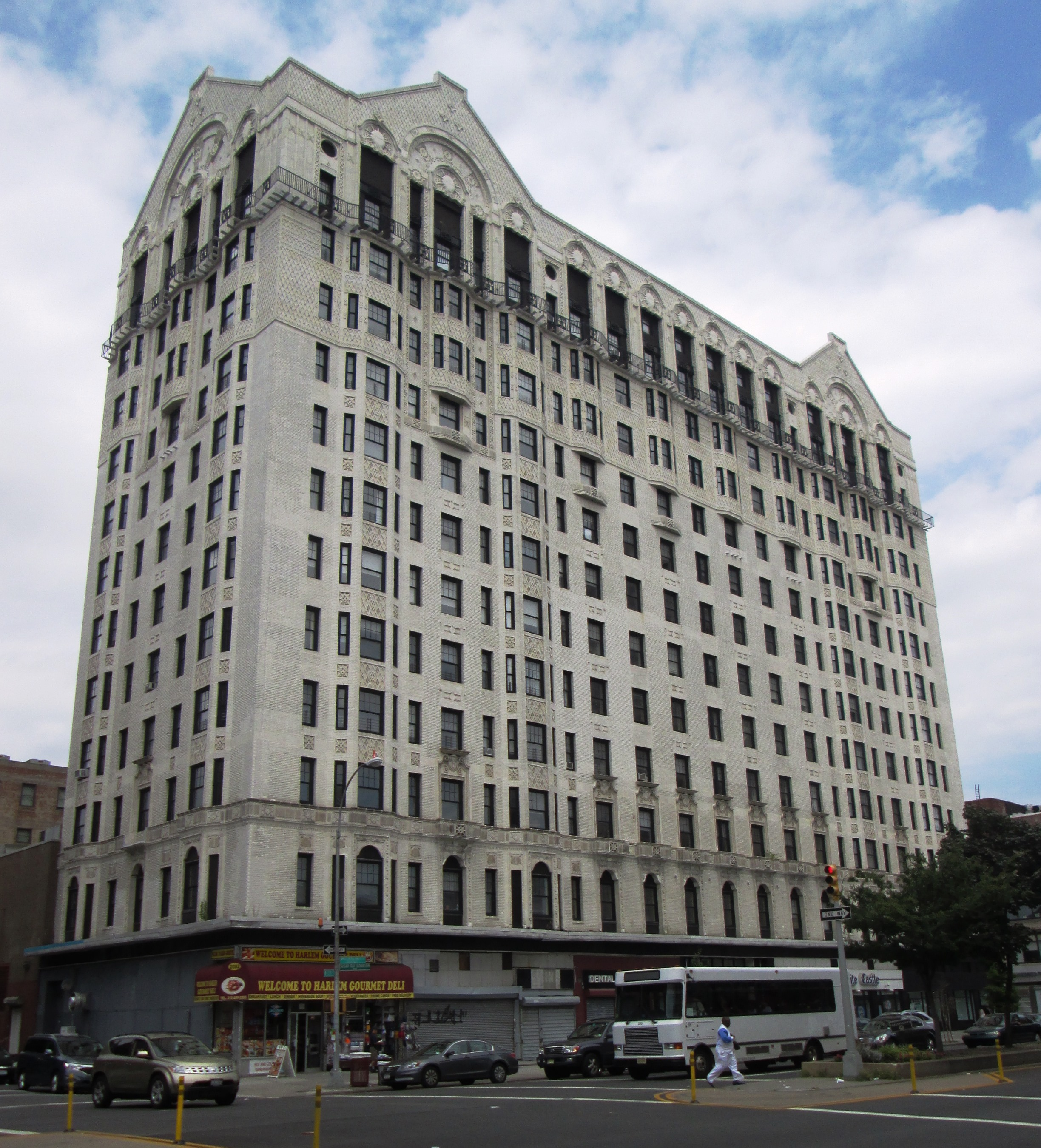
Hotel Theresa, now Theresa Towers,
a NYC landmark and on the NRHP
(West 125th St. and Adam Clayton Powell Jr. Blvd.)

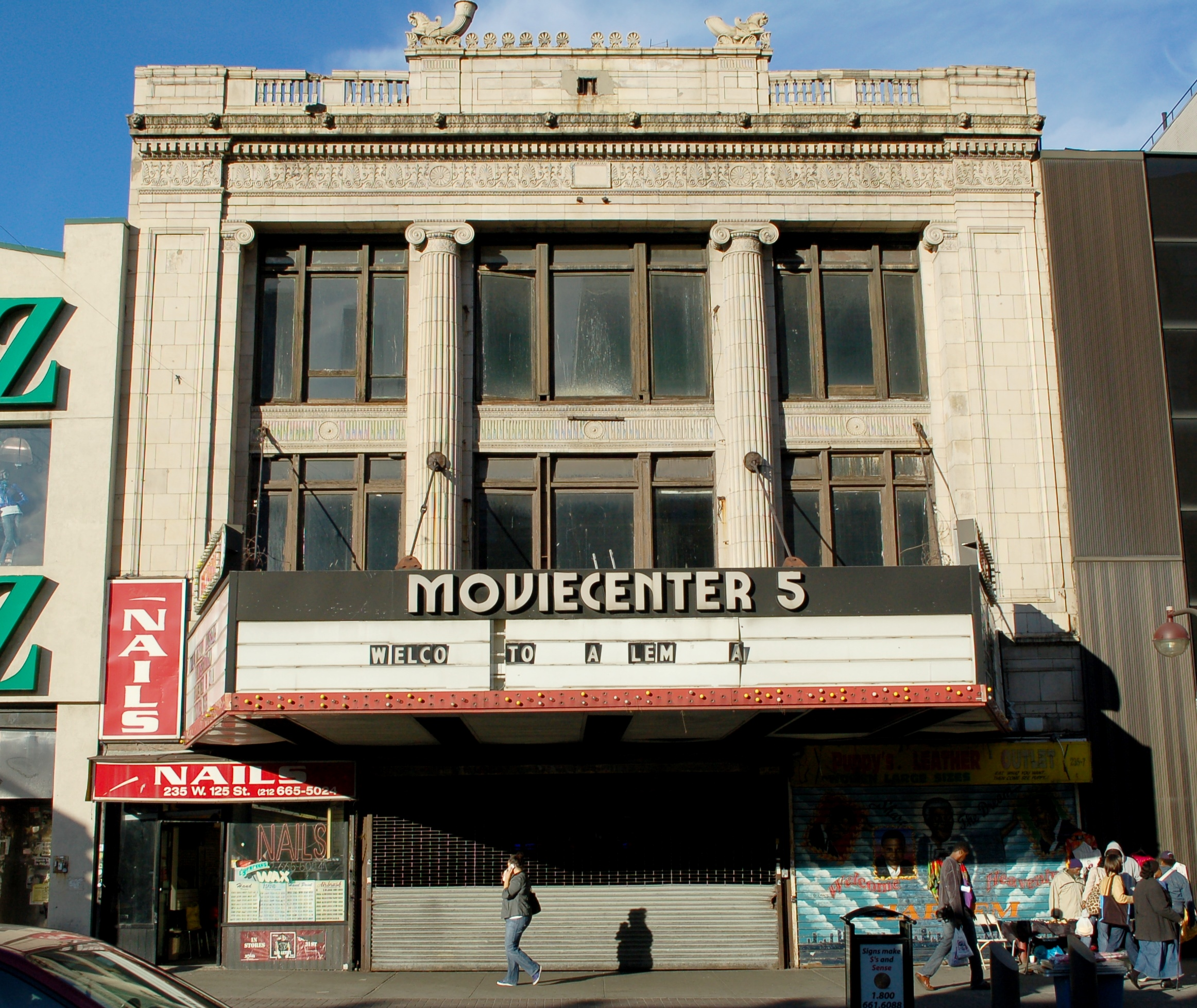
Victoria Theater, now being renovated into a mixed-use building
(237 West 125th St)

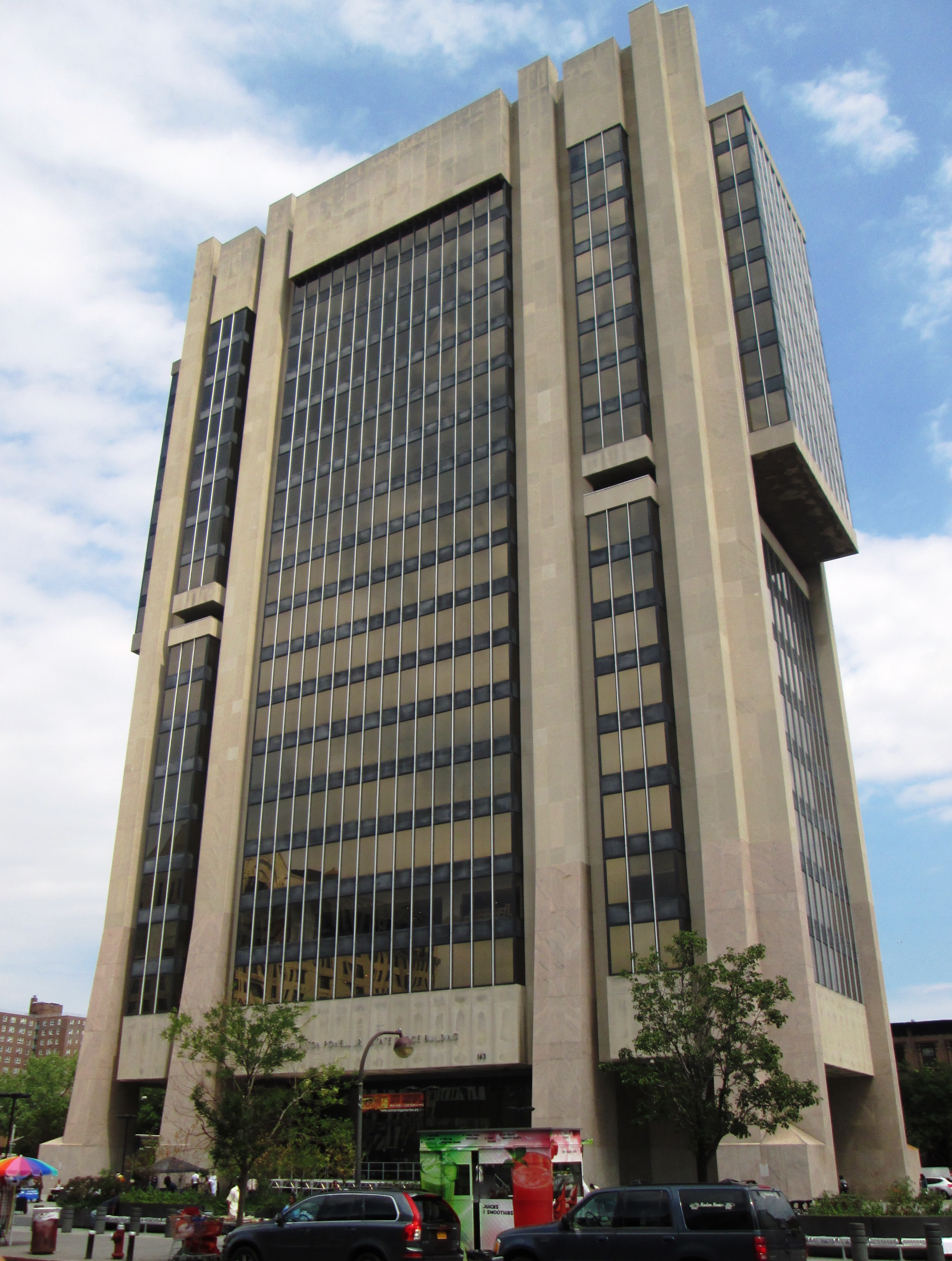
Adam Clayton Powell Jr. State Office Building
(163 West 125th Street)

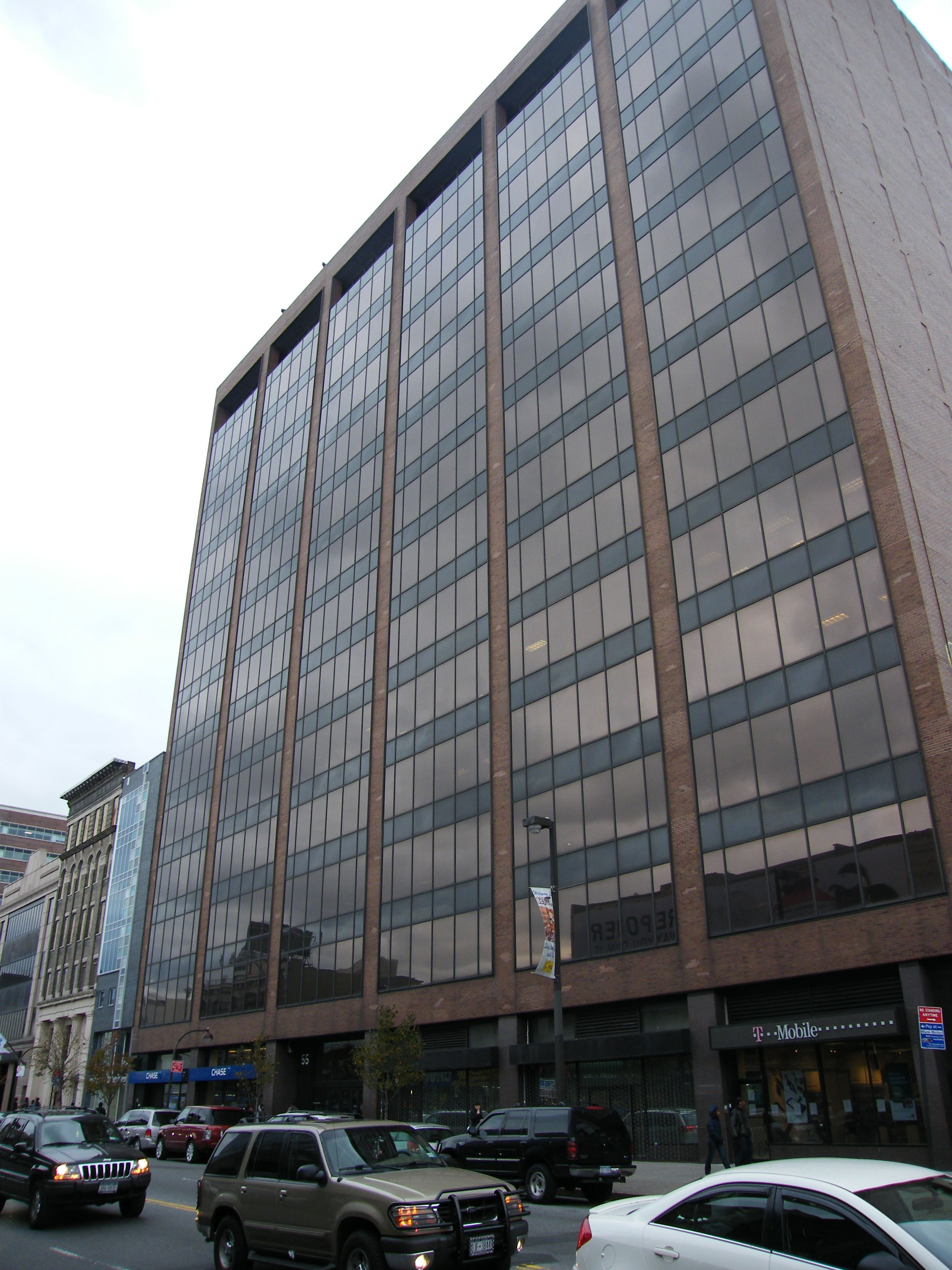
55 West 125th Street
where Bill Clinton has his office

== Notable occupants ==
- As of 2011, former president Bill Clinton maintains an office on 125th Street.

== In popular culture ==
- The intersection of 125th and Lexington Avenue is the location where Lou Reed buys heroin on the Velvet Underground's "I'm Waiting for the Man" from their seminal 1967 debut album, The Velvet Underground & Nico.
- Small Talk at 125th and Lenox (1970) is an album by Gil Scott-Heron.
- In The Wiz (1978), Aunt Em says to Dorothy, "Girl, do you know that you're 24 years old, and you've never been south of 125th Street? Well, you haven't!"
