= St. Joseph of the Holy Family Church (New York City) =

Church in Manhattan, New York

Coordinates: 40°48′42″N 73°57′15″W

Church of St. Joseph of the Holy Family
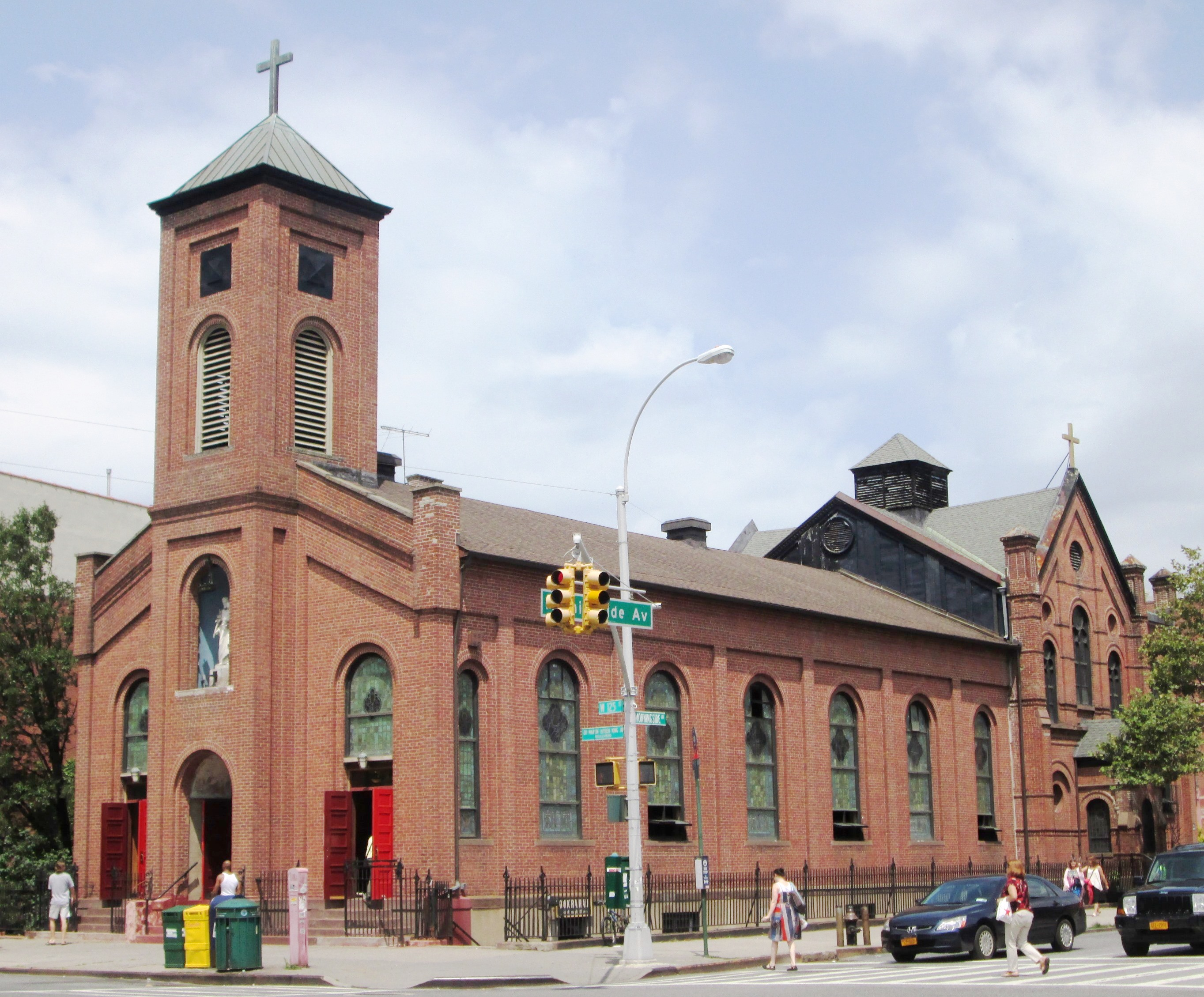
- (2013)
- Interactive map of the Church of St. Joseph of the Holy Family area

General information
- Architectural style: Romanesque Revival
- Location: New York City, United States of America
- Construction started: 1859
- Completed: 1860; 1871 (enlarged); 1889 (altered)
- Client: Roman Catholic Archdiocese of New York

Technical details
- Structural system: Red brick masonry

Design and construction
- Architect: Herter Brothers (1889 alteration)

Website
- St. Joseph of the Holy Family, Manhattan (Harlem)

The Church of St. Joseph of the Holy Family is a Black Catholic parish in the Archdiocese of New York, located at 401 West 125th Street at Morningside Avenue in the Harlem neighborhood of Manhattan, New York City. It is the oldest existing church in Harlem and above 44th Street in Manhattan. On June 28, 2016, it was designated a New York City Landmark.

== Parish ==
The parish was established in 1859 or 1860 for German Catholics. The first priest to minister to the German-speaking Catholic residents of Manhattanville, was Fr D. F. Hartmann, assigned by the archdiocese in 1859. Services were initially held in the chapel on the grounds of the Academy of the Sacred Heart.

Although the building has remained in one location, street name changes in Harlem have affected the address. The address listed in 1892 was at 125th Street and the corner of 9th Avenue.

The parish, which has since become associated with the African-American community sponsors a weekly food pantry and clothing bank for the community.

== Architecture ==
Built before the American Civil War, the Romanesque Revival red brick church was built and dedicated in 1860. However, the city Landmarks Preservation Commission interprets the church as an example of the Rundbogenstil design. "St. Joseph’s was not a revival of Romanesque architecture but a new design based on abstracted and simplified interpretation of the Romanesque." Its German style reflects the heritage of the original parishioners, and is also in keeping with the rural nature of the area at the time of construction. Constructed of brick, it has a single bell tower and rounded arched windows. It was enlarged in 1871 and altered in 1889 by the Herter Brothers. As part of the alteration, the window over the entrance became a niche for a statue of St. Joseph holding the infant.

== School ==
The church had a school and convent affiliated with it, which were located in the former Manhattanville Presbyterian Church, a Greek Revival structure directly behind the church. The parish school was among 27 in the Archdiocese of New York closed by Archbishop Dolan on January 11, 2011.
