= Robert F. Kennedy Bridge =

Bridge complex in New York City

Robert F. Kennedy Bridge (Triborough Bridge)
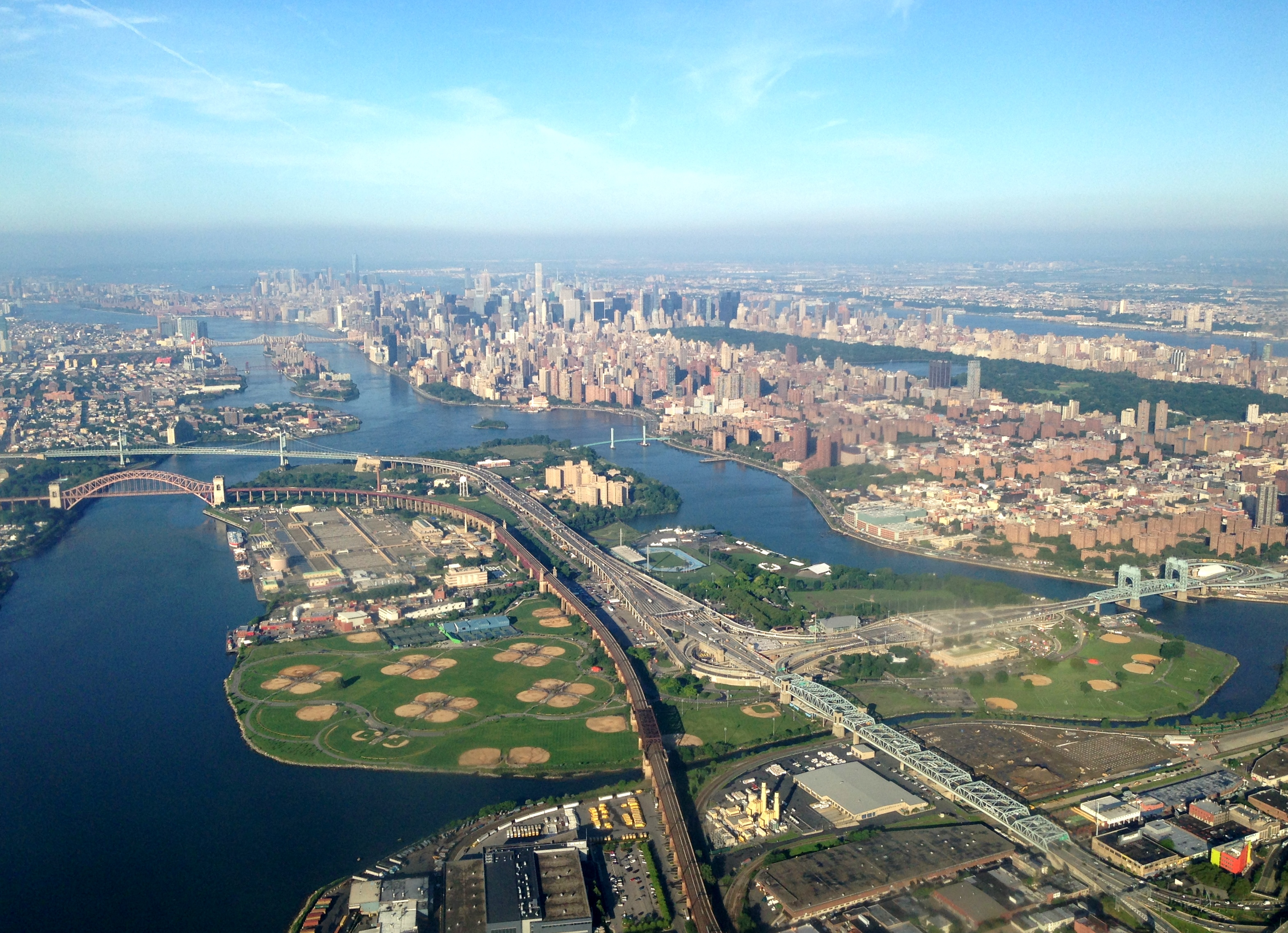
- Randalls and Wards Islands looking south, showing the RFK Bridge road complex, with the Hell Gate railroad bridge to the northeast (lower left)
- Coordinates: 40°46′50″N 73°55′39″W
- Carries: 8 lanes of I-278 (Bronx and Queens spans); 6 lanes of NY 900G (Manhattan span)
- Crosses: East River, Harlem River and Bronx Kill
- Locale: New York City, United States
- Official name: Robert F. Kennedy Bridge
- Other name(s): Triborough Bridge, Triboro Bridge, RFK Bridge
- Named for: Robert F. Kennedy
- Maintained by: MTA Bridges and Tunnels

Characteristics
- Design: Suspension bridge, lift bridge, truss bridge
- Total length: 2,780 ft (850 m) (Queens span); 770 ft (230 m) (Manhattan span); 1,600 ft (490 m) (Bronx span)
- Width: 98 ft (30 m) (Queens span)
- Longest span: 1,380 ft (420 m) (Queens span); 310 ft (94 m) (Manhattan span); 383 ft (117 m) (Bronx span)
- Clearance above: 14 ft 6 in (4.42 m) (Queens/Bronx spans); 13 ft 10 in (4.22 m) (Manhattan span)
- Clearance below: 143 ft (44 m) (Queens span); 135 ft (41 m) (Manhattan span when raised); 55 ft (17 m) (Bronx span)

History
- Construction cost: $60,300,000
- Opened: July 11, 1936; 90 years ago

Statistics
- Daily traffic: 95,552 (Queens–Manhattan and Bronx–Manhattan, 2016); 83,053 (Queens–Bronx, 2016)
- Toll: As of August 6, 2023, $11.19 (Tolls By Mail and non-New York E-ZPass); $6.94 (New York E-ZPass); $9.11 (Mid-Tier NYCSC E-Z Pass)

Location
- Interactive map of Robert F. Kennedy Bridge (Triborough Bridge)

The Robert F. Kennedy Bridge (RFK Bridge; or more commonly referred to by locals by its name prior to 2008, the Triborough Bridge, or Triboro) is a complex of bridges and elevated expressway viaducts in New York City. The bridges link the boroughs of Manhattan, Queens, and the Bronx. The viaducts cross Randalls and Wards Islands, previously two islands and now joined by landfill.

The RFK Bridge, a toll bridge, carries Interstate 278 (I-278) as well as the unsigned highway New York State Route 900G. It connects with the FDR Drive and the Harlem River Drive in Manhattan, the Bruckner Expressway (I-278) and the Major Deegan Expressway (Interstate 87) in the Bronx, and the Grand Central Parkway (I-278) and Astoria Boulevard in Queens. The three primary bridges of the RFK Bridge complex are:

- The vertical-lift bridge over the Harlem River, the largest in the world, connecting Manhattan Island to Randalls Island (all within Manhattan)
- The truss bridge over Bronx Kill, connecting Randalls Island to the Bronx
- The suspension bridge over Hell Gate (a strait of the East River), connecting Wards Island to Astoria in Queens

These three bridges are connected by an elevated highway viaduct across Randalls and Wards Islands and 14 miles (23 km) of support roads. The viaduct includes a smaller span across the former site of Little Hell Gate, which separated Randalls and Wards Islands. Also part of the complex is a grade-separated T-interchange on Randalls Island, which sorted out traffic in a way that ensured that drivers paid a toll at only one bank of tollbooths. The tollbooths have since been removed, and all tolls are collected electronically at the approaches to each bridge.

The bridge complex was designed by Allston Dana with the collaboration of Othmar Ammann and architect Aymar Embury II, and has been called "not a bridge so much as a traffic machine, the largest ever built". The American Society of Civil Engineers designated the Triborough Bridge Project as a National Historic Civil Engineering Landmark in 1986. The bridge, named for former New York senator Robert F. Kennedy, is owned and operated by MTA Bridges and Tunnels (formally the Triborough Bridge and Tunnel Authority, or TBTA), an affiliate of the Metropolitan Transportation Authority.

== Description ==
The RFK Bridge is made of four segments. The three primary spans traverse the East River to Queens; the Harlem River to Manhattan; and Bronx Kill to the Bronx, while the fourth is a T-shaped approach viaduct that leads to an interchange plaza between the three primary spans on Randalls Island. The Queens arm of the viaduct formerly crossed Little Hell Gate, a creek located between Randalls Island to the north and Wards Island to the south. Excluding elevated ramps, the segments are a total of 17,710 feet (5,400 m) long, with a 13,560-foot-long (4,130 m) span between the Bronx and Queens, and a 4,150-foot-long (1,260 m) span between Manhattan and the interchange plaza. In total, the bridge contains 17.5 miles (28.2 km) of roadway, including elevated ramps.

The bridge was primarily designed by chief engineer Allston Dana and architect Aymar Embury II. Wharton Green served as the Public Works Administration (PWA)'s resident engineer for the project.

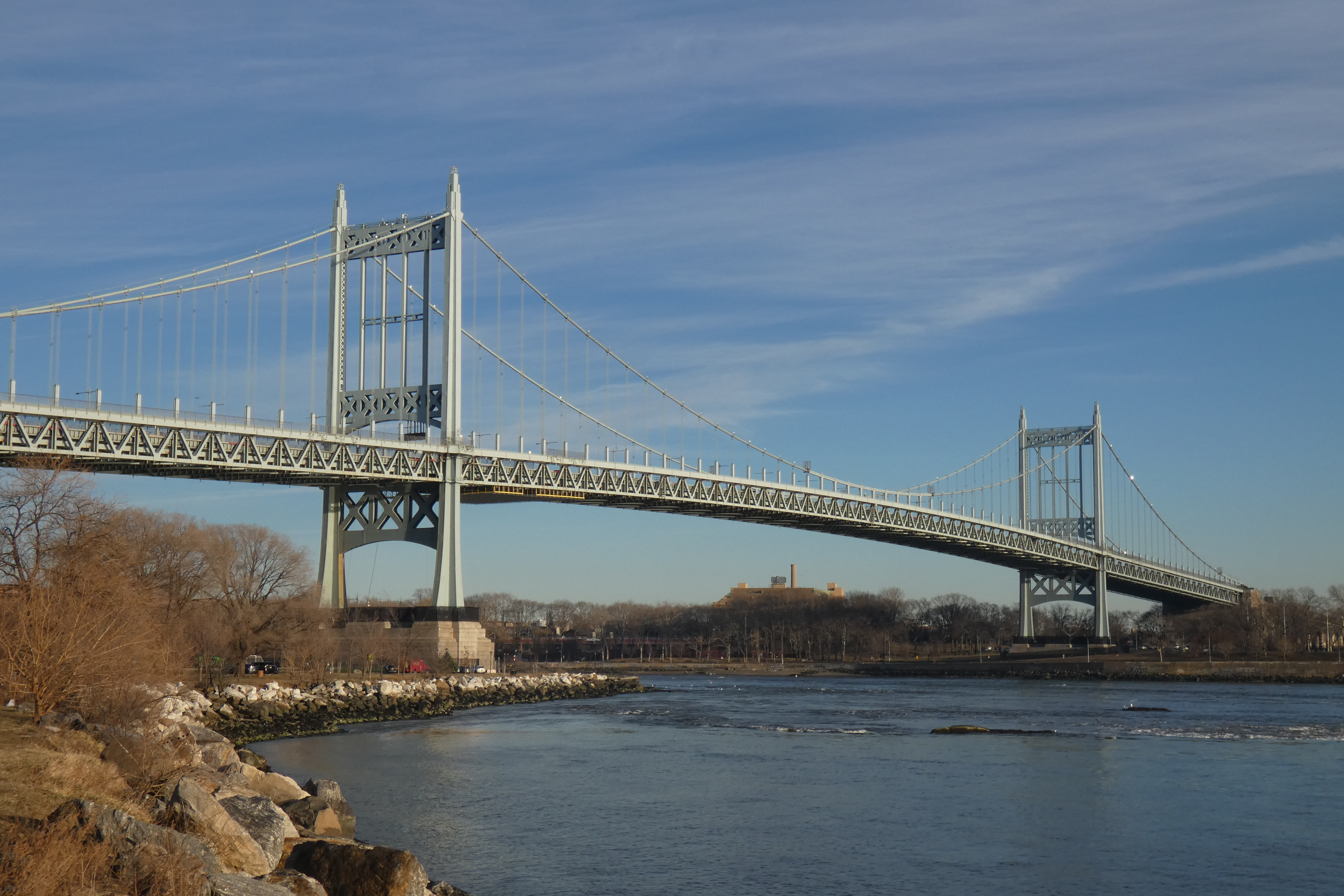
The East River suspension bridge, pictured in 2022

=== East River suspension bridge (I-278) ===
The East River span, a suspension bridge across the Hell Gate of the East River, connects Queens with Wards Island. It carries eight lanes of Interstate 278, four in each direction, as well as a sidewalk on the northeastern side. The span connects to Grand Central Parkway, and indirectly to the Brooklyn–Queens Expressway (I-278), in Astoria, Queens. Originally it connected to the intersection of 25th Avenue and 31st Street; the former was later renamed Hoyt Avenue. The suspension span was designed by chief engineer Othmar Ammann. The span was originally designed to be double-decked, with eight lanes on each deck. When the construction of the Triborough Bridge was paused in 1932 due to lack of funding, the suspension span was downsized to a single deck. There are Warren trusses on each side of the span, which stiffen the deck.

The center span between the two suspension towers is 1,380 feet (421 m) long, and the side spans between the suspension towers and the anchorages are each 700 feet (213 m) long. The total length of the bridge is 2,780 feet (847 m), and the deck is 98 feet (30 m) wide. The columns under the Wards Island approach roadway were originally placed atop 400,000 steel ball bearings, allowing the roadway to move sideways by up to 13.25 inches (337 mm) in either direction.

At mean high water, the towers are 315 feet (96 m) tall, and there is 143 feet (44 m) of clearance under the middle of the main span. The suspension towers were originally designed by Arthur I. Perry. Each tower was supposed to have two ornate arches at the top, similar to the Brooklyn Bridge, and was to have been supported by four legs: two on the outside and two in the center. A 1932 article described that each tower would be made of 5,000 tons of material, including 3,680 tons of steel. The final design of the suspension towers, by Ammann, consists of comparatively simple cross bracing supported by two legs. The tops of each tower contain cast iron saddles in the Art Deco style, over which the bridge's main cables run. These are topped by 30-foot (9.1 m) decorative lanterns with red aircraft warning lights.

The span is supported by two main cables, which suspend the deck and are held up by the suspension towers. Each cable is 20 inches (51 cm) in diameter and contains 10,800 miles (17,400 km) of individual wires. Each main cable is composed of 37 strands of 248 wires, for a total of 9,176 wires in each cable. The wires are fastened together by "strand shoes", placed at regular intervals. At the Wards Island and Astoria ends of the suspension span, there are two anchorages that hold the main cables. The anchorages contain a combined 133,500 tons of concrete. There are also bents atop each anchorage, which conceal the ends of each main cable.

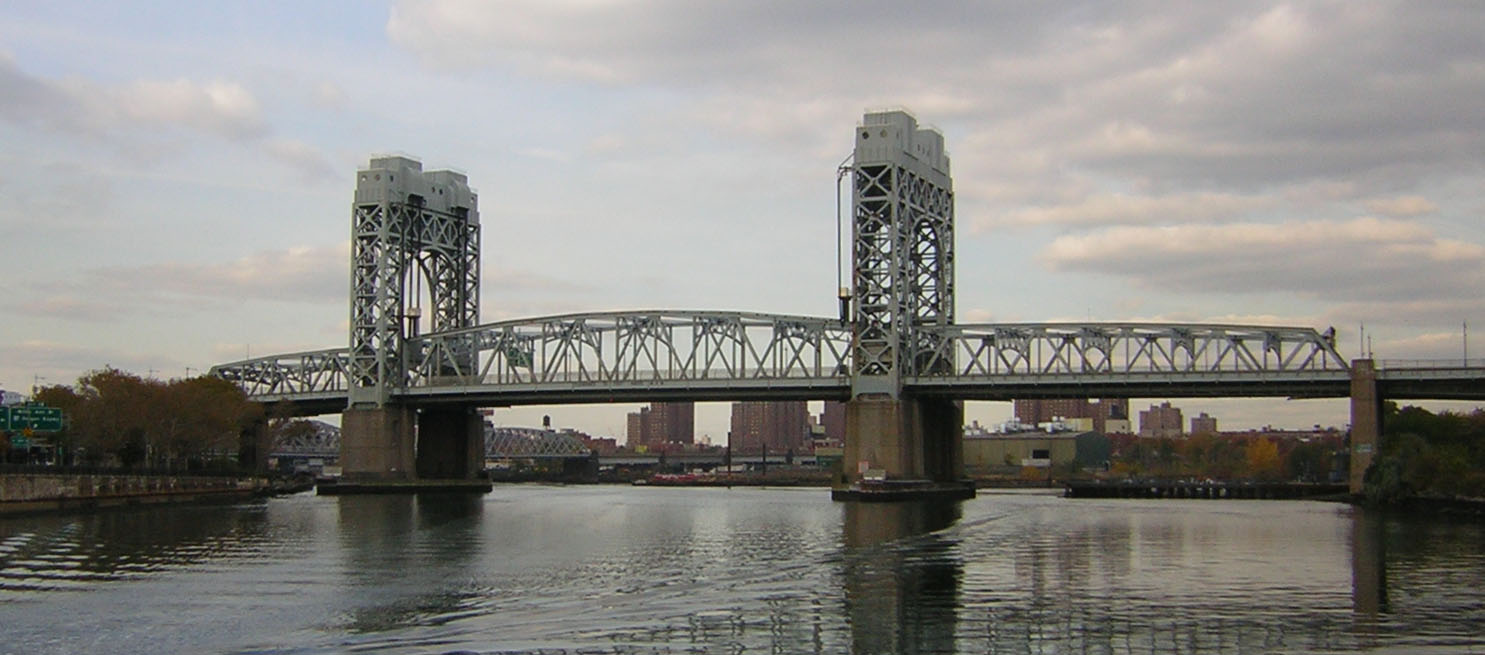
The Harlem River lift bridge in 2007

=== Harlem River lift bridge (NY 900G) ===
New York State Route 900G
- Location: Manhattan
- Length: 0.66 mi (1,060 m)

The Harlem River span is a lift bridge that connects Manhattan with Randalls Island, designed by chief engineer Allston Dana. It carries six lanes of New York State Route 900G (NY 900G), an unsigned reference route, as well as two sidewalks, one on each side. The span connects to FDR Drive and Harlem River Drive, as well as the intersection of Second Avenue and East 125th Street, in East Harlem, Manhattan. At the time of its completion, the Harlem River lift bridge had the largest deck of any lift bridge in the world, with a surface area of 20,000 square feet (1,900 m^{2}). To lighten the deck, it was made of asphalt paved onto steel girders, rather than of concrete.

The movable span is 310 feet (94 m) long and 92 feet (28 m) wide. The side spans between the movable span and the approach viaducts are each 195 feet (59 m) long. The total length of the bridge is 700 feet (213 m). The towers are 210 feet (64 m) above mean high water. Each of the lift towers is supported by two clusters of four columns, which supports the bridge deck. A curved truss at the top of each pair of column clusters forms an arch directly underneath the deck.

The lift span is 55 feet (17 m) above mean high water in the "closed" position, but can be raised to 135 feet (41 m). The movable section is suspended by a total of 96 wire ropes, which are wrapped around pulleys with 15-foot (4.6 m) diameters. These pulleys, in turn, are powered by four motors that can operate at 200 horsepower (149 kW).

==== Exit list ====
NY 900G is officially maintained as a north–south route, despite its largely east-west progression. The entire route is in the New York City borough of Manhattan. All exits are unnumbered.

Location	mi	km	Destinations	Notes
Randall's Island	0.0	0.0	I-278 to I-87 north – Bronx, Queens, Airports	Southern terminus; exit 46 on I-278
Randall's Island	0.1	0.16	Randalls Island, Icahn Stadium	Southbound exit and northbound entrance; access via Central Road
Harlem River	0.2– 0.4	0.32– 0.64	Bridge (southbound toll)	
East Harlem	0.4	0.64	FDR Drive south	Northbound exit and southbound entrance; exit 17 on FDR Drive
East Harlem	0.4	0.64	Harlem River Drive north	Northbound exit and southbound entrance; exit 17 on Harlem River Drive
East Harlem	0.6	0.97	East 125th Street / 2nd Avenue	Northern terminus; at-grade intersection
1.000 mi = 1.609 km; 1.000 km = 0.621 mi: Electronic toll collection; Incomplete access

=== Bronx Kill crossing (I-278) ===
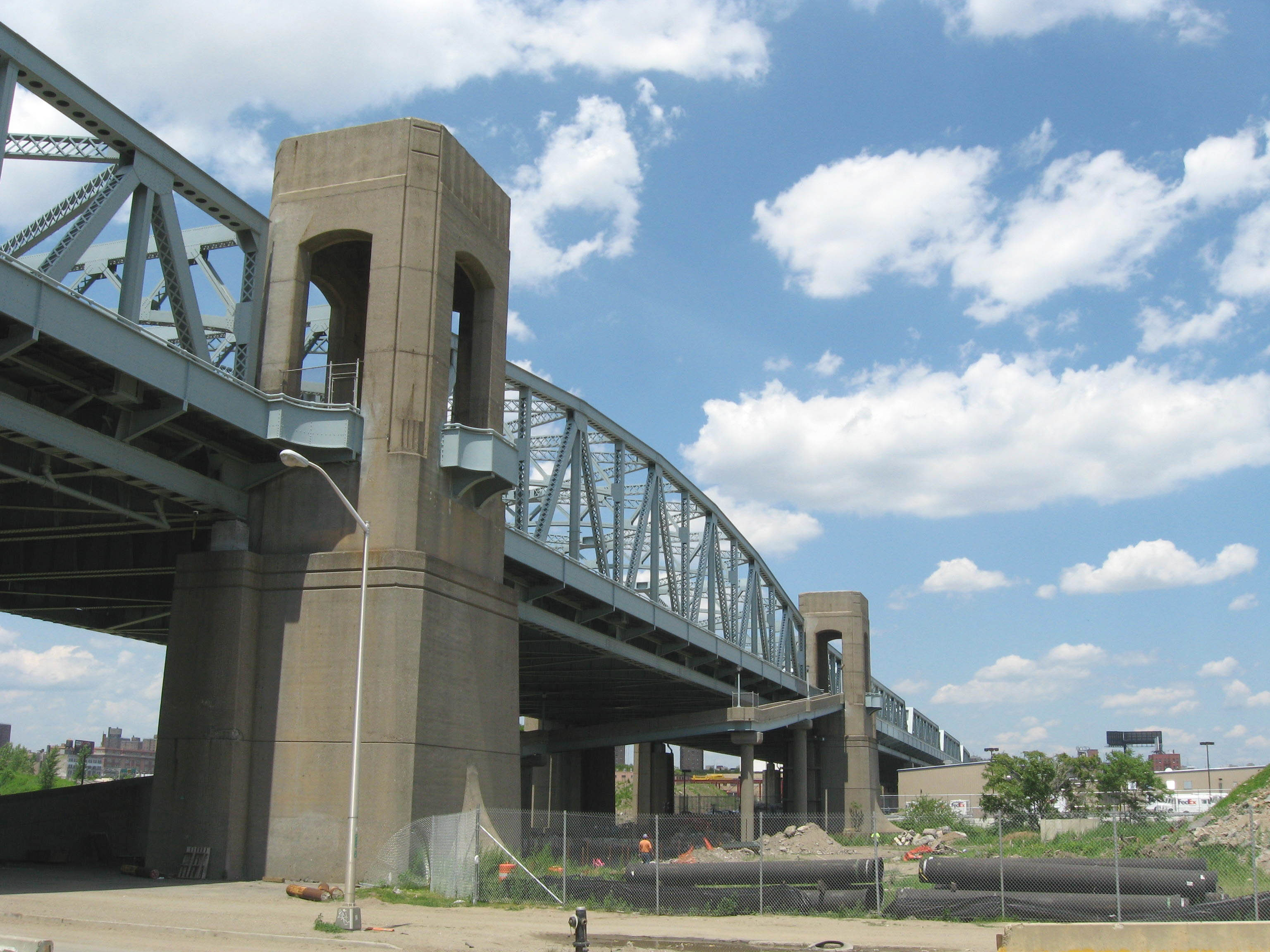
Bronx Kill crossing in 2008

The Bronx Kill span is a truss bridge that connects the Bronx with Randalls Island. It carries eight lanes of I-278, as well as two sidewalks, one on each side. The span connects to Major Deegan Expressway (I-87) and the Bruckner Expressway (I-278) in Mott Haven, Bronx. It originally connected to the intersection of East 134th Street and Cypress Avenue, a site now occupied by the interchange between I-87 and I-278. The truss span was designed by consulting engineers Ash-Howard-Needles and Tammen.

The Bronx Kill span contains three main truss crossings, which are fixed spans because the Bronx Kill is not used by regular boat traffic. The main truss span across the Bronx Kill is 383 feet (117 m) long, while the approaches are a combined 1,217 feet (371 m). The total length of the bridge is 1,600 feet (488 m). The truss span is 55 feet (17 m) above mean high water.

=== Interchange plaza and approach viaducts ===
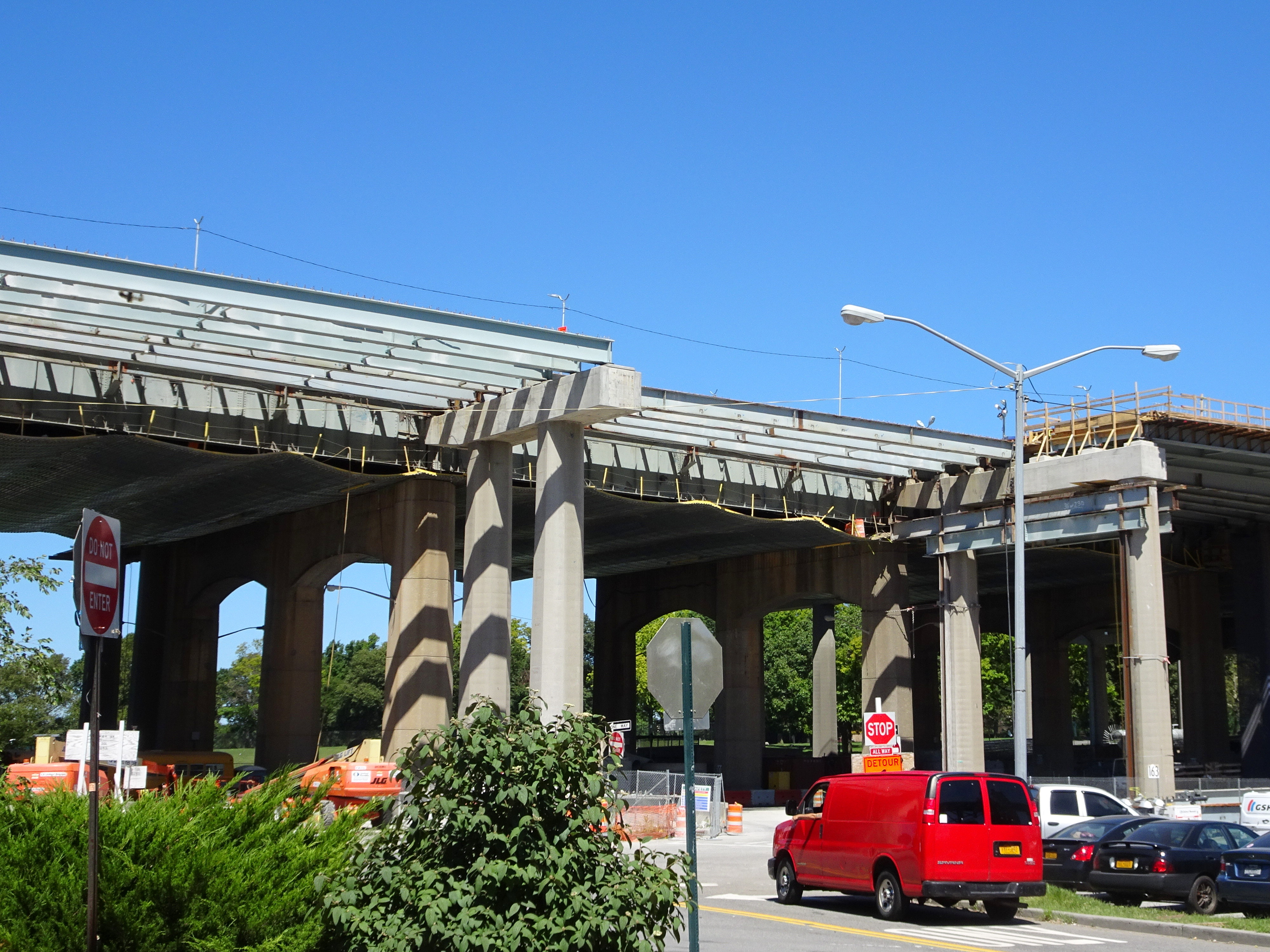
Renovation of interchange plaza viaduct, seen in 2016

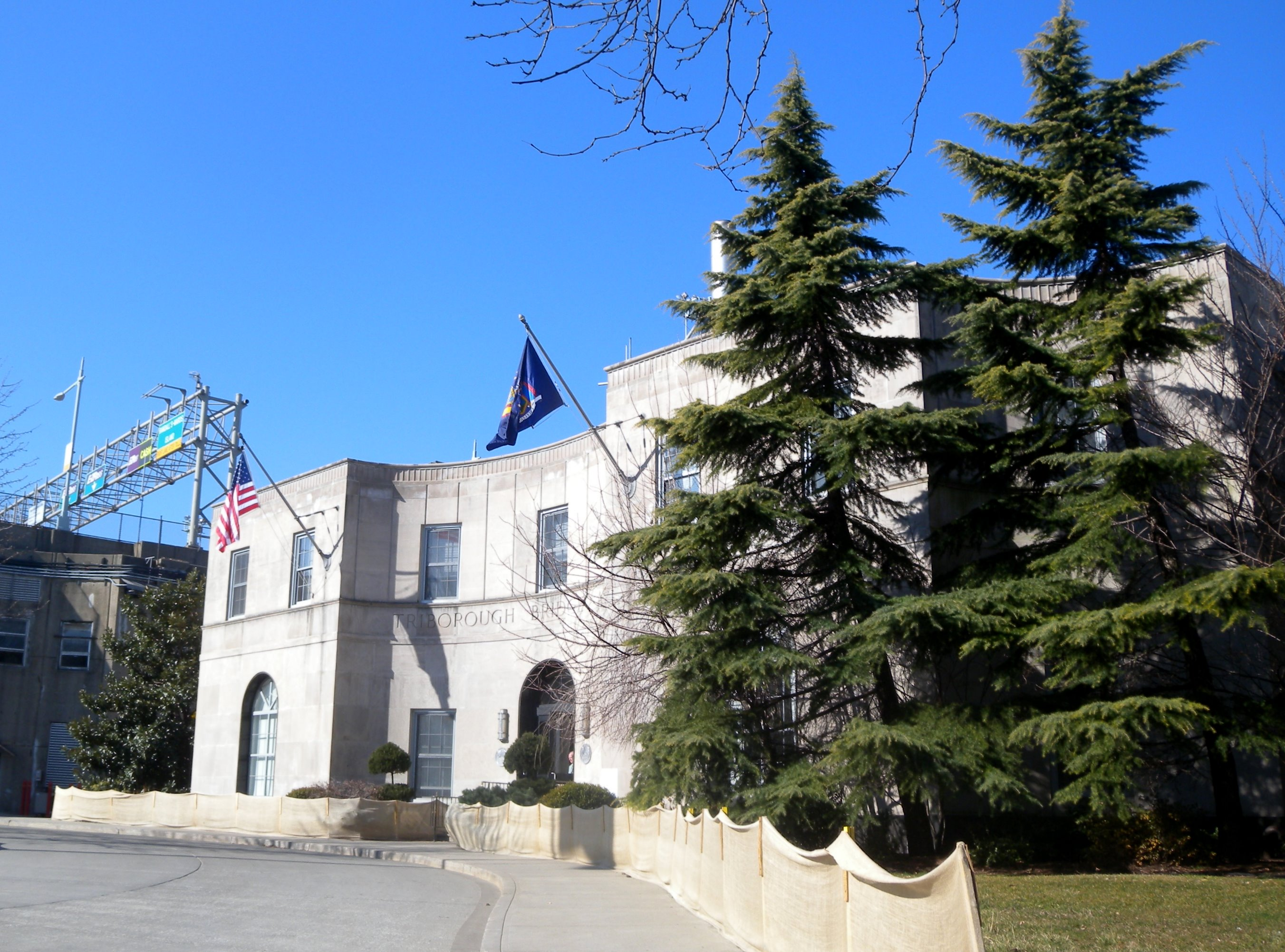
TBTA headquarters on Randalls Island, near the Manhattan span

The three spans of the RFK Bridge intersect at a grade-separated T-interchange on Randalls Island. The span to Manhattan intersects perpendicularly with the I-278 viaduct between the Bronx and Queens spans. Although I-278 is signed as a west-east highway, the orientation of I-278 on the bridge is closer to a north-south alignment, with the southbound roadway carrying westbound traffic, and the northbound roadway carrying eastbound traffic. Two circular ramps carry traffic to and from eastbound I-278 and the RFK lift bridge to Manhattan. Randalls and Wards Islands are accessed via exits and entrances to and from westbound I-278; to and from the westbound lift bridge viaduct; to eastbound I-278; and from the eastbound lift bridge viaduct. Eastbound traffic on I-278 accesses the island by first exiting onto the lift bridge viaduct.

The interchange plaza originally contained two tollbooths: one for traffic traveling to and from Manhattan, and one for traffic traveling on I-278 between the Bronx and Queens. The tollbooths were arranged so vehicles only paid one toll upon entering Randalls and Wards Islands, and there was no charge to exit the island. The elevated toll plazas had a surface area of about 9 acres (3.6 ha) and were supported by 1,700 columns, all hidden behind a concrete retaining wall. In 2017, the MTA started collecting all tolls electronically at the approaches to each bridge, and the tollbooths were removed from the toll plazas on the RFK Bridge and all other MTA Bridges and Tunnels crossings.

The Robert Moses Administration Building, a two-story Art Deco structure designed by Embury, served as the headquarters of the TBTA (now the MTA's Bridges and Tunnels division). The building was next to the Manhattan span's plaza, to which it was connected. In 1969, the Manhattan span's toll plaza was moved west and the I-278 toll plaza was moved south, and both toll plazas were expanded more than threefold. This required the destruction of the building's original towers. A room was built in 1966 to store Moses's models and blueprints of planned roads and crossings, but they were moved to the MTA's headquarters at 2 Broadway in the 1980s. The building was renamed after Moses in 1989.

The interchange plaza connects with the over-water spans via a three-legged concrete viaduct that has a total length of more than 2.5 miles (4.0 km). The segments of the viaduct rest atop steel girders, which in turn are placed perpendicularly between concrete piers spaced 60 to 140 feet (18 to 43 m) apart. Each pier is supported by a set of three octagonal columns. The viaduct is mostly eight lanes wide, except at the former locations of the toll plazas, where it widens. The viaduct once traversed Little Hell Gate, a small creek that formerly separated Randalls Island to the north and Wards Island to the south; the waterway has since been filled in. The viaduct rose 62 feet (19 m) above the mean high water of Little Hell Gate.

== Development ==
=== Planning ===
==== Initial plans ====
Edward A. Byrne, chief engineer of the New York City Department of Plant and Structures, first announced plans for connecting Manhattan, Queens and the Bronx in 1916. The next year, the Harlem Boards of Trade and Commerce and the Harlem Luncheon Association announced their support for such a bridge, which was proposed to cost $10 million. The "Tri-Borough Bridge", as it was called, would connect 125th Street in Manhattan, St. Ann's Avenue in the Bronx, and an as-yet-undetermined location in Queens. It would parallel the Hell Gate Bridge, a railroad bridge connecting Queens and the Bronx via Randalls and Wards Islands. Plans for the Tri-Borough Bridge were bolstered by the 1919 closure of a ferry between Yorkville in Manhattan and Astoria in Queens.

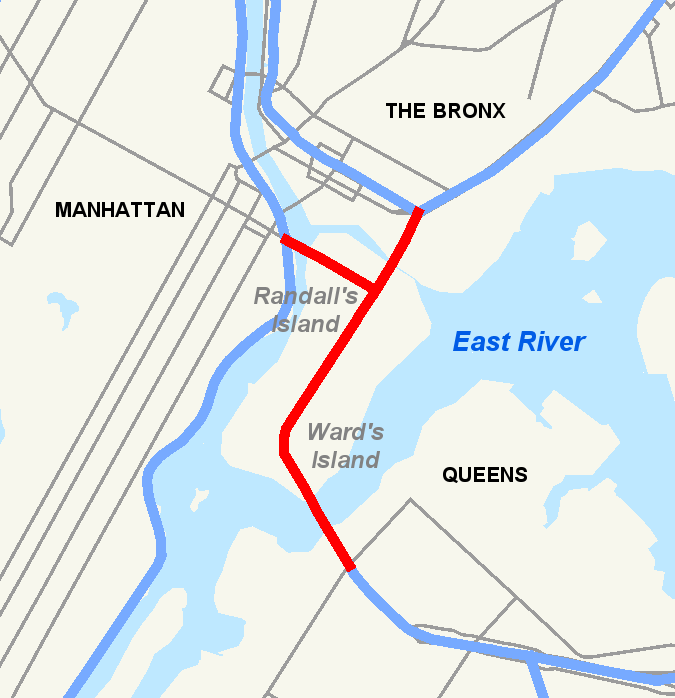
Map of the bridge's path, highlighted in red

A bill to construct the bridge was proposed in the New York State Legislature in 1920. Gustav Lindenthal, who had designed the Hell Gate Bridge, criticized the Tri-Borough plan as "uncalled for", as the new Tri-Borough Bridge would parallel the existing Hell Gate Bridge. He stated that the Hell Gate Bridge could be retrofitted with an upper deck for vehicular and pedestrian use. Queens borough president Maurice K. Connolly also opposed the bridge, arguing that there was no need to construct a span between Queens and the Bronx due to low demand. Connolly also said that a bridge between Queens and Manhattan needed to be built further downstream, closer to the Queensboro Bridge, which at the time was the only bridge between the two boroughs.

The Port of New York Authority included the proposed Tri-Borough Bridge in a report to the New York state legislature in 1921. The following year, the planned bridge was also included in a "transit plan" published by Mayor John Francis Hylan, who called for the construction of the Tri-Borough Bridge as part of the city-operated Independent Subway System (see § Public transportation). In March 1923, a vote was held on whether to allocate money to perform surveys and test borings, as well as create structural plans for the Tri-Borough Bridge. The borough presidents of Manhattan and the Bronx voted for the allocation of the funds, while the presidents of Queens and Staten Island agreed with Hylan, who preferred the construction of the new subway system instead of the Tri-Borough Bridge. The bridge allocation was ultimately not approved. Another attempt at obtaining funds was declined in 1924, although there was a possibility that the bridge could be built based on assessment plans that were being procured.

==== Funding ====
The Tri-Borough Bridge project finally received funding in June 1925, when the city appropriated $50,000 for surveys, test borings and structural plans. Work started on a tentative design for the bridge. By December 1926, the $50,000 allotment had been spent on bores. Around the same time, the proposal to convert the Hell Gate Bridge resurfaced. Albert Goldman, the Commissioner of Plant and Structures, had finished a tentative report for the Tri-Borough Bridge by that time; however, it was not immediately submitted to the New York City Board of Estimate as a result of a reorganization of the city's proposed budget. Goldman finally published the report in March 1927, stating that the bridge was estimated to cost $24.6 million. He explained that the Hell Gate Bridge only had enough space for five lanes of roadway, so a new bridge would have to be constructed parallel to it.

Though two mayoral committees endorsed the Tri-Borough plan, as did several merchants' associations, construction was delayed for a year because of a lack of funds. The Board of Estimate did approve $150,000 in May 1927 for preliminary borings and soundings. That September, a group of entrepreneurs proposed to fund the bridge privately. Under this plan, the bridge would be set up as a toll bridge, and ownership would be transferred to the city once the bridge was paid for. In August 1928, Mayor Jimmy Walker received a similar proposal from the Long Island Board of Commerce to build the Tri-Borough Bridge using $32 million of private capital. The Queens Chamber of Commerce also favored setting up tolls on the bridge to pay for its construction. Yet another plan called for financing the bridge using proceeds from a bond issue, which would also pay for the proposed Queens–Midtown Tunnel.

The Tri-Borough Bridge was being planned in conjunction with the Brooklyn–Queens Expressway, which would create a continuous highway between the Bronx and Brooklyn with a southward extension over The Narrows to Staten Island. In January 1929, New York City aldermanic president Joseph V. McKee endorsed the bridge, saying there was enough funding to begin one of four proposed bridges on the expressway's route. The newly elected borough president of Queens, George U. Harvey, also endorsed the bridge, as did Brooklyn Chamber of Commerce leader George Vincent McLaughlin. Trade groups petitioned Mayor Walker to take up the bridge's construction. By the end of the month, Walker acquiesced, and he had included both the Tri-Borough Bridge and a tunnel under the Narrows in his 10-year traffic program. The preliminary borings were completed by late February 1929. The results of the preliminary borings showed that the bedrock in the ground underneath the proposed bridge was sufficient to support the spans' foundations.

In early March, the Board of Estimate voted to start construction on the bridge and on the Narrows tunnel once funding was obtained. The same month, the board allocated $3 million toward the bridge's construction. Separately, the Board of Estimate voted to create an authority to impose toll charges on both crossings. In April 1929, the New York state legislature voted to approve the Tri-Borough Bridge as well as a prison on Rikers Island before adjourning for the fiscal year. The same month, New York state governor Franklin D. Roosevelt signed the bill to approve the move of about 700 beds in Wards Island's mental hospital, which were in the way of the proposed bridge's suspension span to Queens. The New York state legislature later approved a bill that provided for moving the Queens span's Wards Island end, 1,100 feet (340 m) to the west, thereby preserving hospital buildings from demolition.

==== Finalization of plans ====
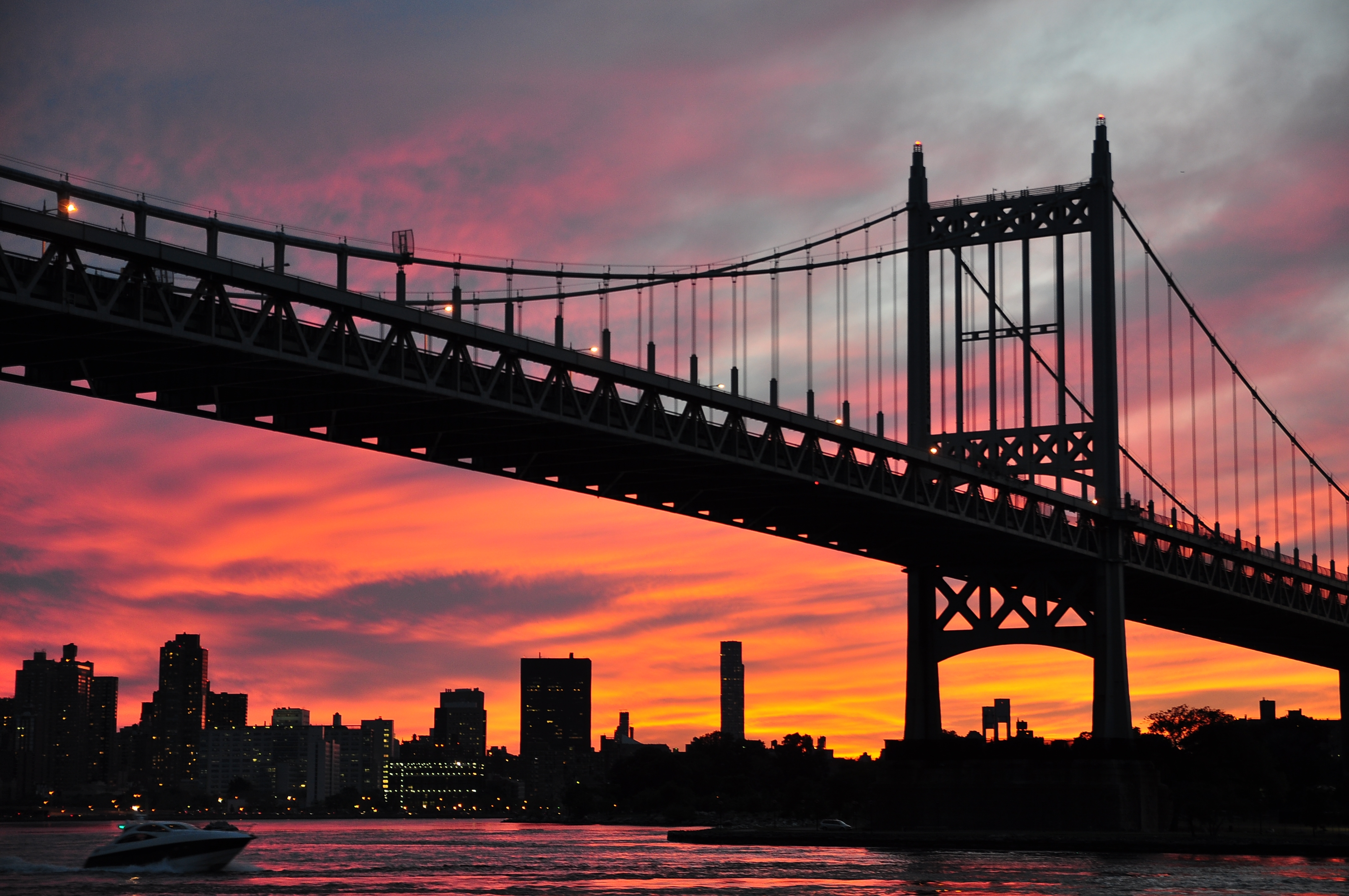
Queens suspension span over the East River, seen at dusk

The bridge was ultimately planned to cost $24 million and was planned to start construction in August 1929. By July, the groundbreaking was scheduled for September. The preliminary Triborough Bridge proposal comprised four bridges: a suspension span across the East River to Queens; a truss span across Bronx Kill to the Bronx; a fixed span across the Harlem River to Manhattan; and a steel arch viaduct across the no-longer-extant Little Hell Gate between Randalls and Wards Islands.

In August 1929, plans for the bridge were submitted to the United States Department of War for approval to ensure that the proposed Tri-Borough Bridge would not block any maritime navigation routes. Railroad and shipping groups objected that the proposed Harlem River span, with a height of 50 feet (15 m) above mean high water, was too short for most ships, and suggested building a 135-foot-high (41 m) suspension span over the Harlem River instead. Because of complaints about maritime navigational clearance, the Department of War approved an increase in the Harlem River fixed bridge's height to 55 feet (17 m), as well as an increase in the length of the Hell Gate suspension bridge's main span from 1,100 to 1,380 feet (340 to 420 m).

=== Initial construction ===
The scale of the Triborough Bridge project, including its approaches, was such that hundreds of large apartment buildings were demolished to make way for it. The structure used concrete from factories "from Maine to the Mississippi", and steel from 50 mills in Pennsylvania. To make the formwork for pouring the concrete, a forest's worth of trees on the Pacific Coast was cut down. Robert Caro, the author of a biography on Long Island State Parks commissioner and Triborough Bridge and Tunnel Authority chairman Robert Moses, wrote about the project:

Triborough was not a bridge so much as a traffic machine, the largest ever built. The amount of human energy expended in its construction gives some idea of its immensity: more than five thousand men would be working at the site, and these men would only be putting into place the materials furnished by the labor of many times five thousand men; before the Triborough Bridge was completed, its construction would have generated more than 31,000,000 man-hours of work in 134 cities in twenty states.

==== First contracts ====
The Board of Estimate approved the first contracts for the Triborough Bridge in early October 1929, specifically for the construction bridge piers on Randalls and Wards Islands and in Queens. This allowed for the start of construction on the Triborough Bridge's suspension span to Queens. A groundbreaking ceremony was held in Astoria Park, Queens, on October 25, 1929, just a day after Black Thursday, which started the Great Depression. Mayor Walker turned over the first spadeful of dirt for the bridge in front of 10,000 visitors. After the groundbreaking ceremony, further construction was delayed because the company originally contracted to build the piers, the Albert A. Volk Company, refused to carry out the contract. In early December, the contract for the piers was reassigned to the McMullen Company. Meanwhile, the Board was condemning the land in the path of the bridge's approaches. However, this process was also postponed because homeowners wanted to sell their property to the city at exceedingly high prices.

The War Department gave its approval to the Bronx Kills, East River, and Little Hell Gate spans in late April 1930, after construction was already underway on the Queens suspension span across the East River. A week later, the War Department also approved the Harlem River span, with another amendment: the span was now a movable lift bridge, which could be raised to allow maritime traffic to pass. Shortly afterward, a special mayoral committee sanctioned a $5 million expenditure for the Triborough project, and in July 1930, a $5 million bond issue to fund the Triborough Bridge's construction was passed.

Plans for an expressway to connect to the bridge's Queens end were also filed in July 1930. This later became the Brooklyn–Queens Expressway, which was connected to the bridge via the Grand Central Parkway. There were also proposals for an expressway to connect to the Bronx end of the bridge along Southern Boulevard. Robert Moses, the Long Island state parks commissioner, wanted to expand Grand Central Parkway from its western terminus at the time, Union Turnpike in Kew Gardens, Queens, northwest to the proposed bridge. The Brooklyn-Queens Expressway proposal, which would create a highway from the Queens end of the bridge to Queens Boulevard in Woodside, Queens, was also considered.

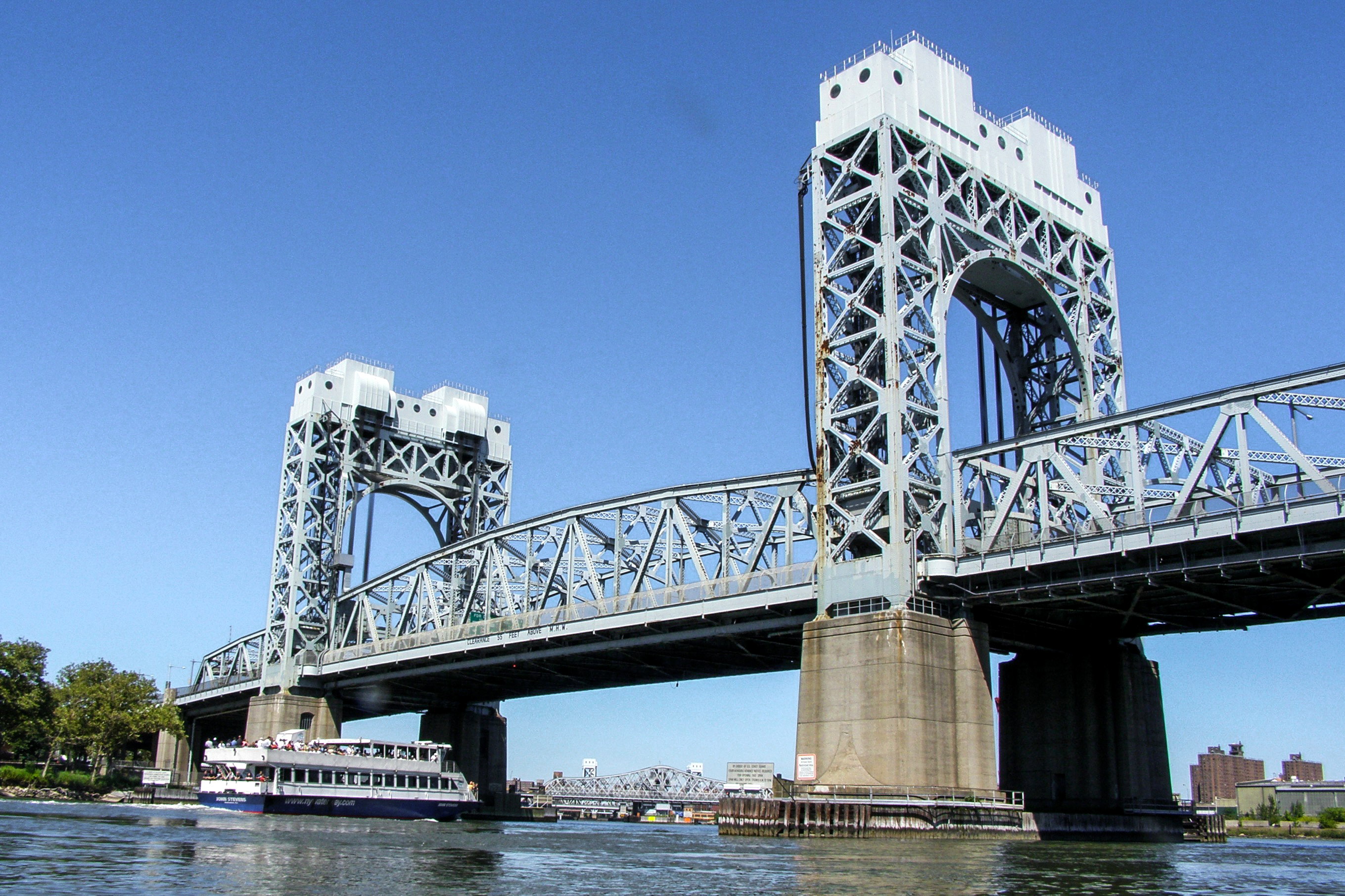
Manhattan lift bridge over the Harlem River

A contract to build the suspension anchorage on Wards Island was awarded in January 1931. At the time, progress on the bridge approaches was proceeding rapidly, and it was expected that the entire Triborough Bridge complex would be completed in 1934. By August 1931, it was reported that the Wards Island anchorage was 33% completed, and that the corresponding anchorage on the Queens side was 15% completed. Work on drainage dikes, as well as contracts for bridge approach piers, were also progressing. A report the next month indicated that the overall project was 6% completed, and that another $2.45 million in contracts was planned to be awarded over the following year. In October, contracts for constructing the bridge piers were advertised. By December 1931, the project was 15% completed, and the city was accepting designs for the Queens span's suspension towers. The granite foundations in the water near each bank of the East River, which would support the suspension towers, were completed in early or mid-1932. At the time, there were no funds to build six additional piers on Randalls Island and one in Little Hell Gate, nor were there funds to build the suspension towers themselves.

==== Funding issues ====
The Great Depression severely impacted the city's ability to finance the Triborough Bridge's construction. City comptroller Charles W. Berry had stated in February 1930 that the city was in sound financial condition, even though other large cities were nearing bankruptcy. However, the New York City government was running out of money by that July. The Triborough project's outlook soon began to look bleak. Chief engineer Othmar Ammann was enlisted to help guide the project, but the combination of Tammany Hall graft, the stock market crash, and the Great Depression which followed it, brought the project to a virtual halt. Investors shied away from purchasing the municipal bonds needed to fund it.

By early 1932, the Triborough Bridge project was in danger of cancellation. As part of $213 million in cuts to the city's budget, Berry wanted to halt construction on the span in order to avoid a $43.7 million budget shortage by the end of that year. With no new contracts being awarded, the chief engineer of the Department of Plant and Structures, Edward A. Byrne, warned in March 1932 that construction on the Triborough Bridge would have to be halted. Though Queens borough president Harvey objected to the impending postponement of the bridge's construction, the project was still included in the $213 million worth of budget cuts. Following this, Goldman submitted a proposal to fund the planning stages for the remaining portions of construction, so that work could resume immediately once sufficient funding was available.

In August 1932, Senator Robert F. Wagner announced that he would ask for a $26 million loan from the federal government, namely President Herbert Hoover's Reconstruction Finance Corporation, so there could be funds for the construction of both the Triborough Bridge and Queens-Midtown Tunnel. Queens borough president Harvey also went to the RFC to ask for funding for the bridge. Soon after, the RFC moved to prepare the loan for the Triborough Bridge project. However, when Mayor Walker resigned suddenly in September 1932, his successor Joseph V. McKee refused to seek RFC or other federal aid for the two projects, stating, "If we go to Washington for funds to complete the Triborough Bridge [...] where would we draw the line?" Governor Al Smith agreed, saying that such requests were unnecessary because the bridge could pay for itself. Harvey continued to push for federal funding for the Triborough Bridge, prioritizing its completion over other projects such as the development of Jamaica Bay in southern Queens. Civic groups also advocated for the city to apply for RFC funding.

In February 1933, a nine-person committee, appointed by Lehman and chaired by Moses, applied to the RFC for a $150 million loan for projects in New York state, including the Triborough Bridge. However, although the RFC favored a loan for the Triborough project, the new mayor, John P. O'Brien, banned the RFC from giving loans to the city. Instead, O'Brien wanted to create a bridge authority to sell bonds to pay for the construction of the Triborough Bridge as well as for the Queens-Midtown Tunnel. Robert Moses was also pushing the state legislature to create an authority to fund, build, and operate the Triborough Bridge. A bill to create the Triborough Bridge Authority (TBA) passed quickly through both houses of the state legislature, and was signed by Governor Herbert H. Lehman that April. The bill included a provision that the authority could sell up to $35 million in bonds and fund the remainder of construction through bridge tolls. George Gordon Battle, a Tammany Hall attorney, was appointed as chairman of the new authority, and three commissioners were appointed.

Shortly after the TBA bill was signed, the War Department extended its deadline for the Triborough Bridge's completion by three years, to April 28, 1936. Lehman also signed bills to clear land for a bridge approach in the Bronx, and he promised to resume construction of the bridge. That May, the TBA asked the RFC for a $35 million loan to pay for the bridge. The RFC ultimately agreed in August to grant $44.2 million, to be composed of a loan of $37 million, as well as a $7.2 million subsidy. However, the loan would only be given under a condition that 18,000 workers be hired first, so the city's Board of Estimate voted to hire 18,000 workers to work on the Triborough project. The funds for the Triborough Bridge, as well as for the Lincoln Tunnel from Manhattan to New Jersey, were ready by the beginning of September.

=== Construction resumes ===
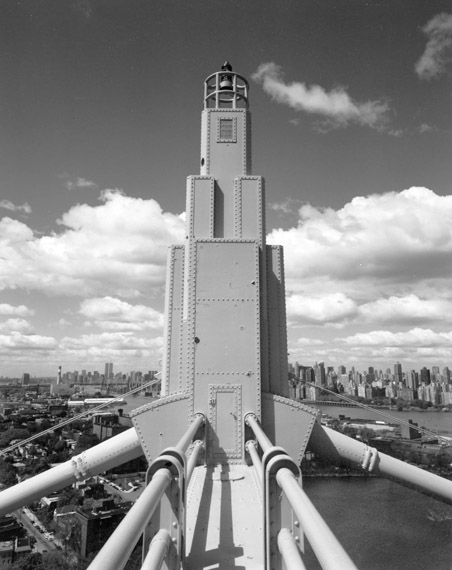
Art Deco saddle housing on Queens suspension bridge

The city purchased land in the path of the Triborough Bridge in September 1933, and construction on the Triborough Bridge resumed that November. By January 1934, contracts were being prepared for the completion of the suspension span and the construction of the other three spans; one of these contracts included the construction of the bridge's piers. That February, the TBA contemplated condensing the Queens span's 16-lane, double-deck roadway into an 8-lane, single deck road, as well as simplify the suspension towers' designs, to save $5 million. According to the agency, it would take 40 years for the bridge to reach a level of traffic where all sixteen lanes were needed. In April, a new plan was approved that would reduce the bridge's cost from $51 million to $42 million. Chief engineer Ammann had decided to collapse the original design's two-deck roadway into one, requiring lighter towers and lighter piers. The steel company constructing the towers challenged the TBA's decision in an appellate court, but the court ruled in favor of the TBA.

==== 1934 progress ====
By January 1934, the TBA was in turmoil: one of the TBA's commissioners had resigned, and New York City Mayor Fiorello H. La Guardia was trying another TBA commissioner, John Stratton O'Leary, for corruption. The TBA's general counsel also resigned. As a result, Public Works Administration (PWA) administrator Harold L. Ickes refused to distribute more of the RFC grant until the existing funds could be accounted for. Ickes also warned that he would cancel the RFC grant if the political disputes regarding the TBA were not cleared up. After O'Leary was removed, La Guardia appointed Moses to fill O'Leary's position, and Ickes also promised to give $1.5 million toward the bridge's construction, which the city received that March. Moses became the chairman of the TBA in April 1934, after a series of interim chairmen had held the post. Moses, who also had positions in the state and city governments, sought to expedite the project, awarding a contract in May for the construction of an approach highway to the Queens span.

A contract to clear land in the bridge's right-of-way was awarded in April 1934, and work began that month. Over 300 buildings had to be destroyed. Families living in the path of the bridge's approaches protested the eviction notices given to them. The Harlem Market on First Avenue, which stood in the way of the Manhattan approach, was to be moved to the Bronx Terminal Market. The construction of the Triborough Bridge across Little Hell Gate also required the demolition of hospital buildings on Randalls and Wards Islands. The New York City Department of Hospitals applied for funds to build the Seaview Hospital on Staten Island, which would house the hospital facilities displaced by the Triborough Bridge. Homes in Astoria and wooden docks were also demolished to make way for the bridge.

Moses continued to advocate for new roads and parkways to connect with the bridge as part of an interconnected parkway system. The complex of roads included the Grand Central Parkway and Astoria Boulevard in Queens; 125th Street, the East River Drive (now the FDR Drive), and Harlem River Drive in Manhattan; and Whitlock Avenue and Eastern Boulevard (now Bruckner Expressway) in the Bronx. The first of those roads, the Grand Central Parkway, was planned to start construction in early 1934. That July, the Department of War approved the Bronx Kill span as a fixed truss span, since the Bronx Kill was not a navigable waterway; the span could be replaced with a lift bridge if needed. The same month, the city approved the first segment of the East River Drive, leading from the intersection of York Avenue and 92nd Street to the Triborough Bridge approach at 125th Street. The bridge approach on the Bronx side was also finalized, running along Southern and Eastern boulevards, with a future extension to Pelham Bay Park in the northeastern Bronx.

Civic groups advocated for an approach highway from the West Bronx, and Bronx borough president James J. Lyons tried to block the Board of Estimate from approving the Manhattan approach highway until a West Bronx approach was also provided for. Despite this, in October 1934, the Board of Estimate approved the East River Drive approach while rejecting the West Bronx approach. While reformers embraced Moses's plans to expand the parkway system, state and city officials were overwhelmed by their scale, and slow to move to provide financing for the vast system. Partial funding came from interest-bearing bonds issued by the Triborough Bridge Authority, to be secured by future toll revenue.

==== 1935 progress ====
Financing disputes with the PWA involved complex political infighting. The disputes peaked in January 1935, when Ickes passed a rule that effectively prohibited PWA funding for the TBA unless Moses resigned the post of either TBA chairman or New York City Parks Commissioner. This came as a result of Moses's criticism that New Deal funding programs like the PWA were too slow to disburse funds. Moses refused to resign in spite of Ickes's persistence, and Ickes threatened to withhold salaries for TBA workers as well. Though La Guardia was supportive of Moses, even petitioning Roosevelt for help, he was willing to replace the TBA chairman if it resulted in funding for the bridge. In mid-March, Ickes suddenly backed down on his ultimatum; not only was Moses allowed to keep both of his positions, but the PWA also resumed its payments to the TBA. La Guardia re-appointed Moses to the TBA the same year.

Meanwhile, in February 1935, the TBA awarded a contract to construct the piers for the Harlem River lift structure. Despite an impending lack of funds due to the dispute between Moses and Ickes, the TBA announced its intent to open bids for bridge steelwork. By March, the suspension towers for the East River span to Queens were nearing completion, and support piers on Randalls and Wards Islands had progressed substantially. After the Moses–Ickes dispute had subsided, the TBA started advertising for bids to build the steel roadways of the Randalls and Wards Islands viaducts, as well as the East River suspension span. Less than a week afterward, the first temporary wires were strung between the two towers of the suspension span. The wires in the main cables were laid by machines that traveled along these temporary wires. A contract for the Harlem River lift span's steel superstructure was awarded that May, followed by a contract for the Bronx Kill truss span's structure the following month.

The spinning of the main span's suspension cables was finished in July 1935. By that time, half of the $41 million federal grant had been spent on construction, and the bridge was expected to open the following year. The bridge was expected to relieve traffic on nearby highways, and, with the upcoming 1939 New York World's Fair being held in Queens, would also provide a new route to the fairground at Flushing Meadows–Corona Park. The construction of the Bronx approach was delayed after the city's corporation council found that the approach could not be built using federal funds. By October 1935, the Queens approach and the Randalls and Wards Islands viaduct was nearly complete. Vertical suspender cables had been hung from the main cables of the Queens suspension span, and the steel slabs to support the span's roadway deck were being erected. The concrete piers supporting Bronx span were still being constructed, and the site of the Manhattan span was marked only by its foundations. The deck of the Queens suspension span was completed the following month. The work was dangerous, as some workers fell off the scaffolding that had been erected to allow them to build the suspension span, while others died due to lead poisoning.

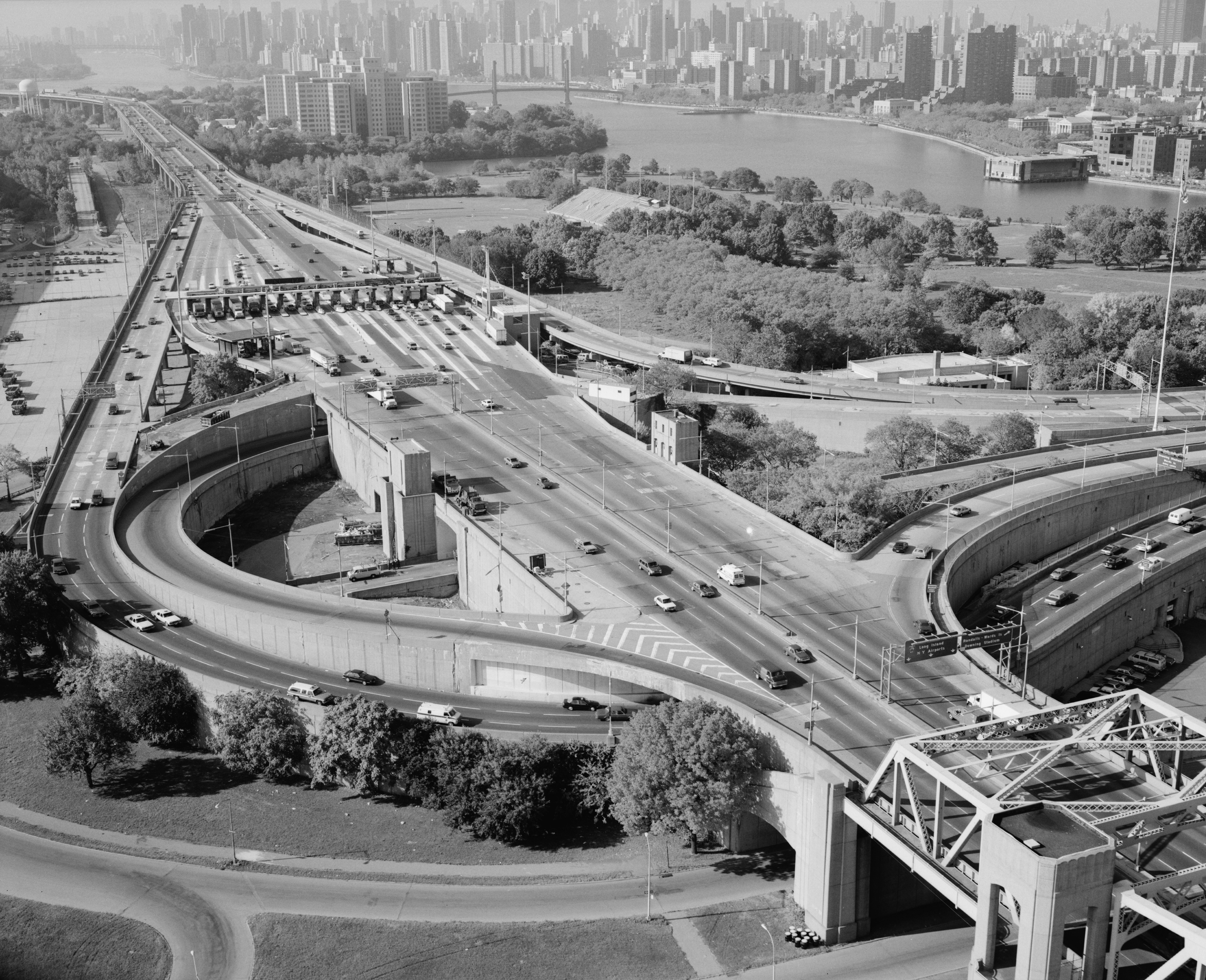
The interchange plaza between the Queens, Bronx, and Manhattan spans

In November 1935, a controversy emerged over the fact that the Triborough Bridge would use steel imported from Nazi Germany, rather than American producers. Although American steel producers objected to the contract, the PWA approved of it anyway, because the German steel contract was cheaper than any of the bids presented by American producers. Moses also approved of the decision because it would save money, and the TBA said that federal regulations had forced the agency to turn to a German manufacturer. La Guardia blocked the deal, writing that "the only commodity we can get from Hitlerland [Germany] is hatred, and we don't want any in our country", and Ickes also banned the use of imported materials on PWA projects. The TBA then re-awarded the contract to the Jones and Laughlin Steel Company.

==== 1936 progress ====
By February 1936, the TBA had awarded contracts for paving the Bronx Kill and East River spans, as well as for constructing several administrative buildings for the TBA near the bridge. Lyons continued to object to Moses's plans for the bridge's Bronx approach. Moses wanted to speed up construction on the Triborough Bridge so that it would meet a deadline of July 11, 1936. He objected to Ickes's decision, in March 1936, to decentralize control of PWA resident engineers, who would report to state PWA bosses instead of directly to the PWA's main office in Washington, D.C. Moses believed that the PWA boss for New York, Arthur S. Tuttle, was indecisive. In return, Ickes assured Moses of Tuttle's full cooperation.

The 300-by-84-foot superstructure of the Harlem River lift span was assembled in Weehawken, New Jersey. It was floated northward to the Triborough Bridge site in April 1936. Early the next month, the 200-ton main lift span was hoisted into place above the Harlem River in a process that took sixteen minutes. In addition, the city gave the New York City Omnibus Corporation a temporary permit to operate bus routes on the Triborough Bridge, connecting the bus stops at each of the bridge's ends, during the summer months. Moses appealed to Ickes to increase the construction workers' workweeks from 30 to 40 hours so the bridge would be able to open on time, but was initially rejected. A 40-hour workweek was approved that June. As late as the day before the bridge's opening on July 11, workers were still putting finishing touches on the bridge and surrounding highways.

A byproduct of the Triborough project was the creation of parks and playgrounds in the lands underneath the bridges and approaches. The largest of these parks was Randall's Island Park, located on Wards and Randalls Islands. The park on Randalls Island was approved in February 1935 and included an Olympic-sized running track called Downing Stadium, work on which began in mid-1935; the stadium was incomplete at the time of the bridge's opening. The plan included infilling a strait, Little Hell Gate, between the two islands. Smaller parks were also built in Astoria and Manhattan.

When the Triborough Bridge was finished, it was the largest PWA project in the eastern U.S., having cost $60.3 million (equivalent to $1 billion in 2025) according to final TBA figures. Based on expenditures, the PWA had originally estimated the bridge's cost to be as high as $64 million. In either case, the Triborough Bridge was one of the largest public works projects of the Great Depression, more expensive than the Hoover Dam. Of this, $16 million came from the city and $9 million directly from the PWA. The latter also purchased $35 million worth of TBA bonds, which were eventually bought back and resold to the public. The PWA had finished giving out the $35 million loan by February 1937, and the Reconstruction Finance Corporation had sold the last of the TBA's funds that July. Additional income came from toll collection: the toll was initially set at 25 cents per passenger car, with lower rates for motorcycles and higher rates for commercial vehicles.

== Operational history ==
=== Opening ===
The toll rates for the bridge were decided upon in March 1936. By May, the opening ceremonies for both the Triborough Bridge and the Downing Stadium were scheduled for July 11. The dedication was scheduled to occur on the Manhattan lift span, prompting objections from both Bronx and Queens officials. Due to the previous conflicts between President Roosevelt and Robert Moses, the attendance of the former was not certain until two weeks before the ceremony. PWA administrator Ickes's attendance was finalized only four days beforehand.

The completed structure, described by The New York Times as a "Y-shaped sky highway", was dedicated on Saturday, July 11, 1936, along with Downing Stadium. The ceremony for the Triborough Bridge was held at the interchange plaza, and was attended by Roosevelt, La Guardia, Lehman, Ickes, and Postmaster General James A. Farley, who all gave speeches. Robert Moses acted as the master of ceremonies. The ceremonies were broadcast nationwide via radio, and a parade was also held on 125th Street in Manhattan to celebrate the bridge's opening. Queens residents, excluded from the official ceremony, hosted an unofficial gathering in Astoria. The Triborough Bridge opened to the general public at 1:30 p.m., and by that midnight an estimated 200,000 people had visited the bridge. The bridge saw 40,000 vehicles on its first full day, July 12, and about 1,000 vehicles an hour on July 13, its first full weekdays. The TBA recorded 242,000 total vehicles in the bridge's first week, 953,100 during the first month, and 2.7 million in its first three months.

After the bridge's opening, one Queens civic group predicted that the bridge would increase real-estate values in Queens and on Long Island at large. The ferry between Yorkville, Manhattan, and Astoria, Queens, was made redundant by the new Triborough Bridge, and the city had closed the ferry by the end of July 1936. Traffic on the Queensboro Bridge, the only other vehicular bridge that connected Manhattan and Queens, declined after the Triborough Bridge opened, though not by as much as city officials had anticipated. In 1937, the first full year of the bridge's operation, it generated $2.85 million (equivalent to $63.83 million in 2025) in revenue from 11.18 million vehicles. This was far more than the 8 million vehicles that TBA officials had originally anticipated. The American Institute of Steel Construction declared the Triborough Bridge the "most beautiful" steel bridge constructed during 1936. Newsday, writing retrospectively in 1994, said: "More than any other structure, the Triborough unified the boroughs of New York City."

=== 1930s to mid-1960s ===
==== Highway construction ====
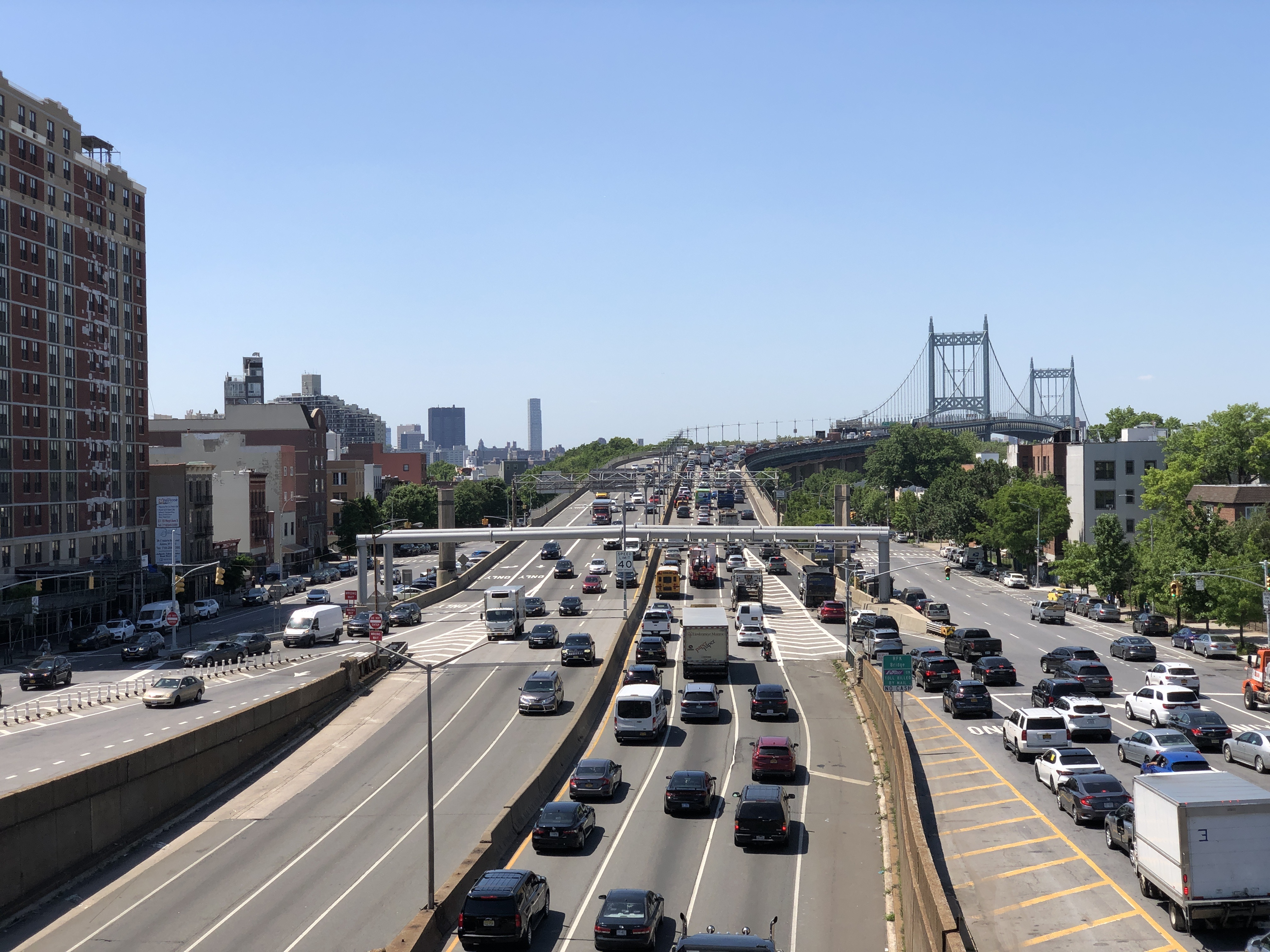
The Grand Central Parkway/I-278 approach to the bridge's Queens suspension span

When the bridge opened, none of the spans had direct connections to the greater system of highways in New York City. In Queens, the Grand Central Parkway extension to the Triborough Bridge was nearly completed at the time of the bridge's opening. The Manhattan span was planned to connect to the East River Drive (now the FDR Drive), the first segments of which were still under construction. The section of the East River Drive from the bridge south to 92nd Street opened that October. Originally, there was no direct access from the Queens span to Wards Island, but in November 1937, Moses announced the construction of a ramp from the Queens span that would lead down to the island. The next year, a lawsuit was filed by two Wards Islands landowners, who alleged that the Triborough Bridge had been built on portions of their land. They each received nominal damages of $1.

The Bronx span ended in local traffic at the no-longer extant intersection of 135th Street and Cypress Avenue. The first of two approach highways in the Bronx was approved late in 1936 and was partially funded by the PWA. Consisting of ramps to the intersection of 138th Street and Grand Concourse, this highway opened in April 1939 and later became part of the Major Deegan Expressway (Interstate 87). Another approach highway in the Bronx, the present Bruckner Boulevard, was approved in 1938 and extended eastward to the Bruckner Interchange. Both Bronx approach roads were completed in time for the 1939 New York World's Fair, which was held in Queens.

Moses continued expanding the system of highways in the mid-20th century, including arteries that led to the Triborough Bridge, namely the Brooklyn-Queens Expressway in Queens and the Bruckner Expressway in the Bronx. Both highways became part of I-278, as did the Queens and Bronx spans of the Triborough Bridge, by the 1960s. In the 1950s, there were also plans for a highway to be constructed between the Triborough Bridge's Manhattan span and a never-built 125th Street Hudson River bridge, which would have allowed direct highway access to the New Jersey Turnpike.

==== Bridge traffic and modifications ====
The Triborough Bridge Authority was headquartered in an administration building adjacent to the Manhattan span's toll plaza, where by 1940, it controlled the operation of all toll bridges located entirely within New York City. Though the Bronx–Whitestone Bridge between the Bronx and Queens opened in April 1939, the Triborough Bridge did not see any initial decline in traffic, likely because both spans were heavily used during the World's Fair. Soon after, vehicle rationing caused by the onset of World War II resulted in a decline in traffic at crossings operated by the TBA including the Triborough Bridge. Still, by 1940, the Triborough Bridge was the most profitable crossing operated by the TBA. The New York Times, describing the bridge as "generally recognized as a monument to engineering ingenuity", attributed the bridge's popularity to the design of its three spans. In 1941, one of the lift span's original gates was removed after a motorist damaged it.

Traffic decreased significantly during the war, declining to 5.1 million vehicles in 1943, though traffic counts again increased afterward. The TBA became the Triborough Bridge and Tunnel Authority (TBTA) in 1946, though TBTA operations continued to be managed from the Triborough Bridge. The bridge was repainted for the first time in September 1946 for $600,000. The bridge recorded over 100 million total vehicles in its first decade of operation. By 1951, the bridge accommodated 29.4 million vehicles a year, more than any other toll road in the U.S.; the TBTA claimed in early 1952 that the bridge was the busiest toll road in the world.

=== Late 1960s to 1990s ===
In 1968, the Triborough Bridge received its first major renovation in its 31-year history. Seven tollbooths were added, three at the Manhattan span's toll plaza and four at the Queens/Bronx spans' toll plaza, and several ramps were widened at a cost of $20 million. The project also added a direct ramp from the Manhattan span to the southbound lanes of Second Avenue in East Harlem. The TBTA administration building was also expanded during this project. Traffic from the Manhattan span was temporarily diverted during this project.

At some point in the 20th century, a sign on the bridge informed travelers, "In event of attack, drive off bridge"; according to New York Times columnist William Safire, the "somewhat macabre sign" must have "drawn a wry smile from millions of motorists". The TBTA replaced the movable toll gates across all of its toll booths in 1989, including those at the Triborough Bridge. By that year, pieces of concrete were falling off the bridge, prompting concerns about deterioration. By the early 1990s, the bridge accommodated about 160,000 daily vehicles, and the TBTA employed 140 toll collectors there. During that decade, the TBTA discovered high concentrations of lead under the bridge's Queens approaches, prompting the agency to remove the lead. The TBTA also rearranged the lanes at the bridge's toll plazas in 1992. The Triborough Bridge remained the TBTA's busiest facility in the 1990s, with over 200,000 daily vehicles.

In 1997, more renovations of the bridge were announced. The project consisted of three phases. The first phase involved renovating the Queens span and approach ramps, as well as replacing the suspender cables; work on the Queens span's anchorage began in February 1997. On the Queens side, an exit ramp from westbound I-278 to 31st Street necessitated the destruction of the entrance to the southern sidewalk. The second phase involved renovating the Bronx span and approach ramps. The third phase involved renovating the Manhattan span and approach ramps. By early 1999, there were more than 500 potholes on the bridge, requiring workers to use 22.5 short tons (20.1 long tons; 20.4 t) of concrete and 65 short tons (58 long tons; 59 t) of asphalt to repave the deck. Work on replacing the Queens span's suspender cables and adding an orthotropic deck to the Queens suspension span started in 2000. The replacement of the deck was estimated to cost $125 million.

=== 2000s to present ===
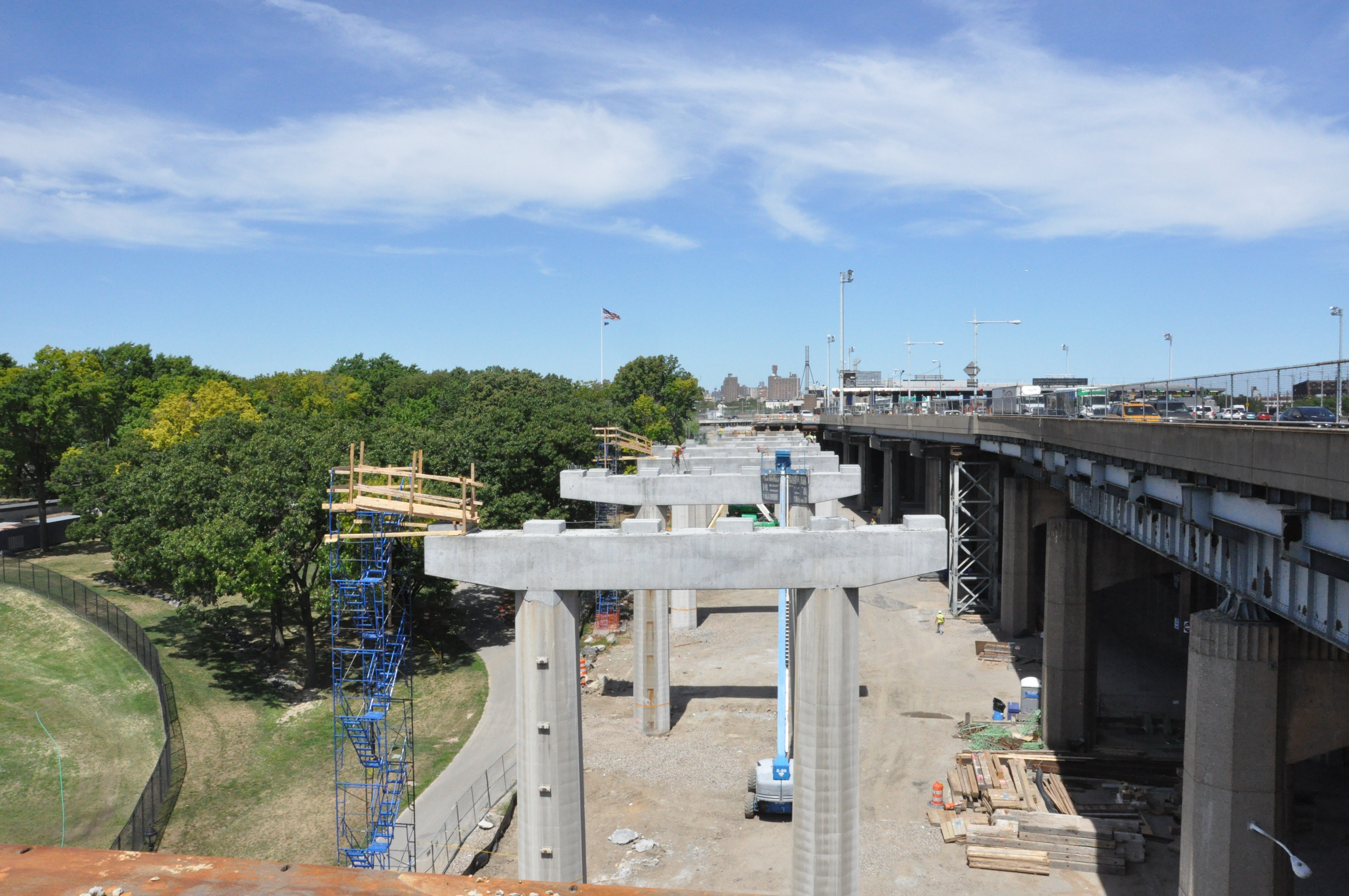
Reconstruction of the viaduct between the Manhattan lift span and the Queens suspension bridge span

In January 2008, then-governor Eliot Spitzer proposed renaming the bridge after former U.S. senator Robert F. Kennedy, who had been assassinated during a 1968 presidential bid. Though the Kennedy family supported the renaming, there were initial doubts over whether local residents would use the new name. The New York State Legislature approved the bill that June, and the Triborough Bridge was officially renamed after Kennedy on November 19, 2008. The MTA announced further renovations to the Triborough Bridge in 2008; the work included the replacement of the roadways at the toll plazas, as well as the rehabilitation of various ramps and the construction of a new service building. The same year, the MTA awarded contracts to renovate the Queens span's anchorages.

In 2015, the MTA started two reconstruction projects on different parts of the bridge as part of a $1 billion, 15-year program to renovate the bridge complex. The MTA commenced construction on a $213 million rehabilitation of the 1930s-era toll plaza between the Queens and Bronx spans, which included a rebuilding of the roadway and the supporting structure underneath. The new toll plaza structure was completed in 2019. Cashless tolling was implemented on June 15, 2017, allowing drivers to pay tolls electronically via E-ZPass or Toll-by-Mail without having to stop at any tollbooths. Shortly afterward, the tollbooths were demolished.

A ramp from the Manhattan span to the northbound Harlem River Drive was being built for $68.3 million, and was to be finished by December 2017; this was delayed pending the reconstruction of the Harlem River Drive viaduct around the area. In February 2020, the northbound Harlem River Drive ramp's completion was tentatively announced for 2021, though the ramp ultimately opened in November 2020. The project was expected to cost $72.6 million and involved designing a new overpass to fit between the Harlem River Drive's two existing roadways. The Harlem River lift span was also rehabilitated prior to 2020.

On December 15, 2021, the MTA Board approved a contract to construct a ramp to connect the walkway on the north side of the bridge's Manhattan span to a future park to be constructed along the Manhattan Greenway by the New York City Economic Development Corporation along the Harlem River south of East 127th Street. Work was expected to cost $19.6 million, and would be bundled with a $26 million project to upgrade and renew elements of the bridge. Work was expected to be done by spring 2023, with the ramp opening with the expected completion of the park in 2025.

== Usage ==
The toll revenues from the RFK Bridge pay for a portion of the public transit funding for the New York City Transit Authority and the commuter railroads. The bridge had annual average daily traffic of 164,116 in 2014. For that year, the bridge saw annual toll-paying traffic rise by 2.9% to 59.9 million, generating $393.6 million in revenue at an average toll of $6.57.

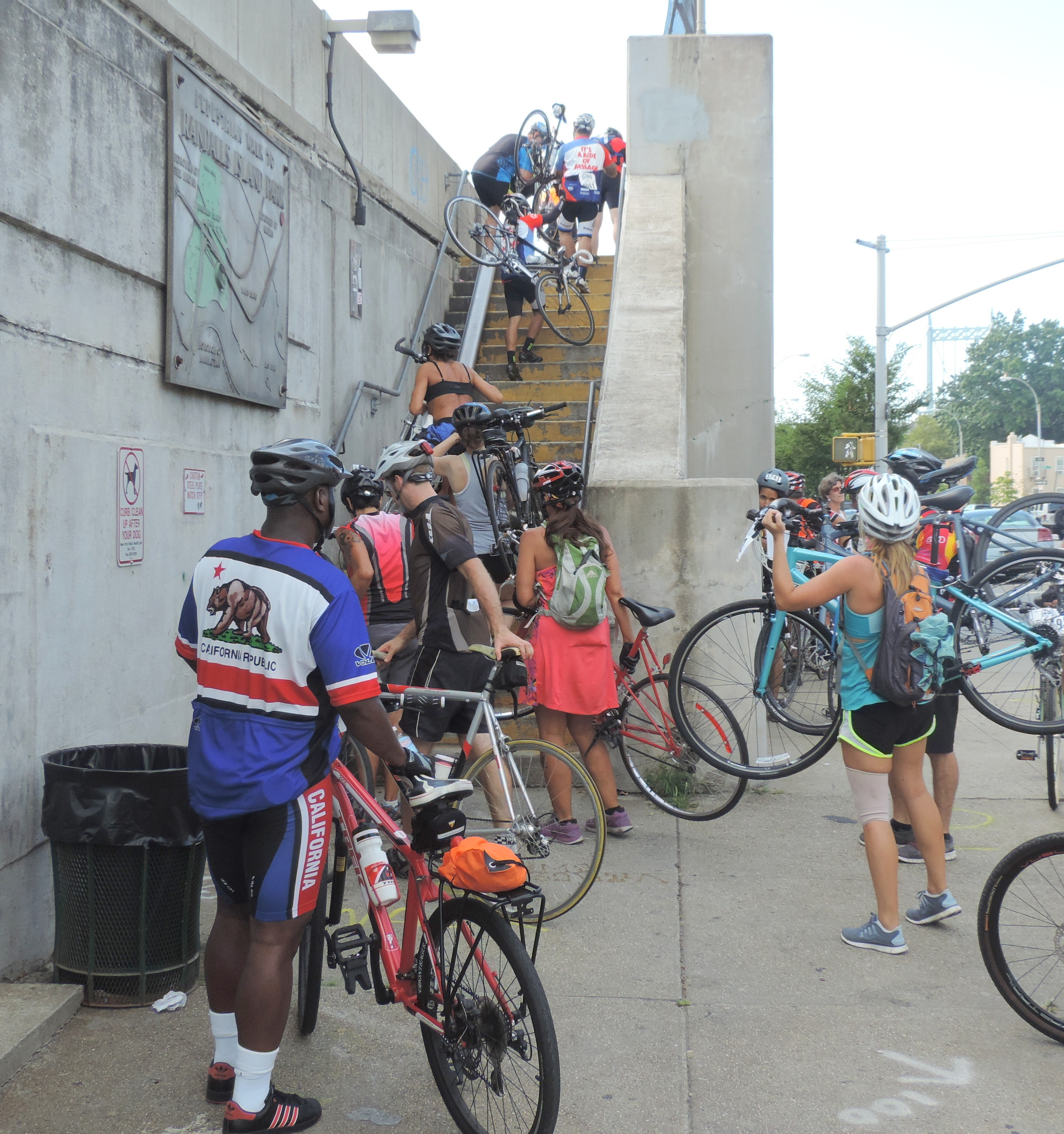
Entrance to the Queens span

=== Pedestrian and bicycle sidewalks ===
The bridge has sidewalks on all three spans where the TBTA officially requires bicyclists to walk their bicycles across due to safety concerns. However, the signs stating this requirement have been usually ignored by bicyclists, and the New York City Government has recommended that the TBTA should reassess this kind of bicycling ban. Stairs on the 2 km (1.2 mi) Queens span impede access by disabled people, and only the northern sidewalk on that span is open to traffic; the Queens end of the southern sidewalk was demolished in the early 2000s. The two sidewalks of the Bronx span are connected to one long and winding ramp at the Randalls Island end, though another pedestrian bridge between Randalls Island and the neighborhood of Port Morris, Bronx, opened to the east of the RFK Bridge in November 2015.

=== Public transportation ===
The RFK Bridge carries the M35, M60 SBS and X80 bus routes operated by MTA New York City Transit, as well as several express bus routes operated by the MTA Bus Company: BxM6, BxM7, BxM8, BxM9, BxM10 and BxM11. The M35 travels from Manhattan to Randalls and Wards Islands (with the X80 also operating during special events), while the M60 SBS runs between Manhattan and Queens, and the MTA Bus express routes travel between Manhattan and the Bronx. The M60 has used the bridge since the early 1990s.

In the 1920s, John F. Hylan proposed building the Triborough Bridge as part of his planned Independent Subway System. The proposal entailed extending the New York City Subway's BMT Astoria Line along the same route the Triborough now follows. It would have created a crosstown subway line along 125th Street, as well as a new subway line in the Bronx under St. Ann's Avenue.

== Tolls ==
As of January 4, 2026, drivers pay $12.03 per car or $5.06 per motorcycle for tolls by mail/non-NYCSC E-Z Pass. E-ZPass users with transponders issued by the New York E‑ZPass Customer Service Center pay $7.46 per car or $3.25 per motorcycle. Mid-Tier NYCSC E-Z Pass users pay $9.79 per car or $4.18 per motorcycle. All E-ZPass users with transponders not issued by the New York E-ZPass CSC will be required to pay Toll-by-mail rates.

When the Triborough Bridge opened, it had a combined 22 tollbooths spread across two toll plazas. Motorists were first able to pay with E‑ZPass in lanes for automatic coin machines at the toll plazas on August 21, 1996; in contrast to other MTA Bridges & Tunnels facilities where E-ZPass lanes were interspersed with cash only lanes, all of the E-ZPass lanes at either of the Triborough Bridge's toll plazas were grouped together. The implementation of E-ZPass allowed each toll lane to accommodate 900 vehicles an hour, compared with the 250 to 400 vehicles that the old toll lanes could accommodate.

Open-road cashless tolling began on June 15, 2017. The tollbooths were dismantled, and drivers are no longer able to pay cash at the bridge. Instead, there are cameras mounted onto new overhead gantries manufactured by TransCore near where the booths were formerly located. A vehicle without an E-ZPass has a picture taken of its license plate and a bill for the toll is mailed to its owner. For E-ZPass users, sensors detect their transponders wirelessly.

=== Historical tolls ===
Historical passenger tolls for the Robert F. Kennedy Bridge (Note: This table lists the peak tolls for two-axle vehicles. Motorcycle tolls and off-peak tolls are lower, and tolls for vehicles with additional axles are higher.)
Years	Toll		Toll equivalent in 2025		Ref.
Years	Cash	E-ZPass	Cash	E-ZPass	Ref.
1936–1972	$0.25	—N/a	$1.92–5.80	—N/a	
1972–1975	$0.50	—N/a	$2.99–3.85	—N/a	
1975–1980	$0.75	—N/a	$2.93–4.49	—N/a	
1980–1982	$1.00	—N/a	$3.34–3.91	—N/a	
1982–1984	$1.25	—N/a	$3.87–4.17	—N/a	
1984–1986	$1.50	—N/a	$4.49–4.41	—N/a	
1986–1987	$1.75	—N/a	$4.96–5.14	—N/a	
1987–1989	$2.00	—N/a	$5.19–5.67	—N/a	
1989–1993	$2.50	—N/a	$5.57–6.49	—N/a	
1993–1996	$3.00	—N/a	$6.16–6.69	—N/a	
1996–2003	$3.50	$3.50	$6.13–7.18	$6.13–7.18	
2003–2005	$4.00	$4.00	$6.59–7.00	$6.59–7.00	
2005–2008	$4.50	$4.00	$6.73–7.42	$5.98–6.59	
2008–2010	$5.00	$4.15	$7.38–7.48	$6.13–6.21	
2010–2015	$6.50	$4.80	$8.83–9.60	$6.52–7.09	
2015–2017	$8.00	$5.54	$10.51–10.87	$7.28–7.52	
2017–2019	$8.50	$5.76	$10.70–11.16	$7.25–7.57	
2019–2021	$9.50	$6.12	$11.29–11.96	$7.27–7.71	
2021–2023	$10.17	$6.55	$10.75–12.08	$6.92–7.78	
2023–2026	$11.19	$6.94	$11.19–11.82	$6.94–7.33	
2026–present	$12.03	$7.46	$12.03	$7.46	

== See also ==
- List of bridges documented by the Historic American Engineering Record in New York
- List of reference routes in New York
