= 125th Street Hudson River bridge =

Coordinates: 40.82°N 73.969°W

The 125th Street Hudson River bridge was a proposed bridge across the Hudson River between 125th Street in Manhattan, New York City and Cliffside Park or Fort Lee in New Jersey. It was never built.

The bridge was proposed by a study in 1954. Othmar H. Ammann designed a double-deck suspension bridge similar to the Verrazzano–Narrows Bridge for the Port Authority of New York and New Jersey, which would build the bridge. A Cross Harlem Expressway was to run across the Manhattan neighborhood of Harlem to a second deck of the Triborough Bridge, also at 125th Street; this had also been proposed in 1929. The project never got beyond planning, since funds were transferred to the Verrazzano Bridge, which Robert Moses's Triborough Bridge and Tunnel Authority had the power to build.
