= MTA Regional Bus Operations =

Bus operator in New York City

MTA Regional Bus Operations (MTARBO)

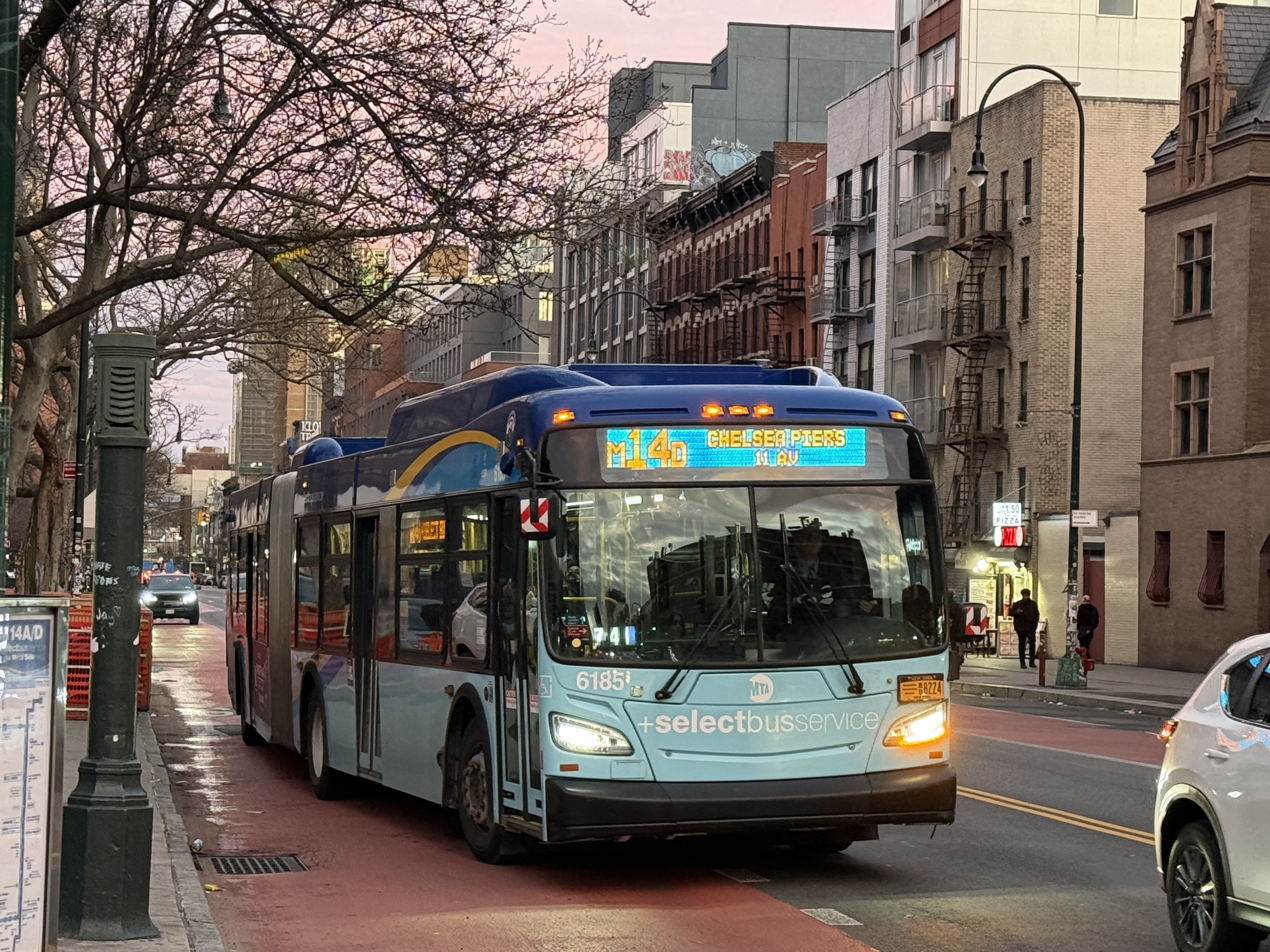
- Parent: Metropolitan Transportation Authority
- Founded: May 7, 2008
- Headquarters: 2 Broadway, Financial District, Manhattan
- Locale: New York metropolitan area
- Service area: New York City
- Service type: Local, Rush, Limited-Stop, bus rapid transit, and Express bus service.
- Routes: 345 total: 248 local routes; 77 express routes; 20 SBS routes
- Fleet: 5,840
- Daily ridership: 2,767,900 (weekdays, Q2 2026)
- Annual ridership: 823,295,300 (2025)
- Fuel type: CNG, diesel, electric, hybrid electric
- Operator: New York City Transit Authority, MTA Bus Company
- Executive: Frank Farrell, Executive Vice President
- Website: mta.info/nyct

MTA Regional Bus Operations (RBO) is the bus operations division of the Metropolitan Transportation Authority in New York City. The MTA operates local, rush, limited-stop, express, and Select Bus Service (bus rapid transit) services across the city of New York, forming a key part of the city's transportation system. The system's fleet of over 5,000 buses is the largest in the United States, and many of its over 300 routes operate 24/7.

MTA Regional Bus Operations was formed in 2008 to consolidate the MTA's bus operations, which currently consist of two operating companies. MTA New York City Bus operates citywide, with its origins in New York City's first municipal bus service in 1919. MTA Bus operates primarily in Queens, and was formed in 2004 to take over seven private bus companies. The two operating companies have distinct administration and history, but they operate as a single bus system, with unified scheduling, fares, and customer service.

In 2025, the system had a ridership of 823,295,300, or about 2,767,900 per weekday as of the second quarter of 2026.

== Brands and service area ==
MTA Regional Bus Operations provides public bus service in the southeast of the state of New York under several brands.

Regional Bus Operations is currently only used in official documentation, and not publicly as a brand. The current public brands are listed below:

- MTA New York City Bus – most routes within the City of New York, operated by the New York City Transit Authority (NYCT) and its subsidiary, Manhattan and Bronx Surface Transit Operating Authority (MaBSTOA).
- MTA Bus – service previously administered by the New York City Department of Transportation and operated by seven private companies at the time of the takeover, mostly concentrated in Queens, with some routes in the Bronx and Brooklyn, and most express service from Brooklyn, Queens and the Bronx to Manhattan. The seven former companies were, Command Bus Company, Inc.; Green Bus Lines, Inc.; Jamaica Buses, Inc., Liberty Lines Express, Inc.; New York Bus Service, Inc.; Queens Surface Corp.; and Triboro Coach Corp.

The most common livery scheme today is a straight blue stripe across the sides of the bus against a white base, with no colors on the front or back, and black window trim. From 1977 until late 2007, the livery was a full all-around stripe with a black rear, and until late 2010 (and still present on buses repainted during this time), the scheme was a stripe with a white rear and no rear stripe. Most buses operated in Select Bus Service bus rapid transit service are wrapped with a light blue-and-white wrap below the windows. In spring 2016, a new livery was introduced based on navy blue, light blue, and yellow, with a mostly blue front and sides, a light blue and yellow wave, and a yellow back. This new livery will gradually replace the blue stripe on a white base livery. The livery is commonly known as the MTA's Andrew Cuomo Scheme or Excelsior Scheme (after the state motto for New York).

RBO is led by Frank Farrell, the Executive Vice President of the NYCT Department of Buses and MTA Bus. Currently, many RBO's operational changes have been at the management level, with the creation of a unified command center and consolidation of management for all bus operations, with the aim of reducing redundancies in the agency. Other changes have included eliminating the MTA Bus call center, folding it into that of MTA New York City Transit, and the unification of the fare policy for all of the MTA's services.

== History ==
The history of the MTA's bus operations generally follows the history of the New York City Transit Authority (NYCT) (also known as MTA New York City Transit) which was created on June 15, 1953, by the State of New York to take over operations then operated by the New York City Board of Transportation. In 1962, the State established the Manhattan and Bronx Surface Transit Operating Authority (MaBSTOA) as a subsidiary of NYCT to take over operations then operated by two private companies, Fifth Avenue Coach Lines, Inc. and Surface Transit, Inc. Both NYCT and MaBSTOA operate service pursuant to a lease agreement with the City of New York.

=== MTA New York City Bus ===
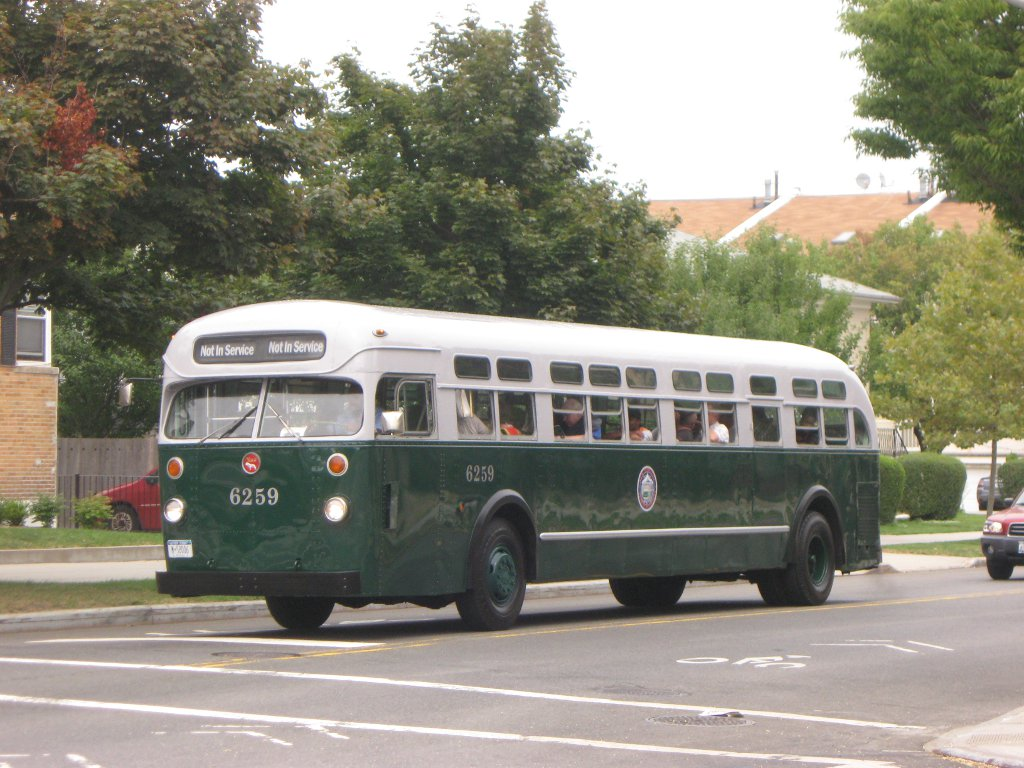
An early livery for the NYC Transit Authority

City involvement with surface transit in the city began in September 1919, when Mayor John Francis Hylan, through the New York City Department of Plant and Structures (DP&S), organized private entrepreneurs to operate "emergency" buses to replace four abandoned storage battery streetcar lines: the Madison Street Line, Spring and Delancey Streets Line, Avenue C Line, and Sixth Avenue Ferry Line. Many routes were soon added, replacing lines such as the Brooklyn and North River Line (trolleys) and Queens Bus Lines (buses), and the DP&S also began operating trolleys in Staten Island to replace the Staten Island Midland Railway's system.

Another city acquisition was the Bridge Operating Company, which ran the Williamsburg Bridge Local trolley, acquired in 1921 by the DP&S. Unlike the other lines, this one remained city-operated, and was replaced by the B39 bus route on December 5, 1948, by then transferred to the New York City Board of Transportation.

With the city takeover of the Brooklyn–Manhattan Transit Corporation's surface subsidiary, the Brooklyn and Queens Transit Corporation, on June 2, 1940, the city gained a large network of trolley and bus lines, covering all of Brooklyn and portions of Queens. On February 23, 1947, the Board of Transportation took over the Staten Island bus network of the Isle Transportation Company. Further acquisitions were made on March 30, 1947, with the North Shore Bus Company in Queens, and September 24, 1948, with the East Side Omnibus Corporation and Comprehensive Omnibus Corporation in Manhattan. The final Brooklyn trolleys were the Church Avenue Line and McDonald Avenue Line, discontinued on October 31, 1956, though the privately operated (by the Queensboro Bridge Railway) Queensboro Bridge Local remained until 1957.

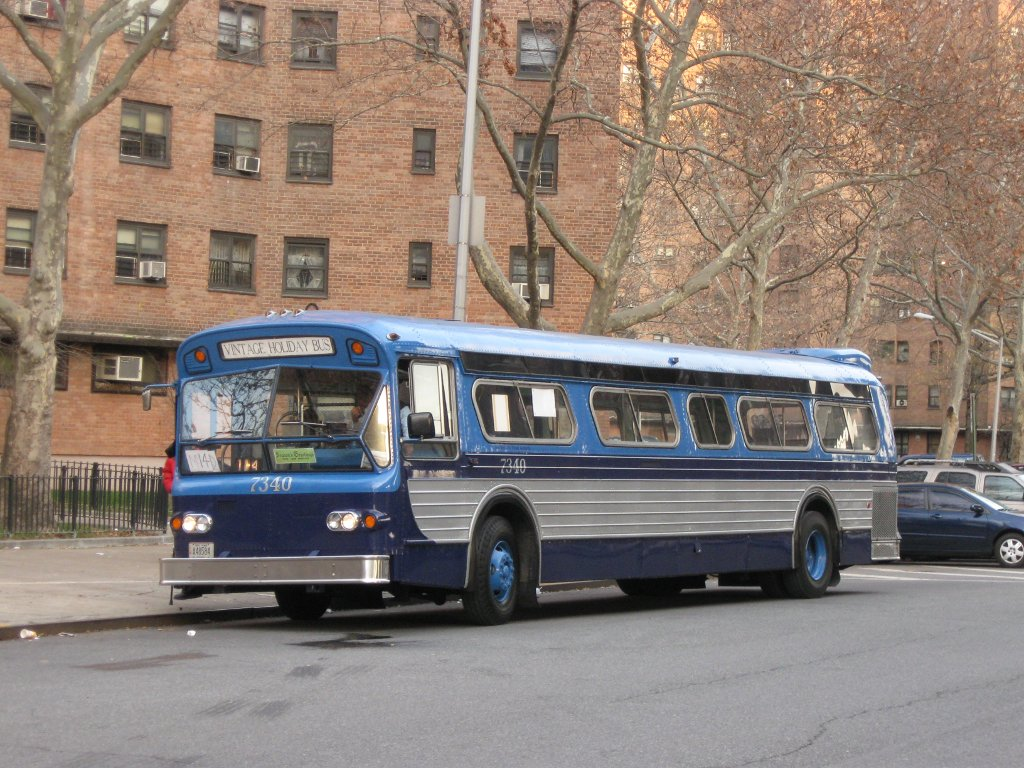
The early 1970s livery, using a blue base. This bus, a Flxible New Look, is operating in special holiday service in 2008.

By the late 1950s, the city operated all local service in Staten Island and Brooklyn, approximately half of the local Queens service, and several Manhattan routes. Several private companies operated buses in Queens, and the Avenue B and East Broadway Transit Company operated a small Manhattan system. The largest system was the Fifth Avenue Coach Company and Surface Transit, which operated almost all Manhattan routes and all Bronx routes, plus two into Queens (15 Fifth Avenue – Jackson Heights and TB Triborough Bridge) and one within Queens (16 Elmhurst Crosstown). After a strike in 1962, the city condemned the assets of the bus companies.

To facilitate the anticipated sale of the bus service back to private ownership, a new agency, the Manhattan and Bronx Surface Transit Operating Authority (MaBSTOA) was formed as a subsidiary of the New York City Transit Authority to operate the former Fifth Avenue Coach Lines, Inc. and Surface Transit, Inc. routes under lease from the city. The final acquisition was in 1980, when MaBSTOA took over operations of the Avenue B & East Broadway Transit Co. Inc.'s routes, using MaBSTOA equipment with Avenue B red route roll signs (NYCTA acquired the 13 Grumman Flxibles that had been assigned to Avenue B and placed them in NYCTA service).

In late 1981, the MTA merged the New York City Transit Authority's Surface Division (aka NYCTA Civil Service) with the Manhattan & Bronx Surface Transit Operating Authority (aka MaBSTOA Non Civil Service) into one single entity using the MTA New York City Transit Authority (or MTA – New York City Bus) moniker instead of the former.

Public takeover of the remaining Queens buses, as well as most express routes, was implemented in 2005 and 2006 when the city purchased the assets of seven private bus companies, and entered into an agreement with the new MTA Bus Company for their operation and funding. In 2008, the bus operations of New York City Transit and MTA Bus Company (as well as the now former Long Island Bus division) were merged into a new regional operation, MTA Regional Bus Operations. The New York City Bus and MTA Bus brands continue to be used on all buses, but New York City Transit (NYCT), Manhattan and Bronx Surface Transit Operating Authority (MaBSTOA), and MTA Bus Company continue to be the legal entities operating the services.

=== MTA Bus ===
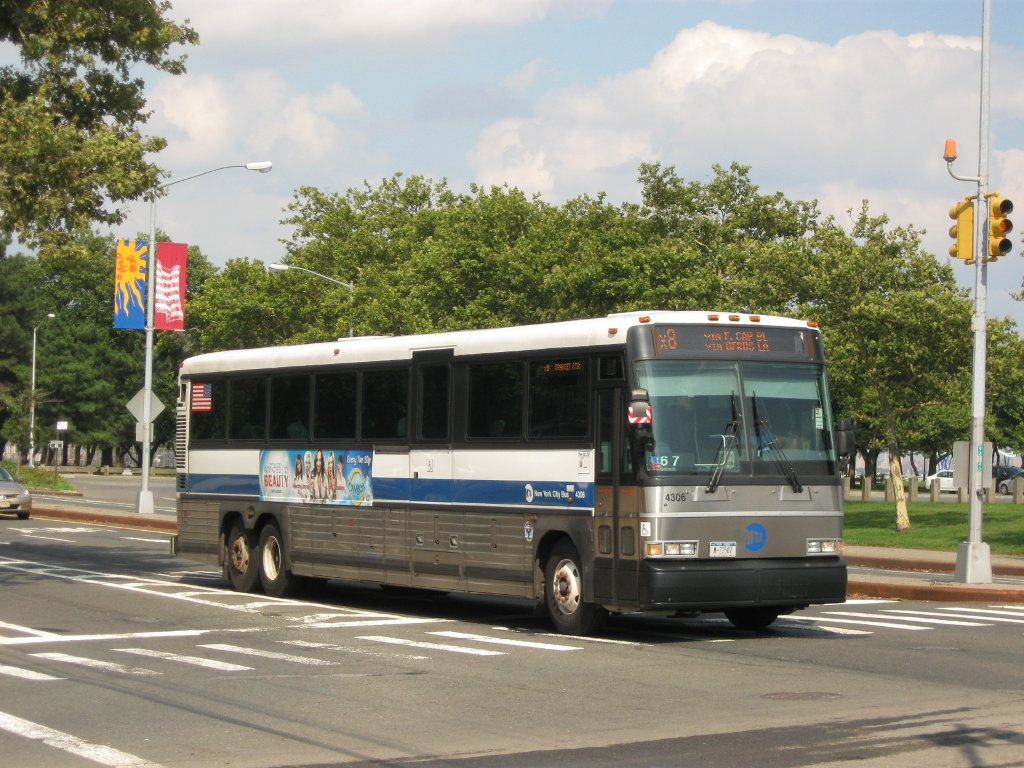
A typical vehicle, a 2007 MCI cruiser, used in express bus service. This example wears the livery used from 1977 until 2016.

MTA Bus Company was established as a subsidiary public benefit corporation in late 2004 to operate bus services resulting from the city's takeover of the privately operated bus route operations previously administered and subsidized by the NYCDOT.

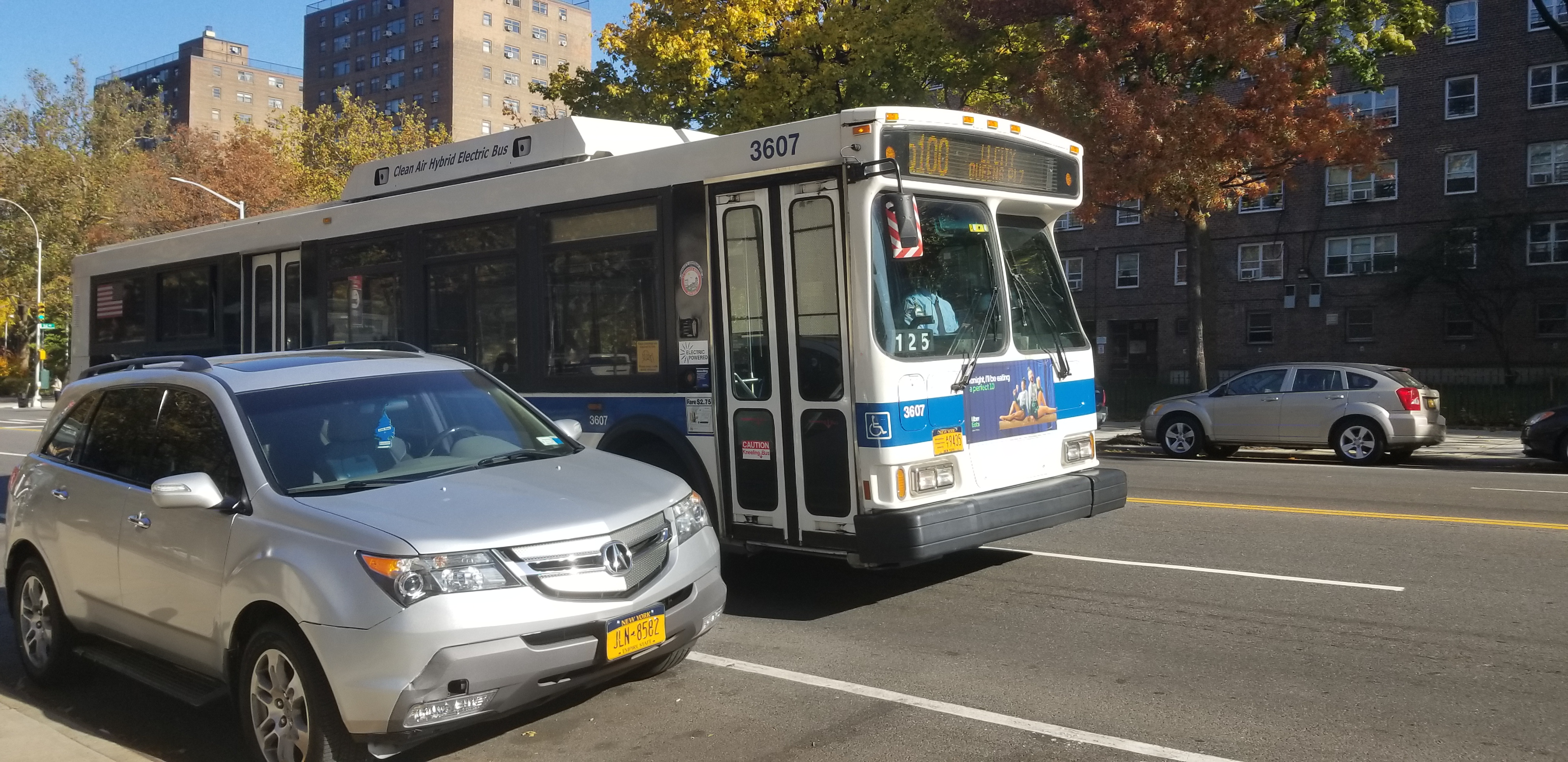
A MTA Bus Orion VII Old Gen on the Q100 Limited; this route used to be part of Queens Surface Corporation as the Q101R, till MTA takeover in 2005.

The routes were taken over on a staggered schedule, beginning with the former Liberty Lines Express bus routes on January 3, 2005, Queens Surface Corporation bus routes on February 27, 2005, New York Bus Service bus routes on July 1, 2005, Command Bus Company bus routes on December 5, 2005, Green Bus Lines bus routes on January 9, 2006, and Jamaica Buses bus routes on January 30, 2006. Triboro Coach Corporation, the final remaining company, ceased operating on February 20, 2006.

Up until January 3, 2022, the only NYCDOT-subsidized lines not consolidated into the MTA were those run by Academy Bus and formerly by Atlantic Express until their bankruptcy in 2013. Academy Bus previously operated those routes and others until 2001, when Atlantic Express and NYCT took them over. Although the X23, and X24 routes were absorbed by Atlantic Express, the X17J, X21, X22, and X30 routes were absorbed by the New York City Transit Authority. NYCT discontinued service on the X21 months after the takeover. At the time, NYS Assemblyman Lou Tobacco and NYS Senator Andrew Lanza, along with U.S. Congressman Michael E. McMahon and NYC Councilmen Vincent Ignizio and James Oddo have asked the MTA to look into the possible consolidation of the remainder of the NYCDOT routes.

In Brooklyn, a company called Private Transportation operates the B110 route. This is franchised but not subsidized by NYCDOT. Atlantic Express also ran the AE7 express route from the Tottenville and Travis neighborhoods of Staten Island in the same manner as the Private Transportation B110 local route. Citing low ridership and increased costs, Atlantic Express canceled the AE7 service on December 31, 2010. Councilmen Ignizio and Oddo as well as Congressman Michael G. Grimm have called on the MTA to revamp that route also.

During late 2021, due to an external lawsuit with the garage that operated the SIM23 and SIM24, the MTA announced the takeover of the two lines was imminent. On January 3, 2022, the MTA assumed control over the SIM23 and SIM24 routes formerly run by Academy. These routes are operated by New York City Transit out of the Charleston Depot. As a result of the takeover, the MTA modified the schedule and added two new trips in both directions for both routes.

=== Merger ===
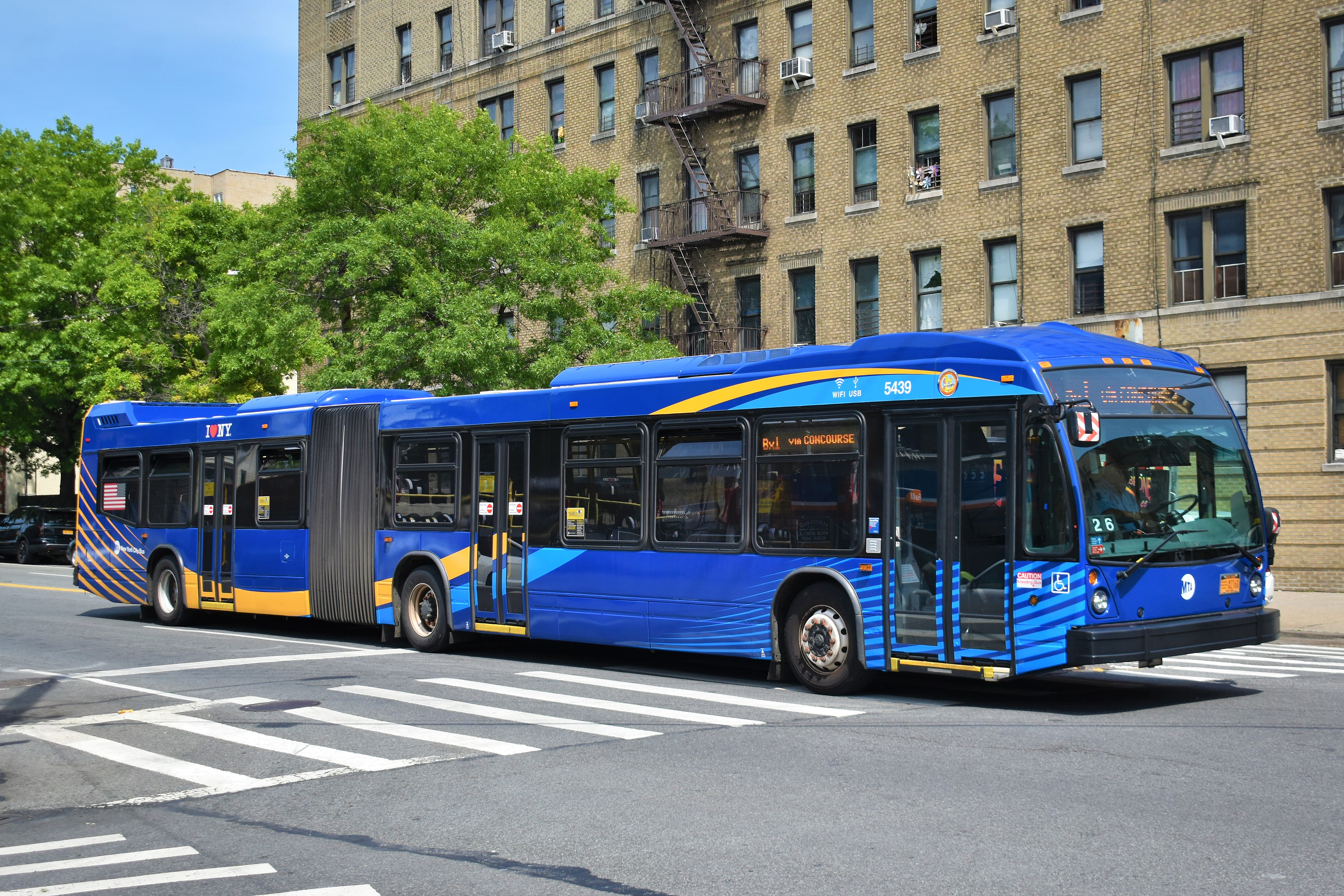
An MTA articulated Nova Bus LFS articulated bus in the current livery, introduced in spring 2016

The current system came into being in the mid-2000s following the MTA's assumption, through its subsidiary MTA Bus Company (MTABC), of services previously operated by private carriers under operating authority agreements administered by the New York City Department of Transportation, the successor to the New York City Bureau of Franchises. MTABC operates service pursuant to an agreement with the City of New York under which all expenses of MTABC, less operating revenues, are reimbursed. This brought almost all bus transportation in New York City under its control.

After the bus mergers were completed in 2006, the MTA then moved to streamline its operations through consolidation of management function. To that effect, RBO was officially created in May 2008, with the president of what was then MTA New York City Transit's Department of Buses, Joseph J. Smith, named to lead the consolidated bus operations. MTA Regional Bus also included the MTA Long Island Bus division until December 2011, when its services were transferred to the private operator Veolia Transport.

In 2008, the bus operations of MTA Bus Company and New York City Transit (as well as the now former Long Island Bus division) were merged into a new regional operation, MTA Regional Bus Operations. The MTA Bus and New York City Bus brands continue to be used. Both were removed from buses delivered from 2016 on, showcasing only the MTA logo, and the blue-stripe livery was replaced with a new blue-and-yellow livery. A few years later, the MTA Bus and New York City Bus brands were put once again, and buses that did not have them got them back. The first order with the new livery, 75 articulated buses for MTA Bus, were delivered in spring and summer 2016.

Until December 31, 2011, MTA Regional Bus Operations also operated Nassau County's bus and paratransit service (Able-Ride), formerly known as Long Island Bus. This service was operated by the MTA under an agreement with Nassau County, who owned its facilities and equipment. In 2011, the MTA asked Nassau County to provide more funding for Long Island Bus than they were at the time. The county refused to provide additional funding, and the MTA voted to end operation of the system at the end of 2011. The county then decided to hire Veolia Transport (now Transdev), a private transportation company, to operate the system in place of the MTA beginning in 2012. The system was then rebranded "Nassau Inter-County Express" on January 1, 2012.

== Operations ==
MTA Regional Bus routes are spread out across New York City. However, some bus routes may also operate to areas beyond city limits. The Q5, Q87 and Q89 routes cross the Nassau County border to go to the Green Acres Mall in Valley Stream. The Q2 and Q82 Rush routes leave Queens as they run along Hempstead Turnpike and onto the Cross Island Parkway, and Belmont Racetrack in Elmont, where they turn-around and re-enter the city. The QM64 Express bus serves another portion of Elmont, running to Dutch Broadway in the Alden Manor subsection. The Q46 Rush and QM6 Express buses run along Lakeville Road in Lake Success, Nassau County, upon entering Long Island Jewish Medical Center and North Shore Towers, respectively. The Q113 Limited and Q114 Rush cross into Nassau County between Southeast Queens and Far Rockaway. During peak hours, select Q111 Rush buses run to Cedarhurst in Nassau County.

The Bx7, Bx9, Bx10, Bx16, Bx31 and Bx34 buses make their last stops at the Bronx–Westchester border. BxM3 express buses leave the city as they operate to Getty Square in Yonkers. The Q4, Q12, Q30, Q43, Q110 and Q111 buses make their last stops at the Queens-Nassau border. The S89 is the only route to have a stop outside state borders, terminating at the 34th Street Hudson-Bergen Light Rail station in Bayonne, New Jersey. Some Staten Island express routes run via New Jersey, but do not stop in the state.

Local bus routes are labeled with a number and a prefix identifying the primary borough of operation (B for Brooklyn, Bx for the Bronx, M for Manhattan, Q for Queens, and S for Staten Island). (Note: There are some exceptions to this rule, such as the Q35, Q50, M60, or many bus routes operating between Brooklyn and Queens.) Express bus routes to Manhattan generally use a two-letter prefix with an "M" at the end (e.g. an express route from Brooklyn is prefixed BM; from the Bronx, BxM; from Queens, QM; and from Staten Island, SIM). Exceptions to this rule are four Brooklyn express routes operated by New York City Transit using an X prefix, which will be retired under that borough’s redesign. Lettered suffixes can be used to designate branches or variants. The two-letter prefixed express system (BM, BxM and QM) was originated by the former private carriers taken over by MTA Bus.

As of 2018, MTA Regional Bus Operations' budgetary burden for expenditures was $773 million, which it supports through the collection of taxes and fees.

=== Local, Rush, and Limited-Stop Service ===
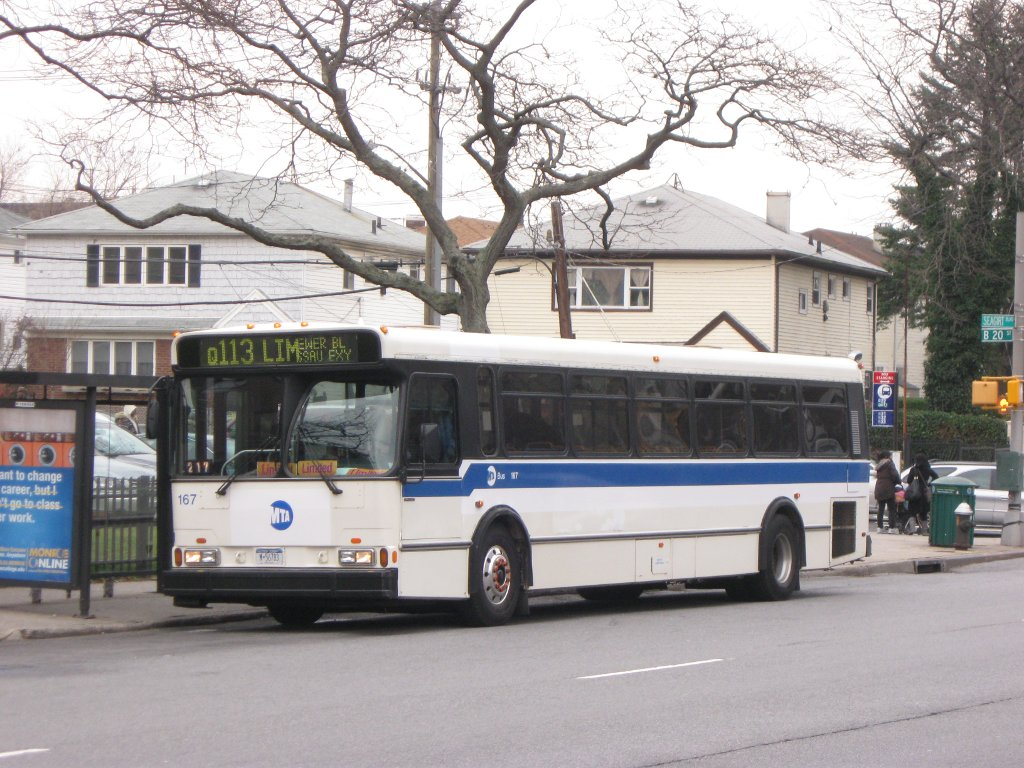
A former Bee-Line Bus System Orion V on the Q113, displaying "LIMITED" on its route sign, with several "Limited" cards on the operator's dashboard. This particular bus was withdrawn from service and scrapped in 2013.

Local and limited-stop buses provide service within a single borough, or in some cases across two. While local buses make all stops along a route, Limited-Stop buses only make stops at busy transfer points, points of interest, and heavily used roadways. Limited-Stop Service was first attempted with the M4 bus during rush hours in 1973, then expanded to other routes from there. The usual setup is that Limited-Stop Service runs the full route, while local services run only in the limited-stop area, and the Limited-Stop buses run local at the tail ends of the route not served by locals, similar to the operation of some subway services and the Staten Island Railway.

Rush buses follow the same principles as both the Local and Limited-Stop buses do, running local and limited-stop along their routes. Rush Service, first introduced in 2025 during the Queens Bus Network Redesign, is a new kind of bus service that combines the features of both Local and Limited-Stop Service into one brand new bus line. Rush buses make more local stops along some segments of the route than they make limited stops on other segments, or vice versa.

There are full-route Limited-Stop buses that run alongside the local variant, making limited stops along the entire route; limited-only buses with no local variants under the same route number; and limited-zone buses, with a semi-limited section (with smaller distances between stops than on regular limited routes) near the route's tail ends, and a non-stop section in the middle.

Rush and Limited-Stop buses flash "RUSH" and "LIMITED" respectively on their destination signs. Occasionally, on the latter buses, a paper orange and purple "Limited" sign will also be placed at the bottom of the windshield by the bus operator in case of false assumptions. Dark navy blue "LOCAL" and red and green "Express" signs also exist.

The following MTA Regional Bus routes run Limited-Stop Service (for non-Staten Island routes, where there is a route numbering system, bold indicates no corresponding local service on the limited-stop route at all, and italic indicates no corresponding local service on the limited-stop route during the daytime):

Borough	Routes	Ref.
The Bronx	Bx1, Bx15, Bx36	
Brooklyn	B6, B35, B38, B41, B49, **B103**	
Manhattan	M1, M2, M4, M5, **M98**, M101	
Queens (Note: None of the Queens limited-stop routes have corresponding local variants with the same route number. In some cases, local routes with different numbers provide local service on parts of the limited-stop route: Local service on the Q50 corridor is provided by the Q25 in Flushing and the Bx23 in Co-op City.; Local service on the Q51 corridor is provided by the Q4 east of Merrick Boulevard and the Q7 on Rockaway Boulevard.; Local service on the Q61 corridor is provided by the Q15, Q25, and Q76.; Local service on the Q74 corridor is provided by the Q30, Q64, Q75 and Q88.; Local service on the Q98 corridor is provided by the Q58 and Q88.; Local service on the Q100 corridor is provided by the Q69.; Local service on the Q113 corridor is provided by the Q111, Q114 and Q115.)	**Q50**, **Q51**, **Q61**, **Q74**, **Q90**, **Q98**, **Q100**, **Q113**	
Staten Island (Note: None of the Staten Island limited-stop routes have corresponding local variants with the same route number. Local routes with different numbers, but with the same last digit (example: S46 and S96), provide local service. The S89 and S93 limited routes partially follow their local counterparts (the S59 and S53 respectively), while other limited routes follow their local counterparts for their entire length.)	**S81, S84, S86, S89, S90, S91, S92, S93, S94, S96, S98**	

The following MTA Regional Bus routes in Queens run Rush service. Some Rush routes were newly implemented in 2025 with the redesigned Queens Bus Network, or were split off from other routes (e.g. the Q48). Other Rush routes were originally either local bus routes (e.g. the Q2), or had both limited and local service (e.g. the Q4).

Borough	Routes	Ref.
Queens	Q2, Q4, Q9, Q10, Q13, Q27, Q28, Q30, Q35, Q36, Q40, Q43, Q46, Q48, Q63, Q75, Q77, Q82, Q84, Q85, Q86, Q87, Q89, Q111, Q114	

=== Select Bus Service ===
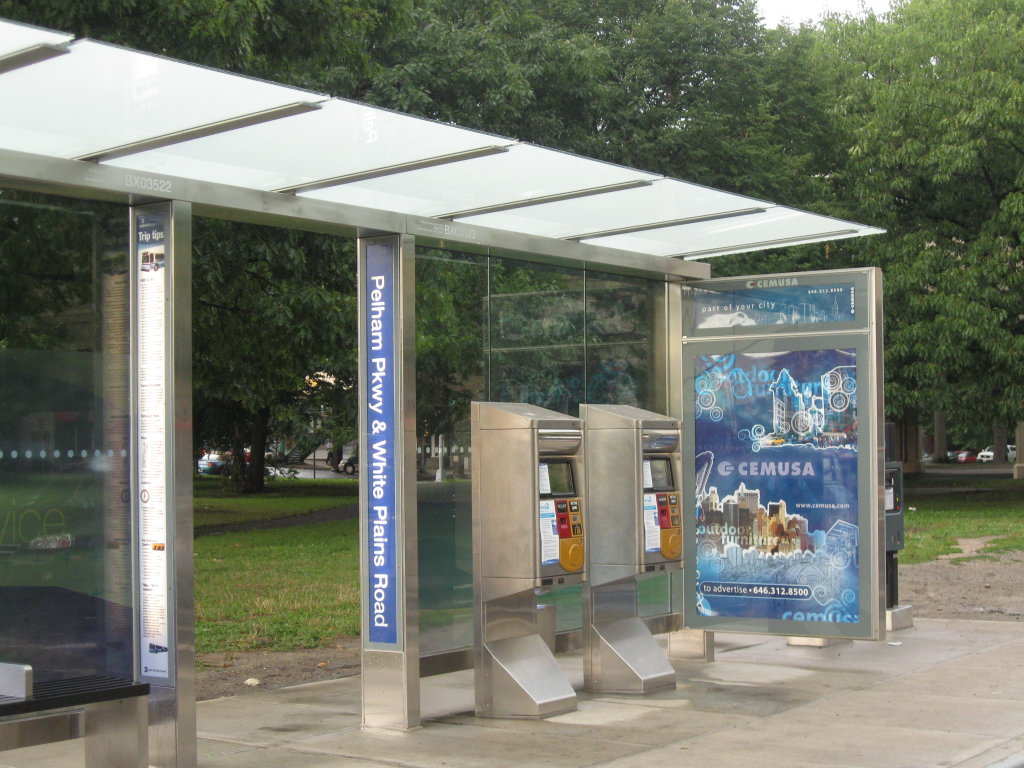
A Select Bus Service fare payment center.

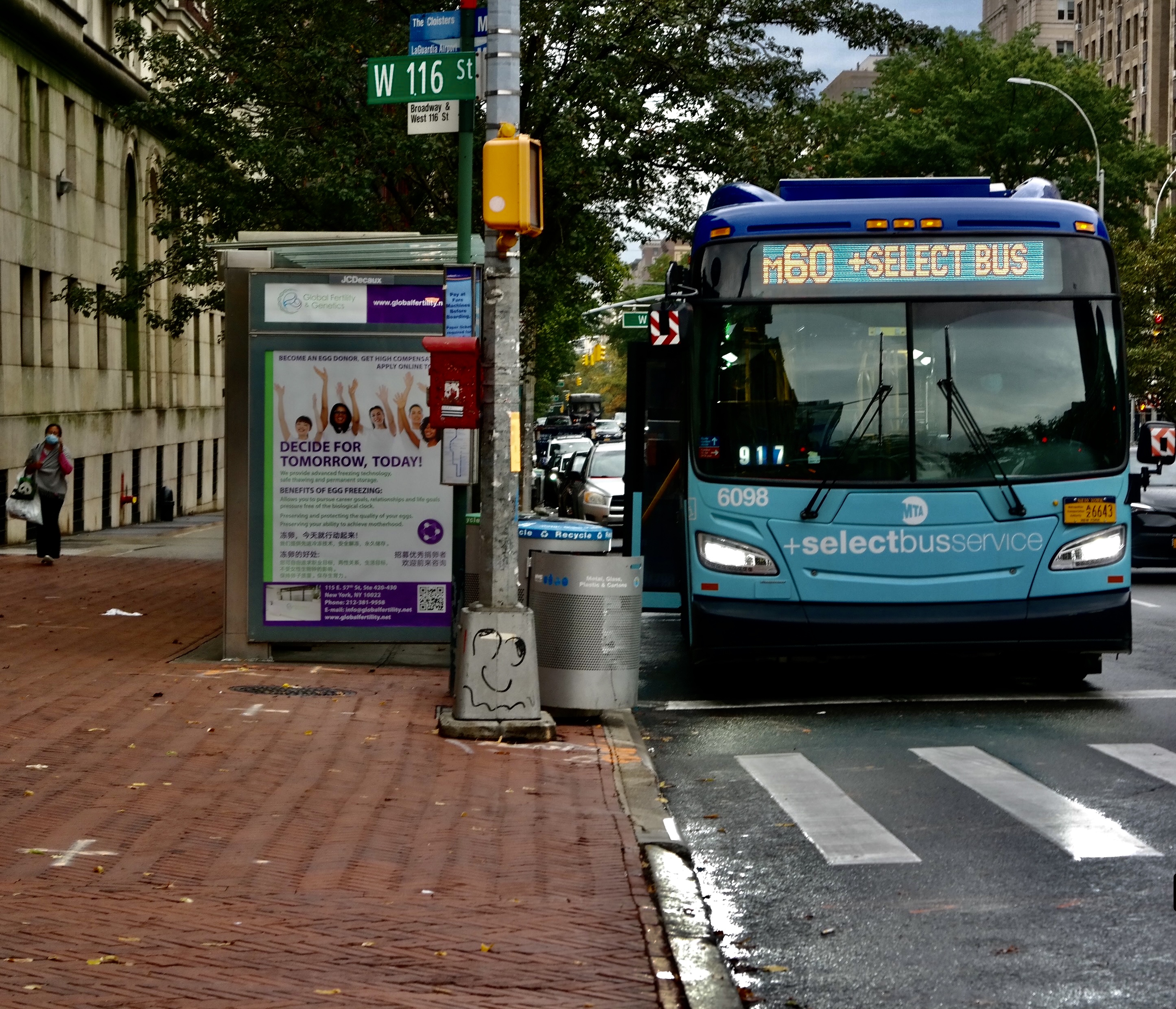
Select Bus Service bus #6098 operating on the M60 SBS service through Morningside Heights

Select Bus Service (SBS), the brand name for MTA bus rapid transit service, is a variant of Limited-Stop bus service that requires fare payment to be made before boarding the bus, at fare payment machines in shelters at designated "stations" (such a shelter is shown to the right). Receipts given for payment of fare are "proof-of-payment" that must be shown to the MTA's fare inspectors upon request. In the event of the fare machine failing to issue a receipt, the bus operator must be notified of the problem. The implementation of this new service is paired with new lane markings and traffic signs that reserve a lane for buses only during the daytime.

The first Select Bus Service corridor, on the Bx12 along 207th Street, Fordham Road, and Pelham Parkway, was placed into service on June 29, 2008. The next line, the M15, saw Select Service begin on October 10, 2010 after the delivery of new low-floor buses. The M34/M34A line was started on November 13, 2011. Initially, a 34th Street busway was planned that would require eliminating 34th Street as a through street, but it was dropped in favor of the standard SBS model.

The B44 Rogers/Bedford/Nostrand Avenues bus route, the fifth Select Bus Service corridor in the city, was implemented on November 17, 2013 after the arrival of new fare machines. The S79 Hylan Boulevard/Richmond Avenue route, initially slated to be converted to SBS in 2013, was moved up to September 2, 2012; the local equivalents of the S79 route are the S78 and S59 buses.

A sixth corridor, the second for the Bronx, began service on the Bx41 Webster Avenue route on June 30, 2013; this route was the first "Phase II" SBS route to begin service (the existing corridors plus the B44 comprise Phase I). Another Select Bus Service route on Webster Avenue, which will be extended to run between LaGuardia Airport and Fordham Plaza alongside the local Bx41 route, is proposed for later implementation.

A seventh corridor, and the third for Manhattan, the M60 125th Street–Triborough Bridge–Astoria Boulevard bus route to LaGuardia Airport, was converted to SBS on May 25, 2014; local service was replaced by other routes running alongside the route of the M60 (the M100, M101, Bx15, and Q19). An eighth Select Bus Service route was planned in the 2014–2017 Financial Plan. The eighth Select Bus Service corridor (ninth route overall), and the fourth in Manhattan, was for the M86 running on 86th Street, which was originally scheduled to start running on June 28, 2015, but pushed back to July 13, 2015; it did not include a major change in stops.

The ninth corridor, and the second for Brooklyn, is the B46 on Utica Avenue. When implemented, the local and Select Bus Service route of the B46 changed northern terminals to improve reliability. Originally planned for implementation in fall 2015, it was instituted on July 3, 2016. The tenth corridor, and the first for Queens, is the Q44 limited bus route running on East 177th Street (the Cross Bronx Expressway service road) and Main Street, which began on November 29, 2015. Selected stops in the Bronx were combined into much busier stops for faster service, and some stops in Queens have been replaced by the Q20A/B local routes. As both the Q20 branches do not enter the Bronx and the Q44 ran local late nights only, the Q44 gained 24/7 SBS service between the Bronx Zoo and Jamaica. The Q20A replaced the Q44 local in Queens late nights.

In September 2016, the eleventh corridor (twelfth route overall) and the second for Queens, the Q70, was rebranded as the "LaGuardia Link" and became a SBS route. As opposed to other SBS routes, the Q70 is wrapped in a light blue scheme with clouds and airplanes in order to encourage more people to use public transportation when using the airport. This marked MTA Bus's first SBS route, as well as the second for Queens and the eleventh overall. The M23, the twelfth corridor (thirteenth route) and the fifth in Manhattan, became a Select Bus Service route on November 6, 2016 with dedicated bus lanes and countdown clocks at some stops, replacing M23 local service at the cost of $1.7 million.

The M79 became an SBS route in May 2017, with the installation of bus lanes along its route. The Bx6, after the completion of bus lanes and widened sidewalks, became an SBS route in September 2017. It supplements the local service by stopping at high ridership stops. This is the third route for the Bronx. Select Bus Service along Woodhaven and Cross Bay Boulevards was implemented on the Q52 and Q53 routes in November 2017.

Select Bus Service along Kings Highway was implemented on the B82, which replaced the former Limited-Stop route, on October 1, 2018. The city subsequently announced that following the implementation of the B82 SBS, it would halt the implementation of Select Bus Service in the outer boroughs until 2021 as a result of budget cuts, and an upcoming redesign of the city's bus network.

A temporary M14 Select Bus Service route was proposed for implementation in early 2019, in preparation for the 14th Street Tunnel shutdown. This route would have run between Tenth Avenue and Stuyvesant Cove Ferry, with local service on the M14A and M14D. Five additional temporary routes would have been implemented for the shutdown in April 2019. However, on January 3, 2019, the shutdown plan was altered by Governor Andrew Cuomo and the proposed SBS routes were put on hold. In February 2019, the MTA announced plans to implement SBS on the M14A and M14D, and has since been implemented on July 1, 2019.

All current SBS corridors are enforced by cameras restricting non-buses in these lanes on weekdays where the bus lane is curbside, with the bus lanes marked by red paint. Where the bus lane is an offset lane (that is, one lane away from the curb), non-bus traffic is restricted at all times except for emergencies.

Buses used in this service are identifiable with "stations" equipped with ticket machines, and most of them also have a "+selectbusservice" wrap identifying them as such buses. Locations of stops (and in some cases, the local bus stops) were shifted or eliminated where possible to prevent mixing of local bus customers. SBS is offered in conjunction with the NYC DOT and NYS DOT.

=== Express service ===
Express bus service is generally geared towards peak hour commuters from the outer boroughs and neighboring suburbs that lack rail or subway services to and from Midtown Manhattan or Lower Manhattan. Some routes also provide significant off-peak service from early morning to late evening, every day. Routes with daily off-peak service include the BxM1/2, BxM3, BxM4, BxM6, BxM7, BxM8, BxM9, BxM10, BxM11, QM2, QM4, QM5/6, SIM3c, SIM4c, SIM33c, X27 and X28; the SIM1c runs 24 hours a day. 45-foot MCI and Prevost over-the-road coaches are used for express service.

Service originally began on November 3, 1965, on route R8X (later X8, now SIM5) traveling from the South Shore of Staten Island, up Hylan Blvd and Father Capodanno Blvd., into Downtown Brooklyn. In the 1980s, the R8X was renumbered and rerouted from Brooklyn to its current terminal in Lower Manhattan.

=== Access-A-Ride ===
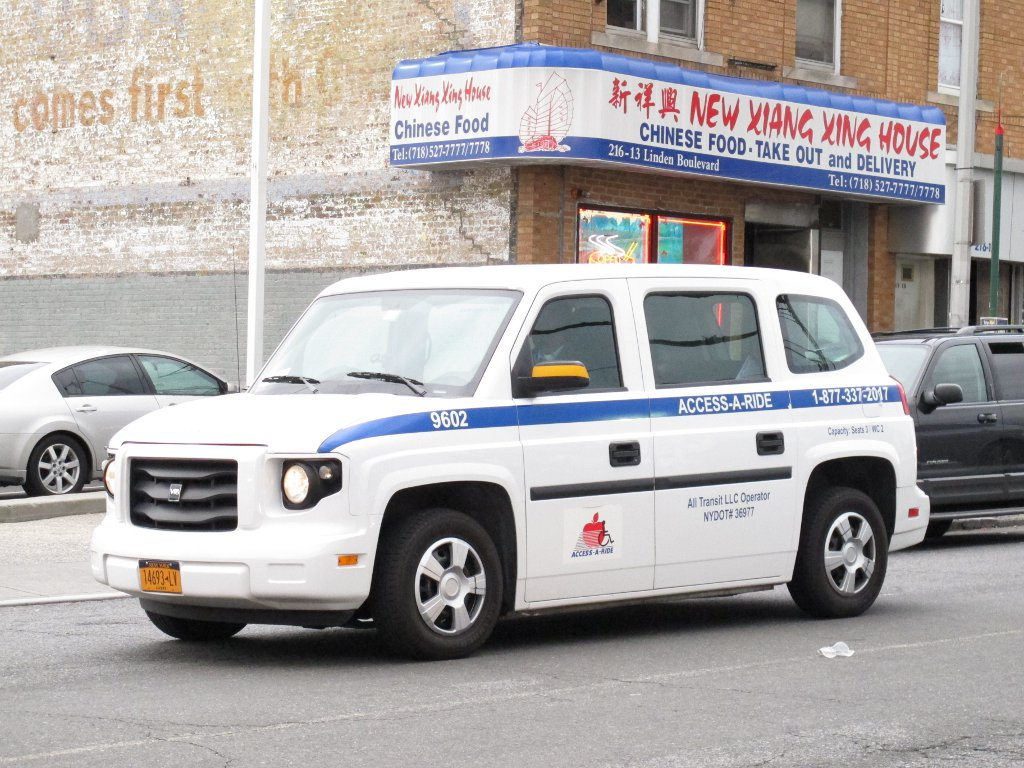
An MV-1 Access-A-Ride cab

In addition to a 100% accessible bus fleet, New York City Transit provides paratransit services under the Americans with Disabilities Act (ADA) of 1990 under the Access-A-Ride brand, for customers who cannot use regular bus or subway service. It services all five boroughs of New York City at all times. The Access-A-Ride paratransit services are provided by various independent contractors, mostly using vehicles owned by the MTA, with some exceptions. Although all buses are wheelchair-accessible, these vehicles provide an accessible transport option for MTA riders. The program was created in 1991 after the passage of the Americans with Disabilities Act of 1990.

== Bus stops ==
Within a service area, bus stops are normally located every two to three city blocks apart; specific guidelines dictate that stops should be placed every 750 feet (230 m). Buses marked Limited-Stop, Select Bus Service, and Express have fewer stops. Stops are located curbside, usually at street intersections, identified by blue signage and shelters. Buses stop either on concrete pads, or designated bus lanes (maroon-red if painted). Some bus stops, particularly along Select Bus Service routes, are designed as bus bulbs.

All bus stops are in effect at all times unless otherwise indicated by signage.

=== Signage ===
B44 Select Bus Service bus stop in Brooklyn

Bus stops in New York City are identified by two types of signs:

- An older-style, simple rectangular metal sign, similar to other street signs in the city.
- A newer, color-coded sign showing both route and destination.

Queens buses that run along the border with Nassau County (Q36, Q46, QM6) or within Nassau County (Q111, Q113, Q114) will sometimes share former MTA Long Island Bus-style signage with Nassau Inter-County Express bus service, though many stops on the Q111, Q113, and Q114 routes in Nassau County are either unsigned, or simply signed as "No Stopping Bus Stop". These signs are also made of metal.

The newer signs, used on all New York City Bus-branded routes, were in place by the mid-2000s, while old-style bus stop signs still exist on many MTA Bus-branded routes, showing only the route and not the destination. All bus stop signs within the city borders are maintained by New York City Department of Transportation. The newer signs are made of recyclable ABS plastic that last up to ten years and are easier to maintain than the old metal signs, which last about three years on average. The green plastic pole stands from 12 feet (3.7 m) to 20 feet (6.1 m) high, versus the old 6-to-9-foot-high (1.8 to 2.7 m) metal signs. Both old and new-style stops carry a Guide-A-Ride box that is attached to the center of the pole, providing route maps, schedules and other information. Guide-A-Ride boxes were installed on all NYCT routes by the 1980s. Implementation on MTA Bus Company routes took place in the 2000s for express buses, and in 2012–2014 for local bus routes.

==== Older signs ====
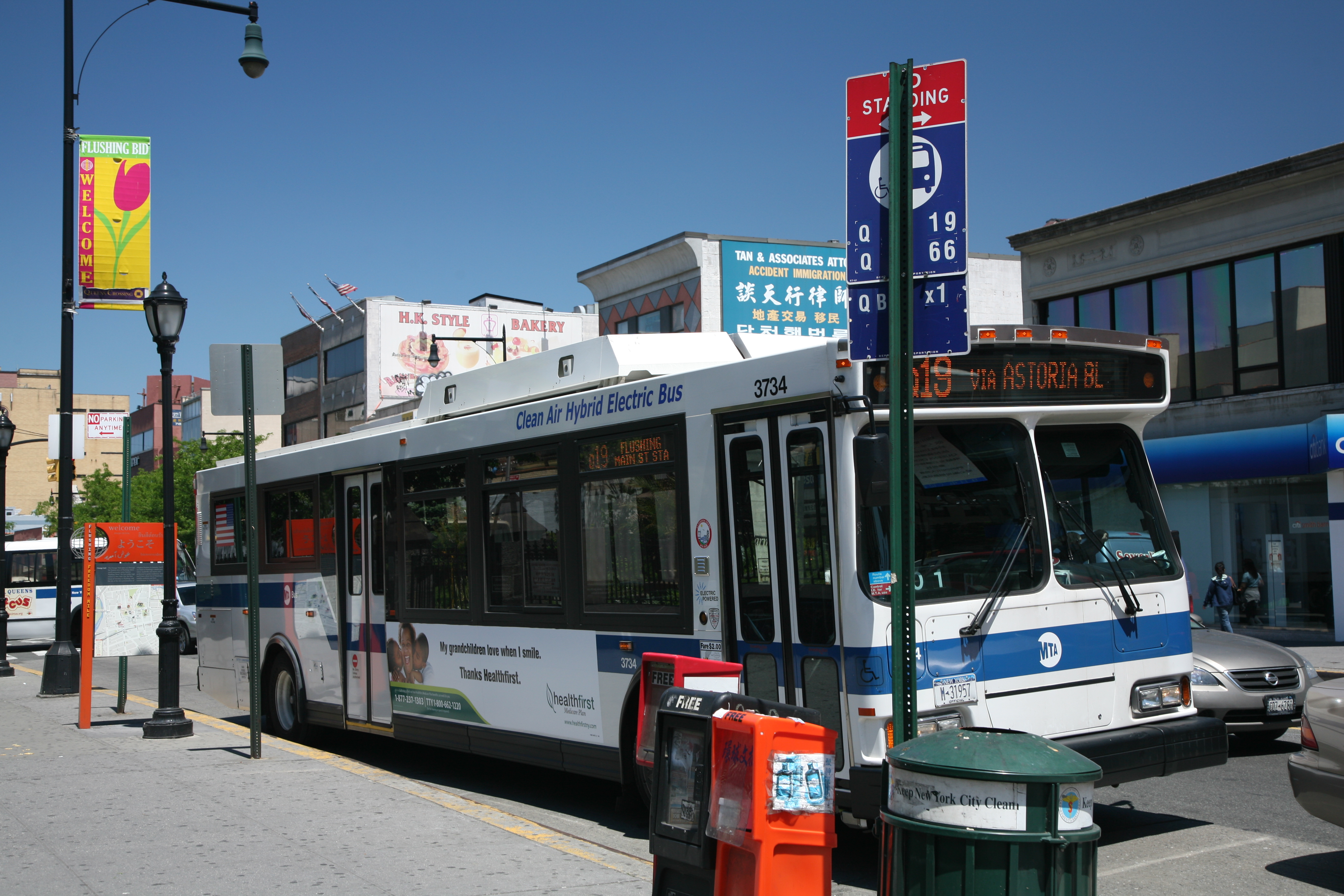
A Q19 bus at an old-style bus stop, showing only the routes served, in Downtown Flushing, Queens.

The first metal signs in the city to feature a pictograph of a bus were installed by the Transit Authority in the 1960s. Metal signs in their current design, which are mainly used on MTA Bus-operated routes and at temporary construction-regulation bus stops, were first used in 1976, as part of a pilot program on Fifth and Sixth Avenues in Midtown Manhattan funded by the Urban Mass Transit Administration, and fully implemented in the 1980s.

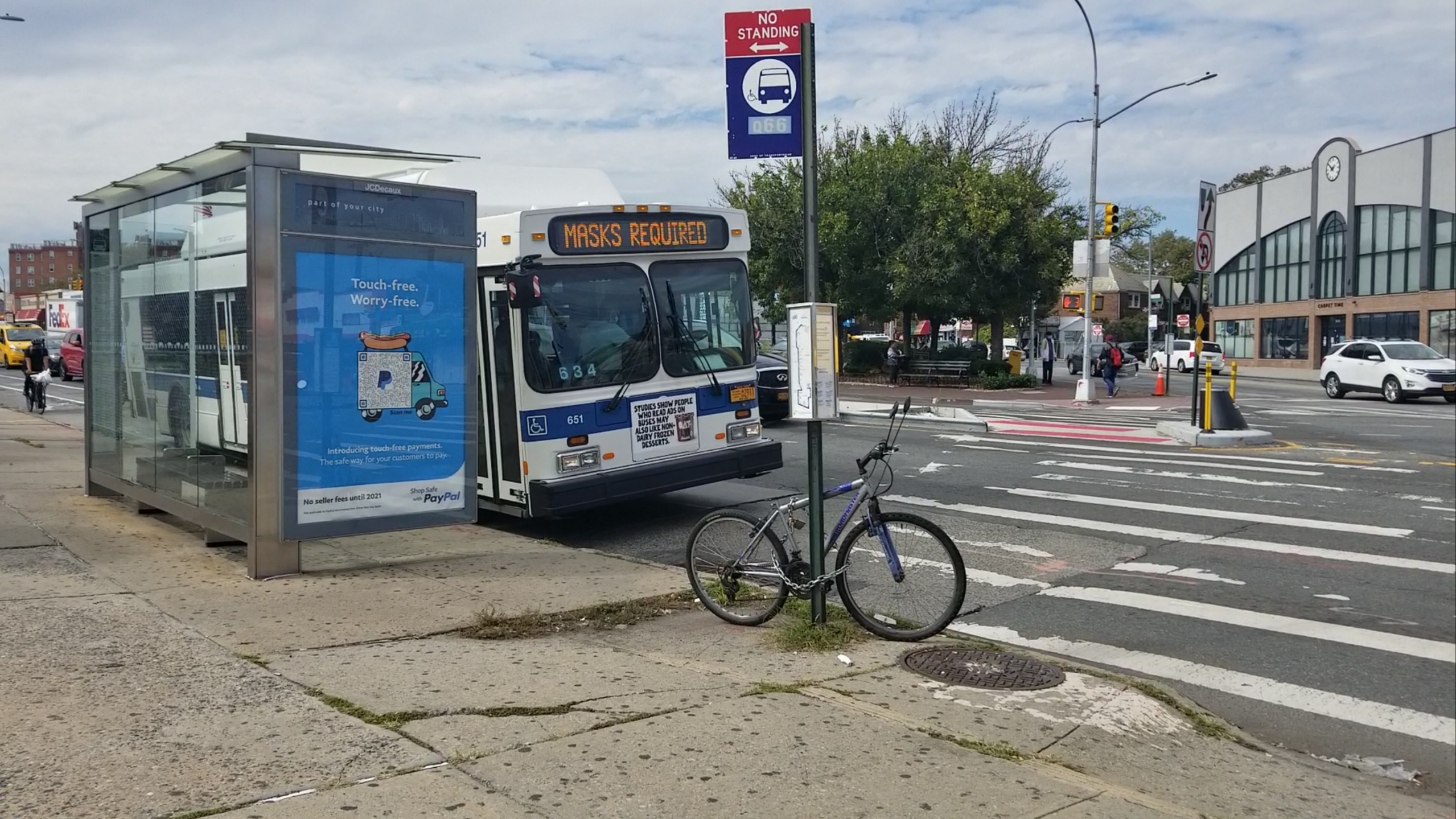
A Q66 bus at an updated old-style bus stop with the timetable box, in Woodside, Queens

In its current iteration, the upper portion of the sign is red, reading "NO STANDING" with an arrow identifying the no standing zone. Below on a blue background is a white circle, with a blue pictograph of a bus and wheelchair from the International Symbol of Access. Routes are identified with color-coded labels (see below), but without destinations. Some signs for express-bus service are colored lime-green and read "EXPRESS" at the top. Due to MTA Bus Time coming out, most old-style stops received a timetable box indicating the bus route's map, expected time arrivals, and a code to use on the website or app.

==== Newer signs ====
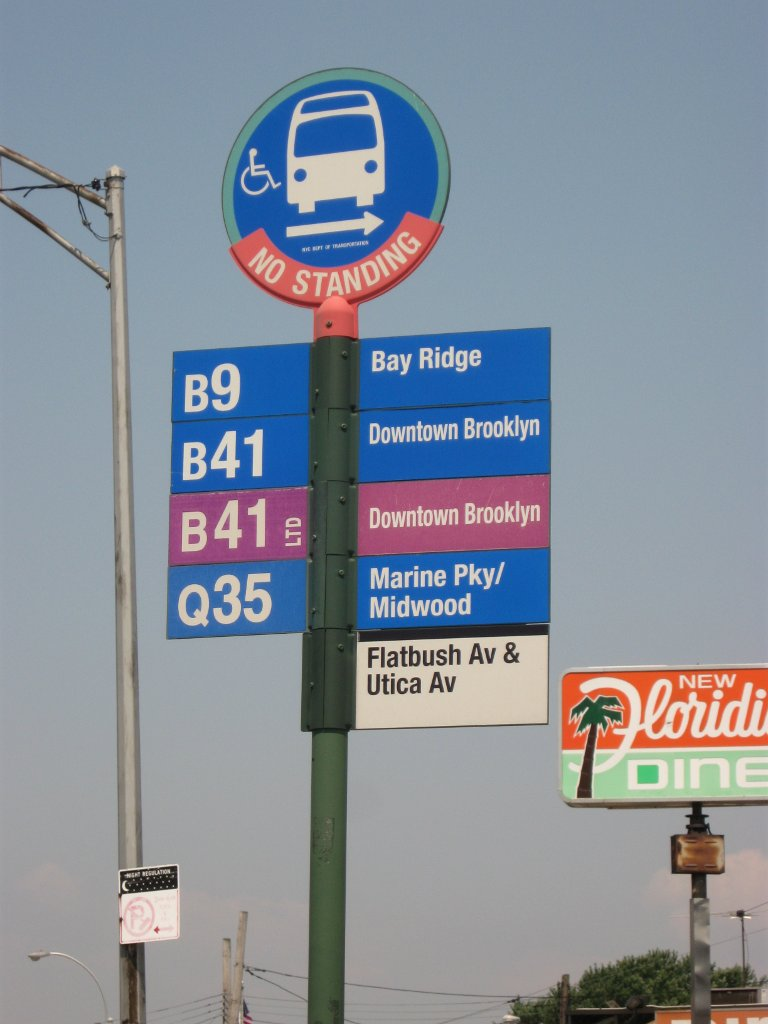
A newer bus stop at Flatbush Avenue and Utica Avenue in Brooklyn, showing both the routes served and the destination

The modern color-coded lollipop-shaped bus stop signs, which are used at all bus stops on New York City Bus-operated routes as well as at bus stops shared with MTA Bus routes and other companies, were first installed in November 1996 in Jamaica, Queens. They were designed by W.S. Sign Design Corporation. The signs were created following two federal grants given to the MTA and DOT in 1994 totaling $1.5 million, in response to complaints from bus riders that the previous metal signs lacked basic information about bus routes and schedules, and that some signs were often missing entirely. They were based on signs used in London and Paris that had existed since at least the 1950s.

The initial program called for the installation of 3,000 signs, of which 2,600 would be in Manhattan, and the remainder in the other boroughs. Initially, prototype signs were installed at selected locations, and then 400 signs started to be installed in December 1996, before being completed in April 1997, with the remaining signs installed by the end of 1997. The signs in Manhattan were installed using the $1 million USDOT grant, while the $500,000 from the Congestion Mitigation Air Quality grant was used for signs in the outer boroughs. The signs were placed at high-ridership bus stops that could not have bus shelters and locations where their durability could be properly tested. If the test was successful, it was expected that a full citywide installation would take six years.

The signs are in violation of the New York State Vehicle and Traffic Law, Section 1680. The law requires all "traffic control devices" to comply with the U.S. Manual of Uniform Traffic Control Devices (MUTCD) as modified by the NYS Supplement, and mandates that parking signs must be rectangular rather than circular.

The new bus stop sign features a large circle on top and rectangular color-coded bus route information on the bottom. The bus stop circle also has a pictograph of a bus and ADA wheelchair, in white on a blue background. Hanging off the pole below are rectangular bus route signs, color-coded by type of service. Each has a route number and final destination, usually the neighborhood in which it terminates, though a street or landmark is listed for some routes. Westbound Bx12 local signs, for example, read "Sedgwick Avenue" instead of the neighborhood University Heights.

At the bottom of this area is a white rectangle with black text announcing the name of the stop, usually the names of the streets at the intersection. On bus stops that operate at all times of day, an arrow and red text on the bottom of the upper circle indicates the no-standing zone for cars. On stops that only operate part-time, the top route number box will read "NO STANDING", with the top destination box listing the days and/or times of day this is in effect. Some bus routes that run underneath elevated subway lines (such as the Bx9 underneath the Broadway elevated in the Bronx) use metal bus stop signs with a printed image depicting a modern bus sign, affixed to the pillars of the El.

==== Electronic countdown clocks ====
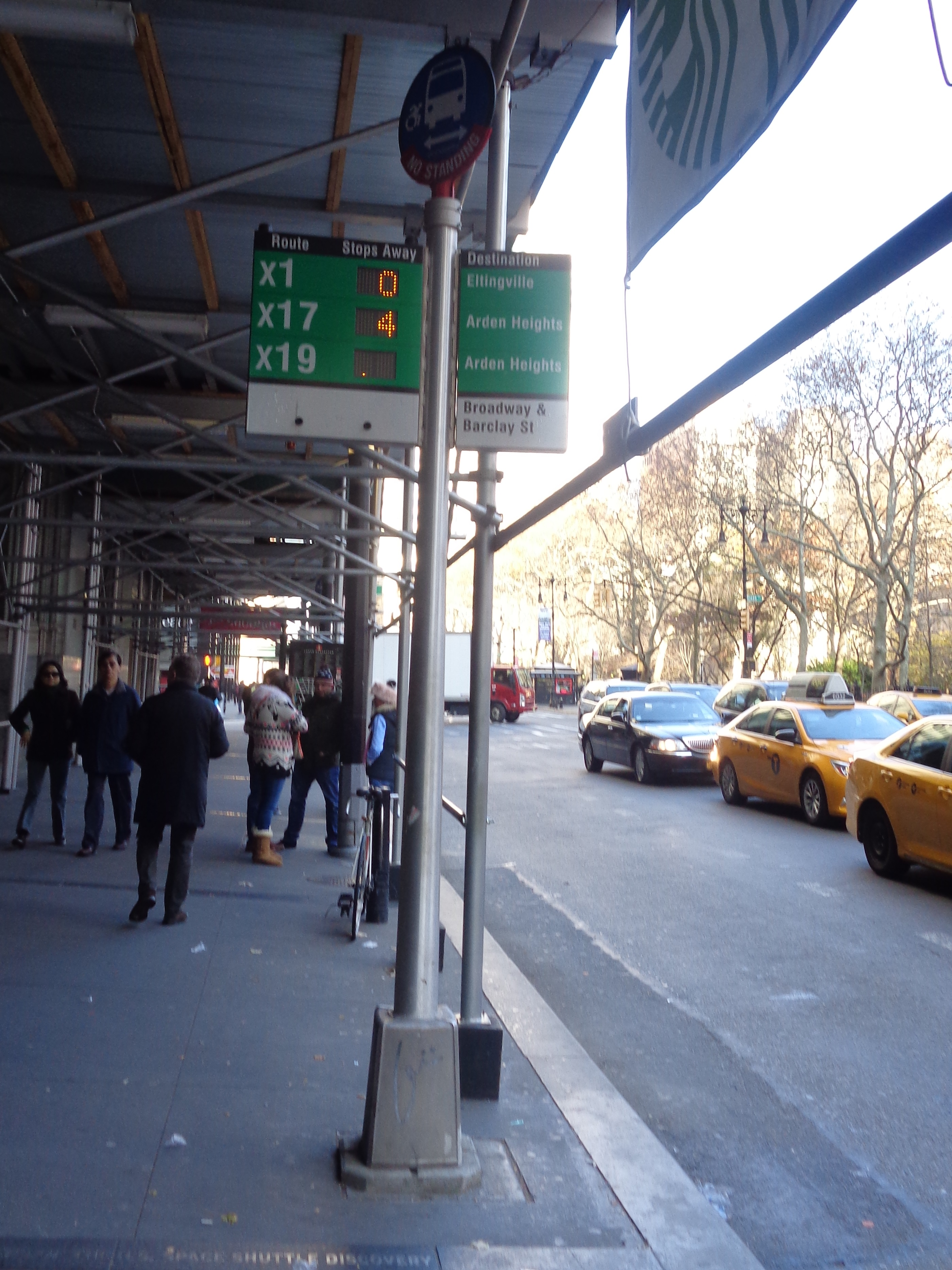
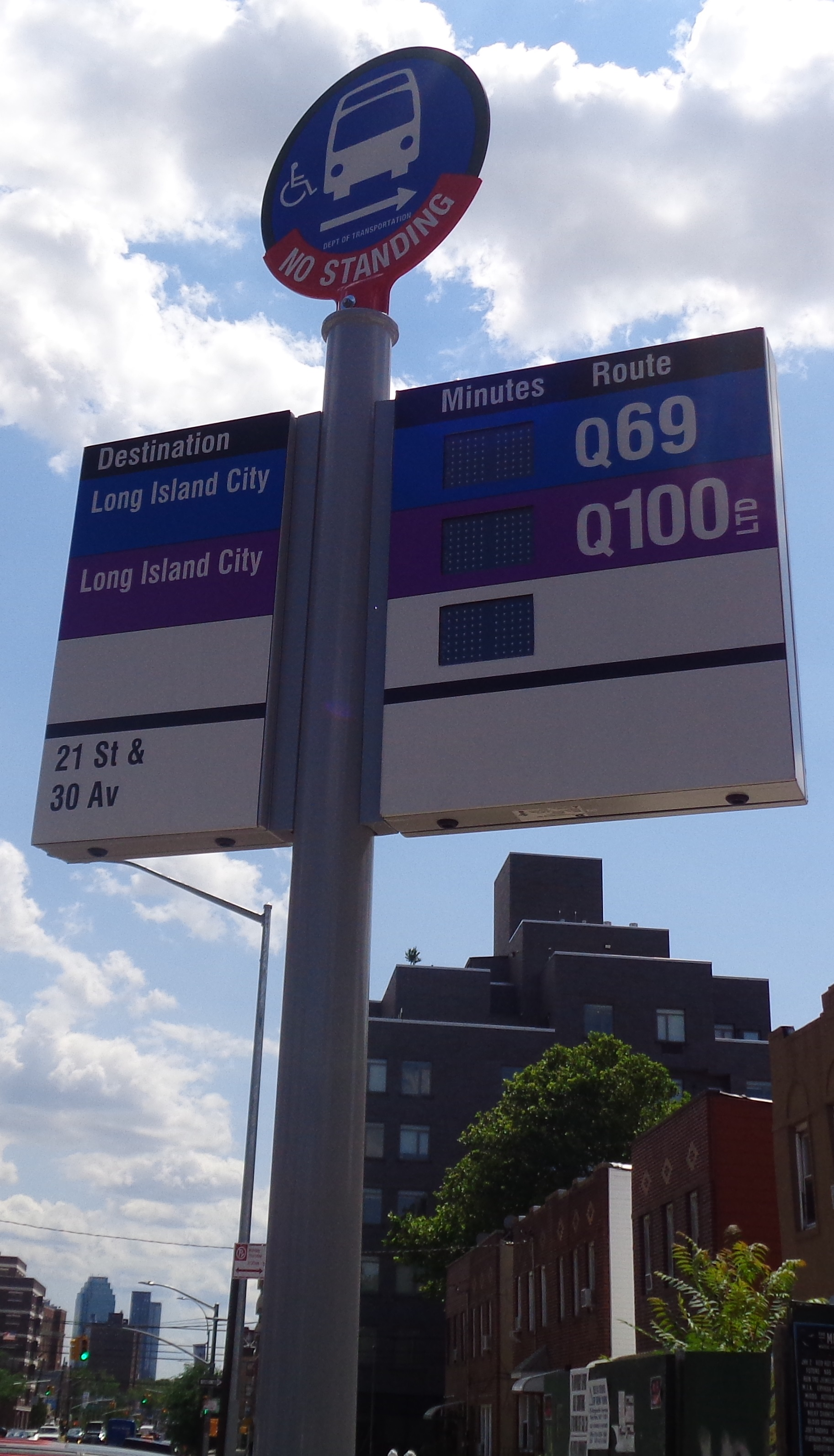
A countdown clock for Staten Island express routes near City Hall (left), and for the Q69 and Q100 buses in Astoria, Queens (right). The sign on the left displays "Stops Away", while the one on the right displays "Minutes Away".

Some bus stops, produced by Data Display and STV Incorporated, feature electronic countdown clocks. In addition to the route and destination, an LED readout in between displays how many stops away or minutes away the next bus is using the MTA's "Bus Time" system. The first two signs of this kind, in Stapleton and New Dorp on Staten Island, were installed in 2013. The Stapleton stop is solar-powered. A third stop was installed near City Hall in Manhattan in 2015. An additional 18 stops in Staten Island and Brooklyn were approved for installation in late 2014, 10 for Queens in 2015, and 100 in Staten Island in 2016, as part of the NYCDOT's plan to install around 350 across the city. In 2018, as part of its Bus Action Plan, the MTA announced that more signs would receive electronic countdown clocks.

Several stops along Select Bus Service routes employ different countdown clocks that are separate from bus stop signage. These clocks are part of wayfinding information kiosks installed in conjunction with the city's WalkNYC project beginning in 2013. As of 2016, a total of 32 bus stops had one of the two countdown clocks installed; the technology had been expanded to more than 500 bus stops by 2019. The current countdown clocks are successors to a pilot program on the M15 in 2007, and another on the M34 and M16 buses between 2009 and 2012.

In 2025, the MTA began piloting battery-powered countdown clocks at four bus stops in Manhattan and Queens. These devices are smaller than either of the existing countdown clocks and are mounted on existing bus-stop poles. In 2026, the city government announced plans to install 1,400 additional countdown clocks, doubling the number of countdown clocks in the city, within four years.

==== Sign colors ====
The signage for routes at bus stops may be given different colors depending on the types of services available at each stop.

Sign color	Type of service
Blue	MTA local bus service.; Bee-Line local bus stops; Pick-up only except along Broadway above West 242nd Street, White Plains Rd Between E. 241st Street and W. 1st Street (Mt. Vernon City Line), Boston Road, Fordham Road, Mundy Lane, and through Pelham Bay Park in the Bronx, where there are pickup and drop-off.; NICE local bus stops within New York City limits; Pick-up only outbound, drop-off only inbound in Queens, except in Far Rockaway, Queens, along Jamaica Avenue west of 239th Street and Hook Creek Boulevard.; B110 express service in Brooklyn (privately operated).; Some stops are labeled as blue while others are labeled as green; Some MTA Bus-operated local bus stops are light blue.
Purple	MTA Limited-Stop bus service or New RUSH service as part of the Queens Bus Redesign.; Some MTA Bus-operated limited bus stops are light purple.
Green	MTA express bus service, (pick-up only to Manhattan, drop-off only from Manhattan).; B110 express service in Brooklyn (privately operated).; Some stops are labeled as blue while others are labeled as green; Some MTA Bus-operated express bus stops are light green.
Turquoise	MTA Select Bus Service.; Bus stops generally have several individual light blue and dark blue wavy stripes, juxtaposed with the background gradient. Newer routes have yellow stripes as well.
Turquoise & blue	MTA Select Bus Service.; Bus stops generally have several individual light blue and dark blue wavy stripes, juxtaposed with the background gradient. Newer routes have yellow stripes as well.
Black	Service operates late nights only.
Yellow	Special school service (stopping at that stop only when New York City public schools are in session).
White	Private, tour, commuter and long-distance bus company bus stop.

=== Shelters and street furniture ===
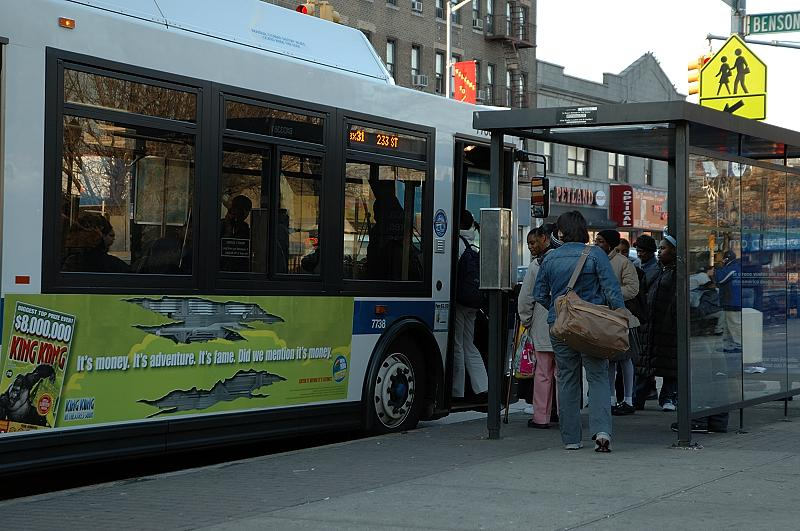
An old-style, black-frame bus shelter in the Bronx.

The current bus shelters found at many bus stops were designed by Spain-based advertising company Cemusa, as part of a citywide "street furniture" project that also included newsstands, bike shelters, and public toilets. Cemusa was awarded a 20-year contract for 3,300 bus shelters in May 2006, after the project had been receiving design bids going back to the 1990s. As opposed to the city paying Cemusa to install the shelters, the company paid for exclusive rights to advertise on the shelters; in return, the company would share a portion of the ad revenue generated. They replaced the simple old-style shelters, consisting of black-painted metal with glass. The first 24 shelters were installed by December 2006 in Queens.

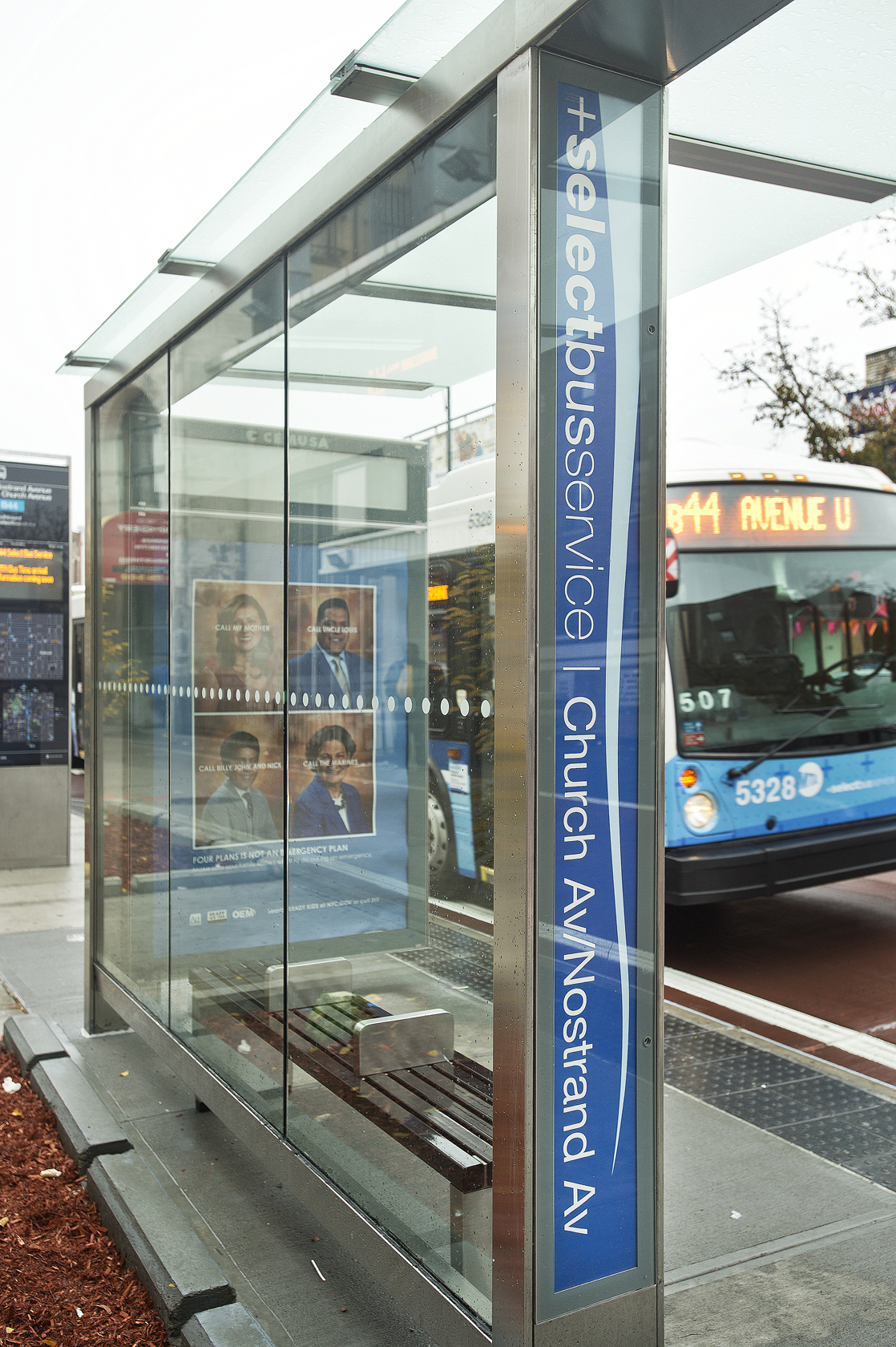
A newer, steel-and-glass-frame Cemusa shelter on the B44 SBS route in Brooklyn.

Designed by British architect Nicholas Grimshaw and his firm Grimshaw Architects, the shelters are constructed of stainless steel, with glass on three sides including the roof and rear. The fourth side consists of an advertising panel. On the non-advertising panel is an insert listing the streets of the intersection where the stop is located on the outer side, and route maps and information also featured on the Guide-A-Ride on its inner face.

The shelters come in five sizes (Regular: 5 by 14 feet (1.5 m × 4.3 m); Narrow: 3.5 by 14 feet (1.1 m × 4.3 m); Short: 5 by 10 feet (1.5 m × 3.0 m); Little: 3.5 by 10 feet (1.1 m × 3.0 m); and Double: 5 by 26 feet (1.5 m × 7.9 m)). All the modern shelters feature benches (many of the old ones did not), and were praised for environmentally friendly construction during their introduction. Several of these shelters, primarily in Manhattan, have since been equipped with LED displays, LCD video advertisement panels, and ad panels with NFC communication technology. Following the acquisition of Cemusa by French advertising firm JCDecaux in 2015, bus shelters are now maintained by JCDecaux.

Bus stops with shelters or nearby trees tend to be cooler than bus stops with neither shelters nor trees. A 2024 study found that some of the hottest bus stops in the city, which lacked both shelters and trees, were located in Queens and the Bronx.

In 2025, as part of a $40 million project, the New York City Department of Transportation announced plans to install seated and standing benches at 8,750 bus stops citywide over the next decade. At the time, only about 5,000 bus stops (one-third of the citywide total) had benches, including as part of shelters. Standing benches would be installed where the installation of seated benches was not feasible.

=== Late-night Request-A-Stop ===
Between 10:00 p.m. and 5:00 a.m., "Request-a-Stop" service is available as dictated by NYCDOT traffic regulations. If requested by a passenger, the bus operator may discharge passengers at a location along the route that is not a bus stop, as long as it is considered safe. If the location is not "safe" (i.e. it will interfere with traffic flow), the bus operator will discharge passengers at the nearest safe location. Request-A-Stop is not available on Select Bus Service, Non-stop sections of express routes, Limited-Stop routes, Rush sections on rush routes, or overnight bus shuttles. Request-A-Stop was inaugurated on December 5, 1993, in Staten Island, and expanded to other boroughs in 1994.

== Fleet ==
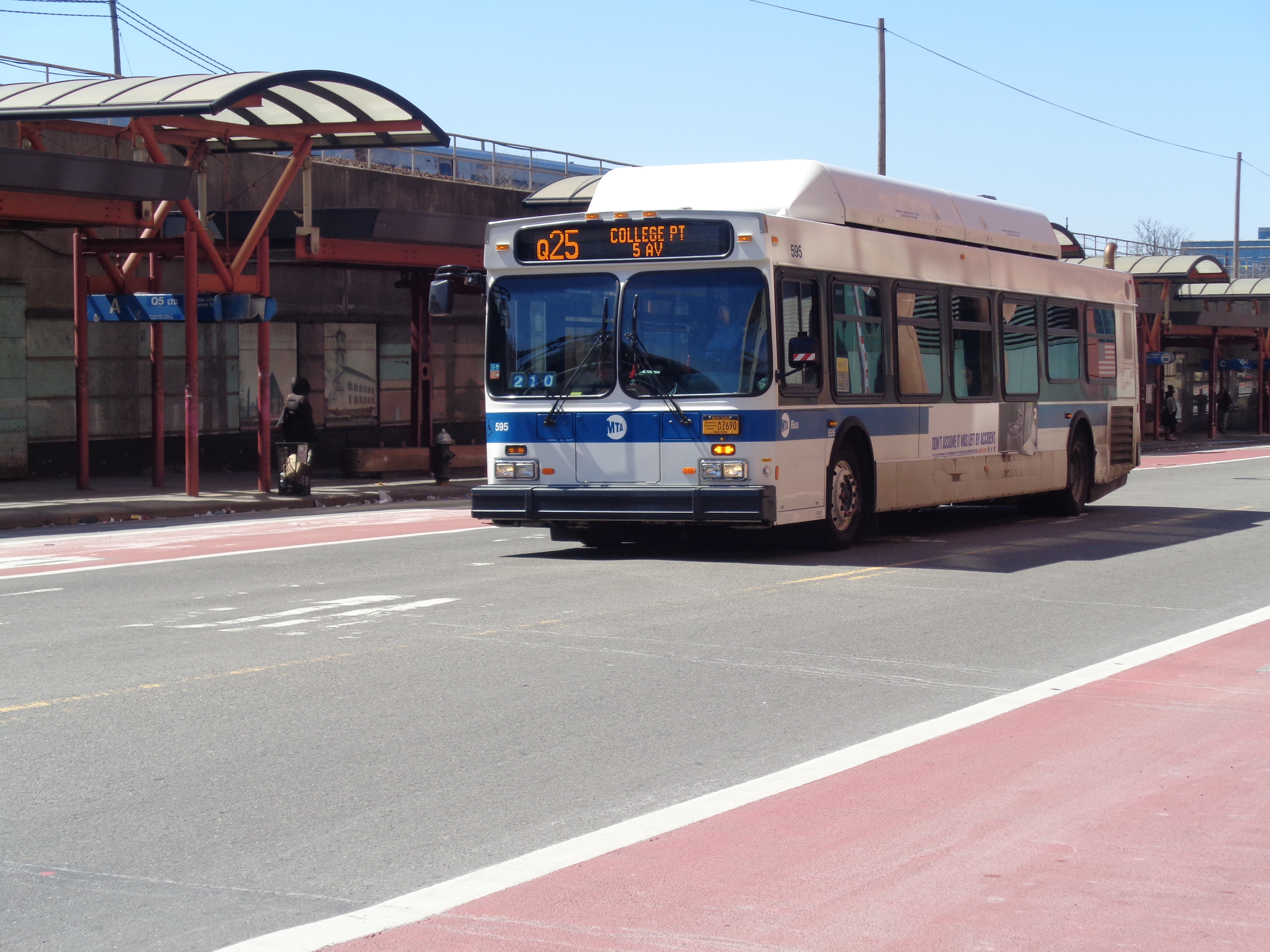
A Q25 CNG bus outside Jamaica Center – Parsons/Archer

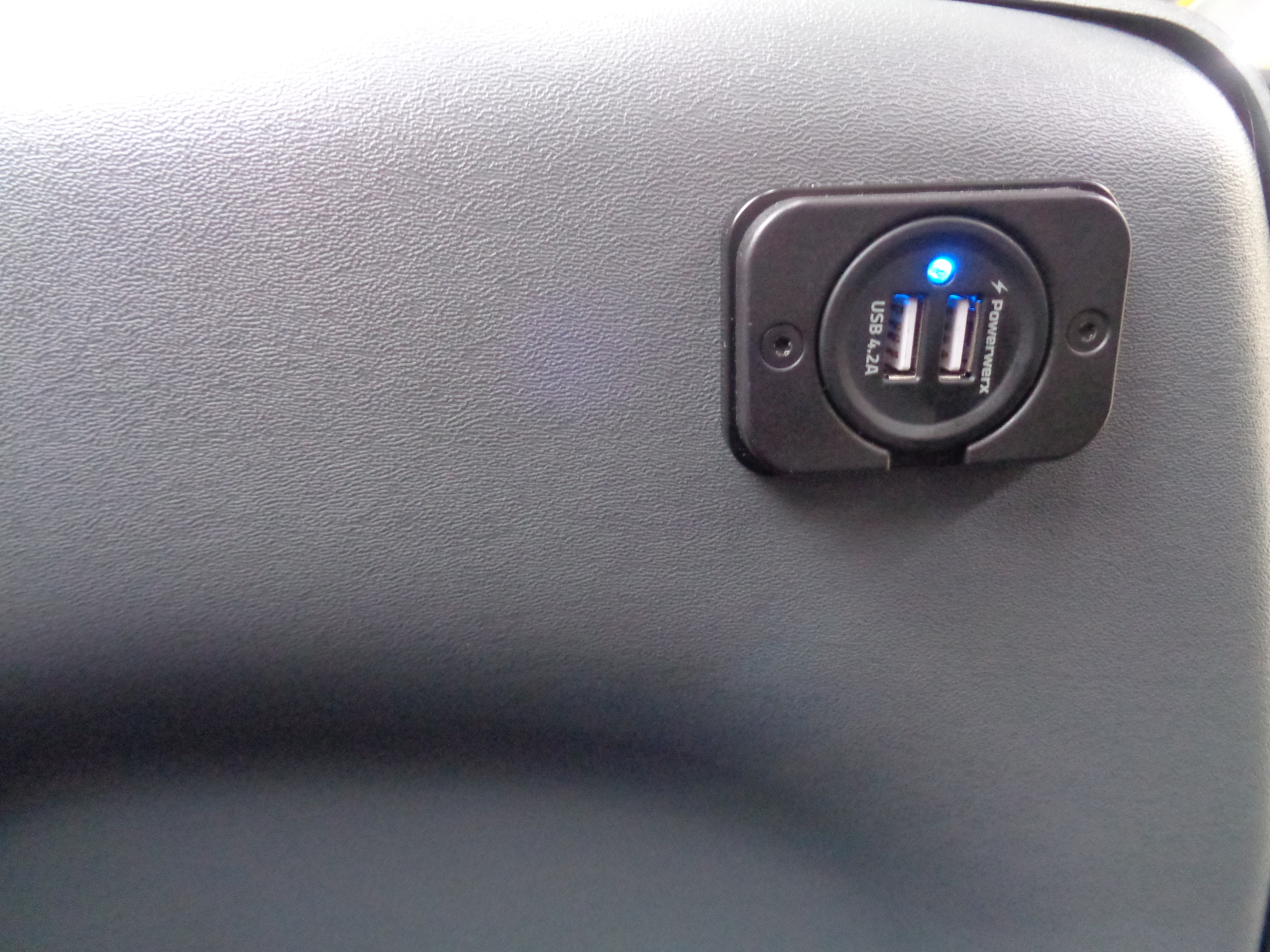
A USB charging port in a bus introduced in 2016.

The fleet consists of over 5,800 buses of various types and models for fixed-route service, making MTA RBO's fleet the largest public bus fleet in the United States. The MTA also has over 2,000 vans and cabs for ADA paratransit service, providing service in New York City, southwestern Nassau County, and the city of Yonkers. All vehicles (except for paratransit cabs) are fully accessible to persons with disabilities. Fixed-route buses are dispatched from 27 garages (19 New York City Bus and 8 MTA Bus).

Several fleet improvements have been introduced over the system's history. The first large order of air conditioned buses began service in 1966. "Kneeling buses" were introduced in 1976, and wheelchair lifts began appearing in 1980. Also in the 1980s, stop-request cords ("bell cords") were replaced by yellow tape strips. However, buses ordered after 2008 feature cords rather than tape strips due to the latter's higher maintenance cost. Articulated buses were introduced in 1996, and have since become prominent in the Bronx and Manhattan.

Low-floor buses, designed to speed boarding and alighting and improve riding conditions for elderly and disabled passengers, were first tested in 1997 and made up most of the new non-express buses ordered since the early 2000s. The last non-express high-floor bus was withdrawn in 2019. Most post-2000 orders also feature stop-request buttons located on grab bars. Since 2016, buses built after 2011 have been built or retrofitted with Wi-Fi connectivity and USB charging ports.

Starting in 2016, efforts to bring an audio/visual system to the current and future fleet went underway to improve customer service and ADA accessibility by using next-stop announcements and public service announcements. Though the former Long Island Bus Division (now NICE Bus) had already deployed such a system throughout its fleet since the early-2000s, the MTA had only trialed similar systems alongside GPS tracking between 2007 and 2012 on select routes in the New York City Bus system. Current plans include the installation of digital information screens installed throughout the interior of the bus which will provide real-time information such as time, weather, advertisements, & service advisories. The screens are supplied by contract from 3 different vendors and are installed on new bus deliveries starting in 2017 while buses built after 2008 are currently receiving retrofits.

A new livery was also introduced, replacing the blue stripe livery on a white base that had been in use in one variation or another since the late 1970s. The first of these buses entered service in mid-May 2016 on the Q10 route.

=== Low and zero emission buses ===
Buses operating on clean or alternative fuels also make up a significant portion of the fleet, particularly since the establishment of the MTA's "Clean Fuel Bus" program in June 2000. Buses running compressed natural gas (CNG) were first tested in the early 1990s, and mass-ordered beginning in 1999. Hybrid-electric buses, operating with a combination of diesel and electric power, were introduced in September 1998, and mass-ordered beginning in 2004. Within the current fleet are over 1,600 diesel-electric buses and over 700 buses powered by compressed natural gas, which make up over half of the total fleet. This is the largest fleet of either kind in the United States.

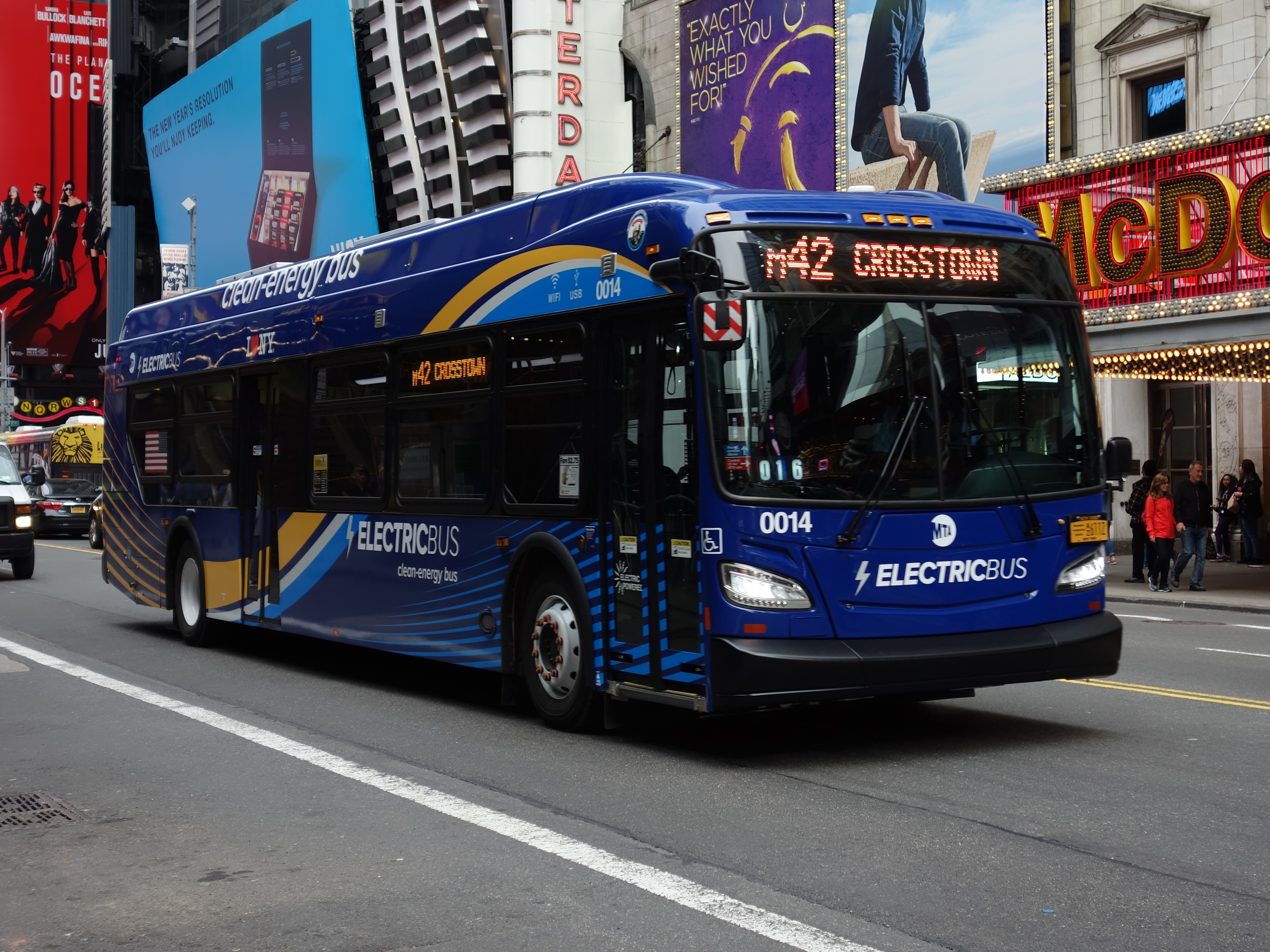
An NYCT New Flyer XE40

Between 2017 and 2021, the MTA tested a fleet of battery electric buses – subsequently ordering battery-electric buses in sixty-foot articulated and forty-foot lengths from 2019 onwards. In 2022, the MTA announced that they would trial hydrogen fuel cell buses, funded by a grant from New York State Energy Research and Development Authority. The first two buses (New Flyer Xcelsior CHARGE H2) will be launched in The Bronx by late 2024. The MTA announced that it would only purchase zero-emission buses from 2029, and that the entire bus fleet will be zero-emission by 2040.

== Fares ==
Dollar bills and half-dollar coins are not accepted on fixed-route buses or Select Bus Service payment stations, nor are they accepted on buses of the Bee-Line Bus System (Bee-Line) in Westchester County or the Nassau Inter-County Express (NICE) in Nassau County. All fares are in US dollars, and the following fare policy applies to all New York City Transit, MTA Bus, Metro-North's Hudson Rail Link, NICE, and Bee-Line (except for the BxM4C) buses. Up to three children who are 5 years old or younger get to ride free provided that they are accompanied by a fare-paying rider.

The Q70 route has not charged a fare since May 2022. From September 2023 to August 31, 2024, five additional routes—one in each borough, namely the Bx18, B60, M116, Q4 and S46/S96—did not charge any fares as part of a pilot program.

Local, Limited-Stop, Rush, and Select Bus Service (transfer available upon request)			Express Bus Service (New York City Bus and MTA Bus)		Access-A-Ride (New York City paratransit)
Full fare	Reduced fare	Student fare	Full fare	Reduced fare (off-peak only)	Access-A-Ride (New York City paratransit)
$3.00 ($3.50 for a Single-Ride ticket)	$1.50	Free	$7.25	$3.85	$3.00
Transfer rules: All transfers are good for 2 hours.; EXCEPTION: A three-hour transfer window applies from transfers from any subway station to the Q22, Q113, and Q114 routes of MTA Bus, and the n31, n32 and n33 routes of the Nassau Inter-County Express.; MetroCard transfers are good for one connecting trip on any other local or express bus service, New York City Subway, or Bee-Line buses (restrictions apply).; EXCEPTIONS: Two transfers are available with MetroCard/OMNY for the following transfers. The transfers must be made in order or in reverse order, and the 2-hour rule applies.; 1. Between bus routes crossing the Staten Island Railway south of the Staten Island Expressway, the Staten Island Railway through St. George Ferry Terminal, and then any MTA local bus or subway service below Chambers Street in lower Manhattan.; 2. Between the B61, B62, and any bus route connecting with either the B61 or the B62.; 3. Between the B70, S53, and any bus route connecting with the S53.; 4. Between the Q22, Q35, and the 2 and 5 trains at the Flatbush Avenue–Brooklyn College station.; 5. Between the Q22, Q52 Select Bus Service or Q53 Select Bus Service, and the A train at the Rockaway Boulevard station.; 6. Between the Q29, Q33, and Q72.; Transfers with coins are good for use on one connecting local bus route.; Other notes: Peak travel periods for express buses are 6:00 AM–10:00 AM and 3:00 PM–7:00 PM, Monday through Friday when buses are on a weekday schedule.

=== Fare collection ===
In November 1993, a fare system called the MetroCard was introduced, which allows riders to use cards that store the value equal to the amount paid to a subway station booth clerk or vending machine. The MetroCard was enhanced in 1997 to allow passengers to make free transfers between subways and buses within two hours; several MetroCard-only transfers between subway stations were added in 2001. With the addition of unlimited-ride MetroCards in 1998, the New York City Transit system was the last major transit system in the United States with the exception of BART in San Francisco to introduce passes for unlimited bus and rapid transit travel. Unlimited-ride MetroCards are available for 7-day and 30-day periods. One-day "Fun Pass" and 14-day cards were also introduced, but have since been discontinued.

In April 2016, MTA solicited proposals for a contactless "New Fare Payment System" to replace the MetroCard by 2022. On October 23, 2017, it was announced that the MetroCard would be phased out and replaced by OMNY, a contactless fare payment system also by Cubic, with fare payment being made using Apple Pay, Google Pay, debit/credit cards with near-field communication technology, or radio-frequency identification cards. All buses have accepted OMNY since December 2020. MetroCard sales ended December 31, 2025, although existing MetroCards could continue to be used until their balance was depleted or the card expired.

== Quality of service ==
=== Frequency ===
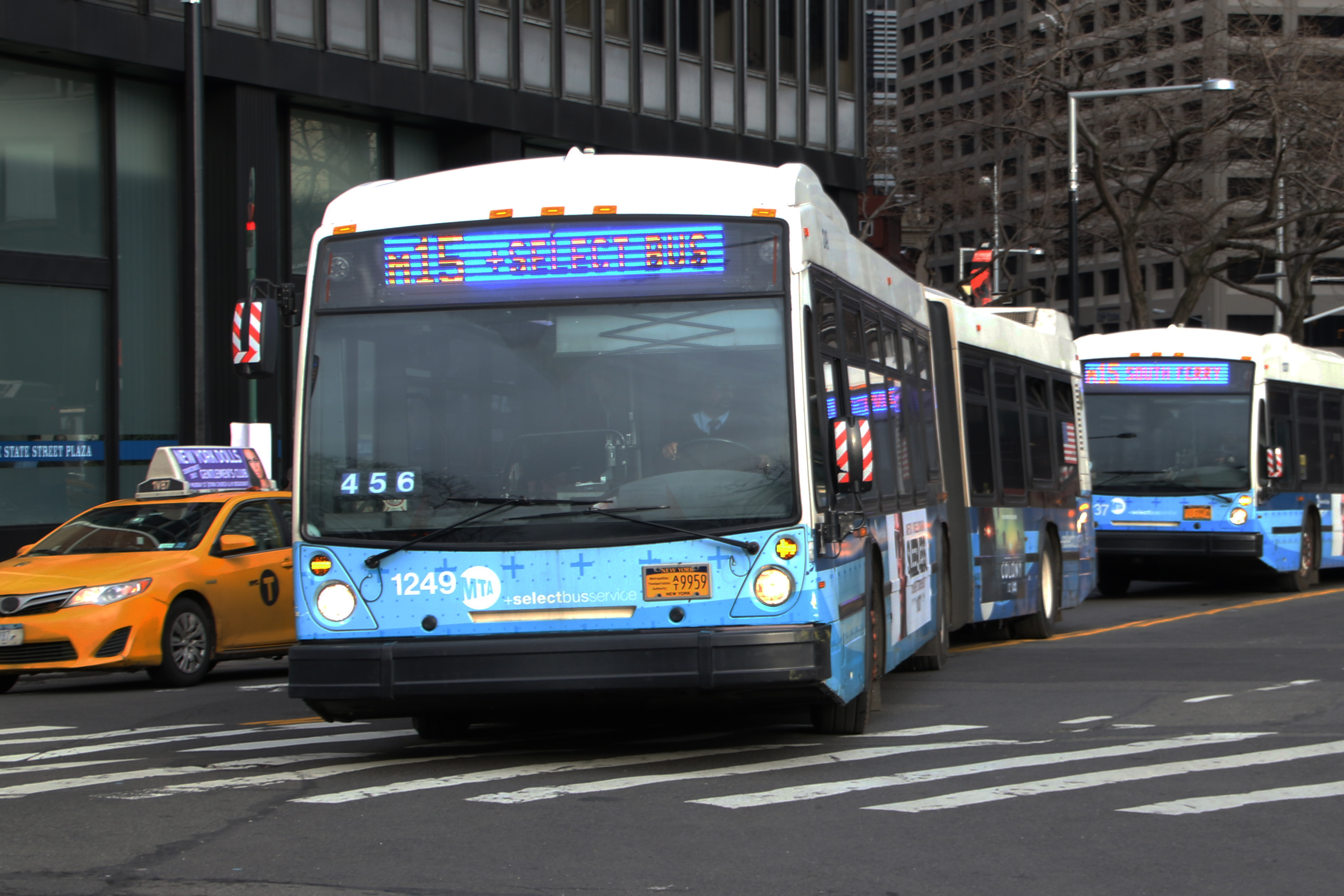
Two back-to-back buses on the M15 Select Bus Service route

As of November 2017, three-quarters of bus routes provide high-frequency service in at least one direction during rush hours, with buses arriving at least every ten minutes. Of these routes, 54% provide high-frequency service in both directions, while 21% provide service only in the peak direction (toward transit hubs during the morning, and away from these hubs during the evening). One quarter of routes run with headways of more than 10 minutes during rush hours.

Of the five boroughs, the Bronx has the greatest proportion of bus routes with high frequencies in both directions, with 65% of routes running such frequencies as of November 2017. Manhattan has the highest ratio of routes with high frequencies in at least one direction, at 85%. On the other hand, more than 60% of routes on Staten Island, the city's least populous borough, ran with low rush-hour frequencies, marking the highest such ratio in the city. In roughly 28% of the city's neighborhoods, less than half of routes operate at high frequencies in both directions. Neighborhoods outside of each borough's central business districts, as well as off-peak service, are more likely to be subject to low-frequency bus service, despite significant off-peak demand in areas like Forest Hills, Queens, and Sunset Park, Brooklyn. MTA Bus and New York City Bus also have the U.S.'s highest rates of deadhead runs, or "not-in-service" runs without passengers, with a respective 19% and 14% of trips being deadheads.

Buses running off-schedule are also common in the MTA Regional Bus system, with almost one in four buses running either too early or too late to maintain a constant spacing between buses. This is prevalent even on Select Bus Service bus rapid transit routes, where 20% of bus trips do not adhere to their schedules. Some routes suffer from bus bunching. Routes affected by bus bunching may not have any buses in a certain direction for prolonged periods of time, and then several buses will show up within a short time period. In 2017, nearly twelve percent of routes were considered to be bunched on a regular basis, compared to 9.4% in 2015. This phenomenon most affects bus routes within Brooklyn Community Board 5 in East Brooklyn, where 15% of buses are subject to bunching.

=== Speed ===
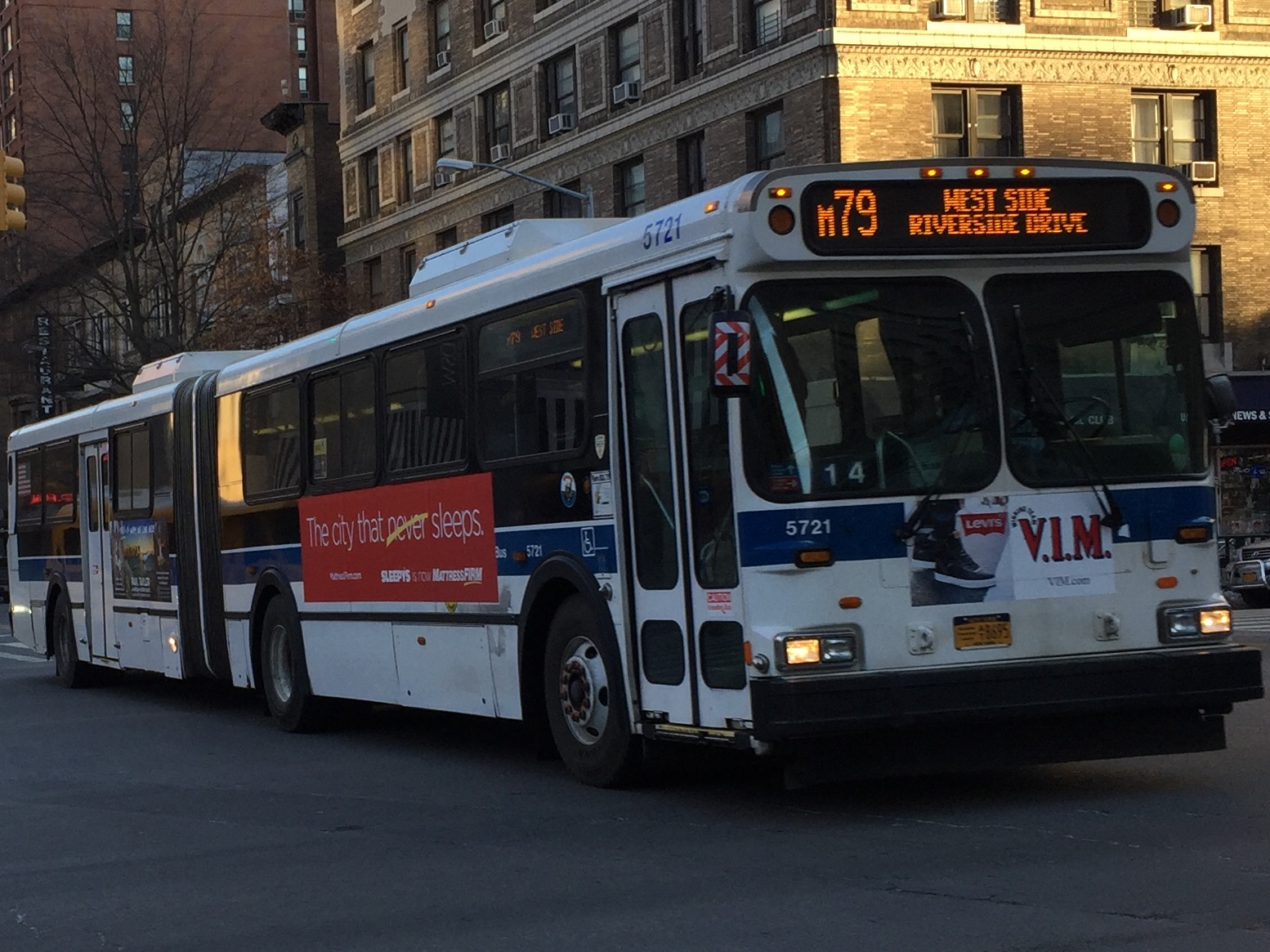
A bus on the M79 route, once ranked one of the slowest in the system

As of 2017, MTA buses on local buses run at average speeds of 7 to 8 miles per hour (11 to 13 km/h), the slowest of any major bus system nationwide. MTA Select Bus Service routes had marginally faster speeds, averaging 8.7 miles per hour (14.0 km/h). The average speed varies between boroughs, with Manhattan having the lowest average local-bus speed (6 miles per hour [9.7 km/h]) and Staten Island having the highest (11 miles per hour [18 km/h]). In 2017, sixteen of the seventeen bus routes with average speeds of less than 5 miles per hour (8.0 km/h) were located in Manhattan. Conversely, eight of the eleven routes with average speeds of more than 15 miles per hour (24 km/h) were located on Staten Island. On average, buses generally spend a little more than half of the trip (54%) in motion, while 22% of the trip is spent at bus stops and 21% is spent idling at red lights.

The Straphangers Campaign, another riders' advocacy group, gives out "Pokey Awards" to the slowest bus routes of each year. The slowest bus routes are typically crosstown bus routes in Manhattan, with 14 of the slowest bus routes in 2017 being crosstown bus routes. In 2017, the slowest bus route was the M42 crosstown bus on 42nd Street, which had an average speed of 3.9 miles per hour (6.3 km/h), approximately a walking pace. This was followed by the M31/M57, M50, and M66 crosstown buses on 57th, 49th/50th, and 65th/66th Streets respectively, all of which averaged less than 5 miles per hour (8.0 km/h). Other "winners" of the Pokey Award include the M79 on 79th Street and the M23 on 23rd Street, both of which have now been converted to Select Bus Service routes. However, Select Bus Service routes only serve 12% of all bus riders as of 2016, and the average bus route is 10% percent slower than it was in the mid-1990s.

A 2015 study found that 35 MTA routes with significant ridership figures had average speeds of less than 15 miles per hour (24 km/h), and that the M66 crosstown bus had an average speed of 3.1 miles per hour (5.0 km/h). Slow bus rides were not limited to Manhattan routes; the Bx2 bus in the Bronx and the B35 bus in Brooklyn both ran at speeds of less than 6 miles per hour (9.7 km/h). In 2018, the riders' advocacy group Bus Turnaround Campaign rated each bus route based on speed and reliability, and gave 75% of city bus routes a "D" or "F" grade. As a result, in early January 2019, former mayor Bill de Blasio promised to raise bus speeds by 25% by the next year.

As a result of these slow average speeds, MTA Regional Bus Operations has the highest per-mile operating cost of all city bus systems in the U.S., with a per-mile cost of $30.40. If the operating costs were closer to the U.S. average, MTA buses would have the highest farebox recovery ratio among U.S. cities' bus systems.

=== Length and winding routes ===
Many local New York City Bus and MTA Bus routes take long and winding routes that, in the most extreme cases, take more than two hours to traverse from end to end. Some of the longest routes are in Staten Island, where the average bus line is 10.6 miles (17.1 km) long. The longest local bus route in the city, the S78, is 20.8 miles (33.5 km) long and spans the entire length of Staten Island. Brooklyn also has several long bus routes, and the borough hosts three of the city's ten longest routes.

Some local routes divert into neighborhoods and detour down driveways rather than taking a more direct path. These routes then merge onto heavily congested main corridors. A 2017 report indicated that nearly half of bus routes had at least 10 turns along their routes. The most winding route was the Bx8 bus in the Bronx, with 29 turns.

Starting in 2015, the MTA investigated express bus routes on Staten Island, which were circuitous, duplicative, and infrequent. The MTA proposed replacing all of the existing express bus routes with simpler and shorter variants, a proposal supported by 76% of Staten Island residents who had learned about the study. After hosting several meetings with Staten Island residents, the MTA announced that express bus service to Staten Island was expected to be completely reorganized in August 2018. As part of the redesign, all of the existing bus routes were discontinued and replaced with 21 new routes with a "SIM" prefix. This was followed by the redesign of Bronx local and express routes, which took effect on June 26, 2022. The redesigns of the Brooklyn and Queens bus networks, initially scheduled for early 2021, were delayed due to the COVID-19 pandemic in New York City.

== Ridership ==
As of December 2017, weekday bus ridership in 2017 averaged 1.9 million, while total weekend ridership averaged 2.1 million. Express buses had an average weekday ridership of 40,200, while paratransit was used by a mean of 27,900 people each weekday.

Bus ridership has steadily declined through the 2000s and 2010s. From 2008 to 2017, bus ridership declined by more than 100 million. Average weekday bus ridership fell 5.7%, and average weekend bus ridership fell 4%, from 2016 to 2017. The greatest ridership decreases were in Manhattan, where bus ridership declined more than 15% from 2011 to 2016. Ridership decreased less dramatically in Brooklyn and parts of Queens and Staten Island, while ridership increased slightly within the Bronx, southwest Brooklyn, central Queens, and most of Staten Island. Bus lines that ran parallel to subway routes also saw ridership declines. As of 2017, there were thirteen bus routes with at least 20 stops within 0.1 miles (0.16 km) of a subway station; all saw ridership declines, with each route averaging a 20% loss.

== Service improvements ==
=== Bus lanes ===
Bus lanes on the B44 route in Brooklyn

To speed up bus service, the city started installing bus lanes in Downtown Brooklyn and St. George, Staten Island, in 1963. Another bus lane was soon installed along Hillside Avenue in Queens. In 1969, part of 42nd Street in Midtown Manhattan also received a bus lane. Additional bus lanes were added in the 1970s and 1980s. Bus lanes now exist on major corridors in all five boroughs, and are especially prevalent on high-volume and Select Bus Service corridors. There are also bus lanes along several highways that lead to Manhattan. The city's bus lane network is about 104 miles (167 km) long as of November 2017, representing nearly two percent of the city's 6,000 miles (9,700 km) of streets.

The bus lane rules are enforced by traffic cameras on gantries above the lanes; photos are taken of vehicles who violate the rules, and these motorists are then fined. Bus lanes have generally increased average bus speeds and reduced travel times where they are installed. However, double-parked vehicles and other obstructions often force buses to merge out of these lanes.

=== Bus priority signals ===
As of July 2017, traffic signal preemption is used on five bus corridors in New York City. Traffic signals with bus preemption allow traffic lights to display a green signal for a longer-than-normal period of time when a bus approaches the intersection. The first corridor to receive traffic signal priority was the Victory Boulevard corridor on Staten Island in 2006, which used infrared detection technology to allow traffic signals to communicate with transponders on buses. Although the system itself was successful, the buses with transponders were reassigned to bus routes in Brooklyn and Queens, rendering the devices useless. Moreover, MTA administrators did not see any cost savings from the program, and employees generally lacked the motivation to maintain the system. In 2008, the Victory Boulevard installation was followed by the Fordham Road and Pelham Parkway corridor (Bx12 bus) in the Bronx, which used GPS transponders aboard buses. Due to both systems' high cost, they were eventually removed from both corridors.

In 2011, Mayor Michael Bloomberg proposed that traffic signal priority be installed along 11 bus routes within the following two years. The MTA started testing signal priority along the M15 in Lower Manhattan in 2012. From 2014 to 2016, five Select Bus Service routes received GPS-based traffic signal priority at 260 intersections. They were the M15 in Manhattan; the B44 along Nostrand Avenue in Brooklyn; the S79 along Hylan Boulevard on Staten Island; the Bx41 along Webster Avenue in the Bronx; and the B46 along Utica Avenue in Brooklyn. The New York City government subsequently studied four of these routes, and found that all of the routes saw increases in average bus speeds along the portions that had bus priority signals. Speeds on these routes increased by an average of 18%.

Eleven more corridors were set to receive traffic signal priority by July 2017. The number of equipped intersections rose to 500 by March 2018, and was set to increase further to 1,000 intersections by 2020. However, as of that date, traffic signal priority was still in the testing stages, and preemptive traffic signals in New York City were used in much lower proportions than in other major cities. An expansion of traffic signal priority is planned as part of the Bus Action Plan. In January 2019, de Blasio said that the traffic signal priority program would be expanded to 1,200 intersections. As of June 2021, traffic signal priority was active at 1,700 intersections, and transponders had been installed in 2,700 vehicles that operated on seven routes.

=== Bus Action Plan ===
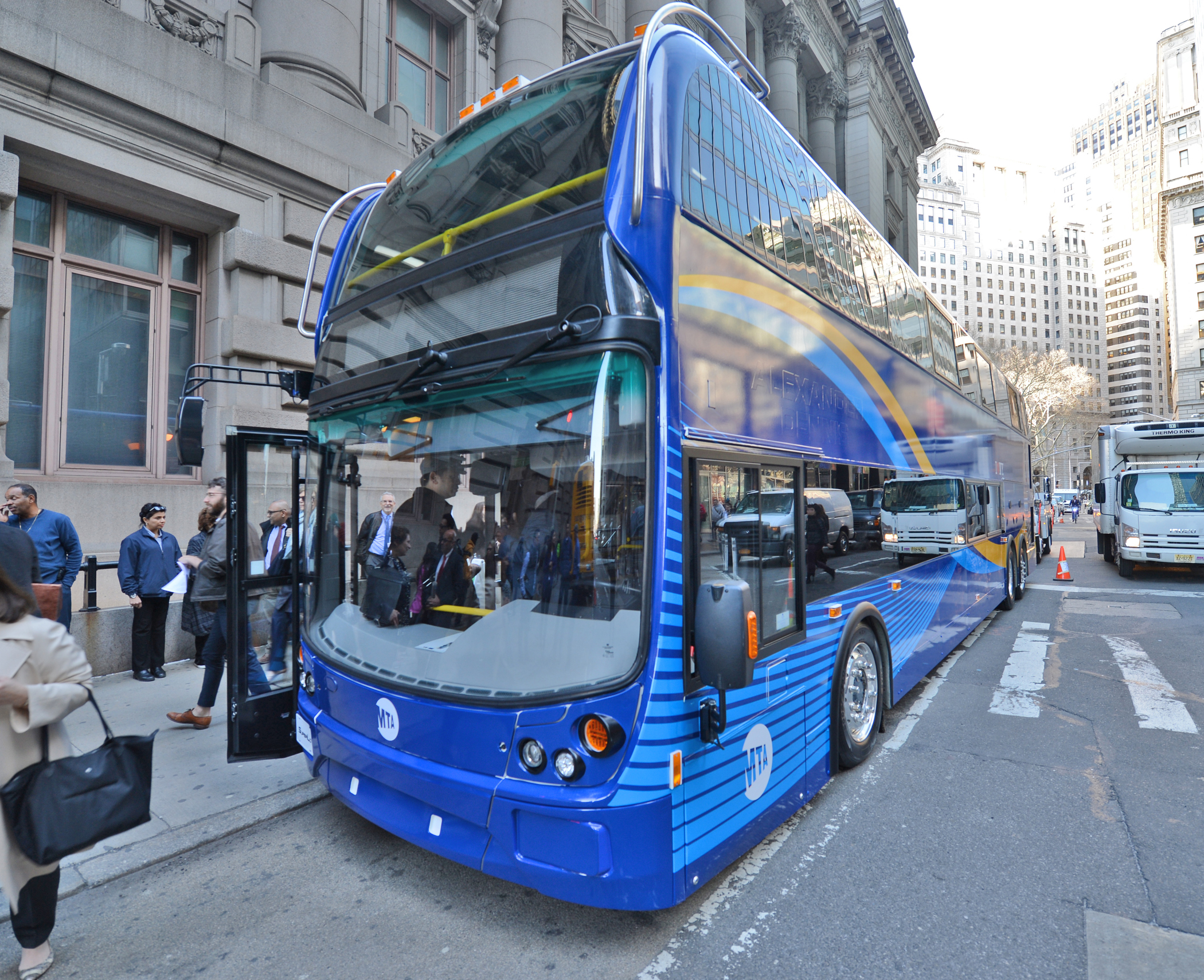
An Alexander Dennis Enviro500 double-decker bus unveiled as part of the Bus Action Plan

In April 2018, in response to a citywide transit crisis and complaints about the general quality of MTA bus service, the MTA published a Bus Action Plan detailing 28 suggestions to improve the bus system. Within twelve months, targeted corridor improvements were to be implemented, some bus stops would be removed to speed up service, and off-peak bus service would be expanded on strategic routes. As part of the plan, there will be a system-wide redesign of the bus network by 2021 to improve connectivity and provide more direct service.

Expanding bus priority is also part of the plan. Traffic Signal Priority would be implemented on additional routes, and new bus lanes and queue jump lanes would be instituted. In addition, the MTA would study ways to implement exclusive bus lanes and busways on priority corridors. To ensure that bus lanes are not blocked, dedicated transit-priority traffic teams would be put into place with the NYPD in 2019. Tap readers would be installed by the end of 2020, and all-door boarding would be installed with the introduction of a new contactless payment system that is planned to replace the MetroCard. There would be regular fare enforcement on bus routes to reduce fare evasion.

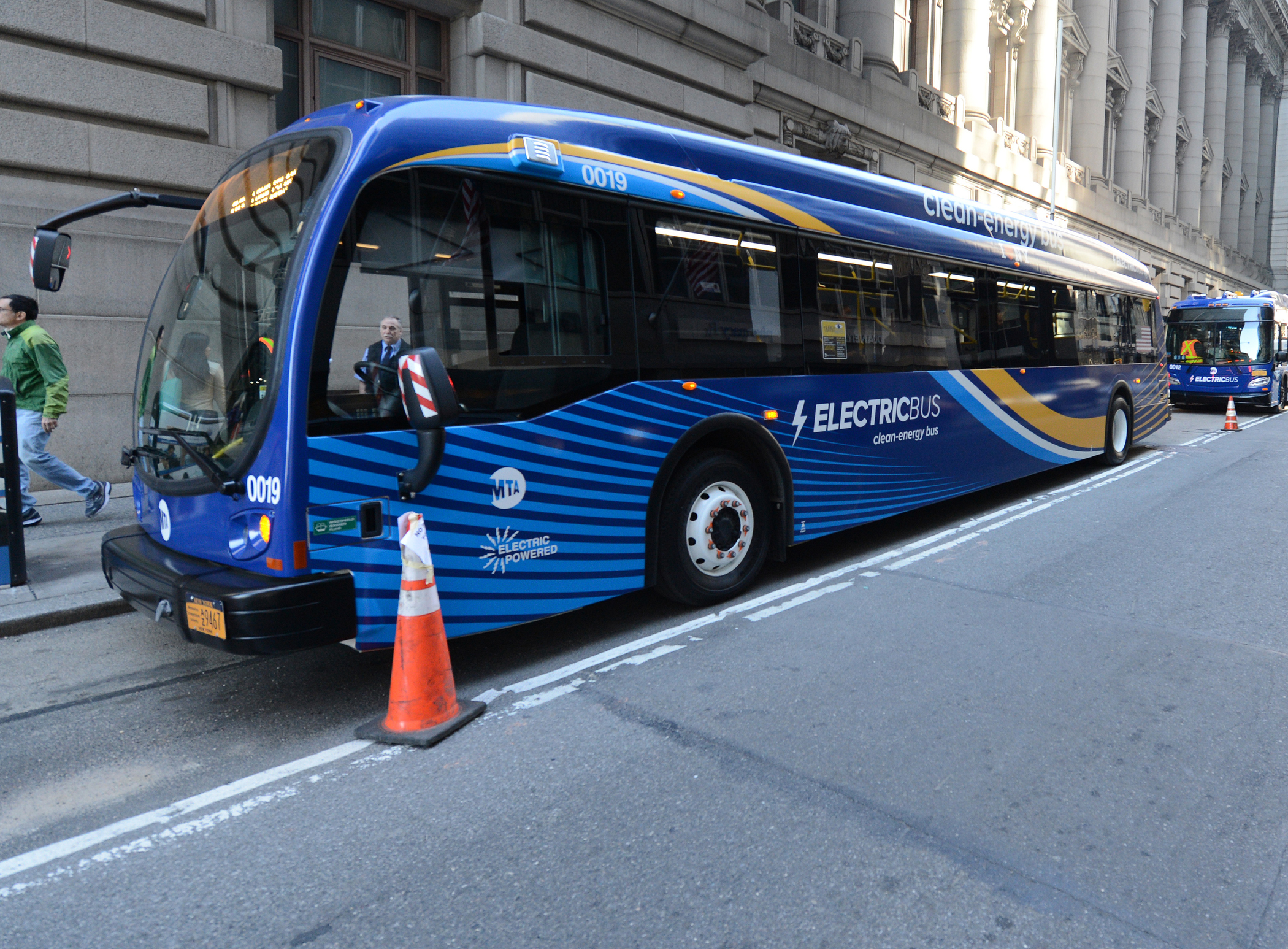
A Proterra used in the Action plan

The plan also contained some improvements to bus riders' experience. All buses delivered after April 2018, as well as 1,000 existing buses, would also receive digital information screens with automated announcements. In addition, by the end of 2018, new bus maps would be designed to make it easier to comprehend the bus network and to provide location-specific maps for neighborhoods in each neighborhood. Although the MTA had already started installing bus stop signs with real-time information, the Action Plan called for more bus shelters to be equipped with these signs. Starting in 2019, the MTA's mobile app would provide real-time seat availability information on selected bus routes. To reduce greenhouse gas emissions and improve air quality, the agency announced its transition to a zero-emissions electric bus fleet. The MTA would also test out a double-decker bus on the redesigned Staten Island bus routes in 2018.

Safety features and customer amenities were installed on new and existing buses as part of the Bus Action Plan. By January 2019, audible "pedestrian turn warning" announcement systems were installed on 617 buses, while cameras were installed on the inside of 3,469 buses and on the outside of 319 buses. Relocated or smaller pillars were installed on most new buses to increase visibility for drivers. Amenities such as USB charging ports, Wi-Fi, and digital information screens were installed on thousands of existing buses, as well as in all new buses. Traffic signal priority systems and automatic passenger counters were both installed in over a thousand buses. In addition, the MTA was planning to buy 248 compressed natural gas buses, 285 diesel-electric hybrid buses, and 60 electric buses in order to reduce energy emissions from the new bus fleet. Ten hybrid and ten electric buses had been tested in 2018.

As of June 2021, there were interior and exterior cameras on 4,200 buses, as well as rearview cameras on 120 buses. In addition, 1,300 buses had pedestrian turn warnings and 1,800 buses had high-visibility windows. Digital information screens were installed on 2,800 buses, and automatic passenger cameras with information about passenger loads were installed in 2,500 buses. Additionally, starting in 2021, newer buses were equipped with wider rear doors and wheelchair ramps. The MTA deactivated the buses' free Wi-Fi in January 2023, citing the fact that only two percent of riders used the Wi-Fi; the agency estimated that this would save $3.3 million annually. As part of a pilot program in early 2024, CCTV screens were to be installed on 100 buses to discourage fare evasion and assaults against staff.

== See also ==
- Transportation in New York City
