= Guide-A-Ride =

Bus stop information display

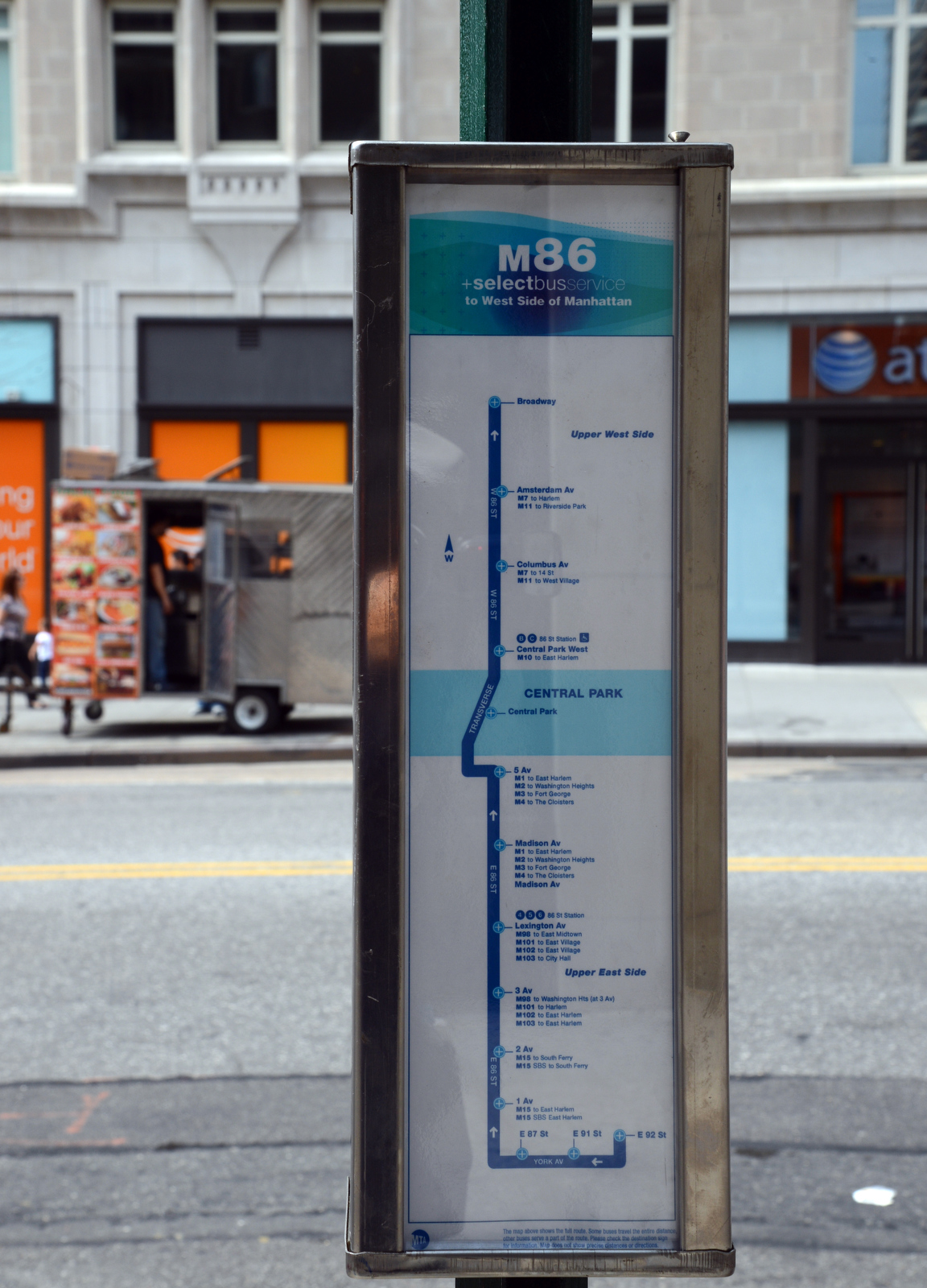
A Guide-A-Ride on the M86 SBS in Manhattan.

Guide-A-Ride is the bus stop information display for MTA Regional Bus Operations of New York City. It is a rectangular box attached to the bus stop pole that displays a route map and a schedule. Originally designed for MTA New York City Transit operations, it is also used for routes of the MTA Bus Company that were formerly privately operated.

The Guide-A-Ride canister is vandal-resistant and was designed for easy updating of the information displayed; though as a partly analog tool still requiring visits to the site – requiring some planning during the massive system-wide service reductions the MTA was forced to implement at the end of December 2009.

== History ==
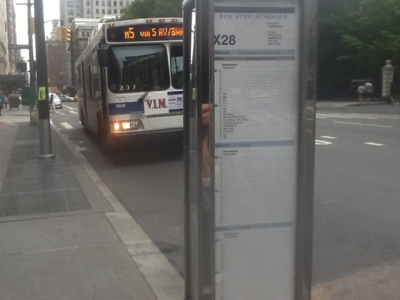
MTA New York City Transit Guide-A-Ride kiosk and bus

The New York City Transit Authority (NYCTA, NYCT, or TA) first announced a plan for "metal diagrammatic maps of bus routes on bus-stop stanchions" in 1964. These consisted of large metal signs (14 x 8 1/2 inches) with pictographic depictions of bus routes. Sometimes installed in the place of conventional bus stops, these signs were often considered confusing, as they attempted to consolidate multiple route maps onto a single sign and sometimes omitted routes.

The prototype for Guide-A-Ride was developed in 1977, the key novelty in the display of times to the minute the bus was due at the individual stop. The first sign was installed along the Q44A (now Q46) route in Queens.

Although skeptics doubted the ability of buses on New York City’s densely packed streets to show up anything like the times posted, on-time performance proved to be reliable. Regardless, customers were able to confirm whether they were at the right place at the right time. The actual displays began appearing at bus stops a few years later. The TA did not have a good reputation at the time, but Guide-A-Ride came to be viewed as one positive thing.

== Current status ==
Even despite being superseded by BusTime, Guide-A-Ride is still found at the vast majority of MTA Bus and New York City Bus stops, providing maps and stop codes used to track buses. Similar transit aids can be seen in at bus stops in other cities including Boston, Atlanta, and Los Angeles.
