= Cemusa =

Spanish advertising company

Cemusa is an advertising company based in Spain. The company specializes in providing and maintaining outdoor fixtures such as bus shelters in urban areas, paying for the right to run advertising on the fixtures. It was a unit of Fomento de Construcciones y Contratas but was sold to JCDecaux in November 2015.

== History ==
The company has had a history of doing business in Europe and eventually expanded its efforts westward, serving advertising as part of deals that provided outdoor installations. They started installing bus shelters and mailboxes in Mexico City in 1996. The company also started installing public toilets along with other ad-serving fixtures, in cities such as Rio de Janeiro.

The company soon started to extend its reach to North America. Cemusa reached deals with the U.S. cities of Boston, San Antonio and Miami to provide ad-serving bus shelters. In 2005, the company reached a 1.4 billion USD deal with New York City to provide 3500 bus shelters, over 300 newspaper kiosks and 20 public toilets to the city. The company outpaced other bidders, including U.S.-based firm Van Wagner and a joint venture between NBC Universal and JCDecaux. The deal wasn't without controversy though - as NBC Universal and JCDecaux protested the way the city evaluated the value of free advertising for use by the city. The companies requested that the bids be evaluated, but Cemusa still retained the contract. Cemusa unveiled its first bus shelter in December 2006. The company eventually rolled out the new newspaper kiosks - which have been criticized as easier for thieves to break into.

While the company has had issues with building its public toilets in a timely fashion, the company opened its first public toilet in New York City in January 2008.
