= Varick Street =

Street in Manhattan, New York

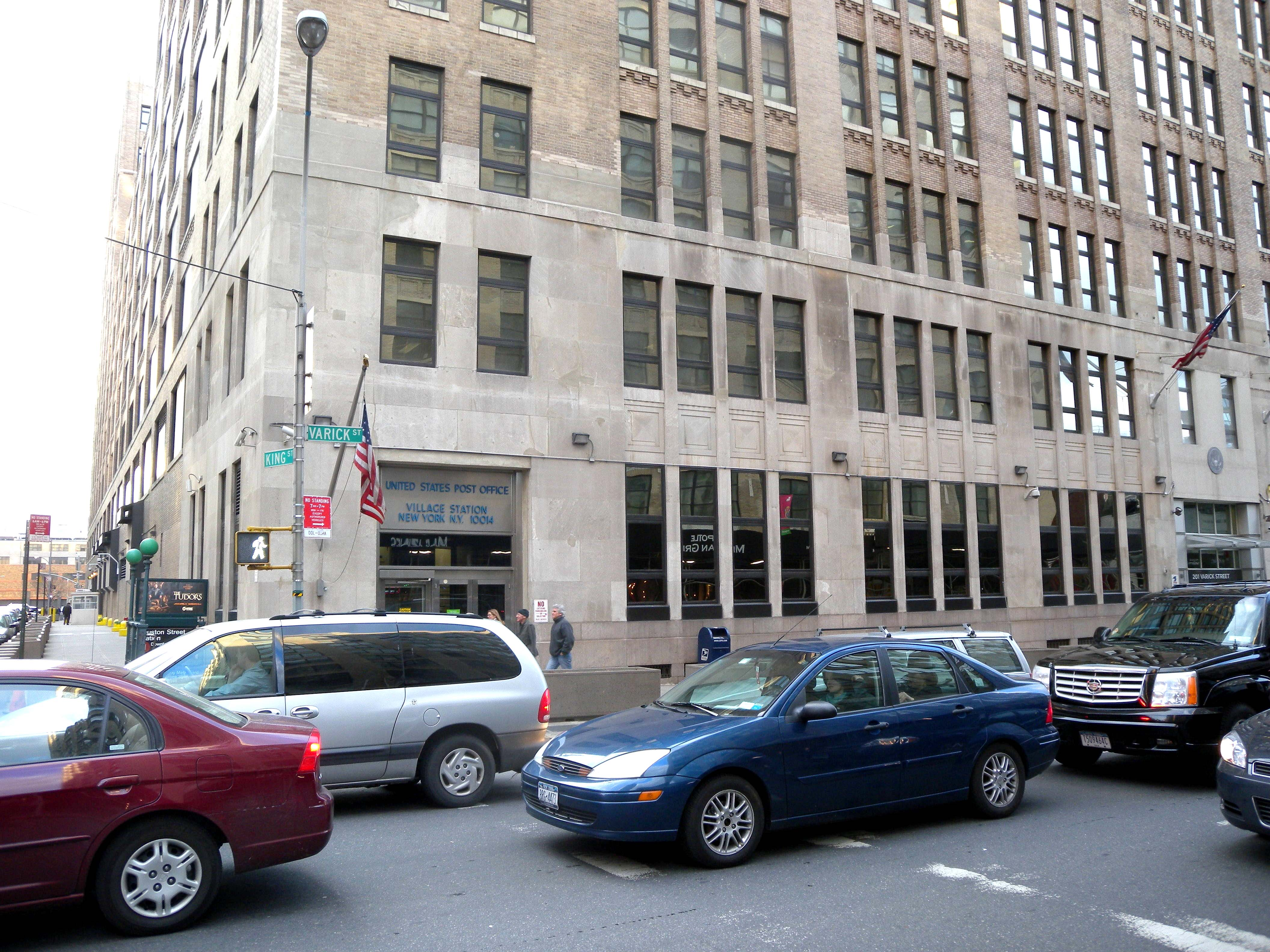
- Federal building at 201 Varick Street, home of the Environmental Measurements Laboratory and Village Station post office
- Location: Manhattan, New York City, United States
- North end: Seventh Avenue
- South end: West Broadway

Varick Street runs north–south primarily in the Hudson Square district of Lower Manhattan in New York City, New York. Varick Street's northern terminus is in the West Village, where it is a continuation of Seventh Avenue South south of Clarkson Street. It continues downtown through Hudson Square and TriBeCa until it reaches Leonard Street, where it merges with West Broadway. Motor traffic is one-way southbound. Major east–west streets crossed include Houston Street and Canal Street. Approaching Broome Street, the two rightmost lanes of Varick Street are reserved for traffic entering the Holland Tunnel, where backups often occur at rush hour.

== History ==
Varick Street is named for Richard Varick, an early New York lawmaker and the mayor of New York City from 1789 to 1801, who owned property in the area.

In 1853, Heinrich Englehard Steinweg (later known as Henry E. Steinway) founded the first American Steinway & Sons factory in a loft at the back of 85 Varick Street.

Varick Street was widened during the southward extension of Seventh Avenue in 1917. A number of old buildings were torn down during the widening project, including St. John's Chapel, which facilitated construction of the New York City Subway's IRT Broadway–Seventh Avenue Line and opened up a new vehicular route between Midtown and lower Manhattan.

== Transportation ==
The downtown M20 bus route runs the entire length of Varick Street (uptown buses use Hudson Street). Additionally, the crosstown M21 bus intersects Varick Street at Houston Street in the westbound direction and at Spring Street in the eastbound direction. The Houston Street, Canal Street, and Franklin Street subway stations on the IRT Broadway – Seventh Avenue Line (1 and 2 trains) are located under Varick Street.

== See also ==
- New York State Route 1A
