= West Broadway =

Street in Manhattan, New York

- LaGuardia Place
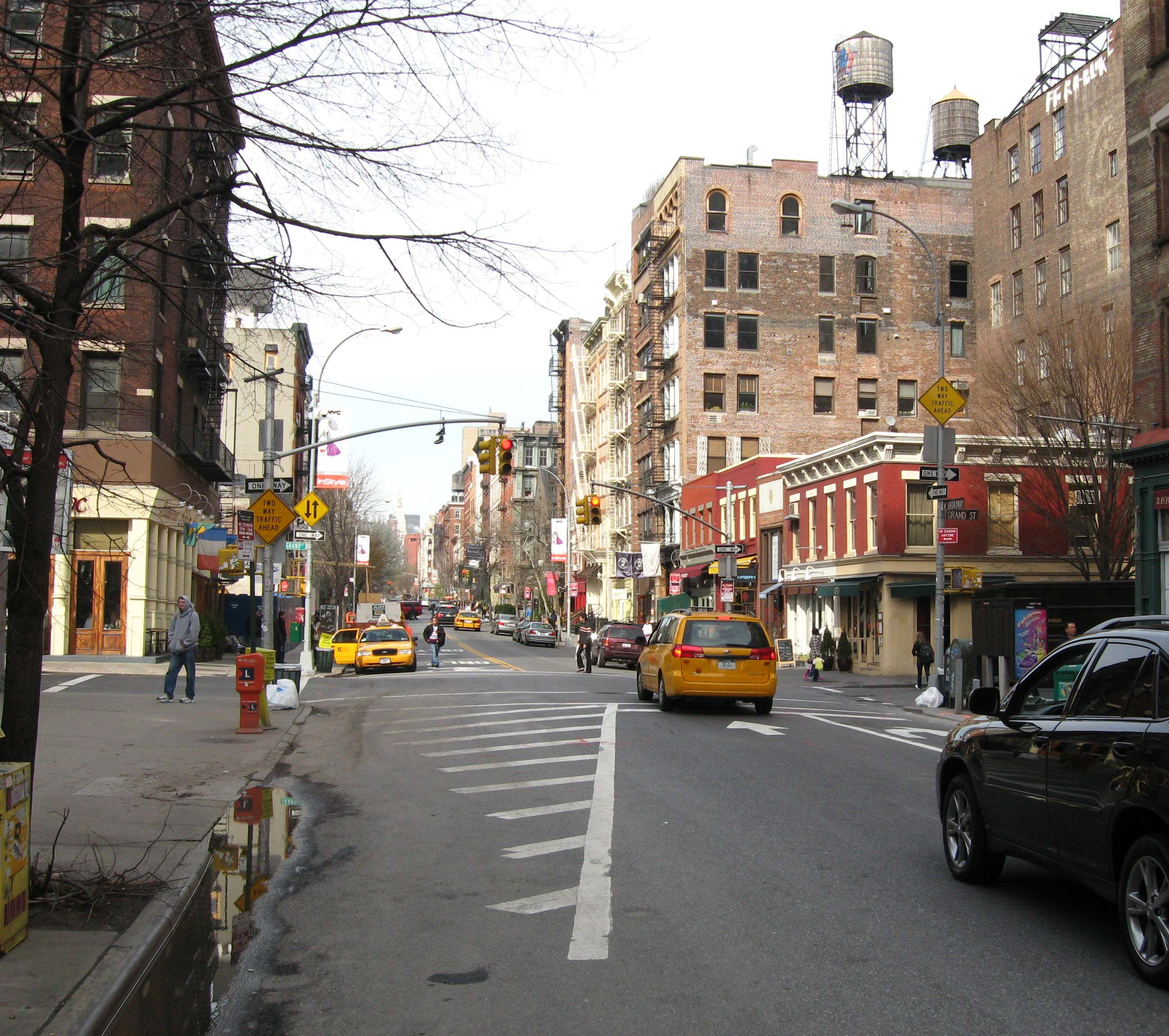
- Looking north towards Grand Street
- Owner: City of New York
- Maintained by: NYCDOT
- Length: 1.4 mi (2.3 km)
- Postal code: 10017, 10013, 10012
- Nearest metro station: Chambers Street; Franklin Street; Canal Street
- South end: Vesey Street in Financial District
- North end: Washington Square South in Greenwich Village
- East: Church Street (south of Canal); Wooster Street (north of Canal)
- West: Greenwich Street (south of Chambers); Hudson Street (Chambers to Leonard); Varick Street (Leonard to Canal); Thompson Street (north of Canal)

West Broadway is a north-south street in the New York City borough of Manhattan, separated into two parts by Tribeca Park. The northern part begins at Tribeca Park, near the intersection of Avenue of the Americas (Sixth Avenue), Walker Street and Beach Street in Tribeca. It runs northbound as a one-way street past Canal Street and becomes two-way at the intersection with Grand Street one block farther north. West Broadway then operates as a main north-south thoroughfare through SoHo until its northern end at Houston Street, on the border between SoHo and Greenwich Village. North of Houston Street, it is designated as LaGuardia Place, which continues until Washington Square South.

The southern part of West Broadway runs southbound from Tribeca Park (Note: Although the neighborhood is "TriBeCa", the park is called by the city's Parks Department "Tribeca Park". See "Tribeca Park" New York City Department of Parks and Recreation) through the TriBeCa neighborhood, ending at Park Place. Prior to the September 11, 2001 attacks, West Broadway continued southward into the World Trade Center site, ending at Vesey Street. It was once considered "Rotten Row".

== History ==
West Broadway was once two streets: Chapel Street below Canal Street, and Laurens Street above it.

In the early 1750s, Trinity Church laid down a street grid on its property, known as King's Farm, between the Hudson River and Broadway in lower Manhattan. About the same time, Trinity founded King's College, now Columbia University, and donated a plot of land bordered by Barclay, Murray, and Church Streets for its campus, to which the school moved in 1760. According to a 1755 map, "Chappel Street" was part of this grid, running from Barkly (Barclay) to just past Warrens (Warren) Street and ending at the palisade which protected the north end of the city. In the 1760s, Trinity Church ceded its streets between Fulton and Reade Streets to the city and Anthony Rutgers' heirs, owners of the land north of Reade Street, mapped their property into streets and lots. In the 1790s, Chapel Street was graded and paved from Murray to Reade Streets and extended to Leonard Street.

In 1831, the New York City Common Council renamed the two blocks of Chapel Street between Barclay and Murray Streets "College Place". A decade later Chapel Street was renamed "West Broadway" with the same purpose as that behind the renaming of East Broadway, to reduce the traffic congestion on Broadway itself, but both names were used for over twenty more years. An 1835 map calls Chapel Street "West Broadway" but an 1850 map calls it "Chapel Street". (Note: Similarly, an 1837 advertisement refers to "West Broadway" ("Highly Concentrated Compound". New York Herald. February 17, 1837. p. 4, col. 2, third advertisement, fourth line from bottom) and an 1857 news story refers to "Chapel Street" ("The Rescue of Auguste Parot" (PDF). The New York Times. September 1, 1857. paragraph 4).) Around 1850, the two blocks from Murray to Chambers Street were renamed to be part of College Place.

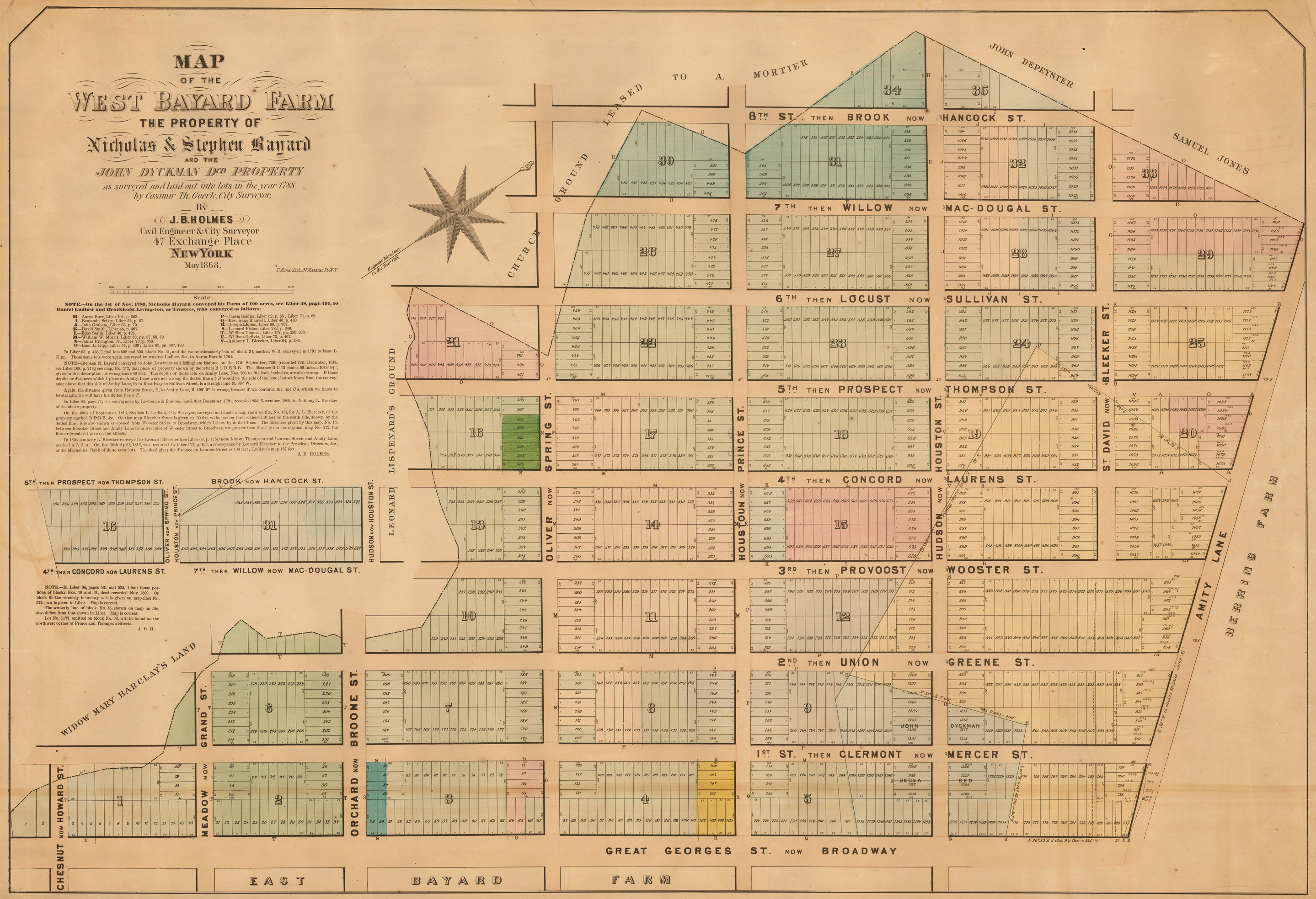
Origin of Laurens Street

Laurens Street belonged to a different grid. In 1788, the Bayard family, dividing their farm into blocks and lots for sale, laid down eight streets parallel to Broadway, numbered from east to west, plus seven cross streets. A few years later, the numbered streets were named, and by the turn of the century they were renamed again for Revolutionary War officers, including Henry Laurens (see map). By the 1830s, the neighborhood was a red-light district nicknamed "Rotten Row", and by the 1860s it was beset by poverty, filth, and violent crime. An 1860 proposal to widen Laurens Street and extend it north one block to Washington Square Park was carried out in 1869 and 1870. In addition, a roadway was built to connect West Broadway to Fifth Avenue, introducing carriage traffic into Washington Square Park, and Laurens Street was officially renamed South Fifth Avenue in an attempt to improve its image.

The 1860 proposal to widen Laurens Street had accompanied a proposal to widen College Place and extend it southward to Greenwich Street. (Note: A similar proposal had been made ten years earlier. ("Common Council". New York Herald. November 9, 1850. p. 7, col. 2, "Board of Assistant Aldermen", "Reports of Committees", paragraph 3. "Committee on Streets…to non-concur in resolution to employ a surveyor to estimate the expense of extending and widening College Place from Barclay to Greenwich Streets. Adopted.")) It was finally carried out in 1895, when Laurens Street and South Fifth Avenue were both made part of West Broadway.

=== LaGuardia Place ===
In 1967 the section of the street north of Houston Street was renamed "LaGuardia Place", after former mayor Fiorello La Guardia. It features LaGuardia Gardens, between West 3rd and Bleecker Streets, which includes a commissioned statue of the "Little Flower", as La Guardia was nicknamed. Sculpted by Neil Estern, with a pedestal designed by architect Ruth Shapiro, the bronze statue was dedicated in 1994, and was commissioned and donated to the city by the Friends of LaGuardia Place. The sculpture was commissioned as part of a project to beautify and revitalize that section of the street, whose buildings had been torn down many years before by Robert Moses to be part of the Fifth Avenue South connector to his never-built Lower Manhattan Expressway.

== Transportation ==
=== Current ===
The southbound M20 bus of the New York City Bus system runs on West Broadway from the five-way intersection with Varick Street and Leonard Street south to Chambers Street. The Franklin Street and Chambers Street stations of the IRT Broadway–Seventh Avenue Line (1, 2, and 3 trains) are located on West Broadway.

=== Former ===
The Sixth Avenue Elevated, formally the Metropolitan Elevated Railway, opened on June 5, 1878. It ran above College Place, West Broadway, and South Fifth Avenue from Murray Street, where it turned from Church Street, to Amity (West 3rd) Street, where it turned to Sixth Avenue. The Sixth Avenue El was abandoned on December 4, 1938 and razed in 1939, being replaced by the underground IND Eighth Avenue Line.
