= Greenwich Street =

Street in Manhattan, New York

Coordinates: 40°43′18.96″N 74°0′35.44″W

- Interactive map of Greenwich Street
- Former name: Road to Greenwich
- Part of: Meatpacking District, West Village, Hudson Square, Tribeca
- Namesake: Greenwich Village
- Type: Street
- Length: 2.5 mi (4.0 km)
- north end: Ninth Avenue and Gansevoort Street
- south end: The Battery

Construction
- Construction start: 1790s

Other
- Known for: World Trade Center, skyscrapers

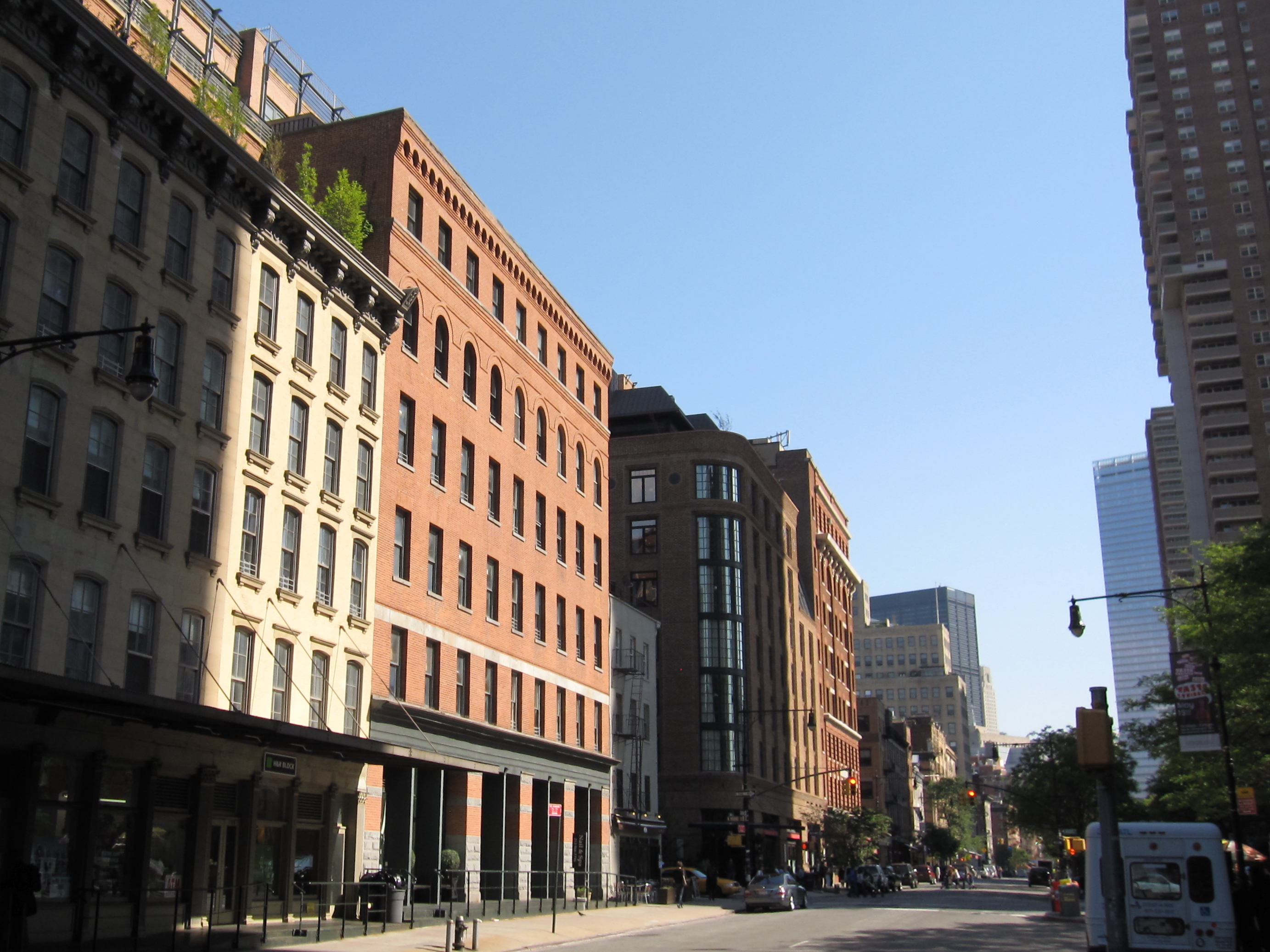
Looking south from near North Moore Street

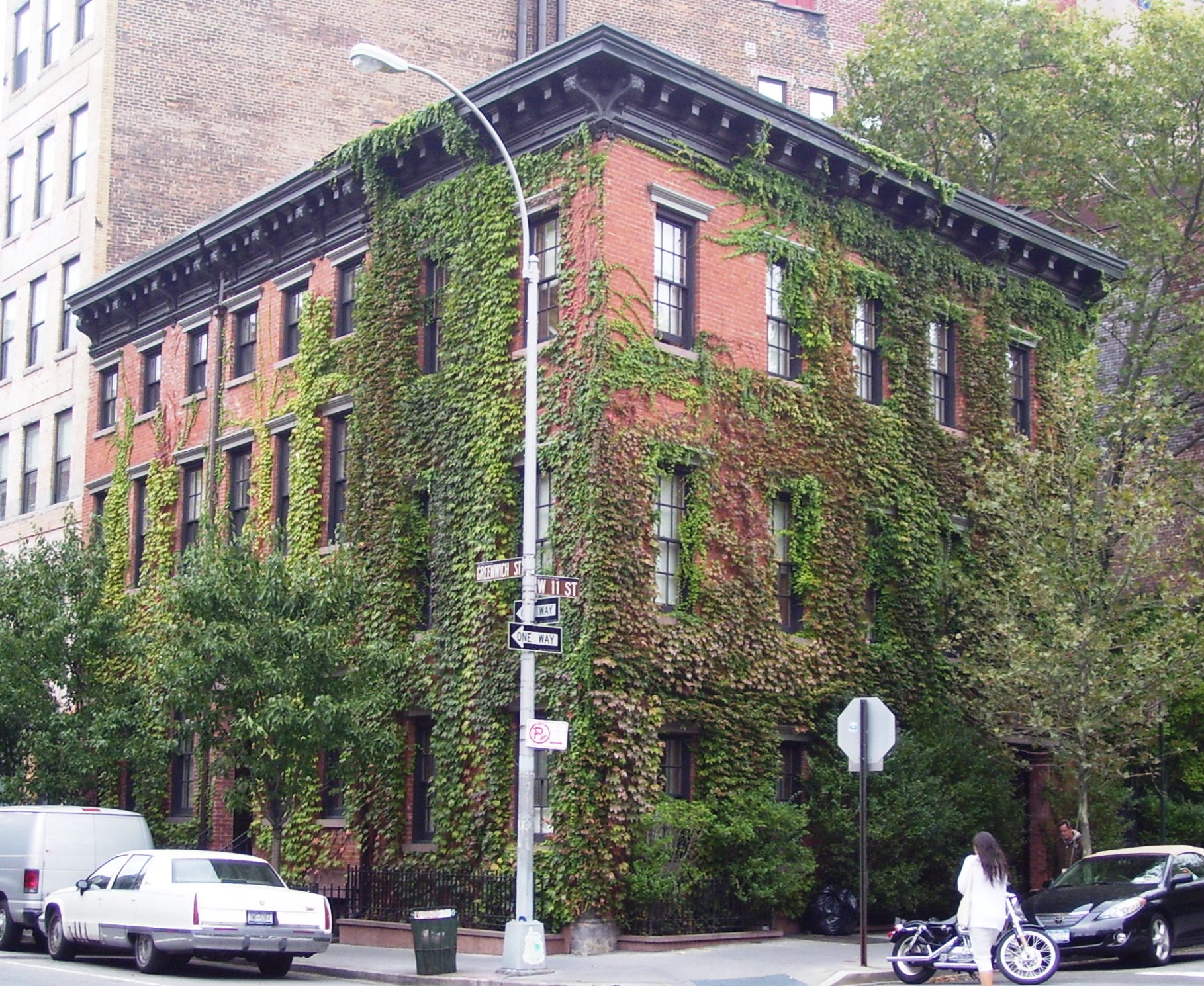
753-57 Greenwich Street at West 11th Street

Greenwich Street is a north–south street in the New York City borough of Manhattan. It extends from the intersection of Ninth Avenue and Gansevoort Street in the Meatpacking District at its northernmost end to its southern end at Battery Park. Greenwich Street runs through the Meatpacking District, the West Village, Hudson Square, and Tribeca.

Main east–west streets crossed include, from north to south, Christopher Street, Houston Street, Canal Street, and Chambers Street. North of Canal Street, traffic travels northbound on Greenwich Street; south of Canal Street, it travels southbound.

== History ==
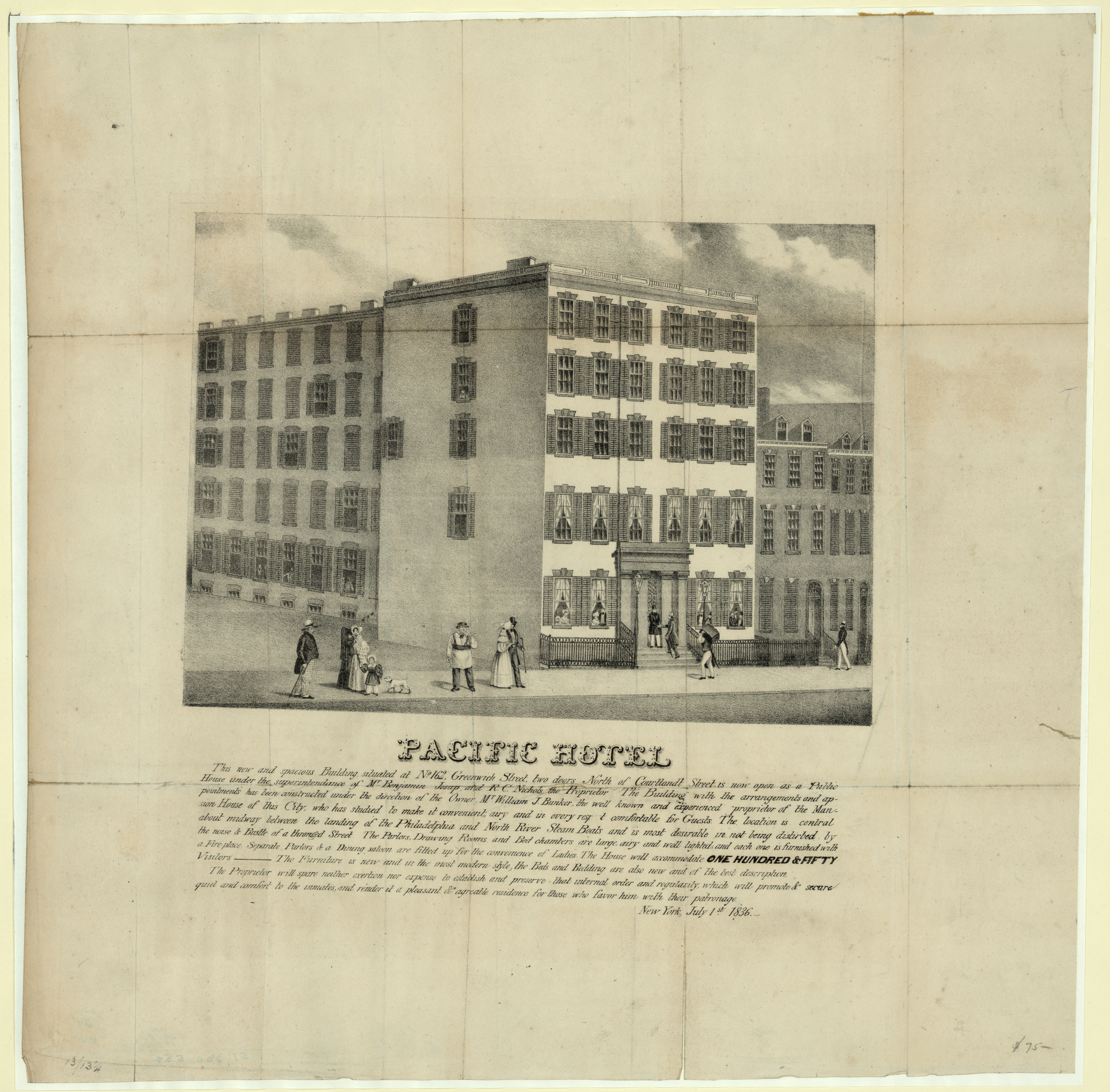
Pacific Hotel on Greenwich Street depicted in an 1836 illustration

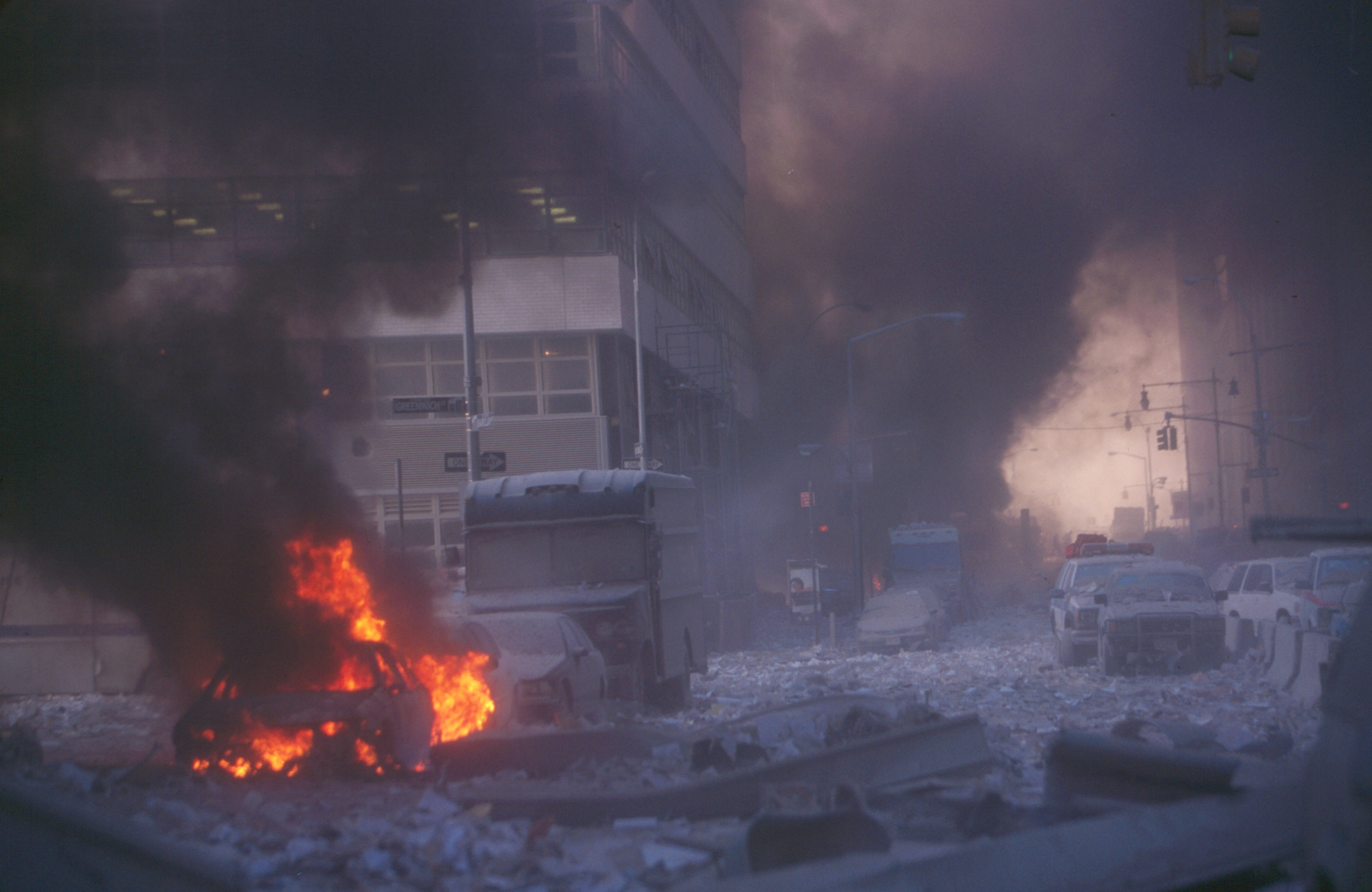
The corner of Greenwich and Barclay near the World Trade Center immediately following the September 11 attacks in 2001

The earliest documentation of Greenwich Street came in the 1790s, when it ran parallel to the Hudson River. At that time it was called 'Road to Greenwich', as it was the only continuous road from Lower Manhattan to Greenwich Village other than Broadway.

By the late 18th century, lower Greenwich Street had become part of one of the most fashionable residential neighborhoods in the city, lined with four-story Federal-style mansions, although upper Greenwich street was home to artisans, shopkeepers and an enclave of free blacks. Greenwich Street still maintained its status as a choice address in 1820, but by the 1850s, the wealthy residents had fled uptown, and private residences on the street became unusual. Hotel owner Amos Eno left once he was "surrounded by immigrant boarding houses," according to his daughter. In 1873, the Butter and Cheese Exchange opened on the street, not far from where dairy products arrived daily at the freight railroad terminals. By 1882, a steam generation plant of the New York Steam Company was at Greenwich and Dey Streets.

In the early 19th century, circus impresario John Bill Ricketts opened his New Amphitheatre on Greenwich streets, designed by Joseph-François Mangin, where sell-out crowds watched his "Equestrian Circus", which featured "clowns, tightrope walkers, tumblers, acrobatic riders, mounted Indians and fireworks." This continued a tradition for the area, as 150 years earlier "Vauxhall Gardens", which boasted a wax museum and fireworks and served afternoon teas, was put up by Samuel Fraunces, of Fraunces Tavern, near the present corner of Greenwich and Warren Streets.

In 1824, painter Thomas Cole, who had arrived in the U.S. in 1818, maintained his residence in a garret on Greenwich Street, exhibiting his paintings in local shops. Poet and writer Edgar Allan Poe lived in a boardinghouse on the street briefly between 1844 and 1845, but did not like the neighborhood, complaining of dirty streets and the noise made by clam-and-catfish vendors.

Also on Greenwich Street in the mid-1800s was one of the many outlets of "Madame Restell" (Ann Lohman), who sold pills for abortion of unwanted pregnancies. The Greenwich Street location doubled as a lying-in facility for women who wanted to bear their child. In 1846, an angry mob, riled up by Restell's competitors and false claims of murder, descended on her Greenwich Street headquarters and attempted to evict her from the city; 40 policemen restored order. Restell, who was wealthy from her business, was arrested a number of times, but was able to buy her way out of trouble, and eventually built a mansion at Fifth Avenue and 52nd Street.

In 1867, engineer Charles T. Harvey managed to get permission from the New York State Legislature to build a short stretch of elevated track as an experiment on Greenwich Street north of Battery Place. The half-mile single-track set-up, which had two stationary engines at each end, attached by cables to a car which the motors shuttled back and forth, was ready for testing by June 1868. Harvey filed for personal bankruptcy on Black Friday (1869), resulting from the speculations of Jay Gould and James Fisk, but the company he set up went through several reorganizations and emerged in 1872 as the New York Elevated Railway Company, which utilized steam locomotives to pull cars on a single elevated track that ran up Greenwich and Ninth Avenue to 30th Street, where a connection could be made at the terminal of the Hudson River Railroad. Eventually, this would become the IRT Ninth Avenue Line; the elevated tracks were demolished in 1940.

At the World Trade Center site, Greenwich Street once ran through a neighborhood called Radio Row, which specialized in selling radio parts. The neighborhood was demolished in 1962, when the area was condemned to make way for the Construction of the World Trade Center. After the World Trade Center was destroyed in the September 11 attacks, the public supported rebuilding a street grid through the World Trade Center site. It was ultimately decided to rebuild Cortlandt, Fulton, and Greenwich Streets, which had been destroyed during the original World Trade Center's construction.

=== Etymology ===
Both Greenwich Street, originally called Greenwich Road, and Greenwich Avenue, with which it is sometimes confused, derive their names from the formerly independent Greenwich Village, a rural settlement that was subsumed by New York City as the city grew northward. "Greenwich" means "Green village", with the "wich" derived from Latin vicus through Old Saxon wick. Of the two roads, Greenwich Street was the shorter, more scenic and popular route to the village, but often flooded until the 19th century, when landfill moved the river's edge farther away.

== Transportation ==
=== Subway ===
The IRT Broadway–Seventh Avenue Line runs under Greenwich Street from Vesey Street south to its end. The Cortlandt Street and Rector Street stations (1 train) serve it directly. Other New York City Subway stations serve Greenwich Street from nearby. These include (from north to south) the 14th Street–Eighth Avenue station (A, C, E, and L trains); the Christopher Street–Sheridan Square (local), Houston Street (local), Canal Street (local), Franklin Street (local) and Chambers Street (express) stations on the IRT Broadway–Seventh Avenue Line (1, 2, and 3 trains); and the Chambers Street–World Trade Center station (A, C, and E trains).

The Christopher Street PATH train station (HOB–33, JSQ–33, and JSQ–33 (via HOB) trains) is on Christopher Street just east of Greenwich Street. The World Trade Center PATH station (NWK–WTC and HOB–WTC trains) is at Vesey and Greenwich Streets.

The World Trade Center Transportation Hub, between Greenwich and Church Streets, connects the five stations at the World Trade Center site (2, 3, A, C, E, N, R, and W trains, as well as PATH trains). The combined station connects via the Dey Street Passageway with the Fulton Center (2, 3, 4, 5, A, C, J, and Z trains).

=== Bus ===
The uptown M11 and M55 operates on Greenwich Street north of Bethune Street and south of Morris Street, respectively.

The following buses intersect with, but do not stop on, the street:

- The M8 crosses on Christopher Street westbound and West 10th Street eastbound.
- The M21 crosses on Houston Street westbound and Spring Street eastbound.
- The M20 crosses on Chambers Street westbound, Harrison Street eastbound, and Battery Place in both directions.
- The M22 crosses on Chambers Street in both directions.
- The M9 crosses on Murray Street westbound and Warren Street eastbound.

== Notable buildings and establishments ==
- 401 Greenwich Street
- 443 Greenwich Street
- 408 Greenwich Street
- 388 Greenwich Street
- 240 Greenwich Street
- 125 Greenwich Street
- 88 Greenwich Street
- 7 World Trade Center
- 4 World Trade Center
- 3 World Trade Center
- 2 World Trade Center
- American Stock Exchange Building
- Tribeca Grill
