= Tribeca Dog Run =

Dog run in Manhattan, New York

Coordinates: 40.716218°N 74.012075°W

The Tribeca Dog Run is a 4,000-square-foot (370 m^{2}) public park located in the New York City borough of Manhattan. It is located on Warren Street between Greenwich Street and West Street in the Tribeca neighborhood.

== Dog Owners of Tribeca ==
Anyone caught allowing non-members to access the facility (holding the door open for non-members or giving the access code to non-members) will forfeit their membership.

— Dog Owners of Tribeca, Dog Owners of Tribeca, Inc. Warren Street Dog Park Rules at the Wayback Machine (archived February 26, 2017)

The Warren Street Dog Park is privately owned. The NYC Parks Dept. has no involvement whatsoever with the park.

— Dog Owners of Tribeca, Interested in Becoming a member? at the Wayback Machine (archived February 26, 2017)

Dog Owners of Tribeca was an organization which captured the Tribeca Dog Run from 2008-2018 with the false claim that it operated and controlled access to the park. The organization called the park "Warren Street Dog Park" and restricted access to the park to individuals who paid a membership fee, which was $120/year in 2018. In April 2018 a review of the land and nearby property prompted the city government to review the relationship of the Dog Owners of Tribeca with the park. When it seemed like the city government would claim the park, board members of the Dog Owners of Tribeca complained. In 2018 the New York City Department of Parks and Recreation restored public access to the park after people realized that the organization misrepresented itself as having a right to restrict public access. To protect the park the parks department cut the locks with a blowtorch and installed an official public park placard.

In describing the events, a commentator from Boing Boing described the members of the Dog Owners of Tribeca as "over-entitled".

== See also ==
- Adverse possession § Additional requirements, "Generally, a disseisor cannot dispossess land legally owned by a government entity"
