= Houston Street station (IRT Broadway–Seventh Avenue Line) =

New York City Subway station in Manhattan

Houston Street
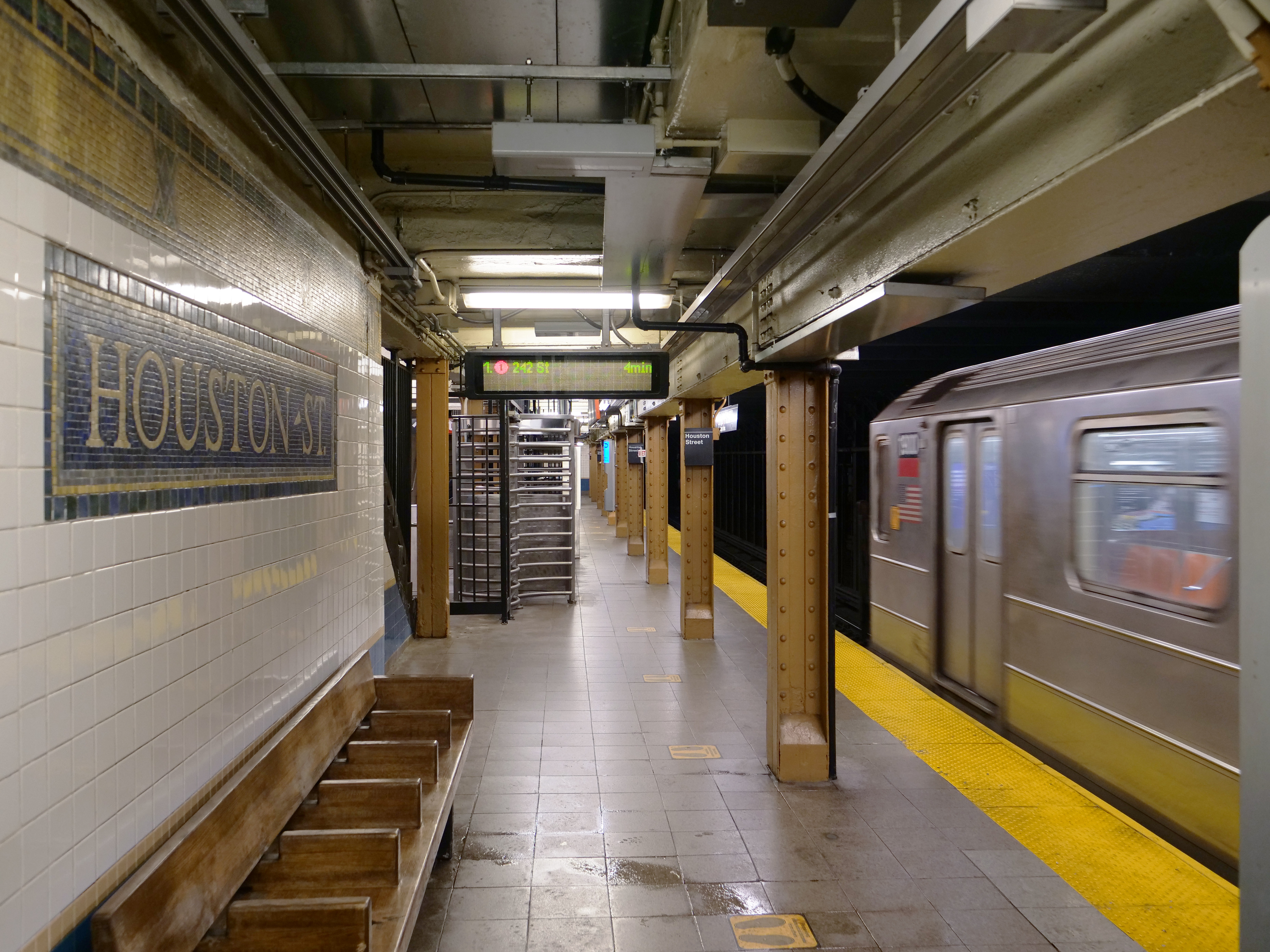
- Northbound 1 train departing

Station statistics
- Address: West Houston Street & Varick Street; New York, New York
- Borough: Manhattan
- Locale: Greenwich Village, West Village, Hudson Square
- Coordinates: 40.7286°N 74.0053°W
- Division: A (IRT)
- Line: IRT Broadway–Seventh Avenue Line
- Services: 1 (all times); 2 (late nights)
- Transit: NYCT Bus: M20, M21, SIM7, SIM9, SIM33
- Structure: Underground
- Platforms: 2 side platforms
- Tracks: 4

Other information
- Opened: July 1, 1918; 108 years ago

Traffic
- 2025: 3,577,161 ▲18.5%
- Rank: 100 out of 423
Services
Preceding station	New York City Subway	Following station
Christopher Street–Stonewall 1 2 toward Van Cortlandt Park–242nd Street	Local	Canal Street 1 2 toward South Ferry
does not stop here
Location
Location within New York City Subway
Location within New York City
Location within New York
Track layout
Street map
Station service legend
Symbol	Description
Stops all times	Stops all times
Stops late nights only	Stops late nights only
Stops late nights and weekends	Stops late nights and weekends

The Houston Street station (/ˈhaʊstən/ HOW-stən) is a local station on the IRT Broadway–Seventh Avenue Line of the New York City Subway. Located at West Houston and Varick Streets in the Greenwich Village and Hudson Square neighborhoods of Manhattan, it is served by the 1 train at all times and by the 2 train during late nights.

The station was built by the Interborough Rapid Transit Company (IRT) as part of the Dual Contracts with New York City, and opened on July 1, 1918. The station had its platforms extended in the 1960s, and was renovated in 1994.

== History ==
=== Construction and opening ===
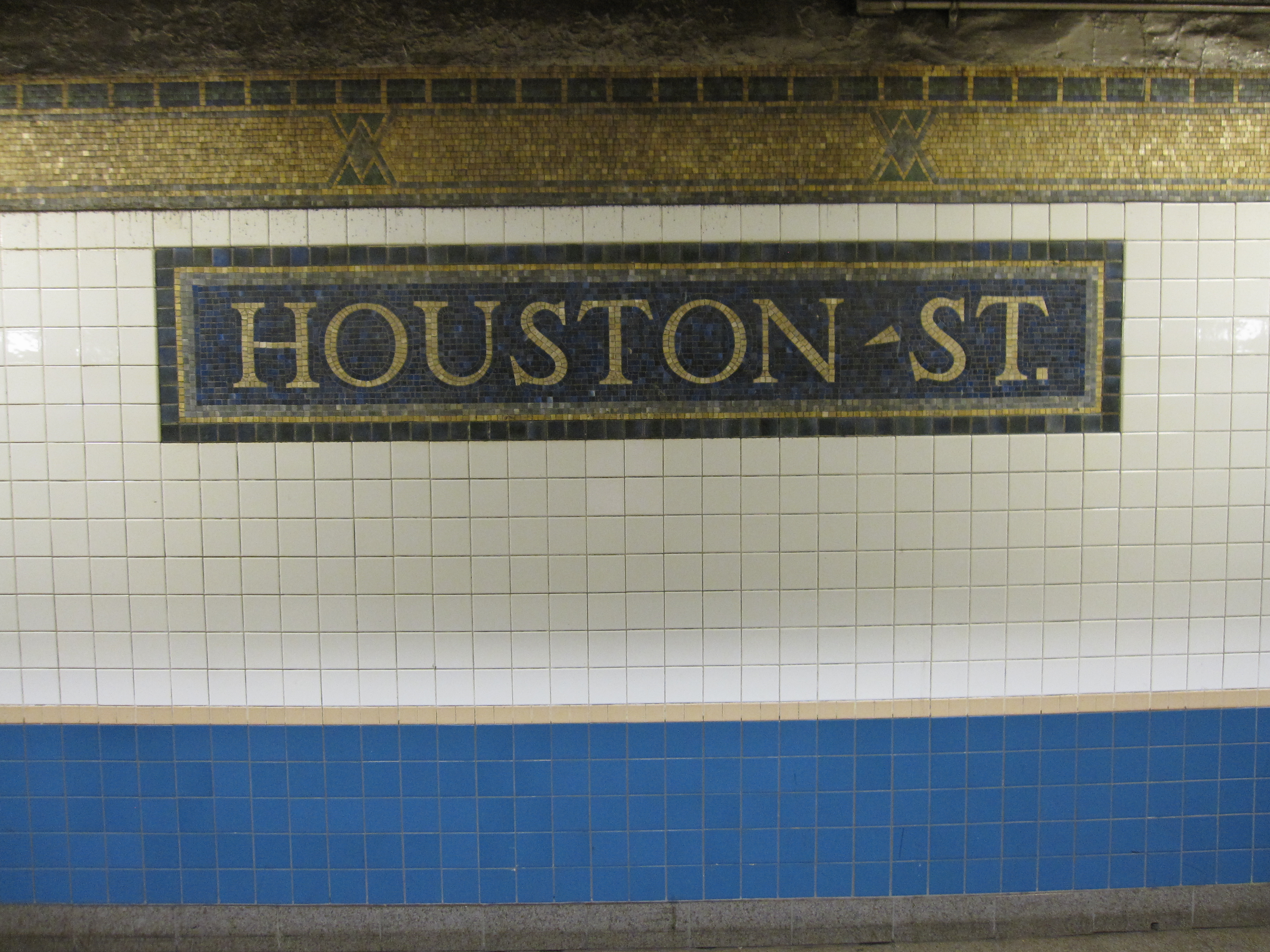
Name Tablet and trim line

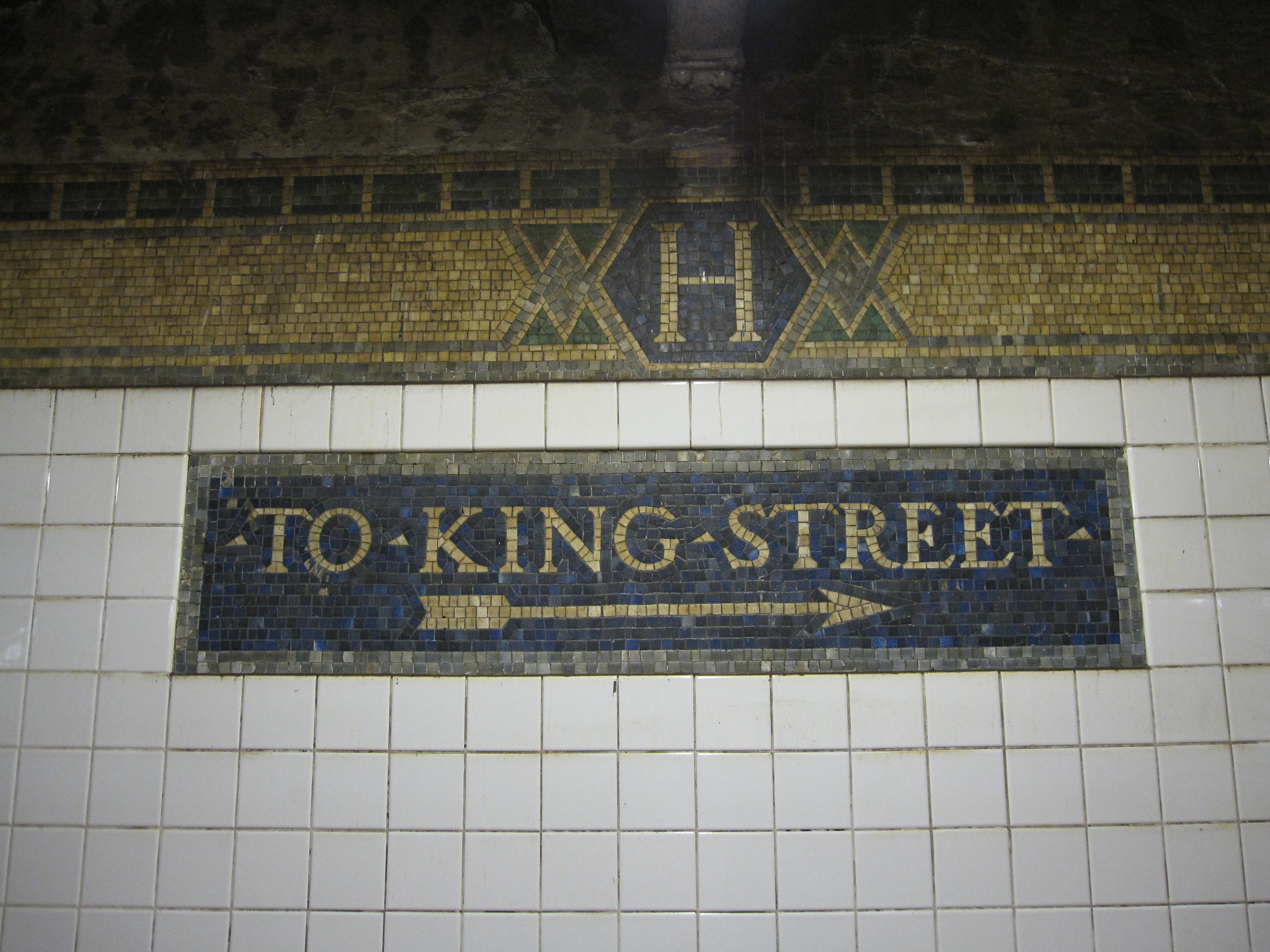
Directional and trim line tablets

The Dual Contracts, which were signed on March 19, 1913, were contracts for the construction and/or rehabilitation and operation of rapid transit lines in the City of New York. The contracts were "dual" in that they were signed between the City and two separate private companies (the Interborough Rapid Transit Company and the Brooklyn Rapid Transit Company), all working together to make the construction of the Dual Contracts possible. The Dual Contracts promised the construction of several lines in Brooklyn. As part of Contract 4, the IRT agreed to build a branch of the original subway line south down Seventh Avenue, Varick Street, and West Broadway to serve the West Side of Manhattan.

The construction of this line, in conjunction with the construction of the Lexington Avenue Line, would change the operations of the IRT system. Instead of having trains go via Broadway, turning onto 42nd Street, before finally turning onto Park Avenue, there would be two trunk lines connected by the 42nd Street Shuttle. The system would be changed from looking like a "Z" system on a map to an "H" system. One trunk would run via the new Lexington Avenue Line down Park Avenue, and the other trunk would run via the new Seventh Avenue Line up Broadway. In order for the line to continue down Varick Street and West Broadway, these streets needed to be widened, and two new streets were built, the Seventh Avenue Extension and the Varick Street Extension. It was predicted that the subway extension would lead to the growth of the Lower West Side, and to neighborhoods such as Chelsea and Greenwich Village.

Houston Street opened as part of an extension of the line from 34th Street–Penn Station to South Ferry on July 1, 1918. Initially, the station was served by a shuttle running from Times Square to South Ferry. The new "H" system was implemented on August 1, 1918, joining the two halves of the Broadway–Seventh Avenue Line and sending all West Side trains south from Times Square. An immediate result of the switch was the need to transfer using the 42nd Street Shuttle in order to retrace the original layout. The completion of the "H" system doubled the capacity of the IRT system.

=== Later years ===
The city government took over the IRT's operations on June 12, 1940. On August 9, 1964, the New York City Transit Authority (NYCTA) announced the letting of a $7.6 million (equivalent to $78,894,850 in 2025) contract to lengthen platforms at stations on the Broadway—Seventh Avenue Line from Rector Street to 34th Street–Penn Station, including Houston Street, and stations from Central Park North–110th Street to 145th Street on the Lenox Avenue Line to allow express trains to be lengthened from nine-car trains to ten-car trains, and to lengthen locals from eight-car trains to ten-car trains. With the completion of this project, the NYCTA project to lengthen IRT stations to accommodate ten-car trains would be complete.

This station was renovated in 1994 by in-house forces. During mid-2026, when the adjacent portion of the Broadway–Seventh Avenue Line was closed during weekends, the MTA rehabilitated the Houston Street station.

== Station layout ==
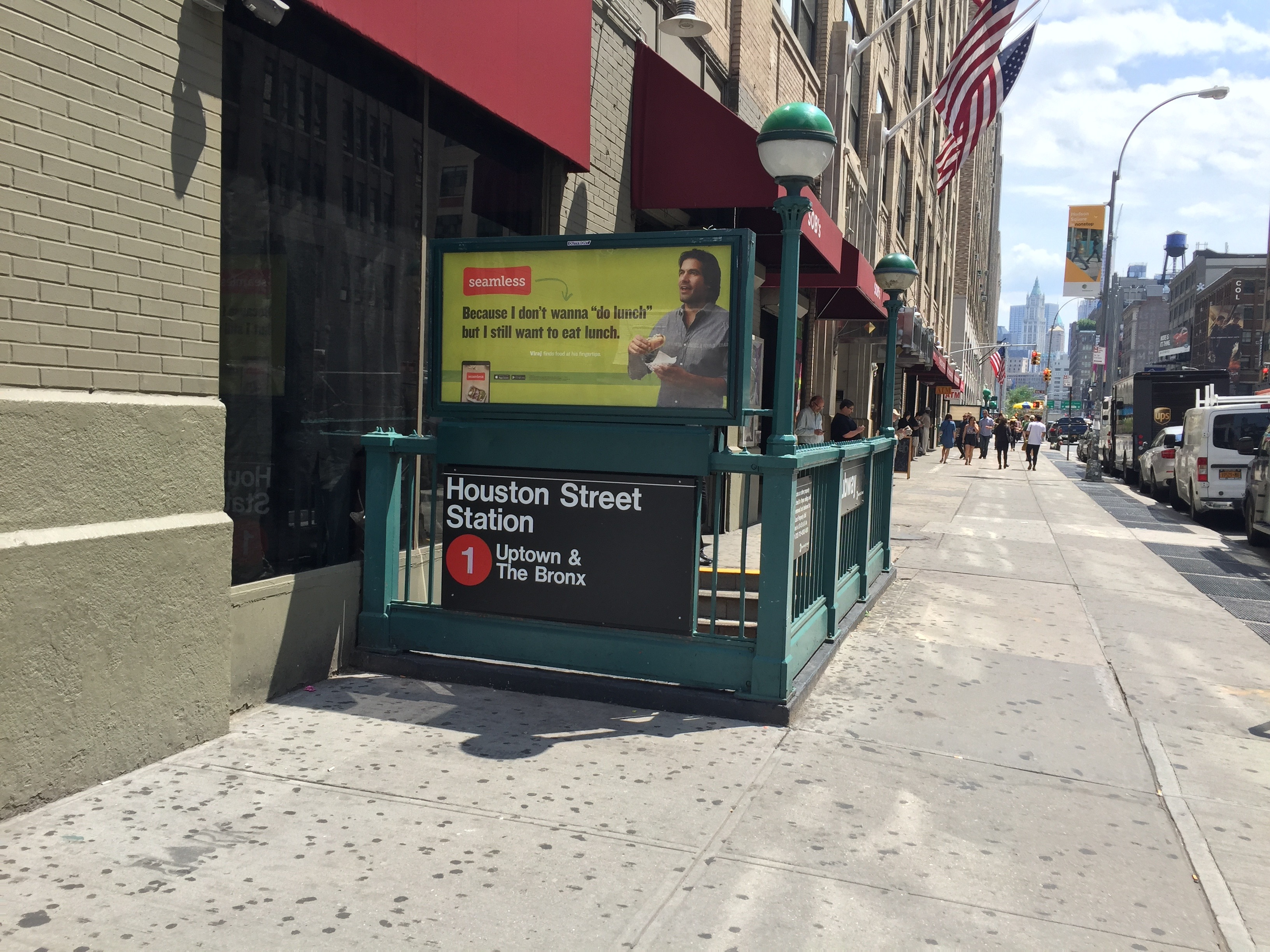
Northbound street stair

This underground station has two side platforms and four tracks. The station is served by the 1 at all times and by the 2 during late nights; the center express tracks are used by the 2 and 3 trains during daytime hours. The station is between Christopher Street–Sheridan Square to the north and Canal Street to the south.

In a fashion similar to the former 91st Street on the same line and 33rd Street on the Lexington Avenue Line, the two center tracks appears to descend within the confines of the station. As a result, the express tracks are at a lower elevation than the local tracks in the northern half of the station.

Both platforms have golden mosaic trim lines with blue and green borders and "H" tablets on a light blue background at regular intervals. The large name tablets read "HOUSTON ST." in gold font on a dark blue background and gold border. There are also directional tablets in the same style. Yellow I-beam columns run along both platforms at regular intervals with alternating ones having the standard black station name plate with white Helvetica lettering.

The station's artwork, installed during a 1994 in-house renovation, is entitled Platform Diving by Deborah Brown. It consists of murals on both platforms depicting sea creatures in an underwater subway system.

=== Exits ===
All fare control areas in this station are at platform level and there are no crossovers or crossunders. On both sides, a turnstile bank leads to a two staircases going up to West Houston and Varick Streets, either western corners on the South Ferry-bound side and either eastern corners on the Bronx-bound side. Only the Bronx-bound side has a token booth; the South Ferry-bound side is unstaffed.

Both platforms have an unstaffed secondary fare control area towards their south ends. Two high entry/exit turnstiles and one exit-only turnstile leads to two staircases going up to Varick and King Streets, either western corners on the South Ferry-bound side and either eastern corners on the Bronx-bound side.
