= Canal Street station (IRT Broadway–Seventh Avenue Line) =

New York City Subway station in Manhattan

Canal Street
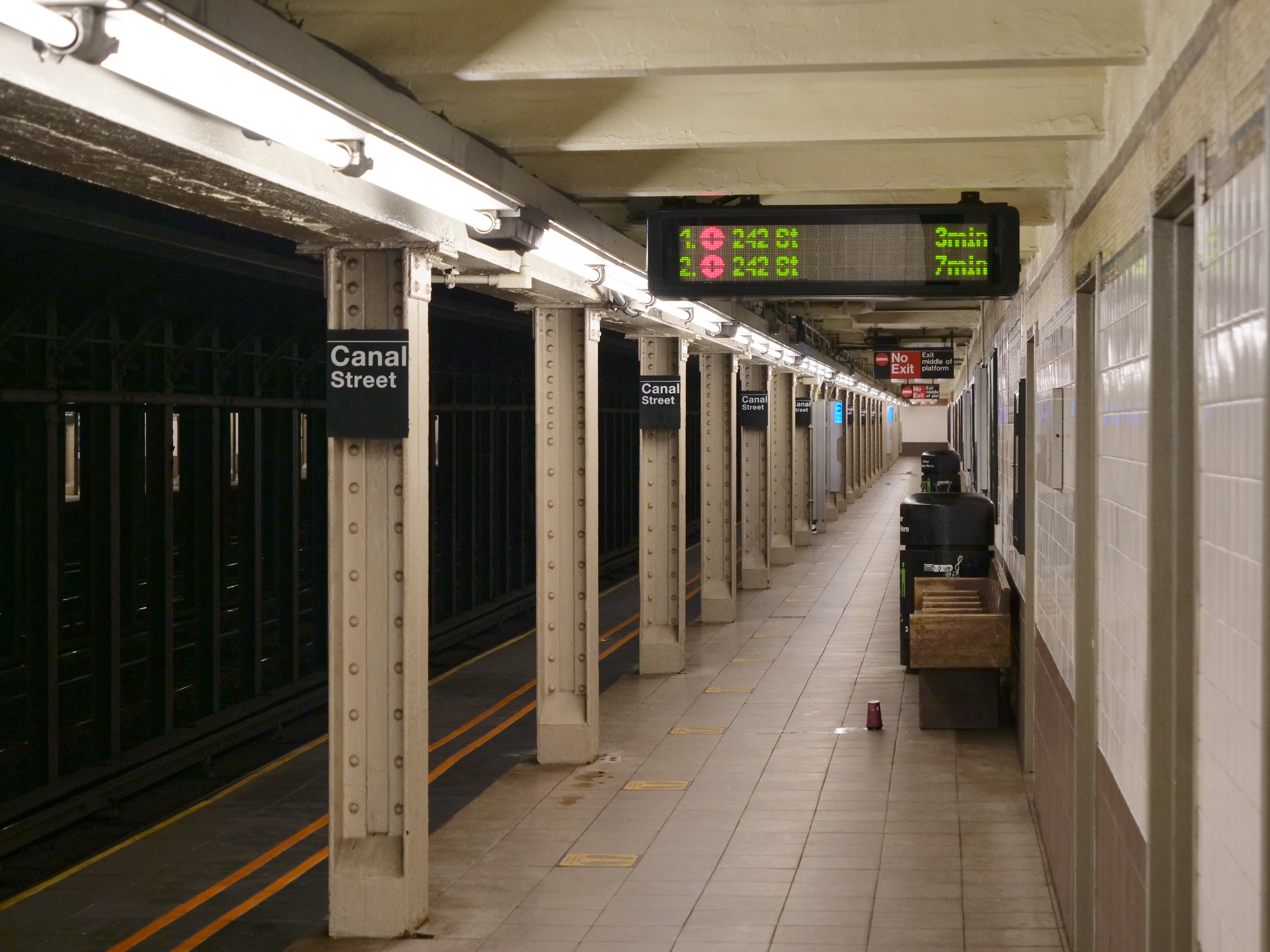
- Northbound platform

Station statistics
- Address: Canal Street & Varick Street; New York, New York
- Borough: Manhattan
- Locale: SoHo, Tribeca, Hudson Square
- Coordinates: 40.7226°N 74.0063°W
- Division: A (IRT)
- Line: IRT Broadway–Seventh Avenue Line
- Services: 1 (all times); 2 (late nights)
- Transit: NYCT Bus: M20
- Structure: Underground
- Platforms: 2 side platforms
- Tracks: 4

Other information
- Opened: July 1, 1918; 108 years ago
- Accessible: No; planned

Traffic
- 2025: 1,318,662 ▲10.9%
- Rank: 256 out of 423
Services
Preceding station	New York City Subway	Following station
Houston Street 1 2 toward Van Cortlandt Park–242nd Street	Local	Franklin Street 1 2 toward South Ferry
does not stop here
Location
Location within New York City Subway
Location within New York City
Location within New York
Track layout
Street map
Station service legend
Symbol	Description
Stops all times	Stops all times
Stops late nights only	Stops late nights only
Stops late nights and weekends	Stops late nights and weekends

The Canal Street station is a local station on the IRT Broadway–Seventh Avenue Line of the New York City Subway, located at the intersection of Canal and Varick Streets in the TriBeCa and SoHo neighborhoods of Manhattan, it is served by the 1 train at all times and by the 2 train during late nights.

The station was built by the Interborough Rapid Transit Company (IRT) as part of the Dual Contracts with New York City, and opened on July 1, 1918. The station had its platforms extended in the 1960s, and was renovated in 1992.

== History ==
=== Construction and opening ===
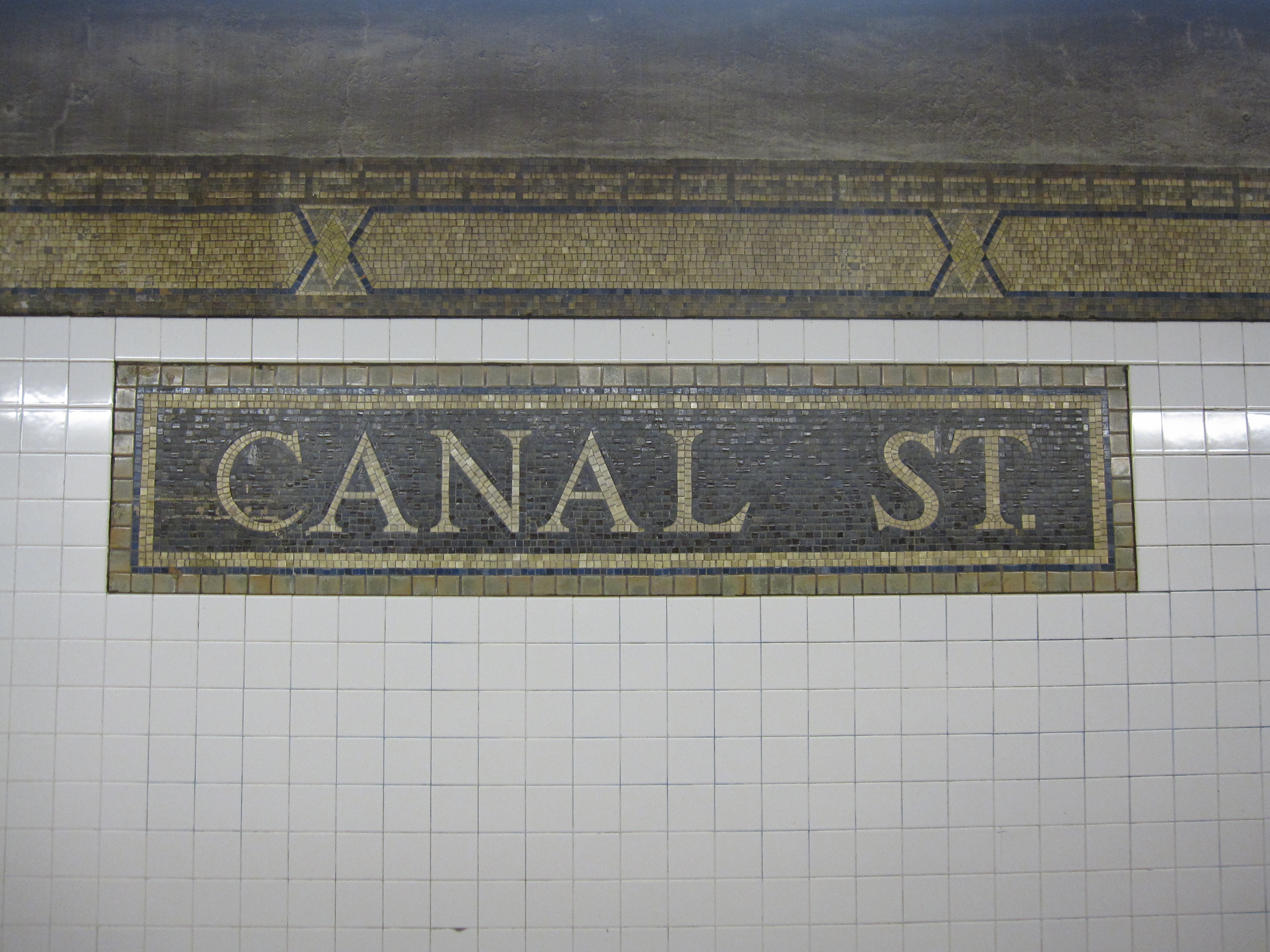
Mosaic name tablet

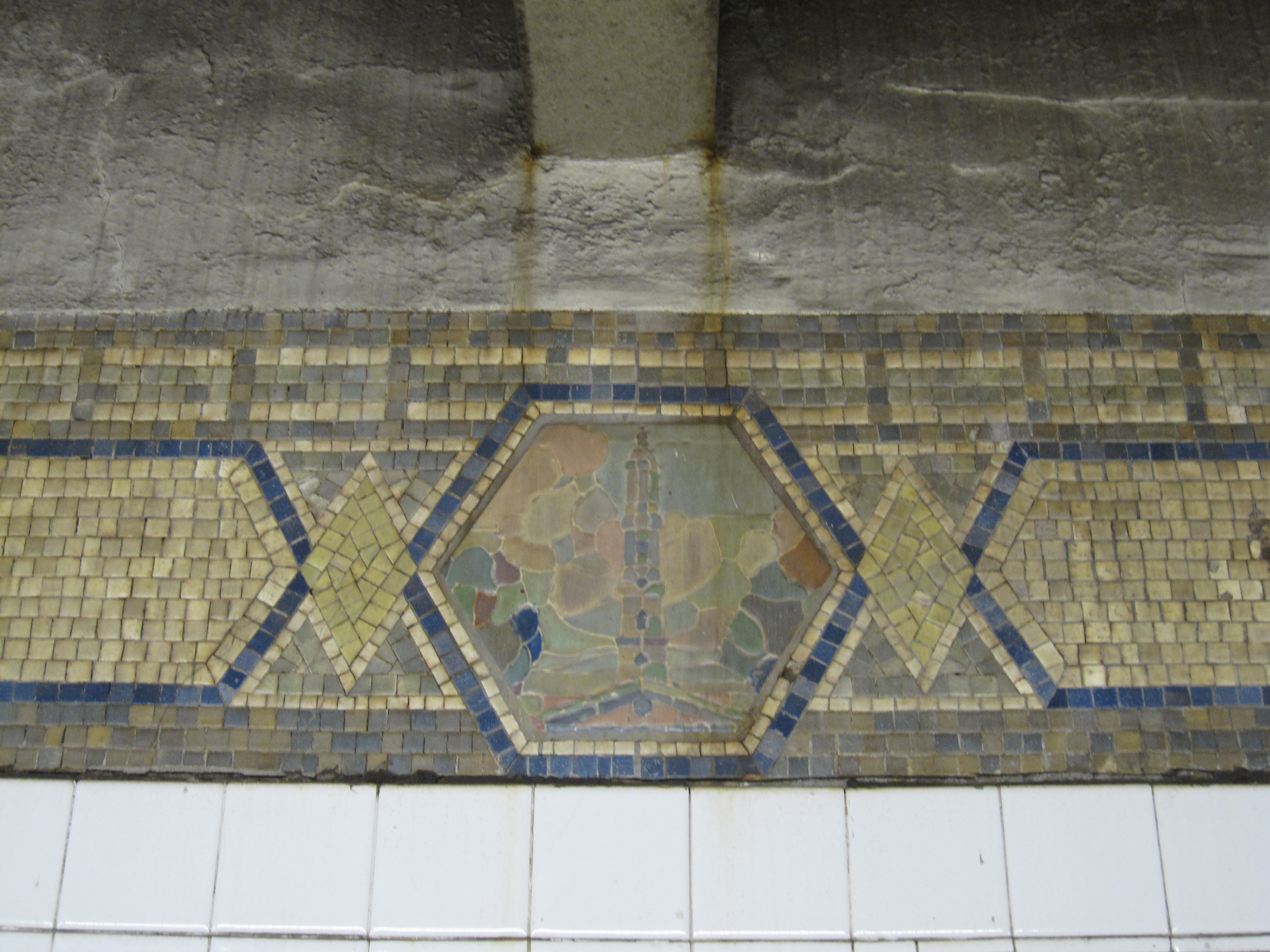
Mosaic of St. John's Chapel

The Dual Contracts, which were signed on March 19, 1913, were contracts for the construction and/or rehabilitation and operation of rapid transit lines in the City of New York. The contracts were "dual" in that they were signed between the City and two separate private companies (the Interborough Rapid Transit Company and the Brooklyn Rapid Transit Company), all working together to make the construction of the Dual Contracts possible. The Dual Contracts promised the construction of several lines in Brooklyn. As part of Contract 4, the IRT agreed to build a branch of the original subway line south down Seventh Avenue, Varick Street, and West Broadway to serve the West Side of Manhattan.

The construction of this line, in conjunction with the construction of the Lexington Avenue Line, would change the operations of the IRT system. Instead of having trains go via Broadway, turning onto 42nd Street, before finally turning onto Park Avenue, there would be two trunk lines connected by the 42nd Street Shuttle. The system would be changed from looking like a "Z" system on a map to an "H" system. One trunk would run via the new Lexington Avenue Line down Park Avenue, and the other trunk would run via the new Seventh Avenue Line up Broadway. In order for the line to continue down Varick Street and West Broadway, these streets needed to be widened, and two new streets were built, the Seventh Avenue Extension and the Varick Street Extension. It was predicted that the subway extension would lead to the growth of the Lower West Side, and to neighborhoods such as Chelsea and Greenwich Village.

Canal Street opened as part of an extension of the line from 34th Street–Penn Station to South Ferry on July 1, 1918. Initially, the station was served by a shuttle running from Times Square to South Ferry. The new "H" system was implemented on August 1, 1918, joining the two halves of the Broadway–Seventh Avenue Line and sending all West Side trains south from Times Square. An immediate result of the switch was the need to transfer using the 42nd Street Shuttle in order to retrace the original layout. The completion of the "H" system doubled the capacity of the IRT system.

=== Station renovations ===
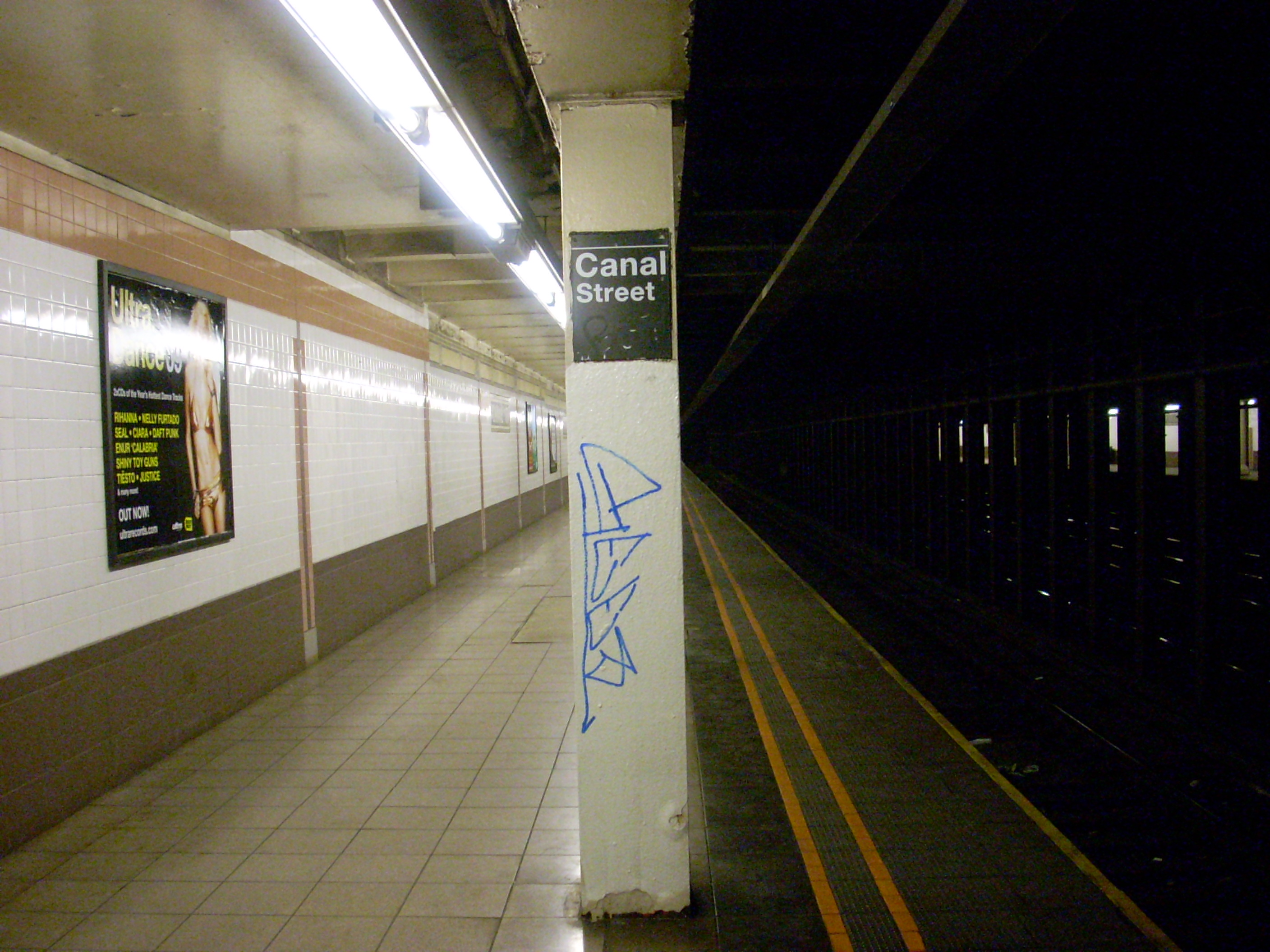
View of the transition between the 1960s-era platform extension and the original station

To make room for the construction of the Holland Tunnel exit plaza, a subway entrance at the station was reconstructed. In 1926, New York City, the New York State Bridge and Tunnel Commission, and the New Jersey Interstate Bridge and Tunnel Commission, reached an agreement to construct a passageway from the south side of Canal Street to the south side of Laight Street on the east side of Varick Street to replace the entrance. The cost of the project was split between the Bridge and Tunnel Commissions and the City, and was the first project done to separate pedestrian and vehicular traffic. Work on the project was underway in 1927. Pattelli & Wilson got the winning bid of $116,723 to construct the project.

The city government took over the IRT's operations on June 12, 1940. On August 9, 1964, the New York City Transit Authority (NYCTA) announced the letting of a $7.6 million contract to lengthen platforms at stations on the Broadway—Seventh Avenue Line from Rector Street to 34th Street–Penn Station, including Canal Street, and stations from Central Park North–110th Street to 145th Street on the Lenox Avenue Line to allow express trains to be lengthened from nine-car trains to ten-car trains, and to lengthen locals from eight-car trains to ten-car trains. With the completion of this project, the NYCTA project to lengthen IRT stations to accommodate ten-car trains would be complete.

The station was renovated in 1992 by MTA New York City Transit's in-house staff, and the passageway and the two staircases to the corner of Laight Street and Varick Street were closed.

As part of its 2025–2029 Capital Program, the MTA has proposed making the station wheelchair-accessible in compliance with the Americans with Disabilities Act of 1990. An elevator easement to the northbound platform was previously proposed as part of the construction of a neighboring building at 2 Hudson Square.

== Station layout ==
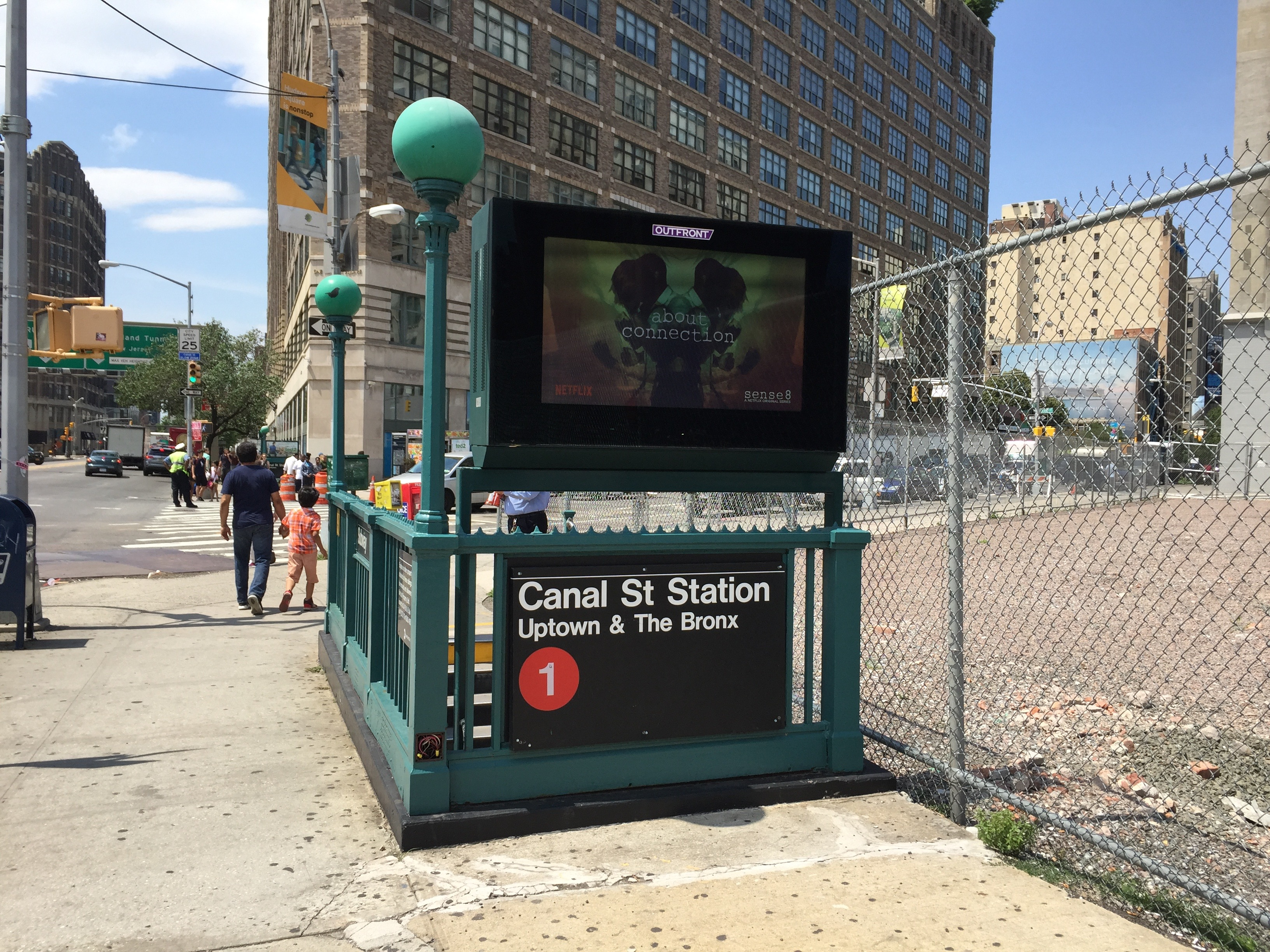
One of the two staircases to the uptown platform from the northeast corner of Canal and Varick Streets

This station has two side platforms and four tracks. The station is served by the 1 at all times and by the 2 during late nights; the center express tracks are used by the 2 and 3 trains during daytime hours. The station is between Houston Street to the north and Franklin Street to the south. The platforms are mildly offset, and although there are no crossovers or crossunders to allow free transfers between directions, there is evidence of a sealed crossunder on both of the platforms. Beige I-beam columns run along both platforms, alternating ones having the standard black station name plate with white lettering.

This underground station is located on the street of the same name, which is the boundary of SoHo and Tribeca. Lying within a block of three different pocket parks (St. John's Park, Duane Park, and Cavala Park), the station sits at the entrance to the Holland Tunnel outside of the Tribeca North Historic District. Much of the surrounding area is characterized by its historic loft architecture.

=== Exits ===
Fare control is on platform level for both sides. The two northbound street stairs are on the northeast corner of Varick Street and Canal Street, and the two southbound street stairs are on the northwest corner. The northeast-corner entrances have been floodproofed. At the end of the uptown platform, there was a free zone passageway that had two staircases to Laight and Varick Streets; it was not monitored and was closed down for security reasons.
