= Franklin Street station (IRT Broadway–Seventh Avenue Line) =

New York City Subway station in Manhattan

Franklin Street
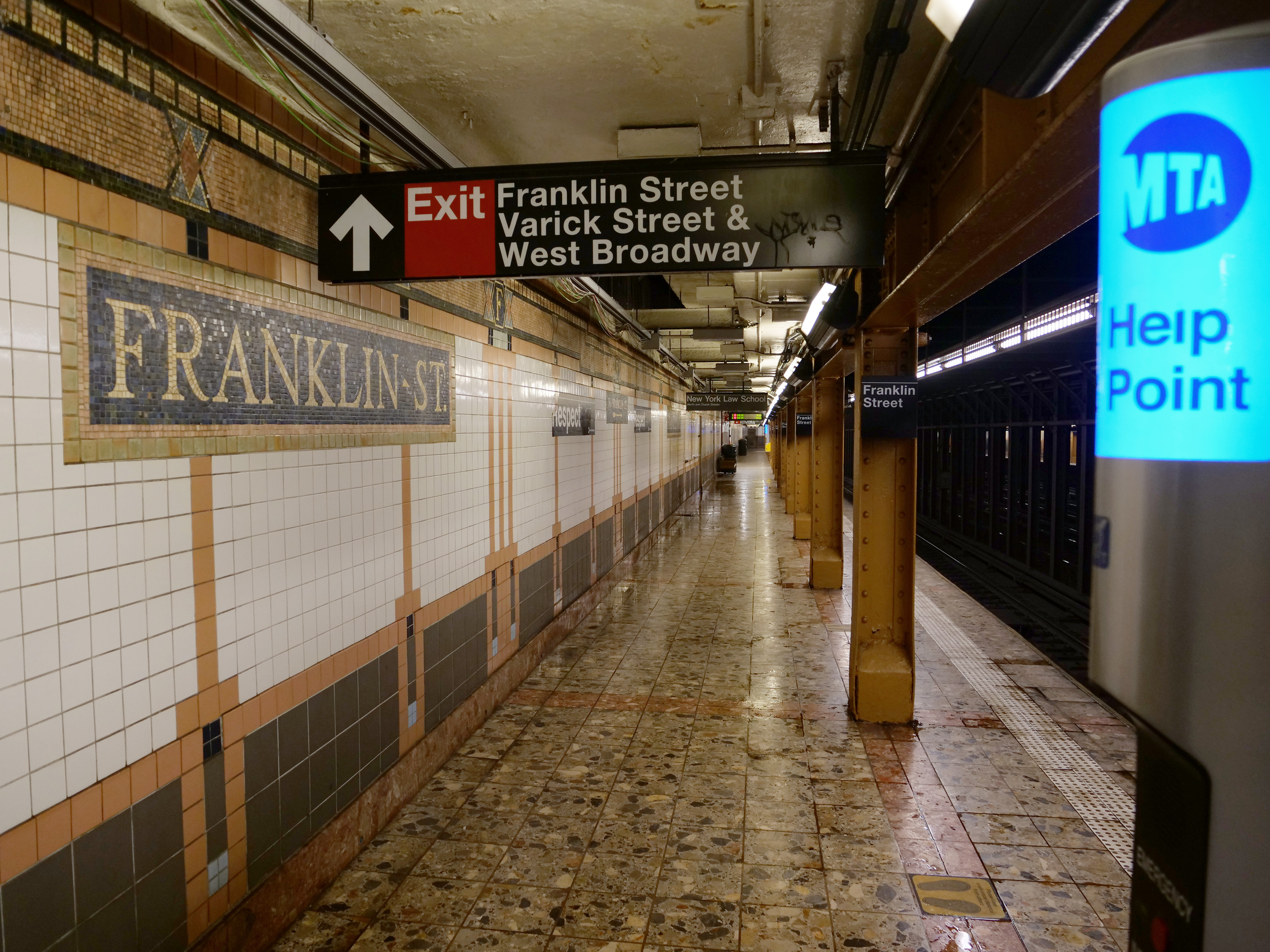
- Northbound platform

Station statistics
- Address: Franklin Street & Varick Street; New York, New York
- Borough: Manhattan
- Locale: Tribeca
- Coordinates: 40.719°N 74.007°W
- Division: A (IRT)
- Line: IRT Broadway–Seventh Avenue Line
- Services: 1 (all times); 2 (late nights)
- Transit: NYCT Bus: M20; NJT Bus: 120
- Structure: Underground
- Platforms: 2 side platforms
- Tracks: 4

Other information
- Opened: July 1, 1918; 108 years ago

Traffic
- 2025: 1,491,202 ▲6.3%
- Rank: 229 out of 423
Services
Preceding station	New York City Subway	Following station
Canal Street 1 2 toward Van Cortlandt Park–242nd Street	Local	Chambers Street 1 2 toward South Ferry
does not stop here
Location
Location within New York City Subway
Location within New York City
Location within New York
Track layout
Street map
Station service legend
Symbol	Description
Stops all times	Stops all times
Stops late nights only	Stops late nights only
Stops late nights and weekends	Stops late nights and weekends

The Franklin Street station is a local station on the IRT Broadway–Seventh Avenue Line of the New York City Subway, located at the intersection of Franklin Street, Varick Street, and West Broadway, in the TriBeCa neighborhood of Manhattan, it is served by the 1 train at all times and by the 2 train during late nights.

The station was built by the Interborough Rapid Transit Company (IRT) as part of the Dual Contracts with New York City, and opened on July 1, 1918. The station had its platforms extended in the 1960s, and was renovated in the early 1990s.

== History ==
=== Construction and opening ===
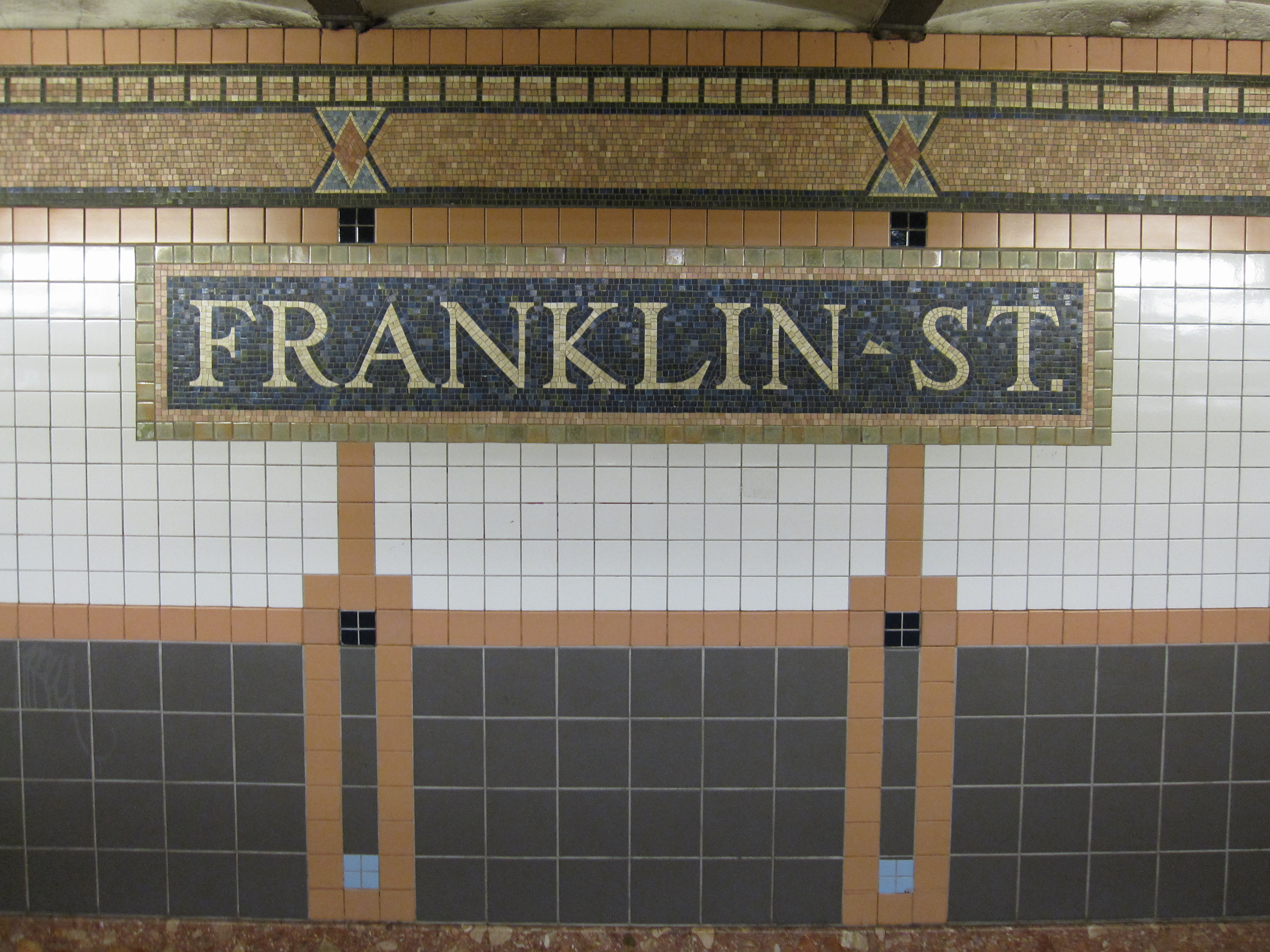
Mosaic name tablet

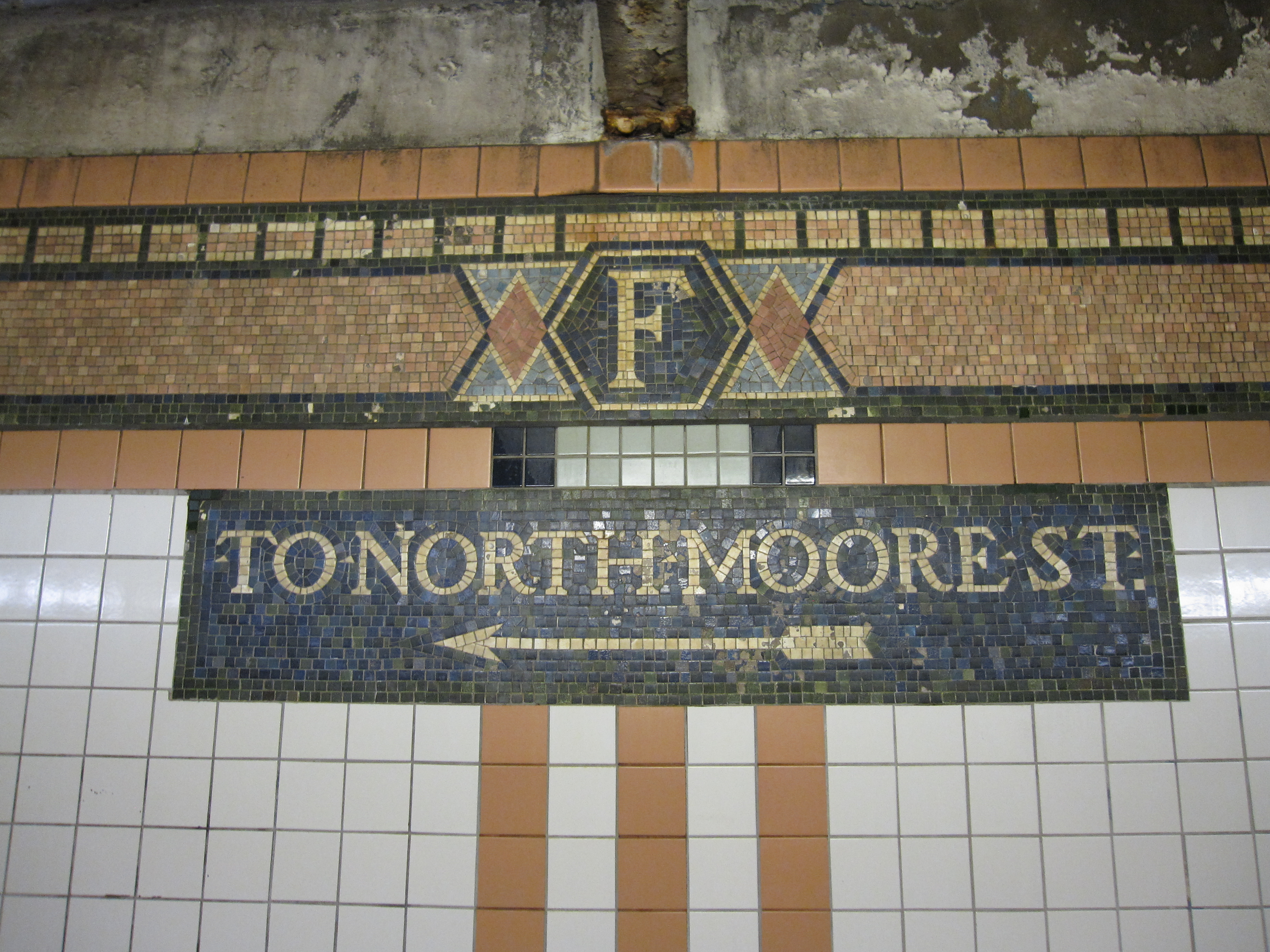
Mosaic directional tablet to North Moore Street

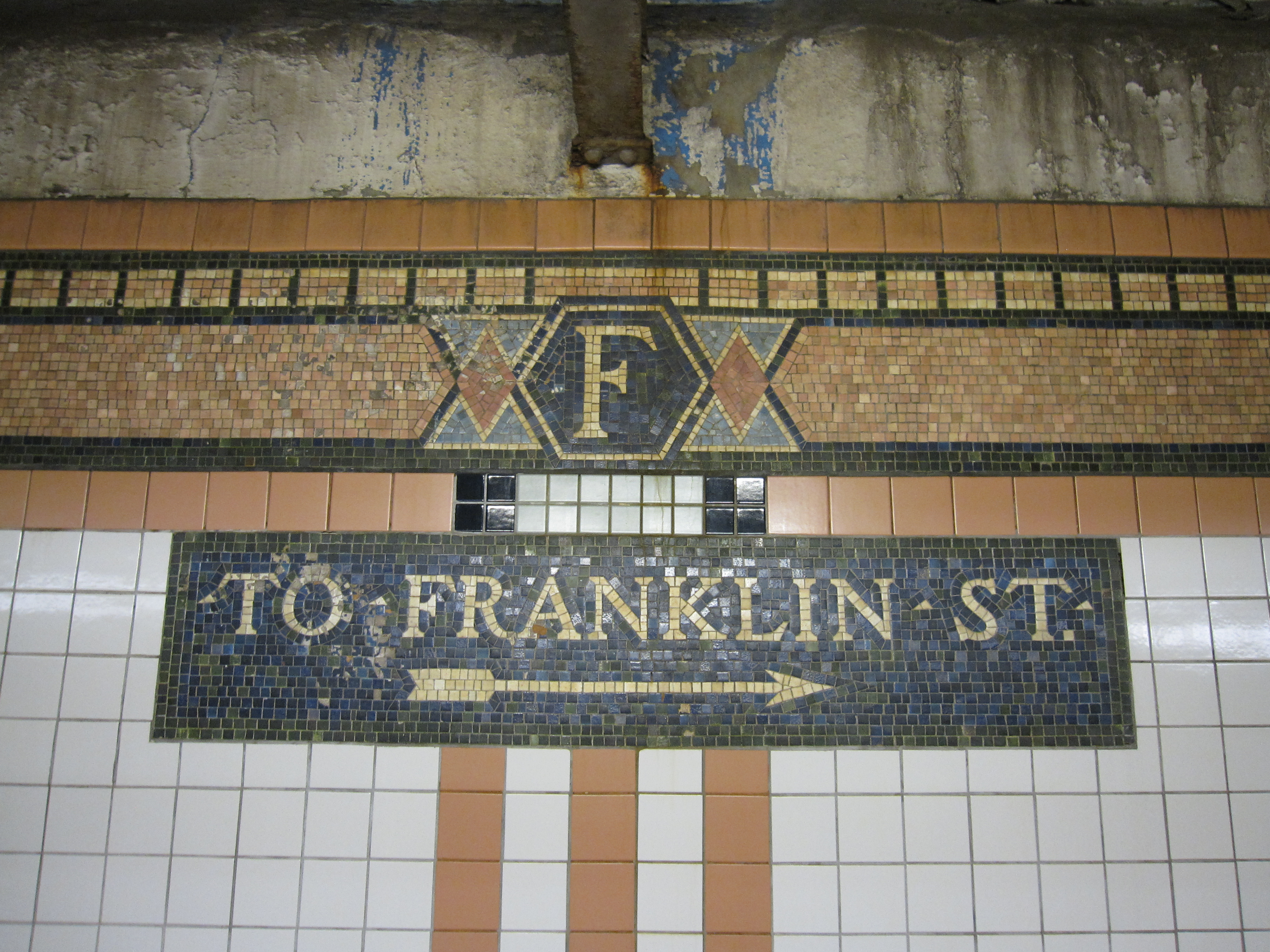
Mosaic directional tablet to Franklin Street

The Dual Contracts, which were signed on March 19, 1913, were contracts for the construction and/or rehabilitation and operation of rapid transit lines in the City of New York. The contracts were "dual" in that they were signed between the City and two separate private companies (the Interborough Rapid Transit Company and the Brooklyn Rapid Transit Company), all working together to make the construction of the Dual Contracts possible. The Dual Contracts promised the construction of several lines in Brooklyn. As part of Contract 4, the IRT agreed to build a branch of the original subway line south down Seventh Avenue, Varick Street, and West Broadway to serve the West Side of Manhattan.

The construction of this line, in conjunction with the construction of the Lexington Avenue Line, would change the operations of the IRT system. Instead of having trains go via Broadway, turning onto 42nd Street, before finally turning onto Park Avenue, there would be two trunk lines connected by the 42nd Street Shuttle. The system would be changed from looking like a "Z" system on a map to an "H" system. One trunk would run via the new Lexington Avenue Line down Park Avenue, and the other trunk would run via the new Seventh Avenue Line up Broadway. In order for the line to continue down Varick Street and West Broadway, these streets needed to be widened, and two new streets were built, the Seventh Avenue Extension and the Varick Street Extension. It was predicted that the subway extension would lead to the growth of the Lower West Side, and to neighborhoods such as Chelsea and Greenwich Village.

Franklin Street opened as part of an extension of the line from 34th Street–Penn Station to South Ferry on July 1, 1918. Initially, the station was served by a shuttle running from Times Square to South Ferry. The new "H" system was implemented on August 1, 1918, joining the two halves of the Broadway–Seventh Avenue Line and sending all West Side trains south from Times Square. An immediate result of the switch was the need to transfer using the 42nd Street Shuttle in order to retrace the original layout. The completion of the "H" system doubled the capacity of the IRT system.

=== Later years ===
The city government took over the IRT's operations on June 12, 1940. On August 9, 1964, the New York City Transit Authority (NYCTA) announced the letting of a $7.6 million contract to lengthen platforms at stations on the Broadway—Seventh Avenue Line from Rector Street to 34th Street–Penn Station, including Franklin Street, and stations from Central Park North–110th Street to 145th Street on the Lenox Avenue Line to allow express trains to be lengthened from nine-car trains to ten-car trains, and to lengthen locals from eight-car trains to ten-car trains. With the completion of this project, the NYCTA project to lengthen IRT stations to accommodate ten-car trains would be complete.

The station was renovated in the early 1990s.

When Aretha Franklin died on August 16, 2018, the Metropolitan Transportation Authority pasted sticker signs with the word "Respect" on the walls of the Franklin Street station, as well as the Franklin Avenue station in Brooklyn. A Brooklyn resident had suggested adding the signs after impromptu tributes to Franklin had arisen at these two stations. The signs were supposed to be temporary, but, as of March 2023, they are still on the walls.

== Station layout ==
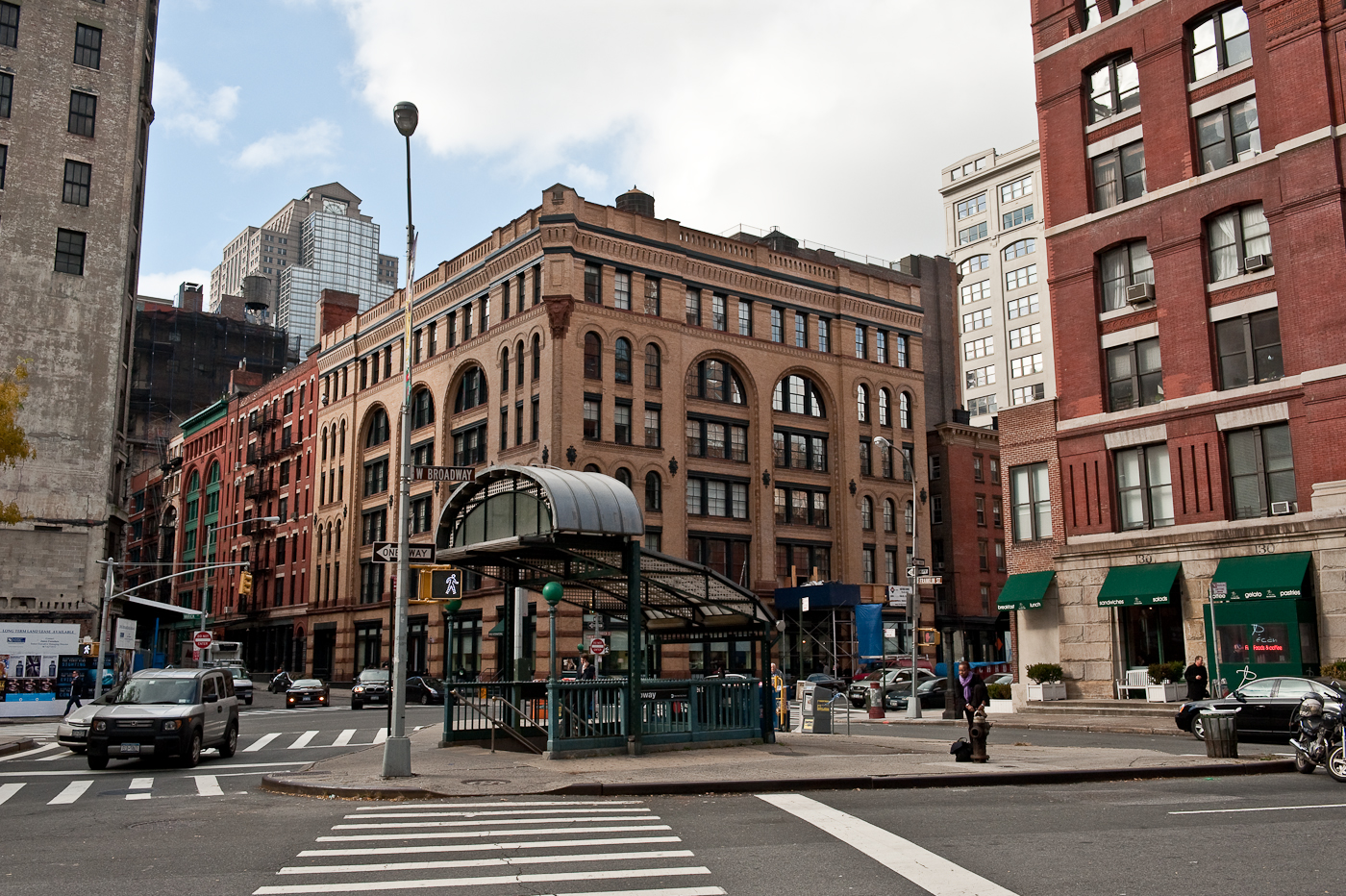
Uptown station entrance kiosk

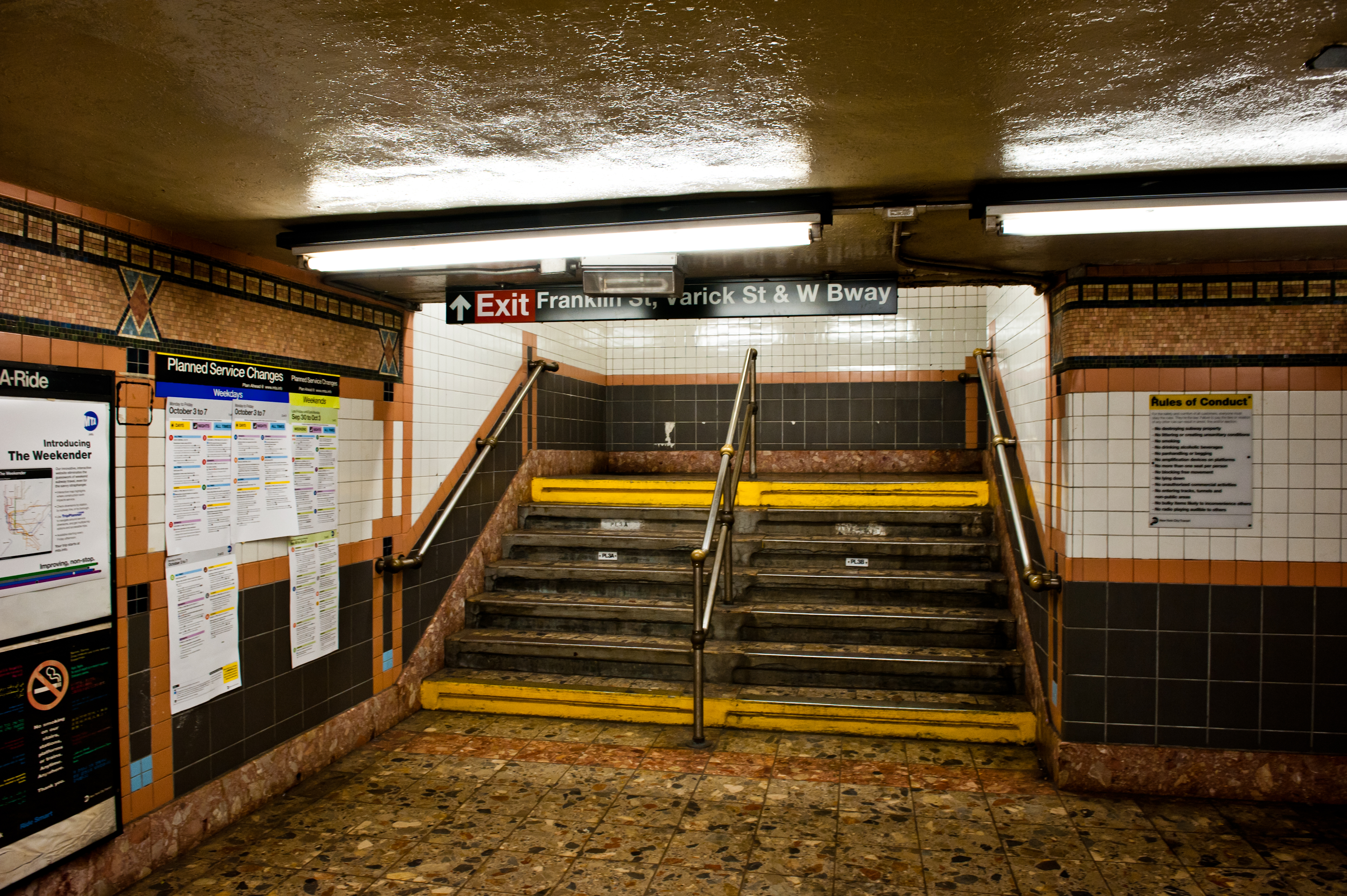
Staircase to the street

The station has two side platforms and four tracks with no crossover or crossunder. The station is served by the 1 at all times and by the 2 during late nights; the center express tracks are used by the 2 and 3 trains during daytime hours. The station is between Canal Street to the north and Chambers Street to the south.

There are "store window"-style art displays on the southbound platform and a faux-newsstand on the northbound side. Although the station's original wall tiling was replaced during renovations, its mosaic bands were kept; there are "Franklin Street" large mosaics, small "F" mosaics and directional mosaics "To Franklin St." and "To North Moore St." The floor tiles are rose and tan colored with light and dark splotches.

=== Exits ===
The full-time entrance is on the uptown side, on a traffic island where Varick Street and West Broadway meet. There is a kiosk reminiscent of the original IRT kiosks at 72nd Street and Bowling Green, but it was added during the station's renovation during the mid-1990s. There are two downtown street stair entrances on either western corner of Varick and Franklin Streets, but the booth is not staffed at all times. There are part-time high-exit turnstiles one block north, at both northern corners of Varick and North Moore Streets, on both the uptown and downtown sides.
