= M10 and M20 buses =

Bus routes in Manhattan, New York

m10, m20
- Eighth Avenue Line
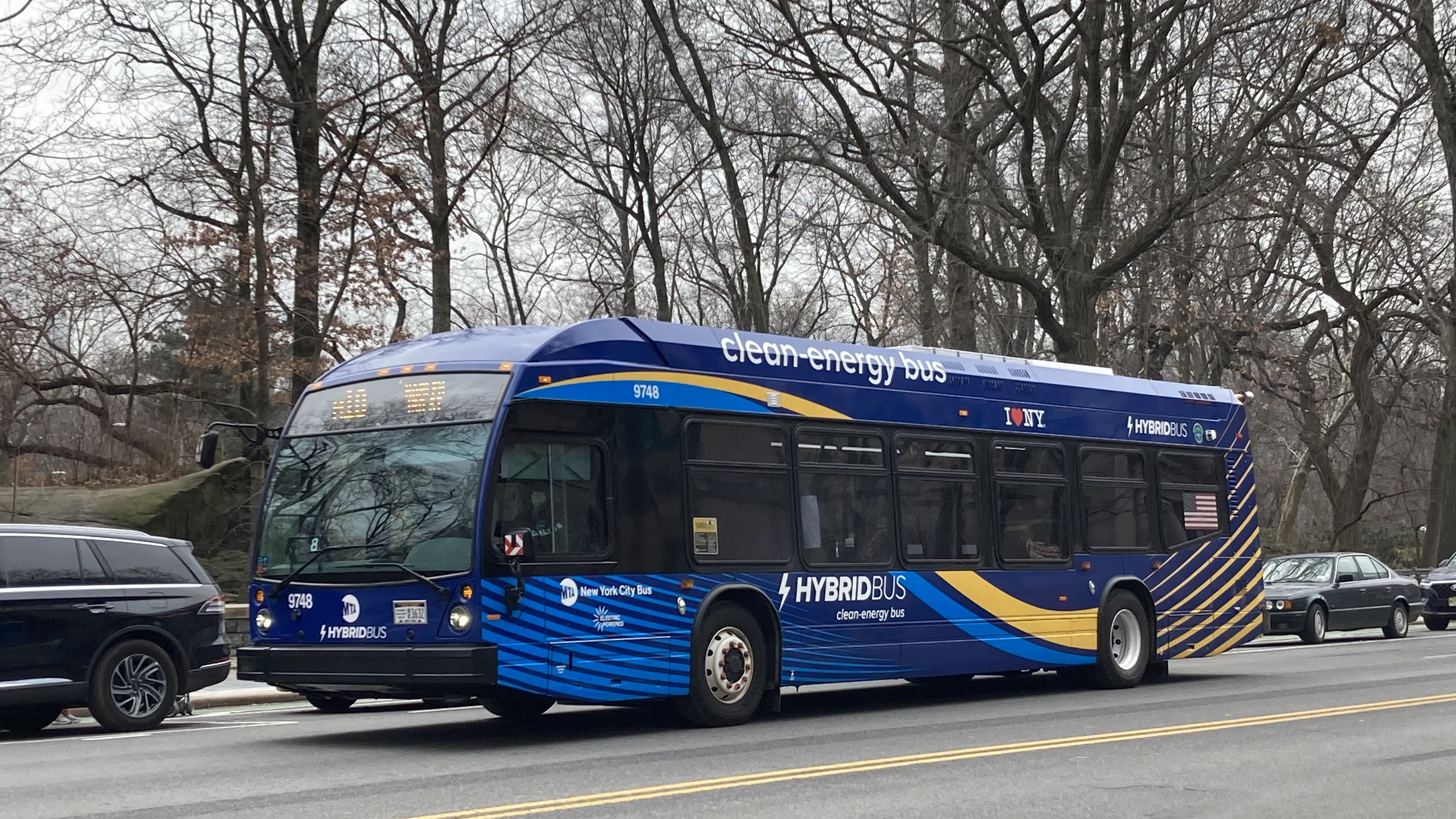
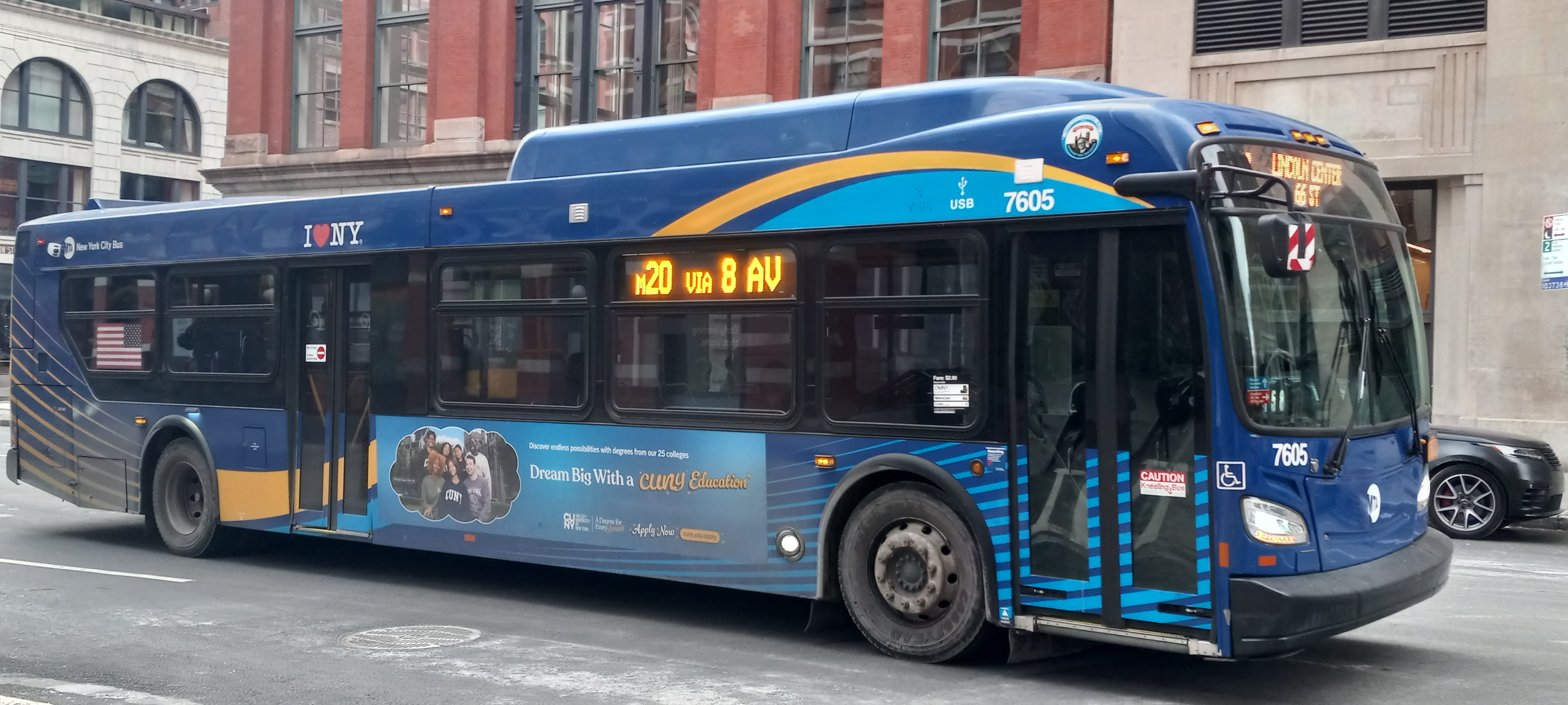
- A 2021 Nova Bus LFS HEV (9748) on the Harlem-bound M10 and a 2019 XD40 (7605) on the Lincoln Center-bound M20

Overview
- System: MTA Regional Bus Operations
- Operator: Manhattan and Bronx Surface Transit Operating Authority
- Garage: Manhattanville Depot (M10); Michael J. Quill Depot (M20)
- Vehicle: Orion VII NG HEV (M10 only); New Flyer Xcelsior XDE40 (M10 only); Nova Bus LFS HEV; New Flyer Xcelsior XD40 (M20 only); New Flyer Xcelsior XE40 (M20 only)
- Began service: 1852 (train); 1936 (bus); 2010 (current alignment)

Route
- Locale: Manhattan, New York, U.S.
- Start: M10: Harlem – 159th Street; M20: Lincoln Center - 66th Street
- Via: Frederick Douglass Boulevard (M10); Central Park West (M10); 7th, 8th Avenues (M20)
- End: M10: 57th Street / Broadway; M20: South Ferry
- Length: M10: 5.3 miles (8.5 km); M20: 6.2 miles (10.0 km)

Service
- Operates: 4:50 AM – 1:50 AM
- Annual patronage: 1,164,438 (M10, 2025); 493,509 (M20, 2025)
- Transfers: Yes
- Timetable: M10 M20

The Eighth Avenue Line is a public transit line in Manhattan, New York City, running mostly along Eighth Avenue from Lower Manhattan to Harlem. Originally a streetcar line, it is now the M10 bus route and the M20 bus route, operated by MaBSTOA as a subdivision of MTA Regional Bus Operations. The M10 bus now only runs north of 57th Street (near Columbus Circle), and the M20 runs south of 66th Street. The whole line was a single route, the M10, until 2000 when the M20 was created.

== Route description ==
The M10 and M20 bus routes serve the northern and southern halves of the Eighth Avenue corridor, respectively. The routes intersect in Upper Midtown Manhattan, between Lincoln Center and Columbus Circle. Until 2000, the two routes were a single M10 route, running 10 miles (16 km) between Harlem and Lower Manhattan.

=== M10 ===
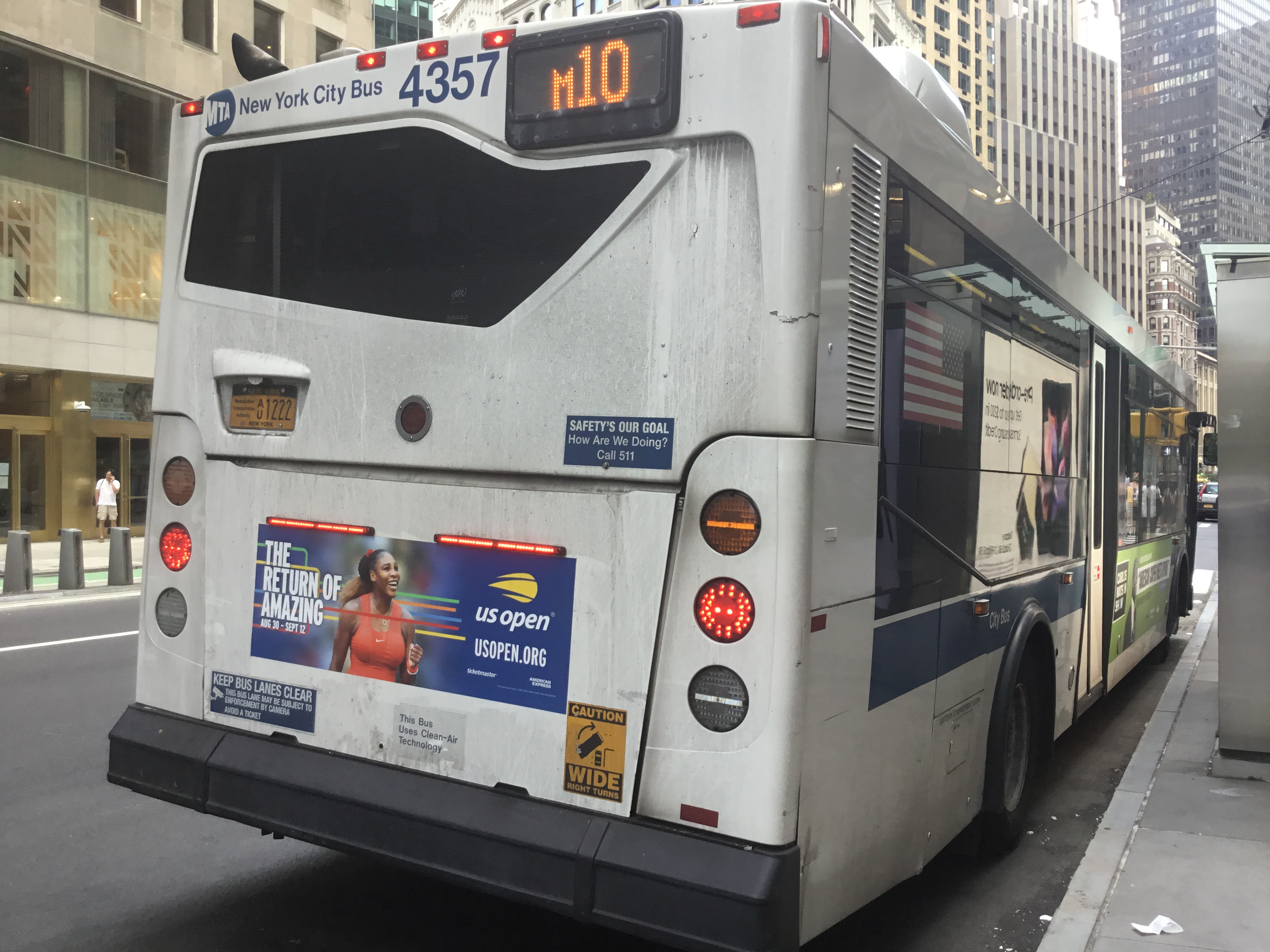
A 2009 Orion VII NG HEV (4357) on the M10

The M10 bus begins in Harlem at Frederick Douglass Boulevard (Eighth Avenue) roughly where 158th Street would be located, on the east side of the Polo Grounds Towers housing complex. There is no actual intersection with 158th Street at this point. The route travels south on Frederick Douglass Boulevard, which becomes Central Park West at West 110th Street and Frederick Douglass Circle. At West 63rd Street in Lincoln Center, southbound buses turn west, then turn south on Broadway, terminating at 57th Street and Broadway just south of Columbus Circle. Northbound buses travel along the entire length of Eighth Avenue towards Harlem. Prior to 2010, the M10 continued south to Penn Station at 34th Street.

=== M20 ===
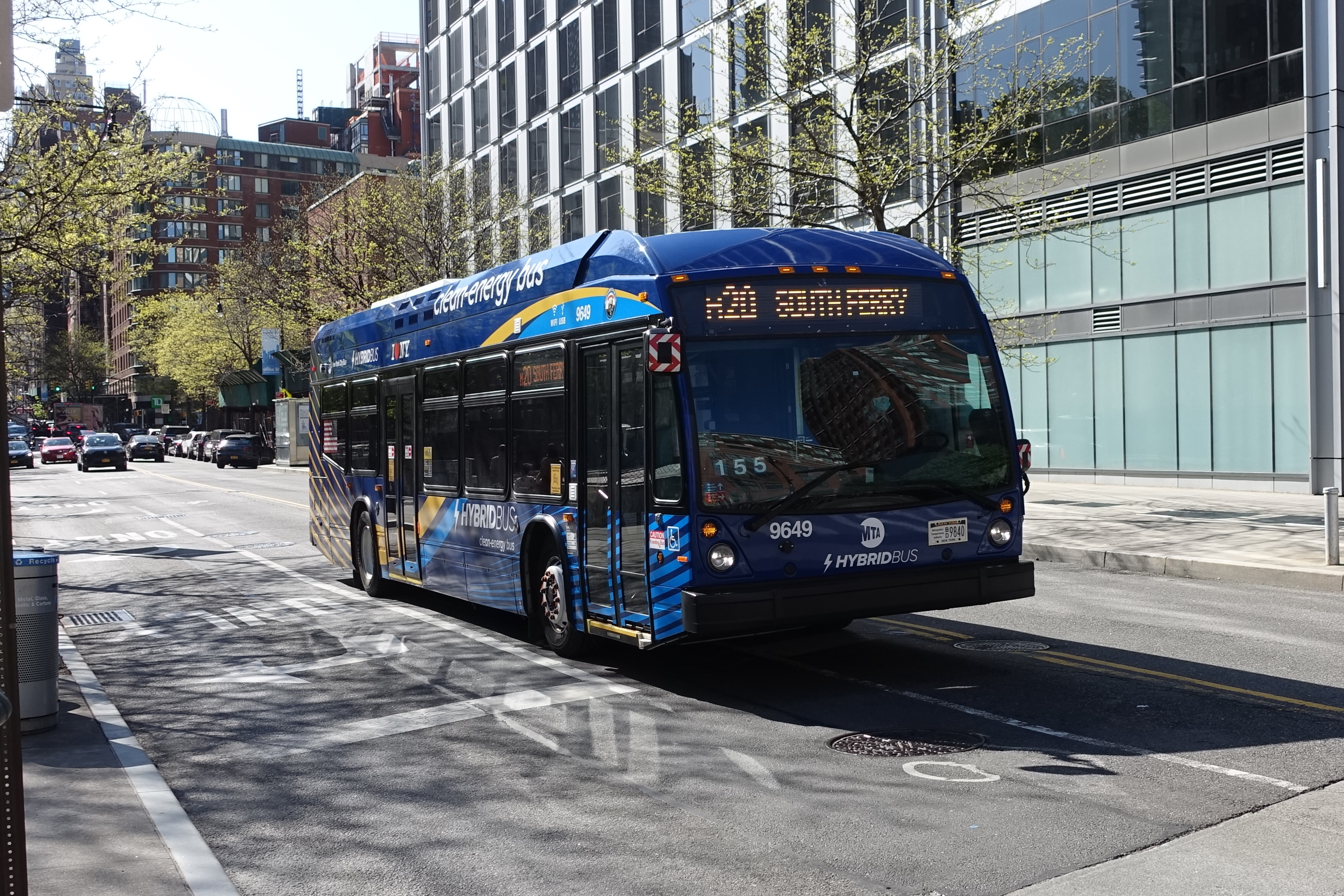
A 2021 Nova Bus LFS HEV (9649) on the South Ferry-bound M20 at Chambers/West Streets in April 2022

The M20 begins service at Broadway and West 63rd Street in Lincoln Center, at Dante Park. Southbound, the route travels through Columbus Circle, east along 59th Street, and south along Seventh Avenue, which becomes Seventh Avenue South and then Varick Street. At the end of Varick Street in Tribeca, the M20 runs south on West Broadway, then west along Chambers Street past West Street into Battery Park City. The route then travels along North End Avenue, Vesey Street, a short stretch of West Street, South End Avenue, Battery Place, and State Street. The route terminates at Whitehall Street along the Staten Island Ferry Whitehall Terminal bus loop.

Northbound M20 buses follow essentially the same route through Battery Park City, except using Murray Street instead of Vesey Street. At Chambers Street and West Street, the route turns north onto West Street, east on Harrison Street, then north onto Hudson Street. At Abingdon Square Park and Bleecker Park, Hudson Street feeds into Eighth Avenue, which the M20 follows into Midtown. At West 66th Street, the M20 turns west, then turns south on Broadway, terminating at West 63rd Street.

== History ==
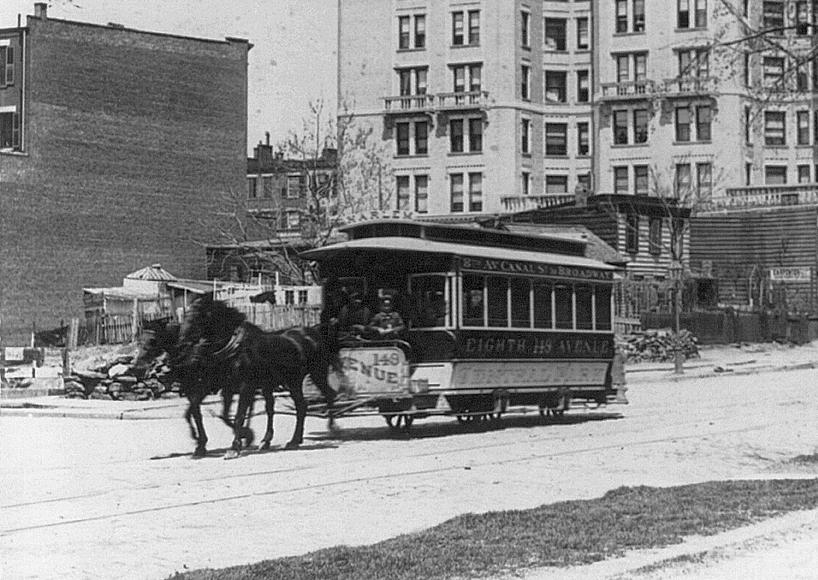
Eighth Avenue horsecar, 1895

=== Streetcar service ===
The Eighth Avenue Railroad opened the line from the north end of the trackage shared with the Sixth Avenue Railroad's Sixth Avenue Line at Canal Street and Varick Street along Canal Street, Hudson Street, and Eighth Avenue to 51st Street on August 30, 1852. It was eventually extended north to 159th Street, with a branch along Macomb's Lane to 154th Street, and another branch to the south along Canal Street east to Broadway.

=== Bus service ===
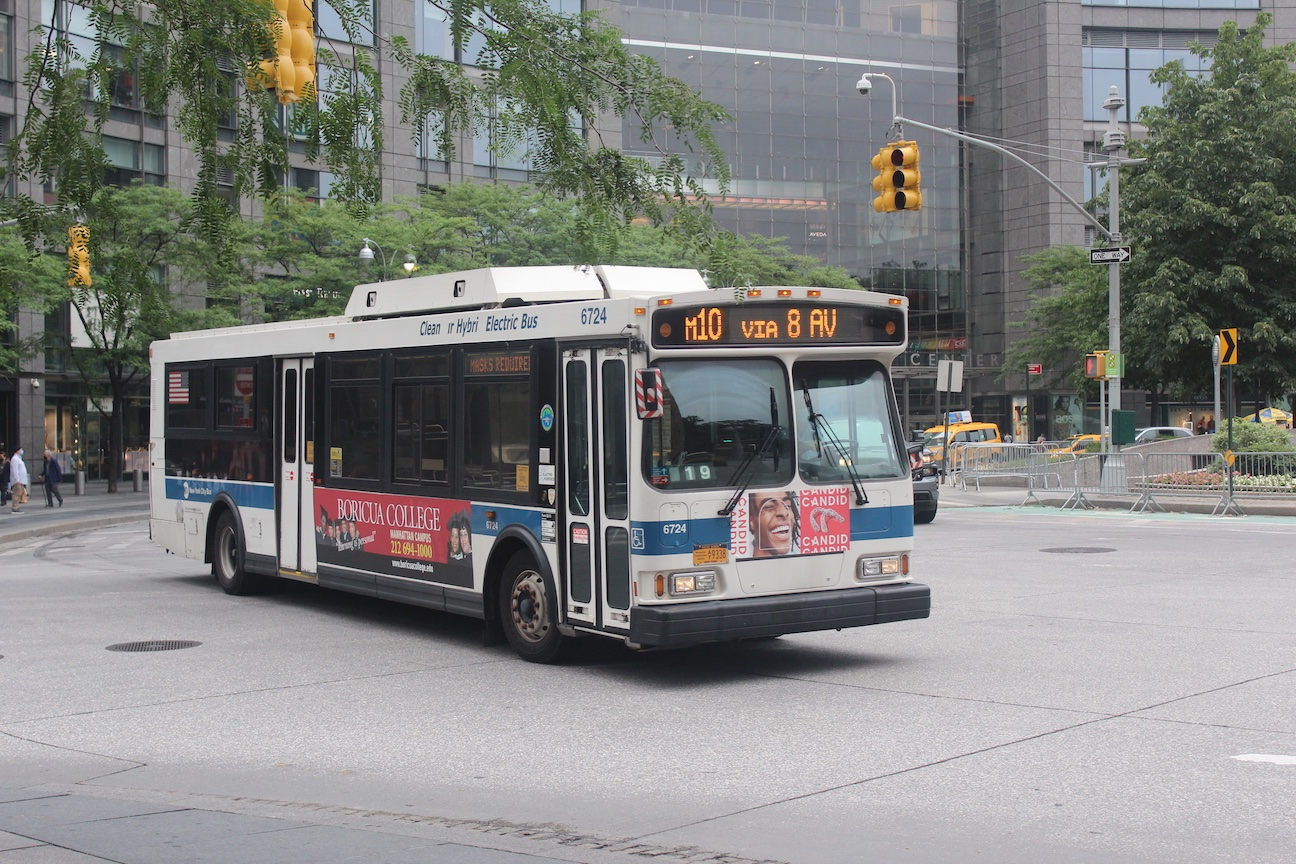
A 2006 Orion VII OG HEV (6724) on the M10 serving Columbus Circle.

Buses were substituted for streetcars by the Eighth Avenue Coach Corporation in March 1936, a company owned by Fifth Avenue Coach Company.

The New York City Omnibus Corporation took over operations of the route, known as Route 10, in 1951, and in 1956 it was renamed Fifth Avenue Coach Lines; the Manhattan and Bronx Surface Transit Operating Authority replaced it in 1962.

On June 6, 1954, with the conversion of several streets to one-way streets, the route of the 10 was modified. Eighth Avenue was made one-way northbound between Abingdon Square and Columbus Circle, and Hudson Street was made one-way northbound between Chambers Street and Abingdon Square. Seventh Avenue was made one-way southbound between 47th Street and Houston Street, and Varick Street was made one-way southbound between Houston Street and Leonard Street. Southbound 10 service was rerouted along Broadway from Columbus Circle to Times Square, Seventh Avenue to West Broadway and West Broadway to Leonard Street. Initially, New York City Omnibus planned to reroute northbound Route 8 buses along Seventh Avenue to Hudson Street and Eighth Avenue for its entire route between 59th Street and Canal Street, and reroute a portion of southbound service from Times Square's east side to the west side starting at 47th Street on June 12, 1954. Instead, at the request of T. T. Wiley, the Traffic Commissioner, Route 8 was discontinued and combined with Route 10 on June 13. This change eliminated a u-turn at Central Park South and Seventh Avenue.

In 1962, when the Surface Company bought the route they put one bus service for the entire length. This was given the route number 10, which then became bus M10. In Fiscal Year 1963, the route was modified due to the conversion of some two-way streets to one-way streets. Service began running north along Hudson Street and south along Seventh Avenue. On January 16, 1966, the branch of the M10 to Cortlandt Street was cut back to Vesey Street in anticipation of the demapping of several streets for the construction of the World Trade Center. Service used a terminal loop of West Broadway, Vesey Street, Church Street and Reade Street, with the terminal being located at Park Place. Previously service had traveled south along West Broadway, west on Cortlandt Street, north on the West Side Highway, east on Dey Street, and north on Church Street.

On May 9, 1977, weekday limited-stop service began on the M10, operating northbound between 4 p.m. and 5:20 p.m., and southbound between 6:40 a.m. and 8:30 a.m..

The New York City Transit Authority proposed officially eliminating M10 Limited service along 145th Street and Lenox Avenue to Esplanade Gardens at 147th Street on December 30, 1986. Two southbound trips and three northbound trips had operated to this terminal, but due to passenger confusion and low ridership, this service was ended in late 1986 by the Surface Operations Department. The official change would reroute these trips to the usual northern terminal at 159th Street, and would take effect in March 1987.

On April 22, 1987, the New York City Transit Authority proposed several modifications to bus routes in Lower Manhattan to serve Battery Park City to the MTA Board, including the extension of the M10. Southbound service was extended south along West Broadway, west along Vesey Street, south along West Street, west on West Thames Street, and north on Sound End Avenue to the terminal at Liberty Street. Northbound service then ran north along South End Avenue, east along Liberty Street, north on West Street, east on Harrison Street and north via Hudson Street before returning to the existing route. This change eliminated service at four stops along Church Street and Reade Street, and service along Hudson Street between West Broadway and Harrison Street, affecting fewer than 100 riders, and removed a bottleneck at Reade Street. This change was implemented at the end of 1987.

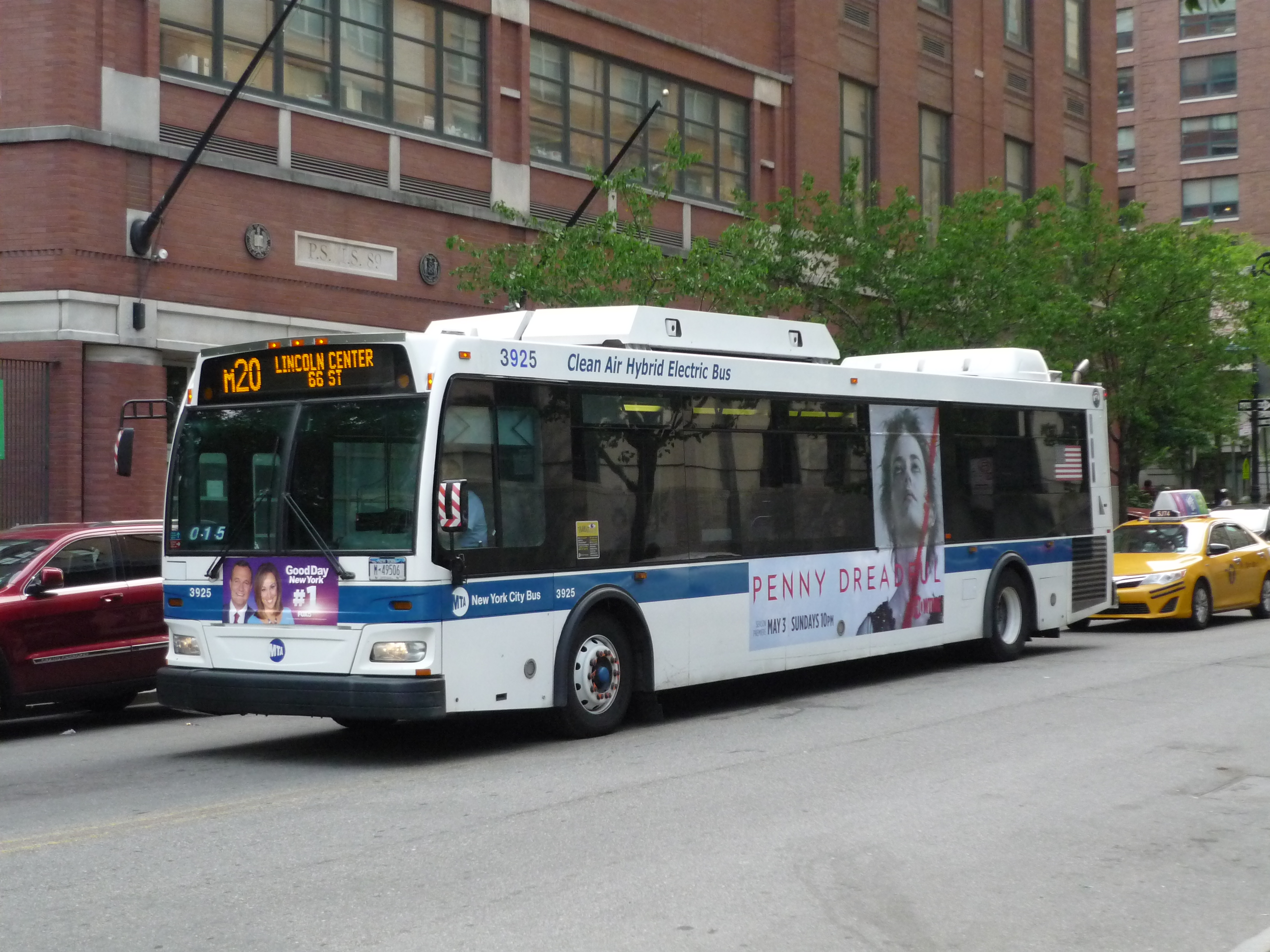
A 2008 Orion VII NG HEV (3925) on the Lincoln Center-bound M20 in Midtown Manhattan.

In January 1999, the MTA issued a performance report on the M10 route, calling the route "extremely long and unreliable", with long headways between buses. On January 16, 2000, the M10 was split into two routes, with the northern section from Harlem to Penn Station still operating under the M10 designation, and the southern segment from Columbus Circle to Battery Park City being renamed the M20. The two routes overlapped between Penn Station and Columbus Circle. Riders transferring between the M10 and the M20 were given an additional free transfer. Since the M10 no longer served Abingdon Square, westbound M14 service was increased during the afternoon.

After the September 11 attacks in 2001, M20 service was initially revised to terminate in the northern section of Battery Park City without entering the southern section of the neighborhood. 700 riders a day headed to the northern section of the neighborhood during this period. On May 6, 2002, the M20's previous route was restored. In December 2002, the MTA announced plans to reroute the M20 from West Street to serve the northern portion of Battery Park City. West Street was difficult to cross, and the M20 could not stop on West Street southbound due to high curbs. Northbound service would travel north via West Street, west via Murray Street, north of North End Avenue, and east on Chambers Street before heading back to its previous route, while southbound service would head west on Chambers Street, south on North End Avenue, east on Vesey Street, and south on West Street, before resuming its previous route. The change was estimated to cost $160,000 annually, and would take effect in January 2003.

Due to budget constraints during the Great Recession, M10 buses' southern terminus was truncated to Columbus Circle on June 27, 2010. On the same day, the M20 was extended to South Ferry, replacing the section of the M9 south of City Hall. The truncation, which saved $1.1 million annually, resulted in a significant drop in ridership on the M10, with riders instead using the M7, the M20, and the subway. M20 ridership increased with the truncation of M10 service and its extension to South Ferry. On April 3, 2011, however, M10 service was extended by two blocks to 57th Street, with the final southbound stop at 58th Street and Broadway and the first northbound stop at 57th Street and Eighth Avenue.
