= Wolf Point, Chicago =

Human settlement in Illinois, US

Coordinates: 41°53′10″N 87°38′17″W

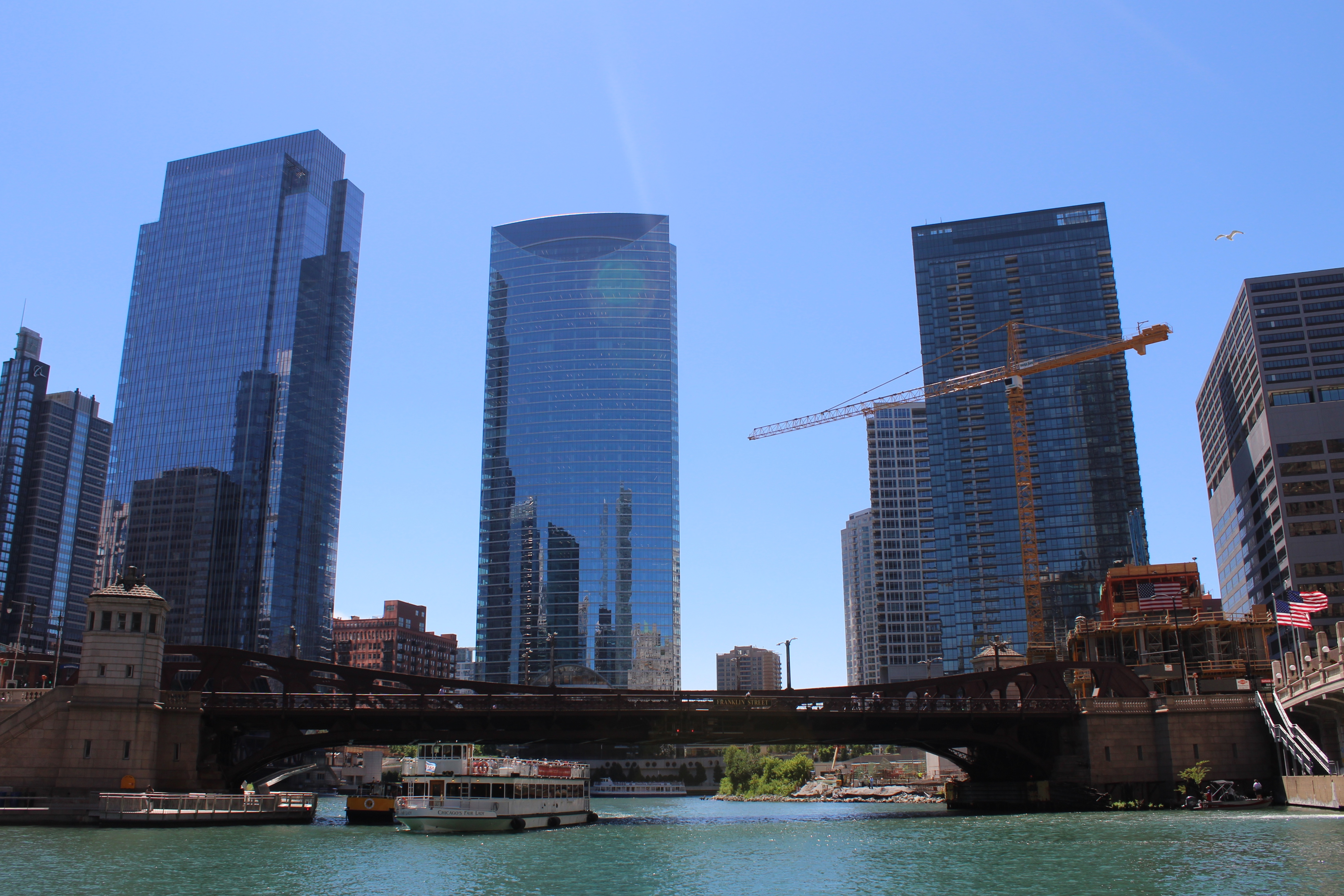
Wolf Point in July 2018

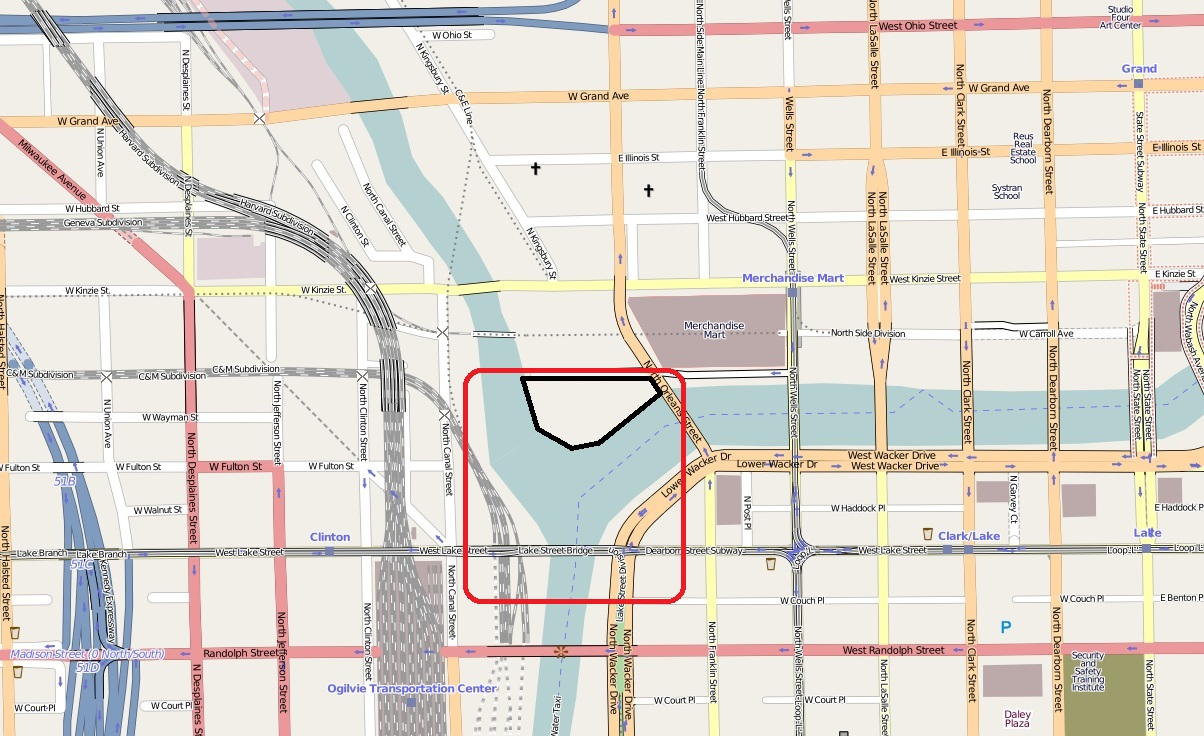
Map depicting Wolf Point (area owned by the Kennedy family in black, with approximate area of the historical Wolf Point settlement in red)

Wolf Point is the location at the confluence of the North, South and Main Branches of the Chicago River in the present day Near North Side, Loop, and Near West Side community areas of Chicago. This fork in the river is historically important in the development of early Chicago. Located about 1.6 miles (2.6 km) from Lake Michigan, this was the location of Chicago's first three taverns, its first hotel, Sauganash Hotel, its first ferry, its first drug store, its first church, its first theater company, and the first bridges across the Chicago River. The name is said to possibly derive from a Native American Chief whose name translated to wolf, but alternate theories exist.

Historically, the west bank of the river at the fork was called "Wolf Point," but in the 1820s and 1830s it came to denote the entire area and the settlement that grew up around the river-fork. Wolf Point is now often used more specifically to refer to a plot of land on the north side of the fork in the Near North Side community area partially owned by the Kennedy family, now occupied by Wolf Point South Tower. Today the north bank at the fork, is the location of several commercial skyscrapers and high-rises, the west bank includes condominium high rises, commercial skyscrapers, including River Point and 150 North Riverside on air rights over railroad tracks, while the south bank includes part of the Chicago Riverwalk and serves as the transition point of Wacker Drive from an east–west street to a north–south street, above which the 333 Wacker Drive building curves in line with the riverbend.

== Background ==
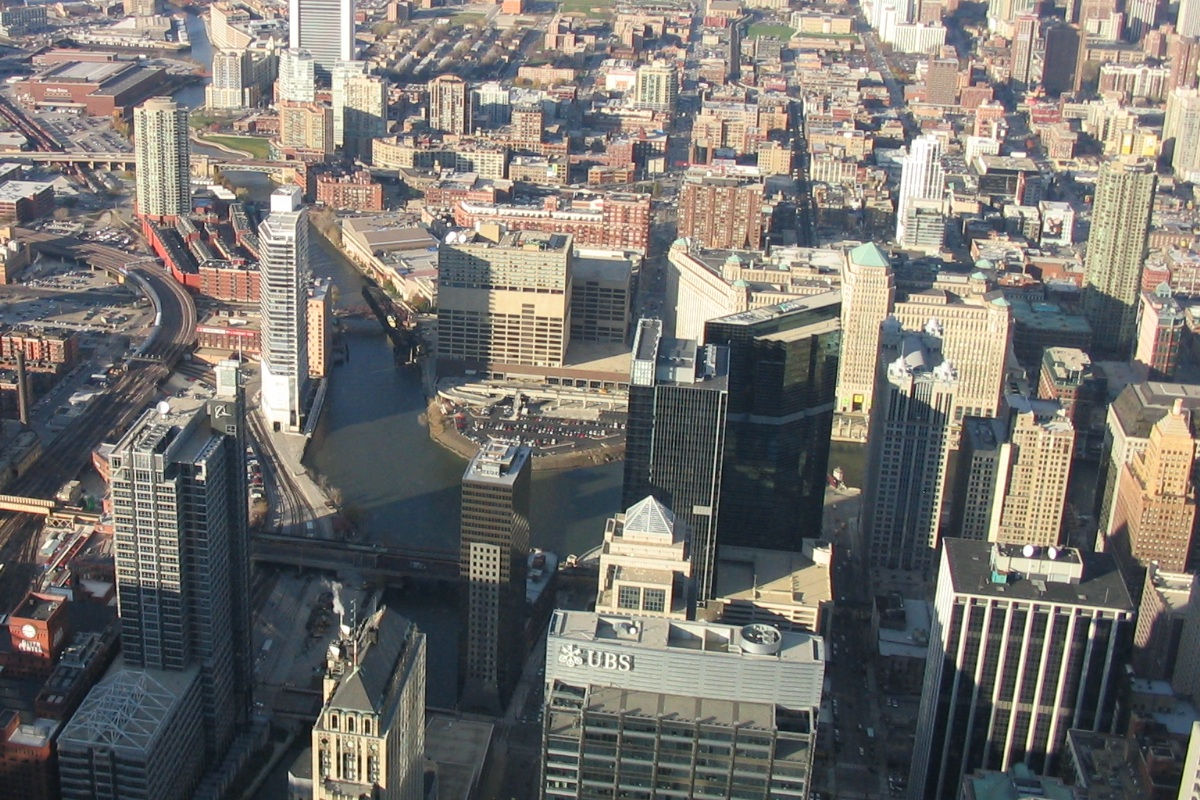
View of Wolf Point from the south in the Chicago Loop (2005)

The origin of the name, Wolf Point, is unknown. In her 1856 memoir Wau-Bun, Juliette Kinzie states that 'the place was then called Wolf Point, from its having been the residence of an Indian named "Moa-way," or "the Wolf."' Other alternate explanations are that it was so-named after the landlord of what would later be called the Wolf Point Tavern killed a ferocious wolf and hung a painted sign of a wolf outside his tavern to commemorate the event, or that it was named by a soldier at Fort Dearborn because it was a place where wolves would gather at night. Originally the term Wolf Point referred to the west bank of the Chicago River at the fork junction of its branches, but it gradually came to refer to the whole region around the forks and in modern usage is often more specifically used to mean the plot of land on the north side of the forks. The confluence of the three branches of the river near Wolf Point provided inspiration for Chicago's Municipal Device, a Y-shaped, city identification symbol that can be seen on many buildings in Chicago, and on city owned vehicles.

== Early settlement ==
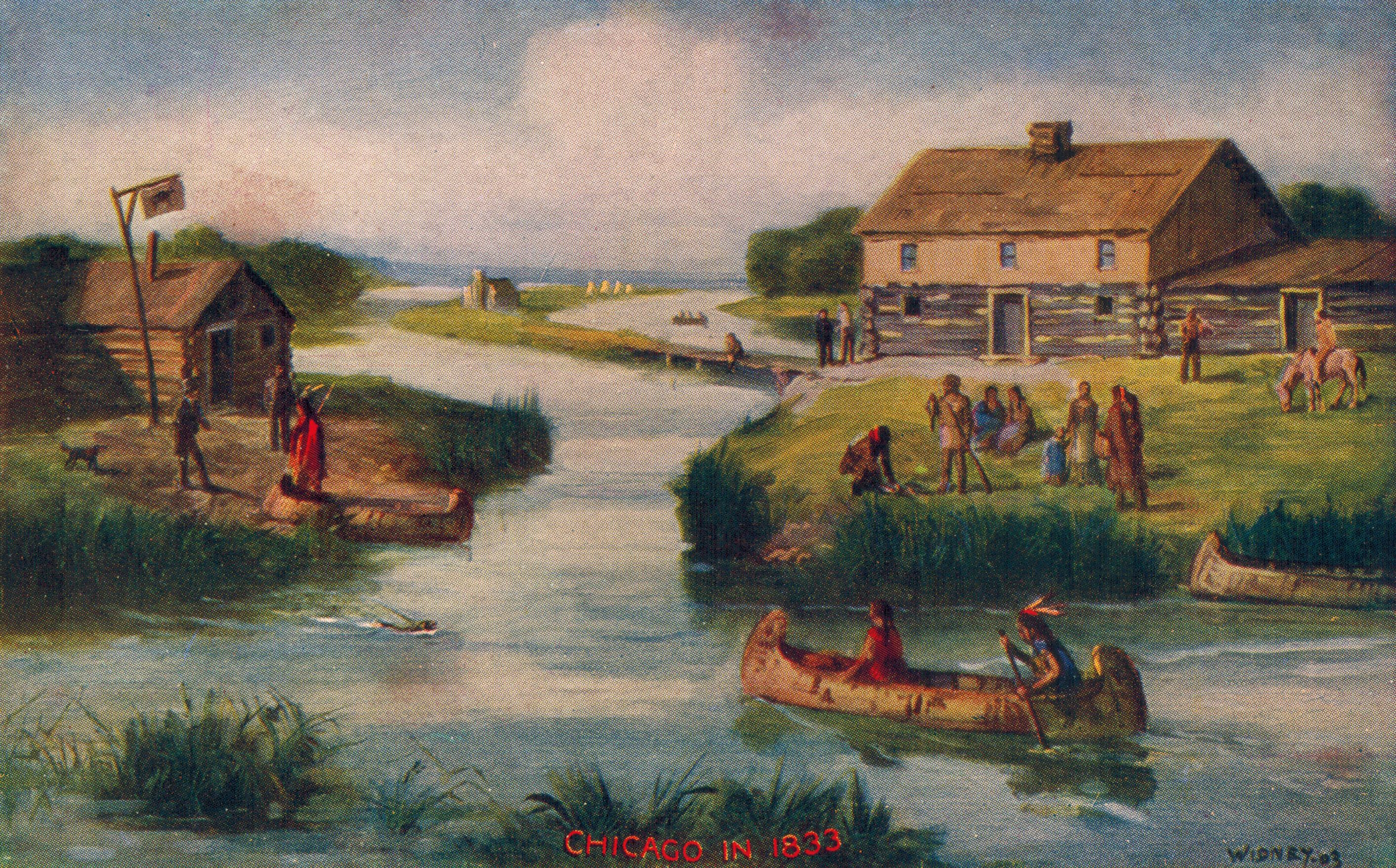
Wolf Point in 1833

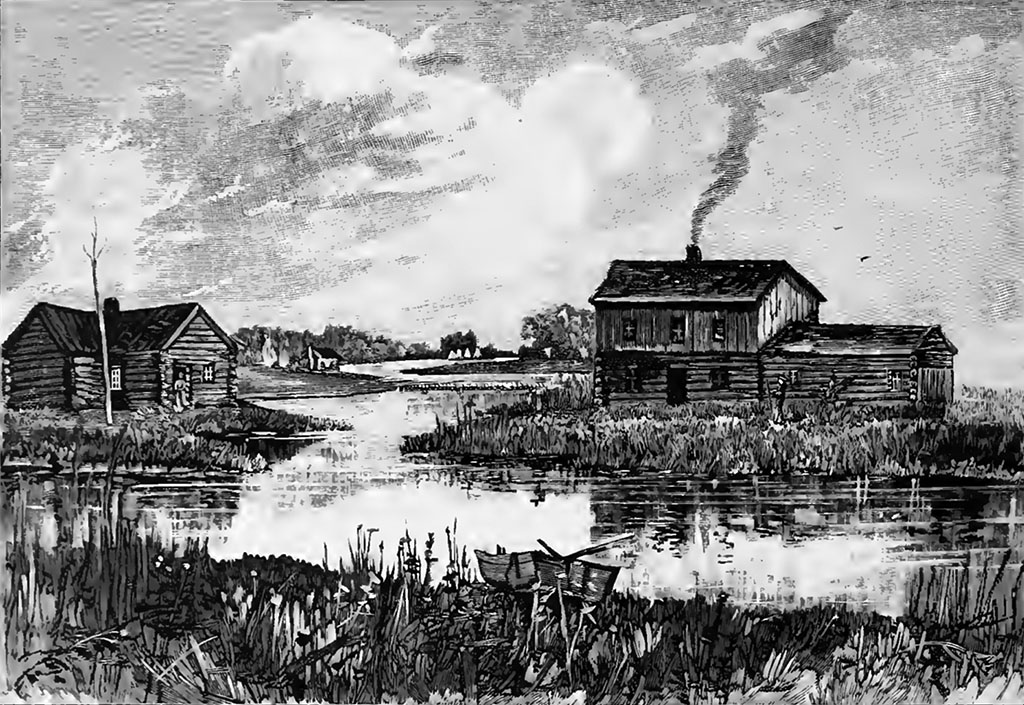
View of Wolf Point from the south as it might have appeared in 1830 (published in 1884); the Wolf Point Tavern is on the left, the Miller Tavern is on the right

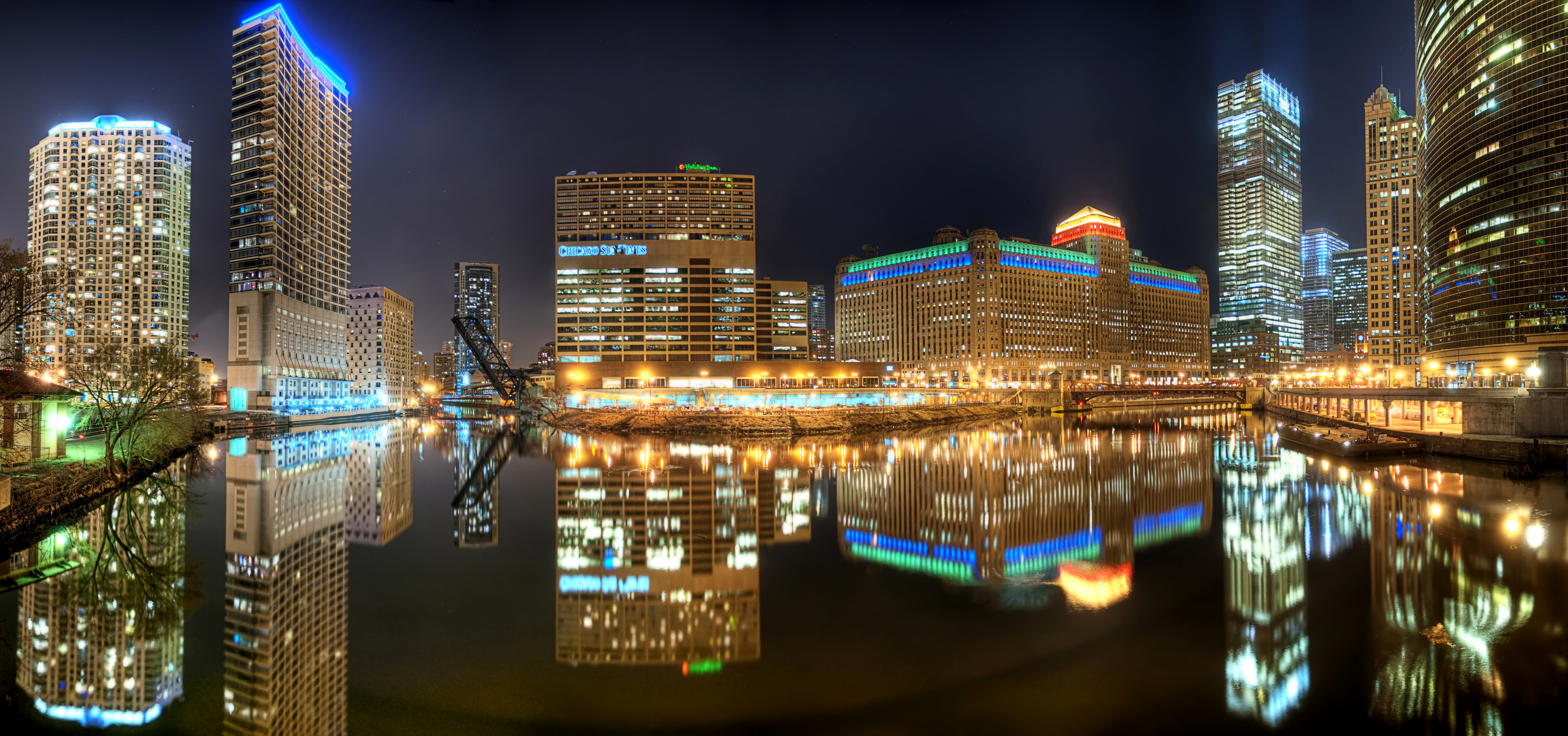
Wolf Point from a similar viewpoint in 2009; among the buildings and structures shown are (left to right) Left Bank at K Station (300 North Canal), 333 North Canal, Kinzie Street railroad bridge, 350 West Mart Center, Merchandise Mart, 300 North LaSalle, Franklin Street Bridge and part of 333 Wacker Drive

The first non-indigenous settler at Wolf Point may have been a trader named Guarie. Writing in 1880 Gurdon Hubbard, who first arrived in Chicago on October 1, 1818, stated that he had been told of Guarie by Antoine De Champs and Antoine Beson, who had been traversing the Chicago Portage annually since about 1778. Hubbard wrote that De Champs had shown him evidence of a trading house and the remains of a cornfield supposed to have belonged to Guarie. The cornfield was located on the west bank of the North Branch of the Chicago River, a short distance from the forks at what is now Fulton Street; early settlers named the North Branch of the Chicago River the Guarie River, or Gary's River.

James Kinzie, the son of early settler John Kinzie, built a tavern on the west bank of the river at Wolf Point in 1828. By 1829 this tavern was operated for Kinzie by Archibald Caldwell who was granted a liquor license on December 8 of that year. (Note: Some sources state that Archibald Caldwell was the first licensed liquor seller in Chicago; however licenses had previously been issued to Archibald Clybourn and Samuel Miller on May 2, 1829.) Caldwell left Chicago early in 1830 and Elijah Wentworth became the landlord of the tavern. He was in turn succeeded by Charles Taylor (1831–1833) and William Walters (1833–1836). The tavern became known as the 'Wolf Point Tavern' or 'Wolf Tavern' and a painted sign of a wolf was hung outside the tavern by approximately 1833.

In about 1829, Samuel Miller and his brother John opened a store on the north bank of the river at the forks. In 1830, they enlarged their store and began to operate it as a tavern in competition with the Wolf Point Tavern. On June 2, 1829 Samuel Miller and Archibald Clybourn had been authorized to operate the first ferry across the Chicago River. Clybourn was the ferry man, crossing the North Branch of the river between Miller's tavern and the Wolf Point Tavern. In 1831 John Miller built a log house near his brother's tavern that he used as a tannery; Chicago's first recorded factory. Samuel Miller sold the tavern and moved away following the death of his wife in 1832.

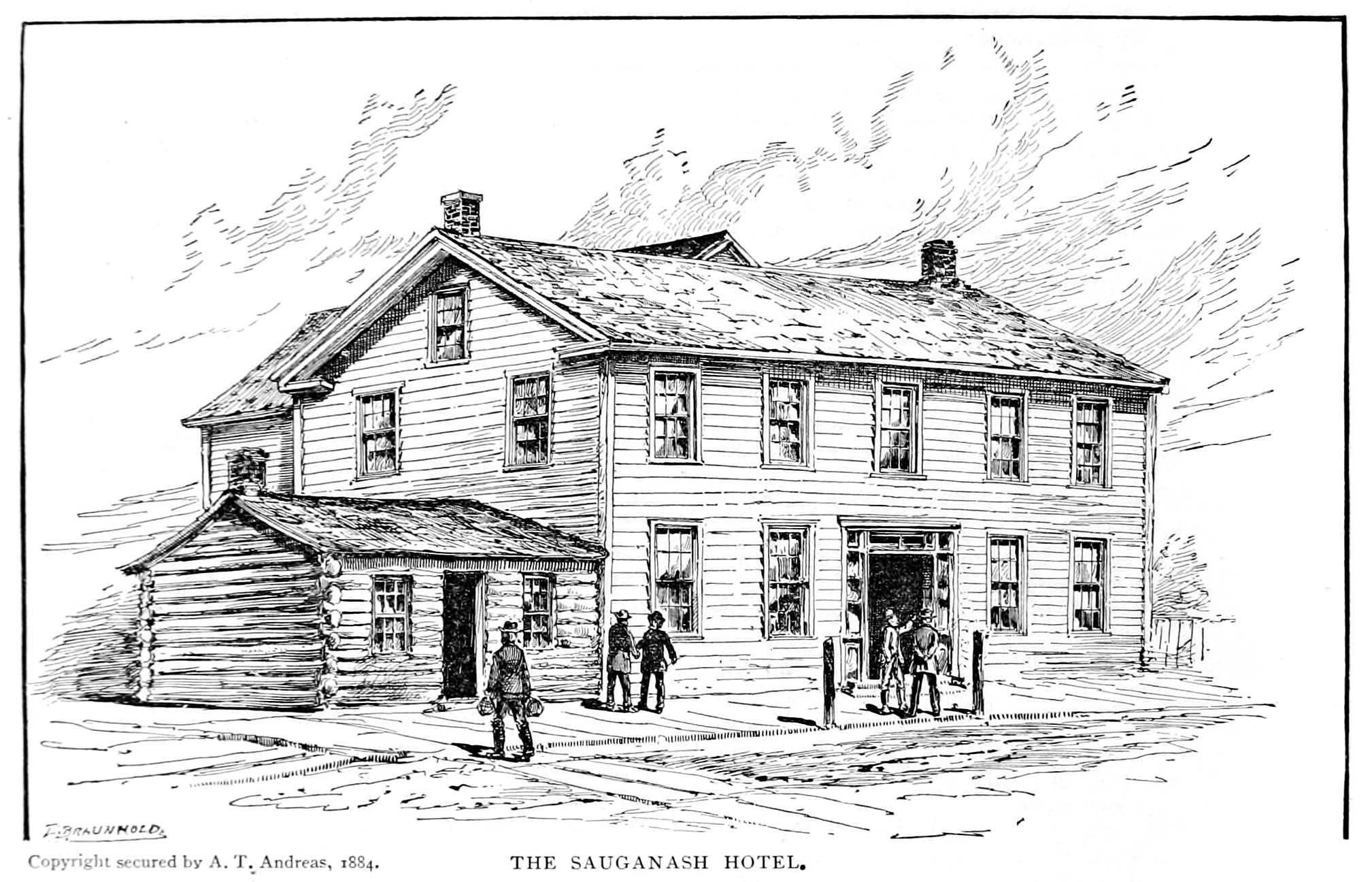
The Sauganash Hotel was Chicago's first hotel.

Mark Beaubien opened the Eagle Exchange Tavern in a log cabin on the south bank in 1829. In 1831 Beaubien added a frame addition and opened the Sauganash Hotel, Chicago's first hotel. Immediately adjacent to the hotel's public bar was Chicago's first drug store. Beaubien left the Sauganash Hotel in 1834, but the hotel continued in operation until it was destroyed by a fire in 1851. In 1837, the hotel hosted the first Chicago theatre company in a converted dining room. The site of the Sauganash Hotel was redeveloped as the Wigwam in 1860; the site today is at 191 North Wacker and is designated as a Chicago Landmark.

James Kinzie built the Green Tree Tavern at the northeastern corner of Canal and Lake Streets in 1833. The tavern went through a succession of owners and name changes before being moved in 1880 to 33, 35, and 37 Milwaukee Avenue. In 1902 plans were made to preserve the building and move it to Garfield Park, however the hotel collapsed before work could start on this project.

Rev. Jesse Walker started the first church on June 14, 1831, with ten members in a log cabin. In 1838, the congregation floated their log cabin across the Chicago River and rolled it on logs to the corner of Washington and Clark Streets, where it is now the First United Methodist Church Chicago Temple.

Archibald Clybourn's ferry across the North Branch of the river was replaced by a bridge in the winter of 1831 and 1832, and a bridge across the South Branch of the river located between Lake and Randolph Streets was added in the winter of 1832 and 1833. Early settlers J. D. Caton, John Bates, Charles Cleaver, and John Noble wrote in a letter in the fall of 1883 that both of these bridges were constructed of logs; they were about 10 feet (3.0 m) wide, and cleared the river by about 6 feet (1.8 m).

== Development ==
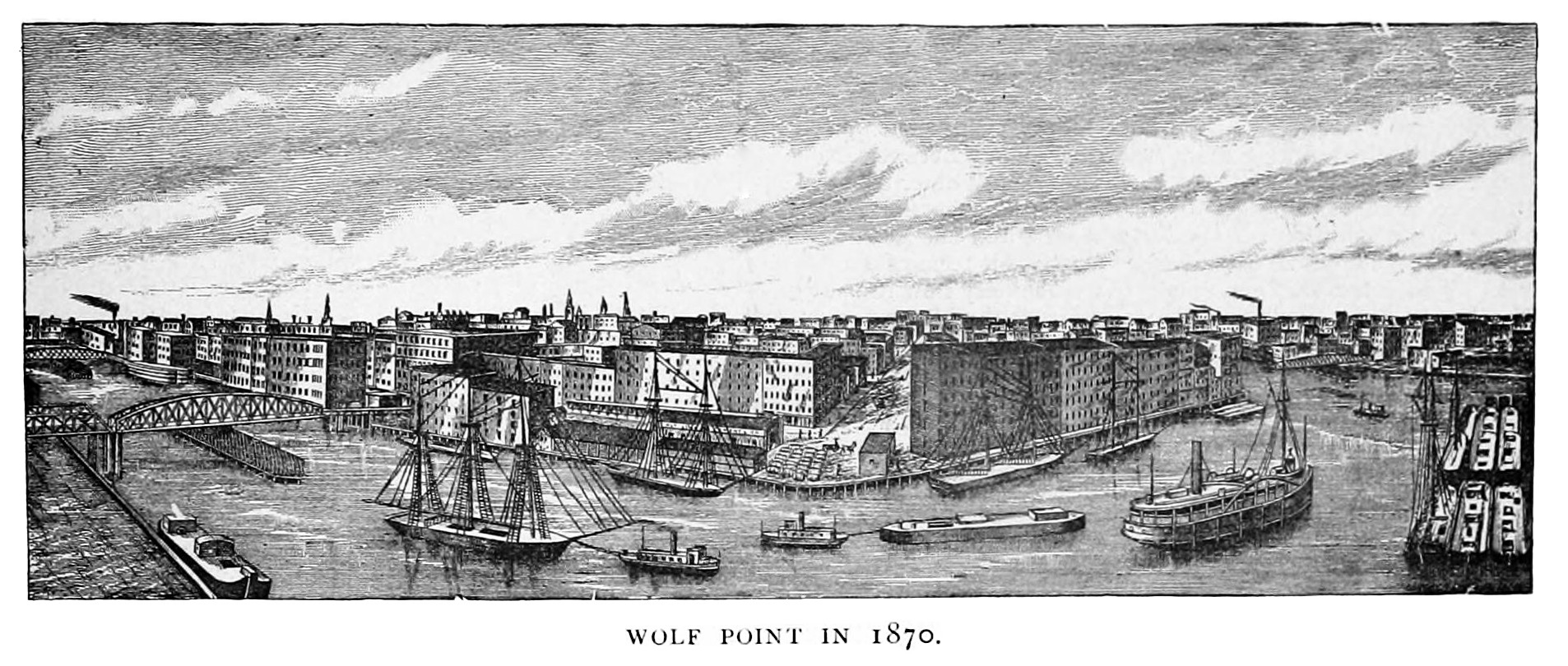
Wolf Point in 1870

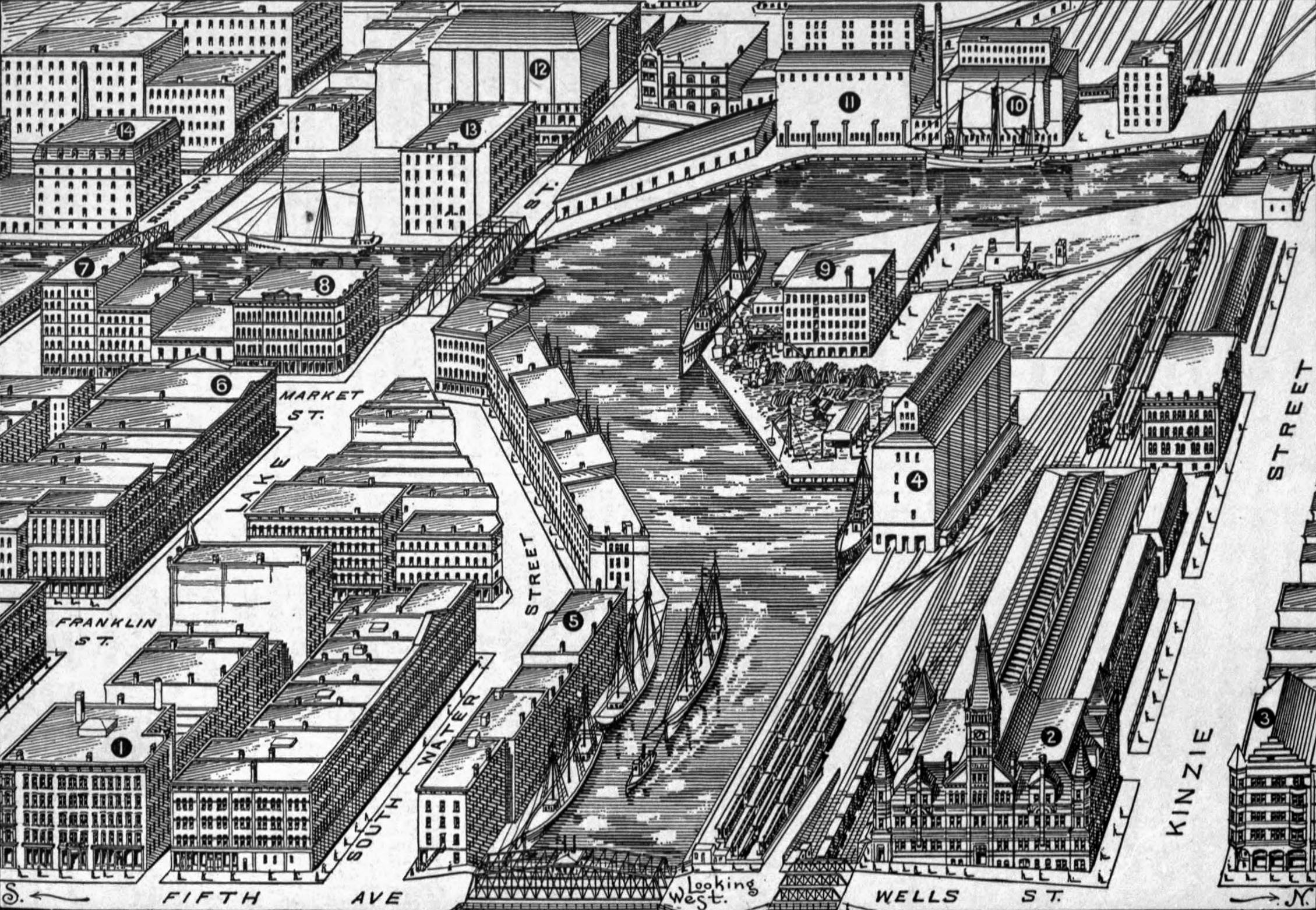
Bird's-eye view of Wolf Point viewed from the east as it appeared in 1893

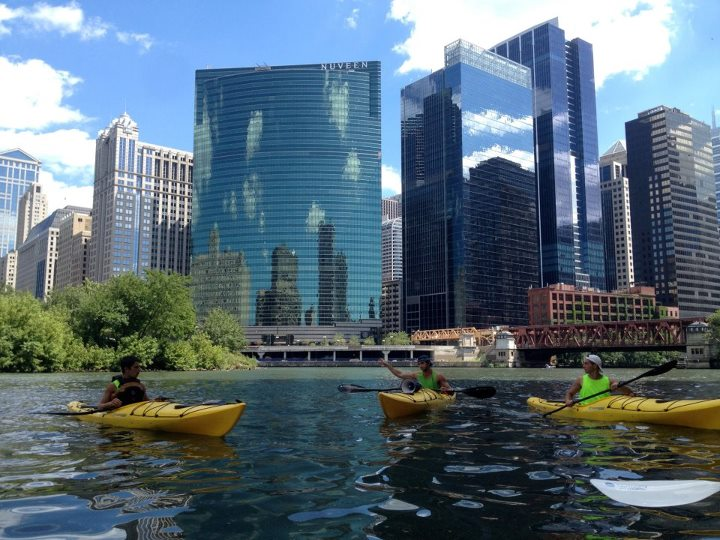
Wolf Point looking south 2012

When the Illinois and Michigan Canal opened in 1848, the landmass at Wolf Point was decreased by dredging to accommodate a turning basin for ships. In the autumn of the same year the Galena and Chicago Union Railroad opened Chicago's first railroad depot at Wolf Point, on the southwestern corner of Kinzie and Canal Streets. By 1857 the site of Wolf Point Tavern was being used as a lumber yard; the Fulton Elevator, one of Chicago's earliest grain elevators, was built just to the north of the former tavern in 1852. Several blocks to the west of Wolf Point were destroyed in a large fire on September 15, 1859. The Fulton Elevator survived this, and the Great Chicago Fire of 1871, but was burned down on September 7, 1873. It was rebuilt in the same year, and another grain elevator, the St Paul Elevator, was added immediately to the south of the original in 1879. The Chicago, Milwaukee and St. Paul railway company purchased both elevators in 1889 for $400,000, (Note: equivalent to $14,333,333 in 2025) but demolished them in 1906. Currently, the site is occupied by the Riverbend Condominiums at 333 North Canal Street.

The property on the north bank of the river at Wolf Point was owned by businessman Marshall Field until it was sold to Democratic Party figure and Kennedy family patriarch Joseph P. Kennedy in 1945 or 1946, depending on the source. Although the Kennedy family sold much of the complex center property to Vornado Realty Trust in 1998 as part of a larger $625 million transaction, (Note: equivalent to $1.23 billion in 2025) the family retained their interest in the 4 acres (16,000 m^{2}) of Wolf Point land. The area still owned by the Kennedy family is bounded by the Chicago River to the east, west, south and 350 West Mart Center to the north. The Merchandise Mart is located diagonally to the northeast. There have been numerous plans to develop the property dating back to the late 1980s. In 2007, the Kennedys planned to develop the property with three high-rises and skyscrapers to designs by Argentine-American architect César Pelli. In 2012, updated plans were proposed with several target completion dates over the next decade. The property is a coveted real estate location that has had several serious redevelopment plans in the past. In 2014, construction began on the first phase of the planned Wolf Point Towers. A joint venture including the AFL-CIO Building Investment Trust and the Kennedy Family completed the 46-story Wolf Point West tower with union construction labor in 2016. A building permit for construction of Wolf Point East was issued on June 22, 2017 as a 60-story, 698-unit, 660-foot (201.17 m) building and by June 28, a joint venture of the AFL-CIO Building Investment Trust, the Kennedy Family, and Hines began construction on the $380 million project (Note: equivalent to $499 million in 2025) with a $200 million loan (Note: equivalent to $263 million in 2025) through a lending group that included Bank of America, Citizens Bank, ING Real Estate Finance, and Ullico. Occupancy is expected in 2019.

The south bank was redeveloped as part of Mayor Rahm Emanuel's plans to extend the Chicago Riverwalk, which is located on the south bank of the Chicago River. Initially, this portion of the Riverwalk was to be standard sheet pile. However, Civil Engineering firm, Epstein, was concerned about the flood plain, and suggested a cantilevered walkway. Building it in this way would not have an impact on the flood plain. The design also allowed preservation of the vegetation growing on the banks, one of the few left on downtown Chicago river front properties,

== See also ==
- Apparel Center
- Fulton House, Chicago

== Notes ==
=== Bibliography ===
- Andreas, Alfred Theodore (1884). History of Chicago. From the earliest period to the present time (volume 1). Chicago, A. T. Andreas.
- Blanchard, Rufus (1881). Discovery and Conquests of the North-west, with the History of Chicago. R. Blanchard & Co.
- Currey, Josiah Seymour (1912). Chicago: its history and its builders, a century of marvelous growth (volume 1). The S.J. Clarke Publishing Company.
- Hill, Libby (2000). The Chicago River: a natural and unnatural history. Lake Claremont Press. ISBN 978-1-893121-02-7.
- Hurlbut, Henry Higgins (1881). Chicago Antiquities: comprising original items and relations, letters, extracts, and notes, pertaining to early Chicago. Chicago, For the author.
- Kinzie, Juliette (1856). Wau-Bun, the "Early Day" in the North-West. Derby and Jackson.
- Quaife, Milo Milton (1913). Chicago and the Old Northwest, 1673-1835. The University of Chicago Press.
- Solzman, David M (2006). The Chicago River: An Illustrated History and Guide to the River and Its Waterways. University Of Chicago Press. ISBN 0-226-76801-5.
