= Fulton House (Chicago) =

Condominium building in Chicago, Illinois

Coordinates: 41°53′17.6″N 87°38′22.6″W

Fulton House is a former cold storage warehouse converted into a residential building at Wolf Point, Chicago.

Fulton House was built in 1898 by Frank B. Abbott as a 15-story warehouse structure. In 1908, the building was converted to a cold storage warehouse with an addition of a section to the north and a 16th floor. The split of the original south section and newer north section can be seen from the outside by a large crack on the exterior wall as well as a few details on the facade.

The building's fame came from the conversion as a residential building by Harry Weese from 1979 to 1981. The 16 story building now contains 106 residential condo/lofts located at 345 North Canal Street. Once in a run down neighborhood, the area is now under renewal and revival.

== Gallery ==
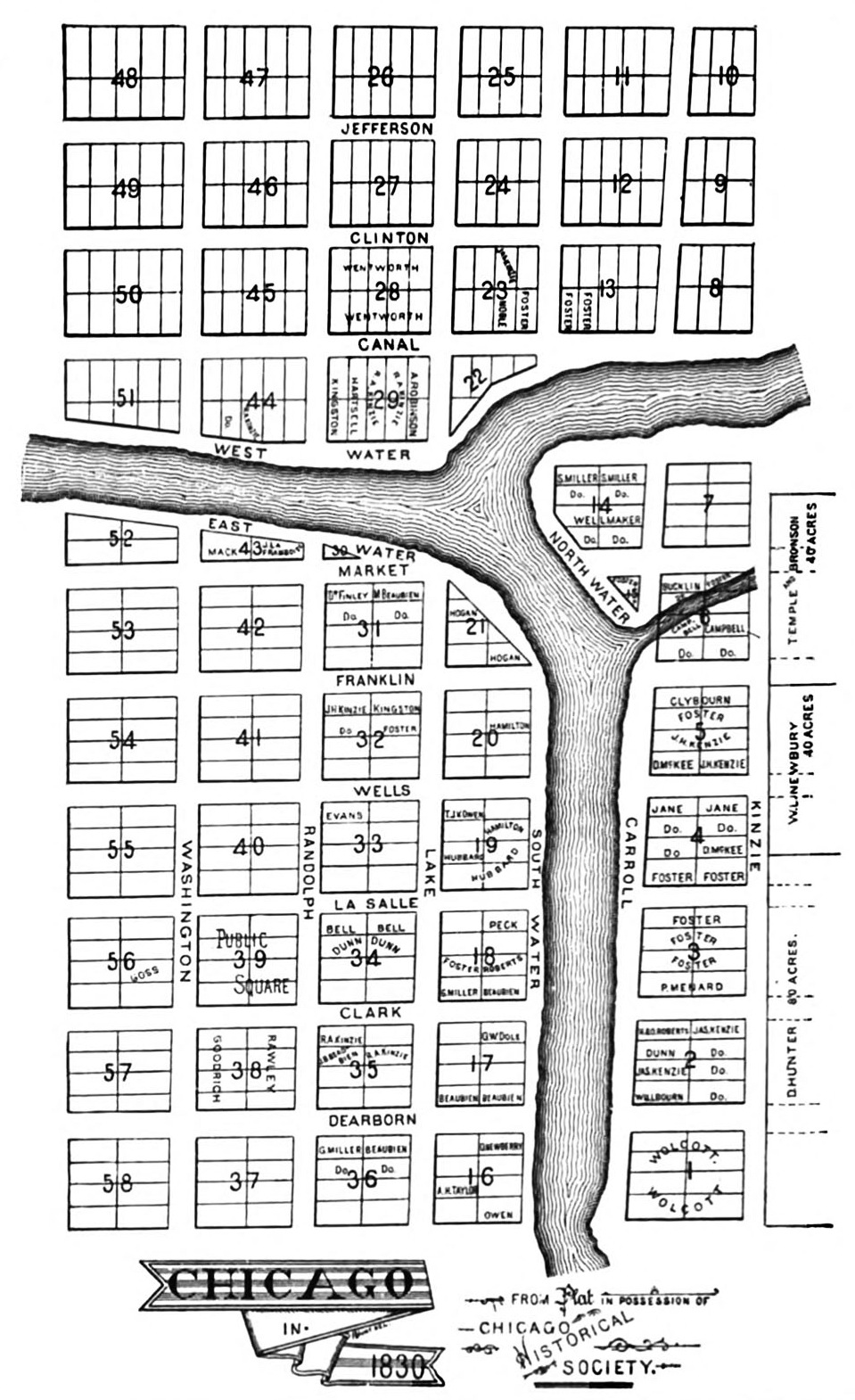
Fulton House is located just south of Block 8 along the Chicago River

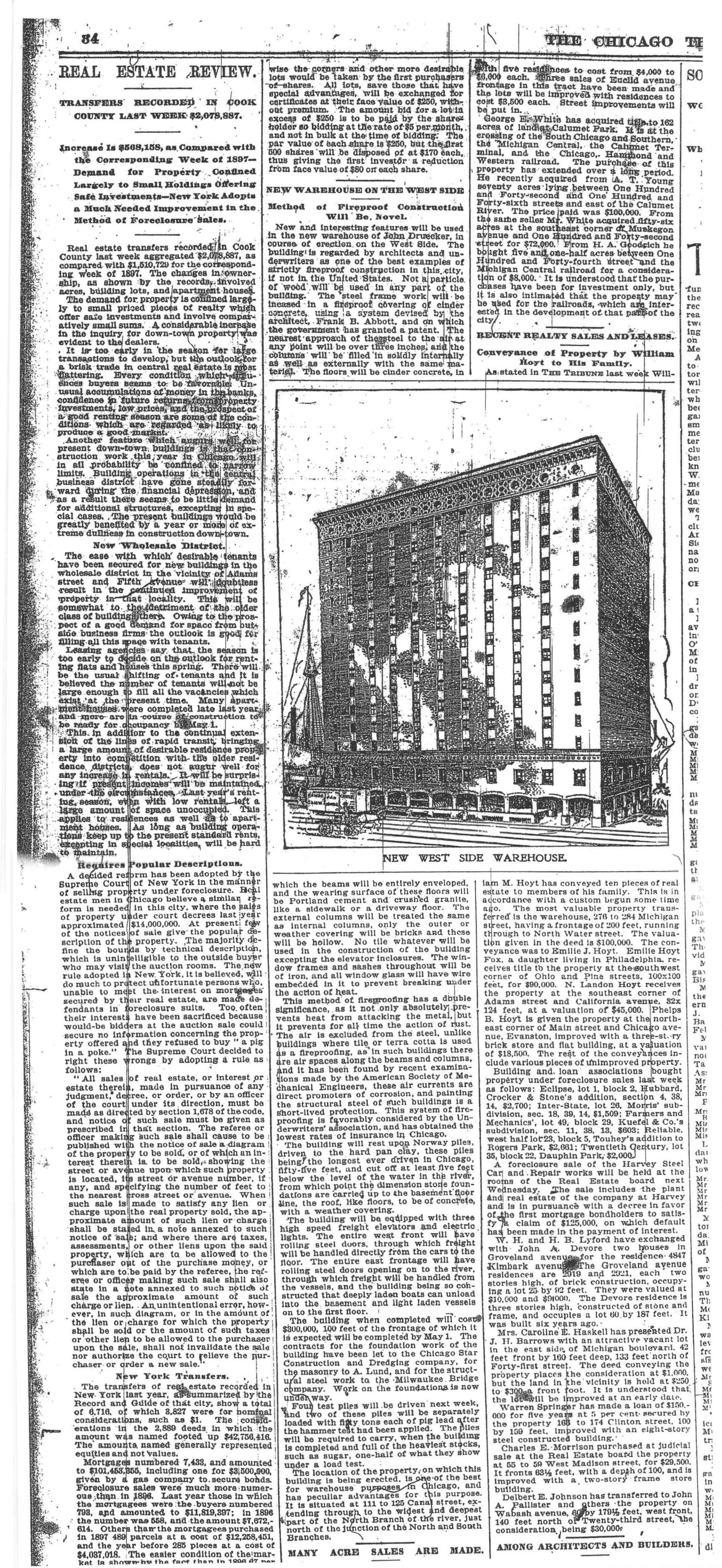
An article from 1898 showing plans for an upcoming warehouse, which would eventually become Fulton House.

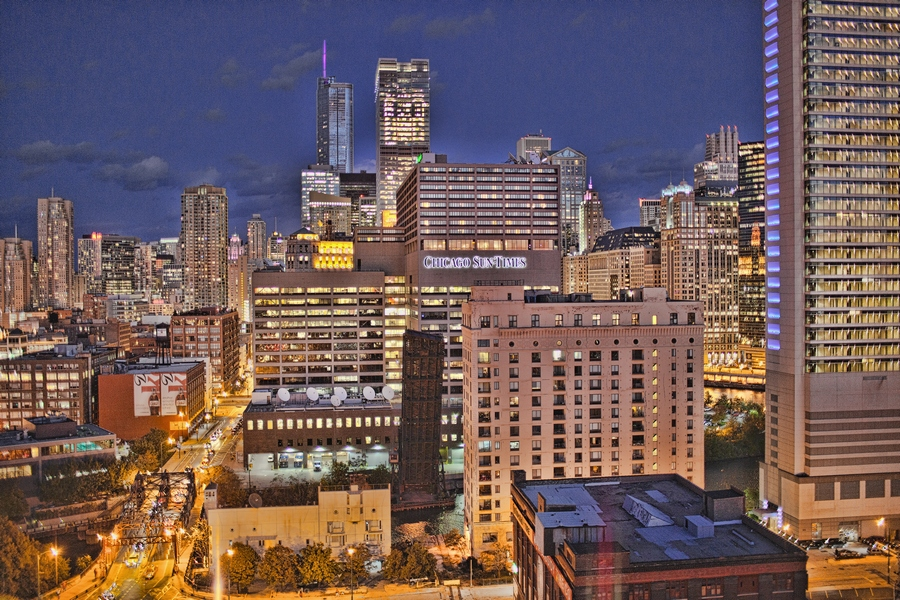
Fulton House, as seen looking east from Alta at K Station.

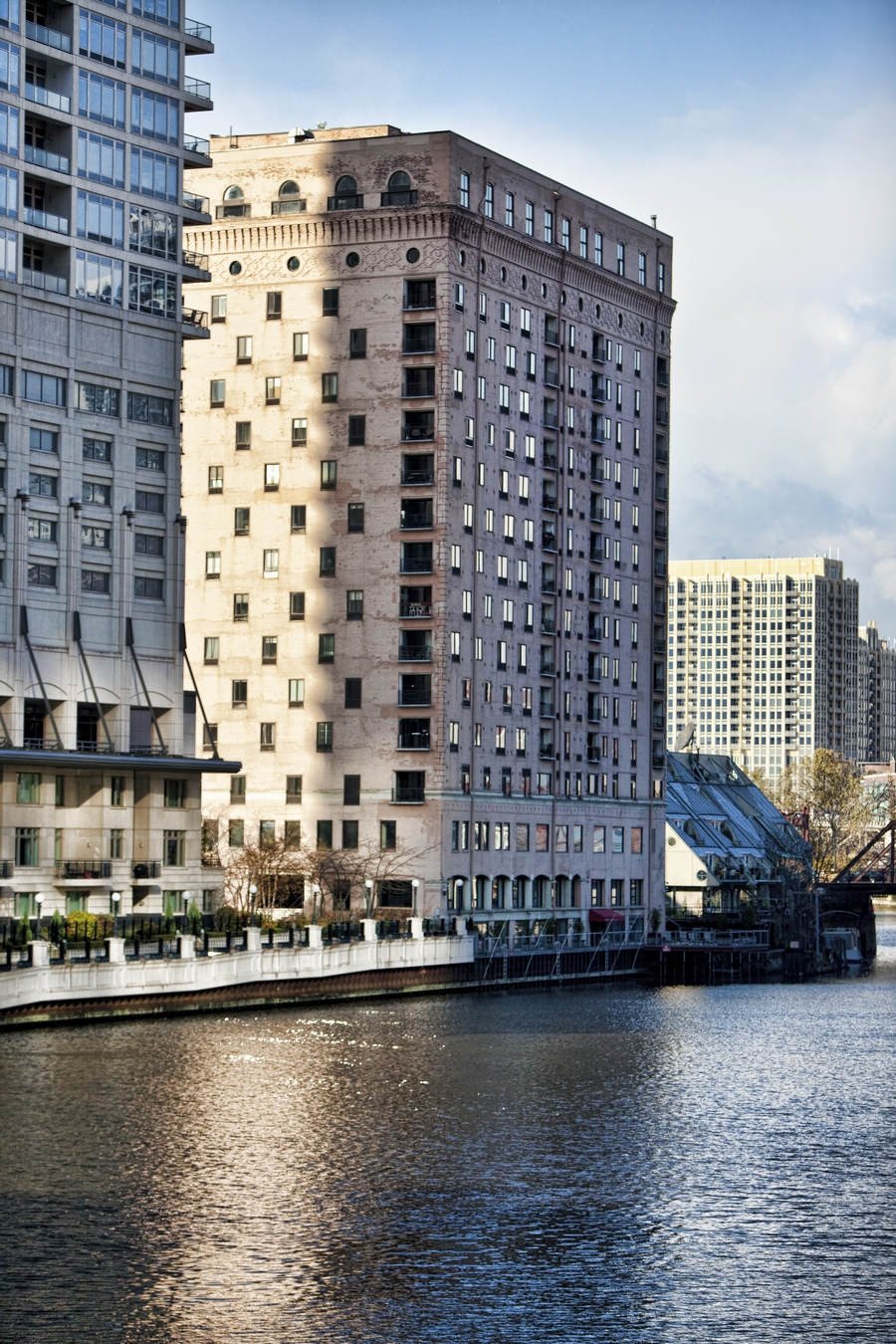
Fulton House sits at a juncture in the Chicago River known as Wolf Point.

== See also ==
Fulton House's more famous neighbors:

- Merchandise Mart
- Apparel Center

Fulton House is one of a few successful building conversions in North America. Queen's Quay Terminal is a former cold storage facility converted as a successful and popular commercial and residential complex along Toronto's waterfront.
