= Salesforce Tower Chicago =

Skyscraper in Illinois, US

Coordinates: 41°53′14.5″N 87°38′15.4″W

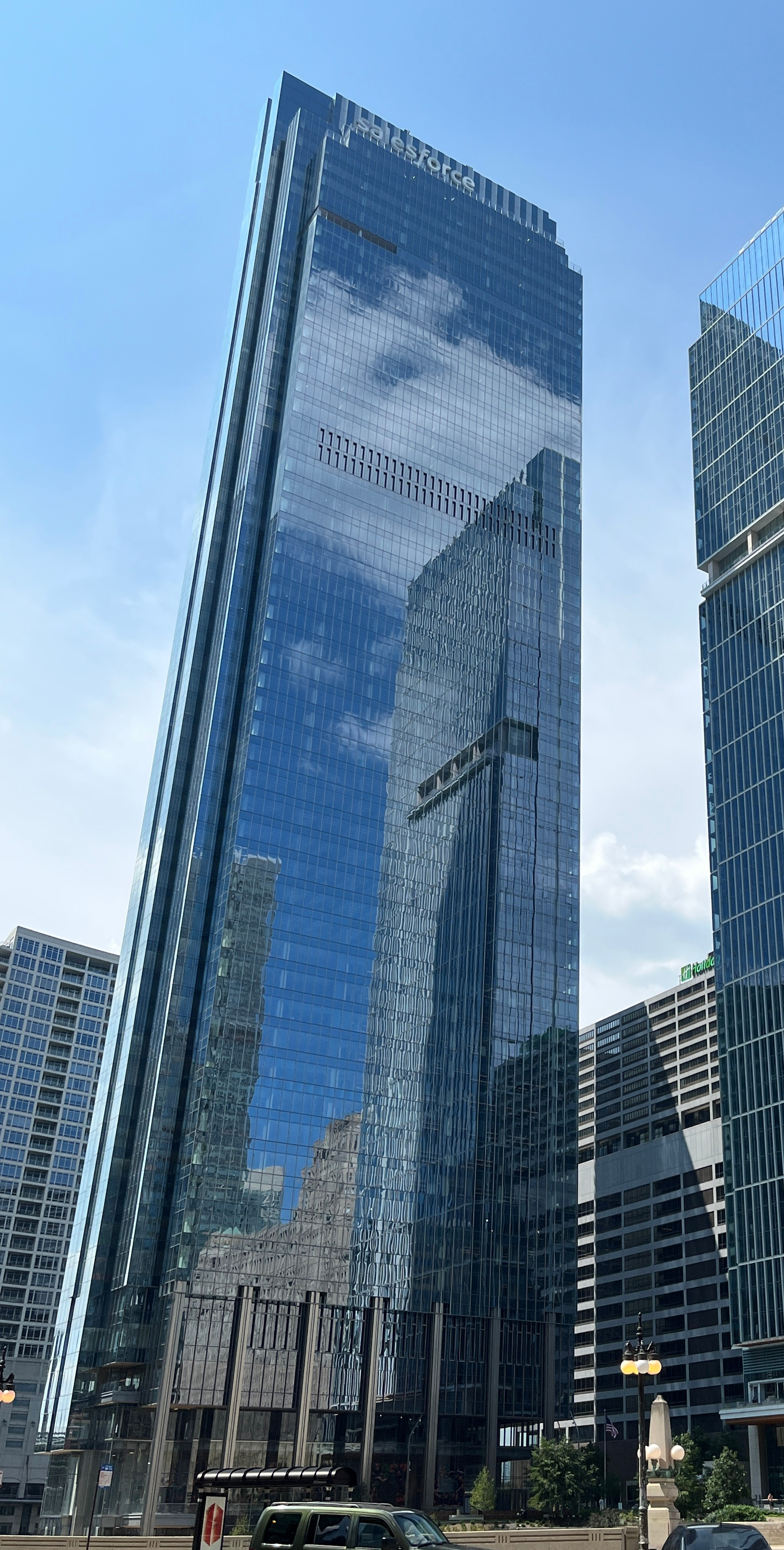
- Interactive map of the Salesforce Tower Chicago area

General information
- Location: Chicago, Illinois, United States, 333 West Wolf Point Plaza
- Construction started: 2020
- Completed: 2023

Height
- Height: 835 ft (255 m)

Technical details
- Floor count: 60

Design and construction
- Architect: Pelli Clarke Pelli Architects
- Developer: Gerald D Hines Interests

Website
- http://www.wolfpointchicago.com/

Salesforce Tower Chicago (initially named Wolf Point South Tower during construction) is a skyscraper at Wolf Point in downtown Chicago, Illinois. It is the tallest and last built of a three tower megadevelopment partly owned by the Kennedy family. The 835 ft (255 m)-tall tower was designed by Pelli Clarke and was completed in 2023. It is the regional headquarters of software company Salesforce.

== Background ==
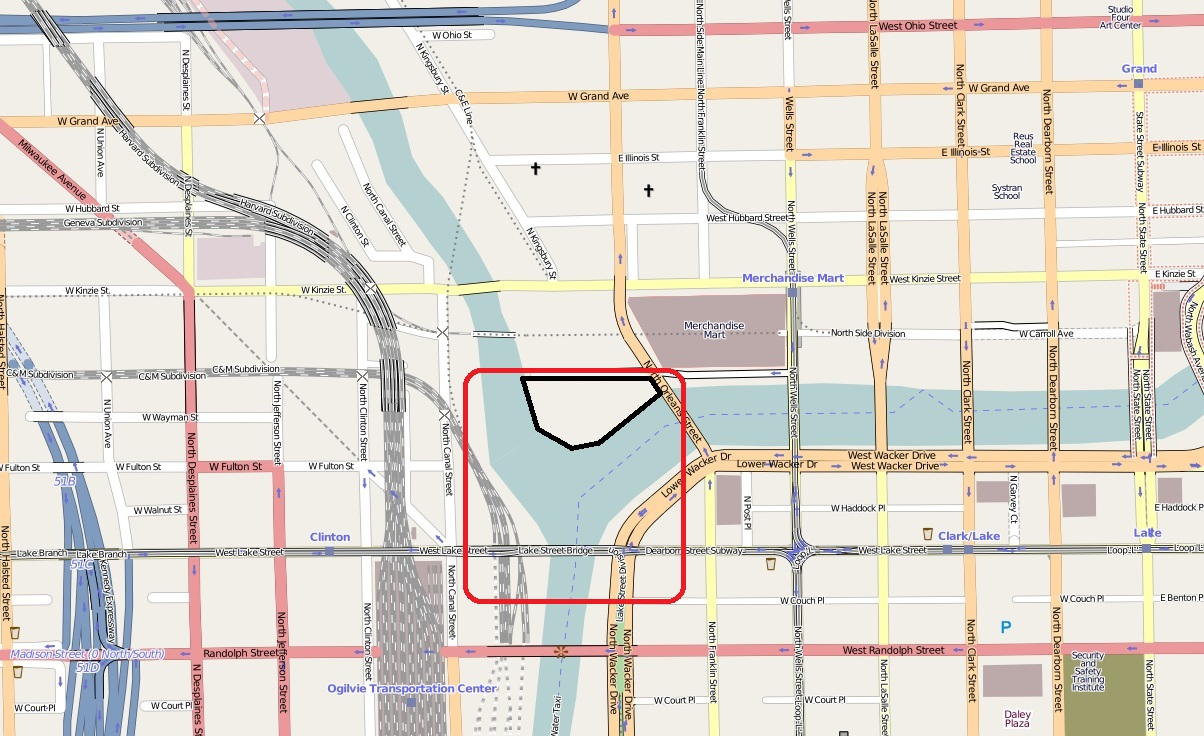
Map depicting Wolf Point (area owned by the Kennedy family in black, with approximate area of the historical Wolf Point settlement in red)

On January 26, 2012, the Chicago Sun-Times broke the story that the Kennedy family was planning a three-tower development at Wolf Point. On May 8, 2012, Chicago Alderman Brendan Reilly announced that a three-tower proposal for Wolf Point had been made including buildings of approximately 900 feet (274.32 m), 750 feet (228.60 m) and 525 feet (160.02 m) and that plans would be made public on May 29. The South Tower would be the tallest of these buildings.

== Location ==
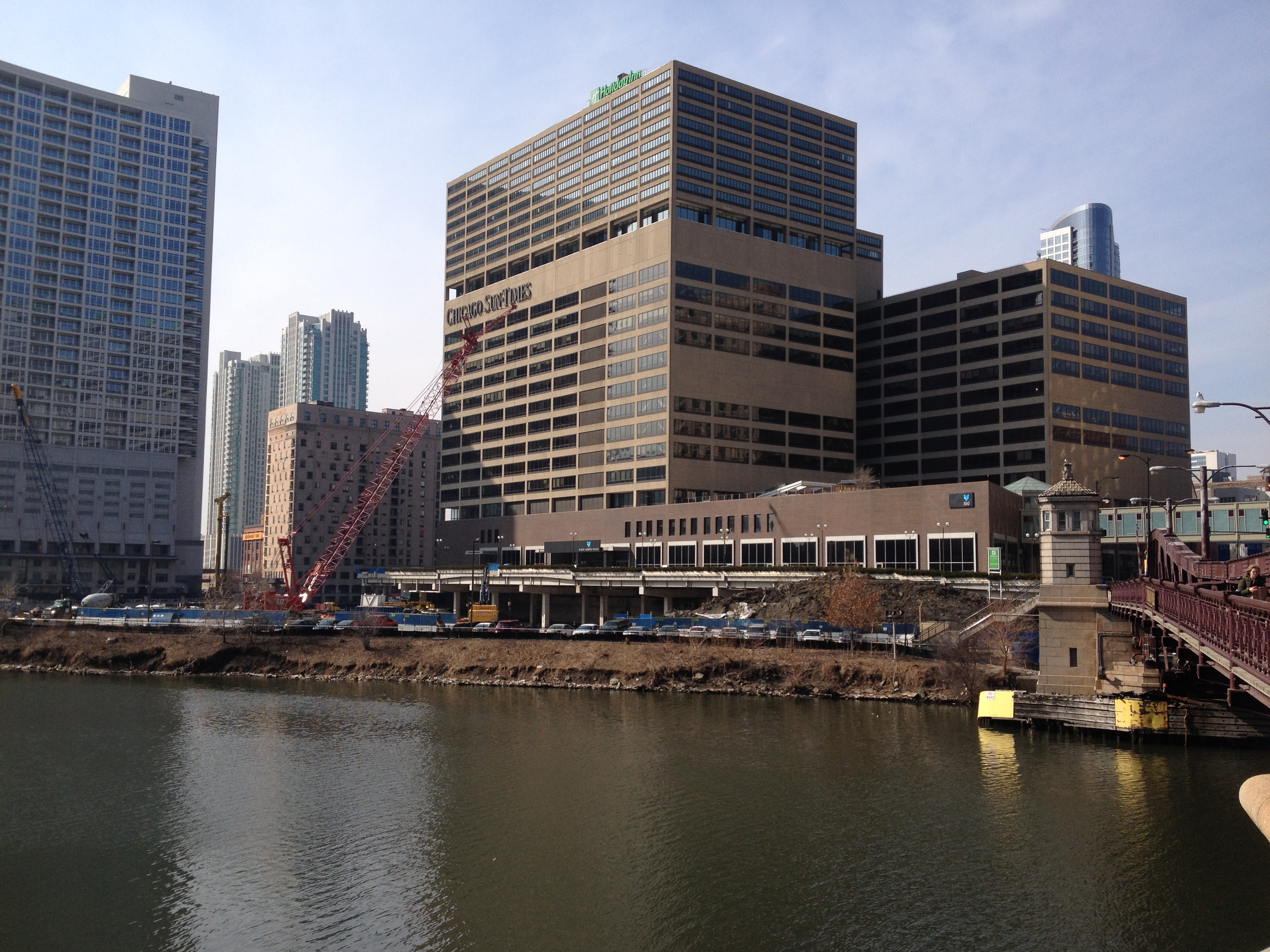
The site of Wolf Point South Tower in March 2014

The property upon which the development was planned is historic and drew scrutiny by critics. Plans for the tower development were presented as scheduled by the Kennedy family on land that they own in the River North neighborhood at the confluence of South, North, and Main Branches of the Chicago River southwest of the Merchandise Mart complex. As plans for the Kennedy proposal were developing on the north bank of Wolf Point, a plan for a 45- to 50-story office building on the west bank called River Point were progressing according to Robert Sharoff of The New York Times. Chicago Tribune Pulitzer Prize-winning architecture critic Blair Kamin felt that the initial plans presented by Christopher G. Kennedy needed some work.

== History ==
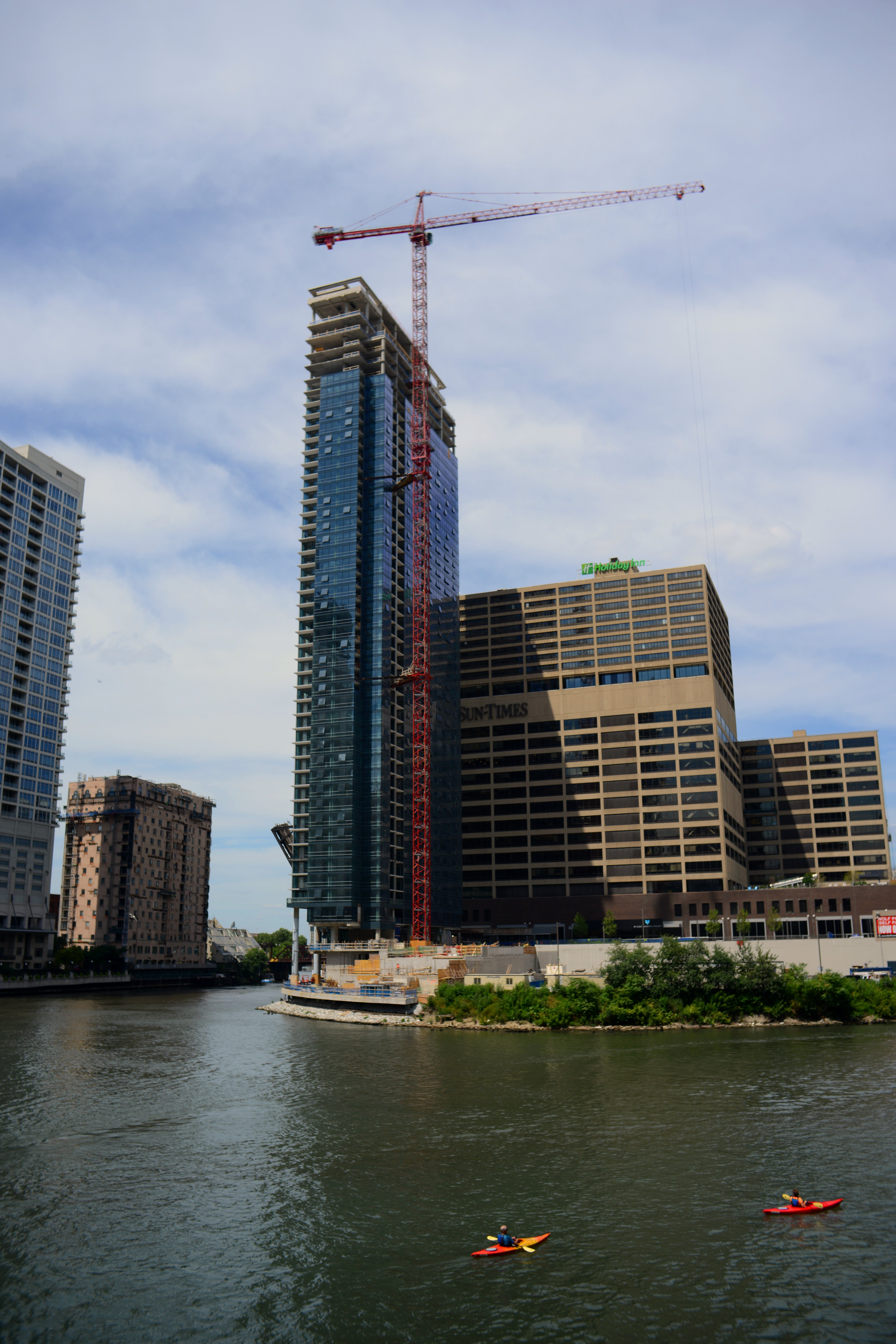
West Tower under construction in 2015

On October 30, 2012, a revised plan was presented that included more open space. In November the responses to the revisions were negative, and Reilly withdrew the proposal on November 27. The Chicago Plan Commission approved the plans for the entire three-tower development that included 1,410 residential units, 450 hotel rooms and 1,285 parking stalls on January 24, 2013.

In May 2013, opponents of the planned development filed suit in United States Federal Court. On November 19, 2013, U.S. District Judge Amy J. St. Eve ruled that the valuable and iconic views of downtown are not something that can be constitutionally protected saying "Illinois courts do not recognize property values, air, or light as constitutionally protected property interests." The Wolf Point Towers broke ground in March 2014. Neighboring Wolf Point West Tower had its groundbreaking ceremony on July 18, 2014. The building opened for residence on January 13, 2016.

In July 2015, a rumor emerged that the South Tower might exceed 1,000 feet (304.80 m) based on revised renderings. However, October 2016 plans showed the building had been scaled back to 950 feet (289.56 m). On November 30, 2018, Salesforce committed to a 17-year $475 million 500,000-square-foot (46,452 m^{2}) lease in the tower commencing in 2023. The lease included naming rights for the redesigned building to be named Salesforce Tower Chicago with a reduced height of 835 feet (255 m).

On April 2, 2020, despite the COVID-19 pandemic and the related economic slowdown that jeopardized construction projects around the world, the project secured a $500 million-plus construction loan and construction commenced within 2 days. Construction topped off in May 2022, and the building was completed in 2023.

== See also ==
- List of tallest buildings in Chicago
- List of tallest buildings in the United States
