= Wells Street Station =

Demolished train station in Chicago, Illinois

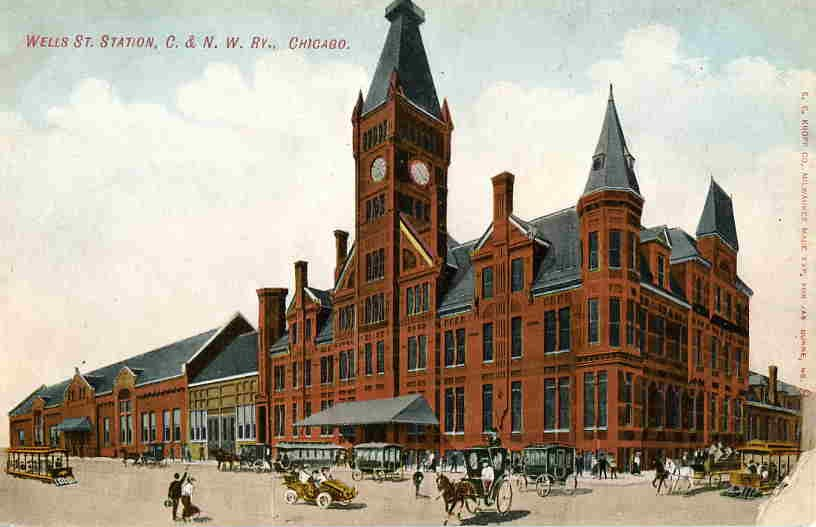
- Postcard view ca. 1910

General information
- Location: Wells Street, Chicago, Illinois
- Coordinates: 41.88858°N 87.63493°W
- Owner: Galena and Chicago Union Railroad; Chicago and North Western Railway

History
- Opened: 1853
- Closed: June 3, 1911
- Rebuilt: 1871 (following the Great Chicago Fire); 1881

Former services
Preceding station	Chicago and North Western Railway	Following station
Oakley Avenue toward Geneva	Galena Division	Terminus
Kinzie Street Depot toward Milwaukee	Milwaukee Division	Terminus
Location

Wells Street Station was a passenger terminal of the Chicago and North Western Railway, located at the southwest corner of Wells Street and Kinzie Street in Chicago, Illinois. It was replaced in 1911 by the Chicago and North Western Terminal on the other (west) side of the North Branch of the Chicago River, removing passenger trains from the Kinzie Street railroad bridge over the river. The Merchandise Mart opened in 1930 on the land formerly occupied by the station.

== History ==
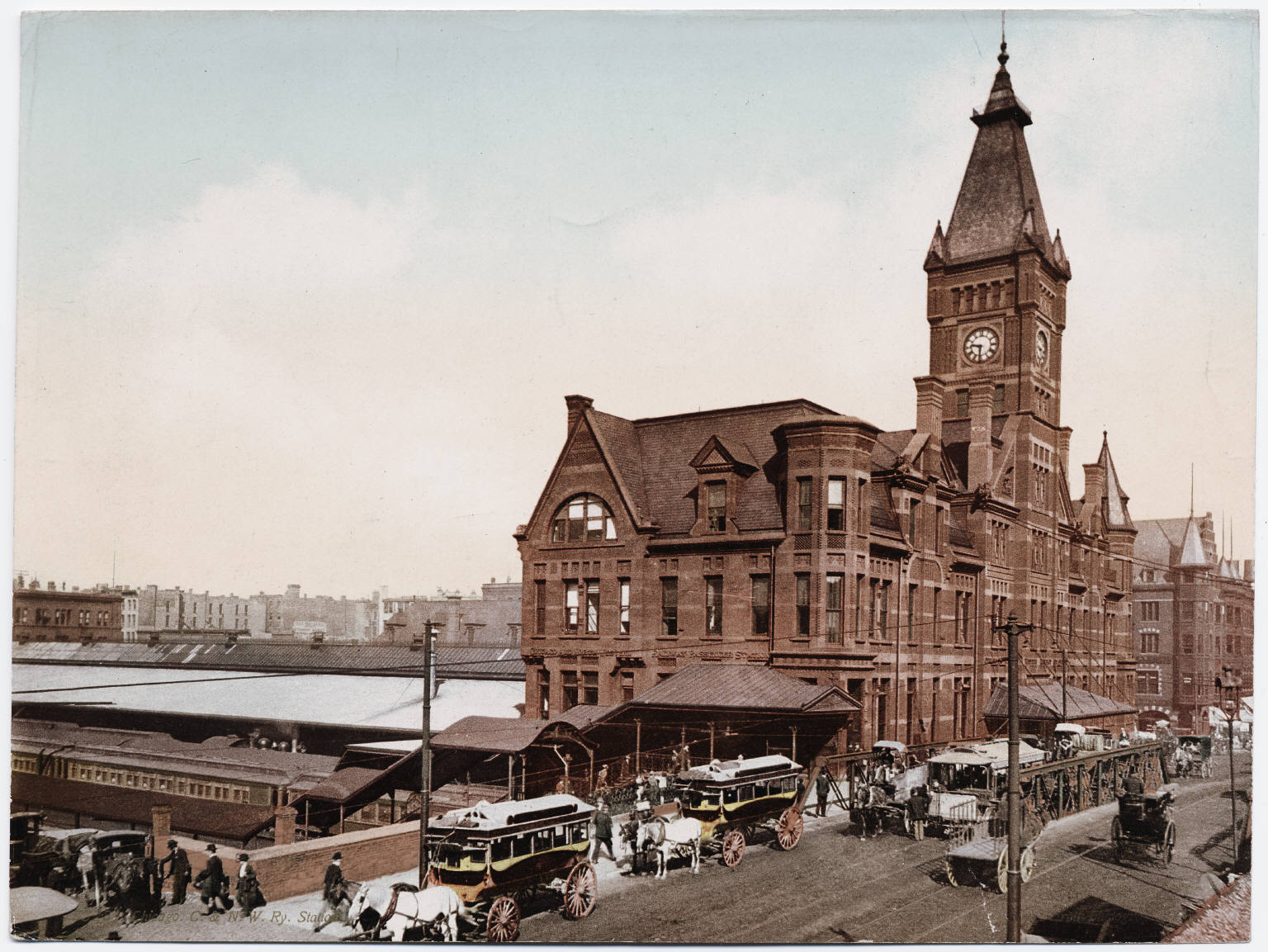
Chicago and North Western's Wells Street Station, ca. 1900

The first station at Wells Street was built by the Galena and Chicago Union Railroad, the first railroad in Chicago. When the railroad opened in 1848 it operated out of the Kinzie Street Depot on the west side of the Chicago River, near the corner of Canal and Kinzie Streets. In 1851 the railroad began to purchase the land needed to build a new station to the east of the river, and construction of this station at Wells Street took place during 1852 and 1853. On February 15, 1865, the Galena and Chicago Union Railroad merged with the Chicago and North Western Railway. The first Wells Street station was destroyed in the Great Chicago Fire of 1871, a temporary wooden structure replaced it until, in 1881 the Wells Street Station opened in the same location.

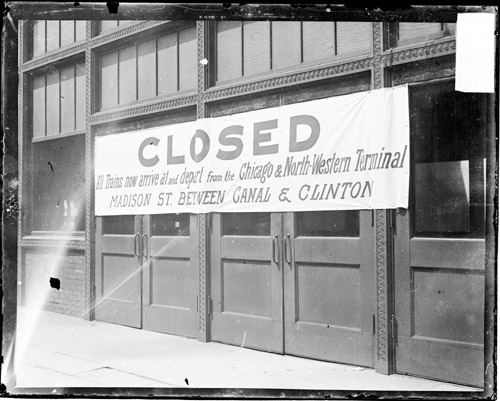
This sign directed passengers to the new Chicago and North Western Terminal on Madison Street.

The Wells Street Station was bounded by the Chicago River to the south and west, Kinzie Street to the north and Wells Street to the east leaving no room for expansion; furthermore, as both rail and ship traffic increased, the movable bridge over the river resulted in congestion. In 1911 the new Chicago and North Western Terminal opened, with new elevated approaches branching from the old ones west of the river. The station remained for freight, and when the Merchandise Mart opened in 1930 (using air rights above the railroad), a new freight station served the Mart, and was connected by elevators to the Chicago Tunnel Company.
