= Archibald Clybourn =

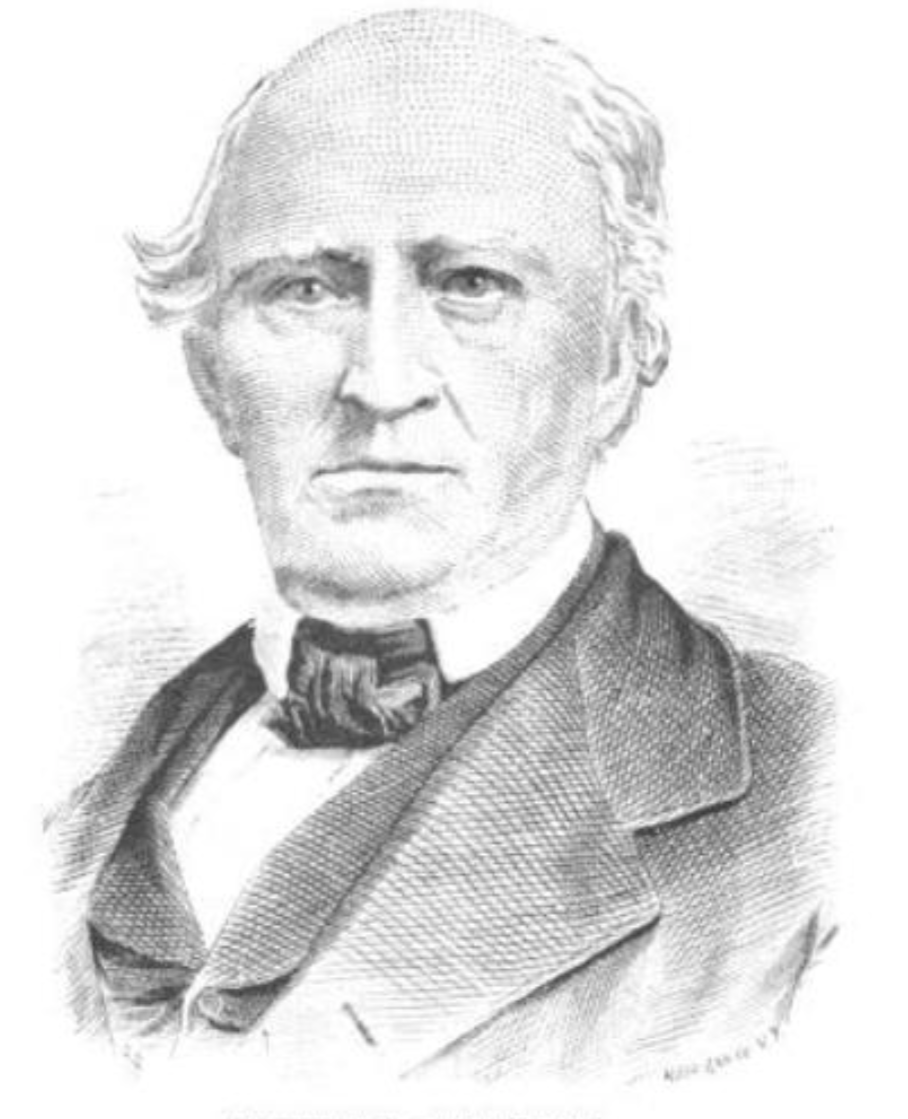

Archibald Clybourn (1802–1872) was an American pioneer, butcher, businessman, politician, and policeman who was an early resident of Chicago.

== Early life and family ==
Clybourn was born in Virginia in 1802, the son of Jonas Clybourn.

Clybourn spelled his name several varying ways, including "Cliborne" when he first arrived in Chicago, and also occasionally as "Clybourne" while doing business. The "Clybourn" spelling is on his gravestone. That spelling is also used for his namesake Chicago street, Clybourn Avenue.

== Career in Chicago ==
Clybourn arrived in Chicago in 1823. He traveled back to Virginia the following year and returned to Chicago with his parents, who also settled in Chicago. He and his father were early butchers in Chicago.

In 1825, Clybourn was appointed as Chicago's first constable. He was elected outright to the office in 1826. At the time, Chicago was still a part of Peoria County, as Cook County had yet to be established. On June 2, 1829, Clybourn and Samuel Miller were authorized to operate the first ferry across the Chicago River. Clybourn worked as the ferry man, crossing the North Branch of the river between Miller's tavern and the Wolf Point Tavern (at Wolf Point).

Mansion that Cylbourn constructed in Chicago

In 1831, near Elston and Armitage, Clybourn constructed the city's first stockyard. This played a key role in establishing the meat-packing industry in Chicago, which ultimately established the city as the one-time "hog butcher to the world". Clybourn and his father secured a contract selling beef to Fort Dearborn for provisions. Soon after the contract, he had enough money to build himself a 20-room mansion on Elston Road. It is considered the city's first mansion. In 1831, Club Clybourn and his father also provided meat which fed those seeking refuge in Chicago during the Black Hawk War in 1832.

In 1829, Clybourn, Miller, and Jean Baptiste Beaubien were made the first school trustees of Chicago. In 1831, he was appointed justice of the peace. From March 1831 through March 1834, he served as the Cook County treasurer.

== Personal life and legacy ==
Clybourn wed Mary Galloway in 1829. They raised their family in the large mansion he built on Elston Road. As an adult, one of their sons, James A. Clybourn, continued the family butcher business.

Clybourn died in 1872 in his Chicago mansion. He is buried in Rosehill Cemetery. His wife was also buried their after dying in 1904.

Clybourn is the namesake source of Clybourn Avenue, Clybourn Corridor, and Clybourn Park, all in Chicago.
