= Kinzie Street railroad bridge =

Bridge in Chicago

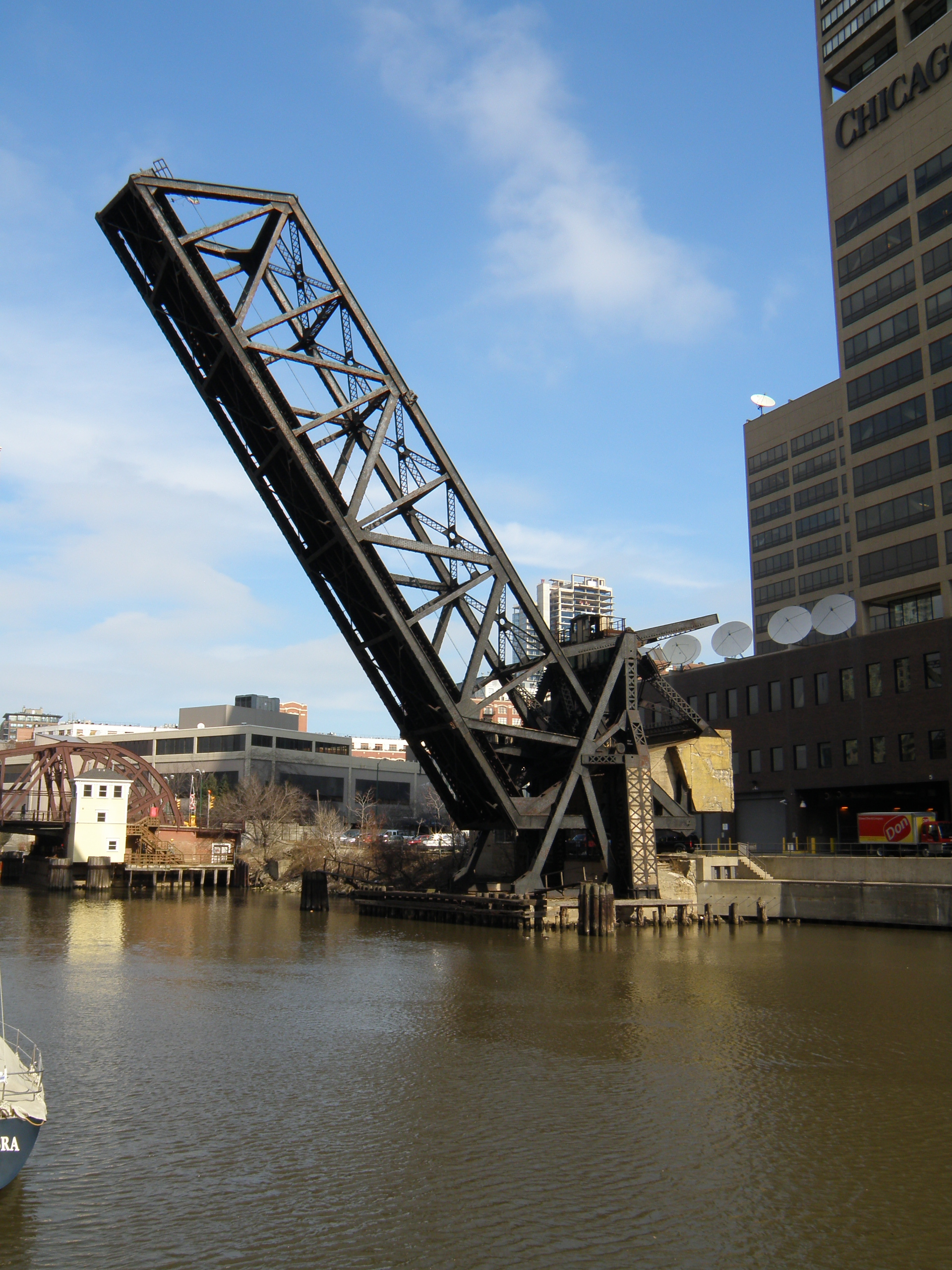
- Kinzie Street railroad bridge permanently locked in the raised position
- Coordinates: 41°53′18.7″N 87°38′21″W
- Crosses: Chicago River
- Locale: Chicago
- Official name: Chicago and North Western Railway, Kinzie Street Bridge
- Other name(s): Carroll Avenue bridge
- Owner: Union Pacific Railroad
- Heritage status: Chicago Landmark

Characteristics
- Design: bascule bridge
- Total length: 195.83 feet (59.69 m)
- Width: 41.7 feet (12.7 m)
- Longest span: 170 feet (52 m)

History
- Construction start: December 1907
- Opened: September 19, 1908

The Chicago and North Western Railway's Kinzie Street railroad bridge (also known as the Carroll Avenue bridge or the Chicago and North Western Railroad Bridge) is a single leaf bascule bridge across the north branch of the Chicago River in downtown Chicago, Illinois. At the time of its opening in 1908 it was the world's longest and heaviest bascule bridge. The previous bridges on the same site included a pedestrian span that was the first bridge across the Chicago River; a second bridge that served as Chicago's first railroad bridge; and a third bridge that was one of the first all-steel spans in the United States.

The Chicago Sun-Times, the last railroad customer to the east of the bridge, moved their printing plant out of downtown Chicago in 2000, and the bridge has been unused since. It was designated a Chicago Landmark in 2007. The bridge is lowered once a year and inspected by crew driving a Hi-Rail truck, and is still in "active" status.

== Location ==
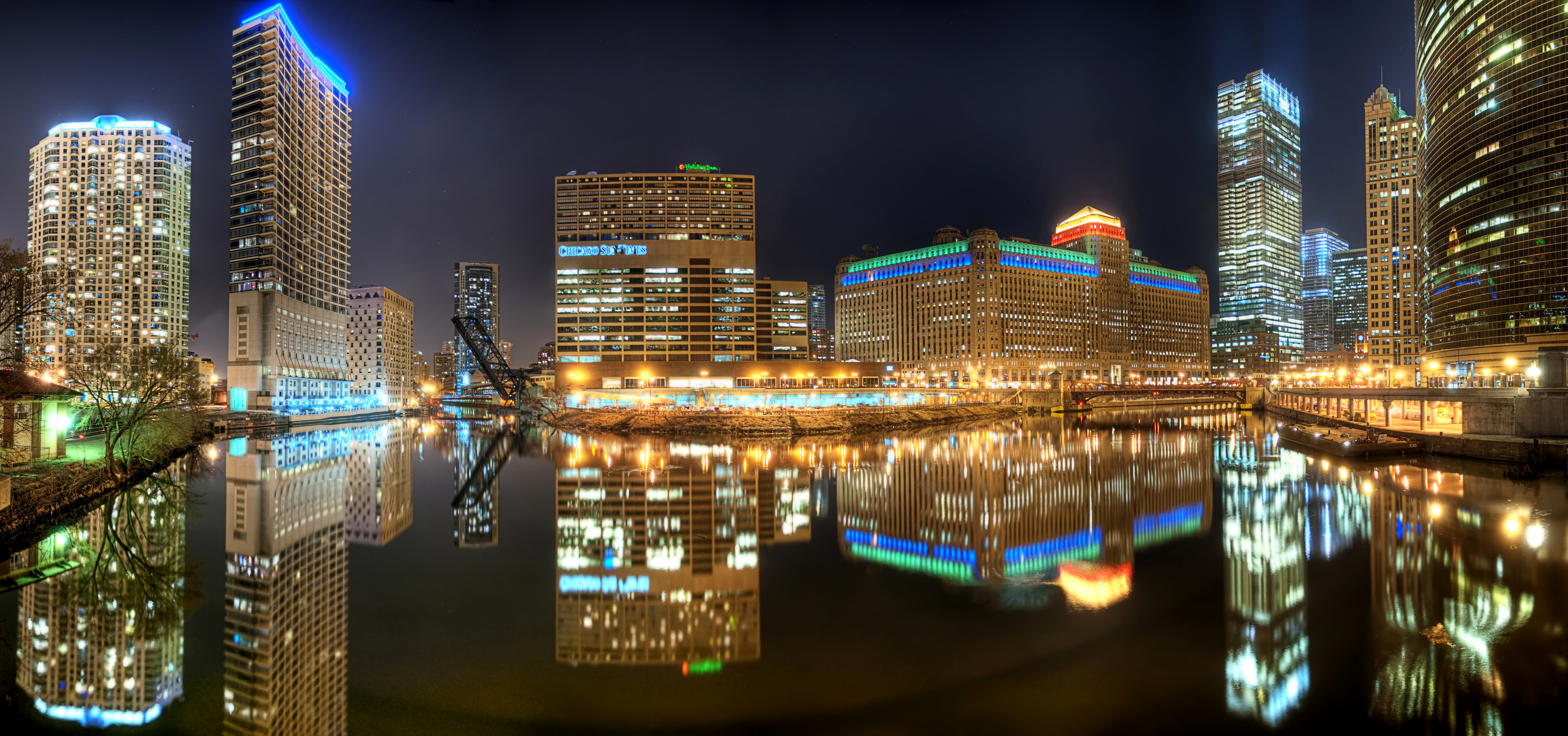
Night view looking north from Lake Street bridge showing Wolf Point and Kinzie Street railroad bridge. Among the buildings and structures shown are (left to right) Left Bank at K Station (300 North Canal), 333 North Canal, Kinzie Street railroad bridge, 350 North Orleans, Merchandise Mart, 300 North LaSalle, Franklin Street Bridge and part of 333 Wacker Drive.

The Kinzie Street railroad bridge runs in an east–west orientation, spanning the north branch Chicago River between the Near North Side and Near West Side community areas of Chicago. To the south is the historic area of Wolf Point at the confluence of the main stem of the Chicago River with the north and south branches, and to the east is 350 West Mart Center and Merchandise Mart. The railroad track across the bridge is a spur line of the Union Pacific Railroad, that branches off from the route of the Union Pacific North Line about 1 mile (1.6 km) northwest of the bridge. The railroad to the east of the bridge has no customers since 2000.

== Previous bridges ==
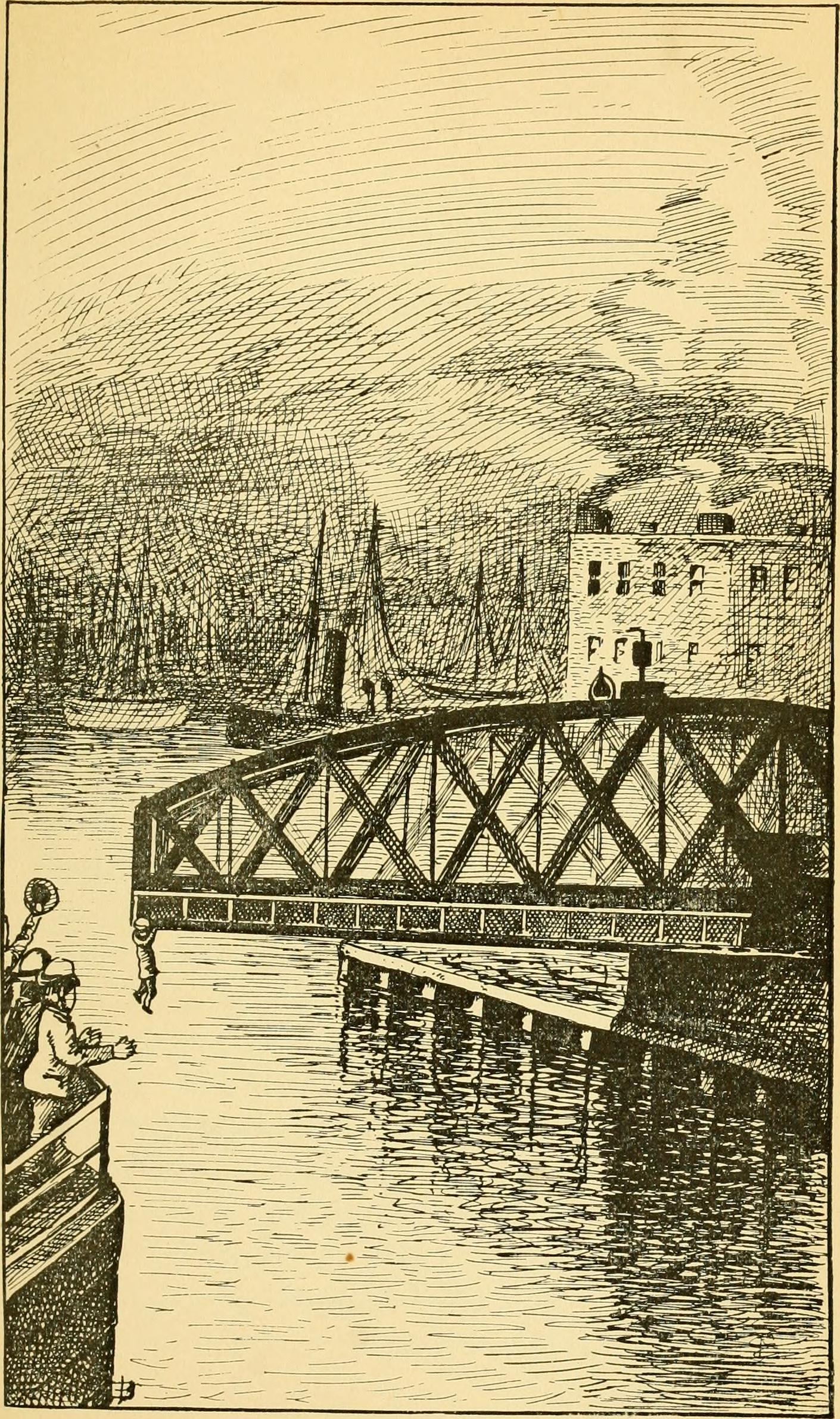
Railroad bridge in 1865.

Through the 1820s a small settlement grew around Wolf Point, at the forks of the Chicago River. In June 1829, Samuel Miller—who owned a tavern on the north shore of the river beside the forks—and Archibald Clybourne were authorized to run a ferry across the mouth of the north branch of the river, just south of the present Kinzie Street. By 1832 the ferry had been replaced with a pedestrian bridge that was the first bridge to be constructed across the Chicago River.

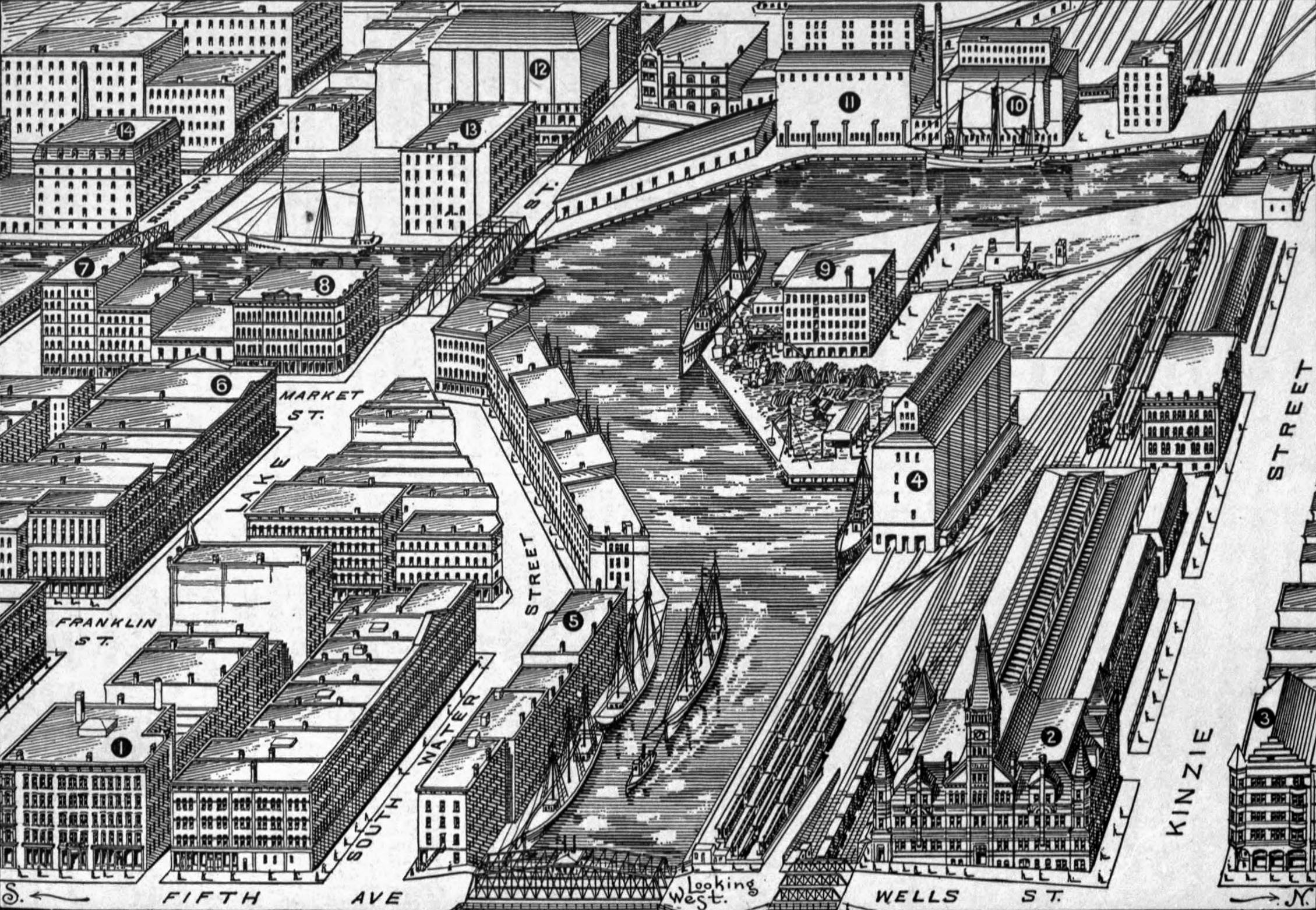
Bird's-eye view of Wolf Point viewed from the east as it appeared in 1893. The 1879–1898 swing bridge is visible in the top right of the drawing.

On October 10, 1848, the Galena and Chicago Union Railroad—Chicago's first railroad—began operating out of a depot on the west side of the Chicago River, near the corner of Canal and Kinzie Streets. Though the City of Chicago had authorized the railroad to construct a bridge across the north branch of the river as early as July 17, 1848, it was not until 1851 that the railroad began to purchase the land needed to build the Wells Street Station to the east of the river. In order to access the new station a floating pontoon bridge designed by Jenks D. Perkins was built across the north branch at roughly the same location as the earlier pedestrian bridge. This bridge—the first railroad bridge in Chicago—was completed in 1852, allowing trains to access the railroad's new Wells Street Station and subsequently industry on the north bank of the Chicago River as far as the Ogden Slip and Navy Pier.

The original railroad bridge was replaced by a swing bridge in 1879 that, along with the Glasgow Railroad Bridge across the Missouri River, was one of the United States' first all-steel railroad bridges. This bridge was constructed from Bessemer steel, which proved too brittle and so the bridge was replaced again in 1898. The replacement bridge was constructed on land and floated into position, allowing the old structure to be removed and the new one put in place in 27½ hours on March 13 and March 14, 1898.

== Bascule bridge ==
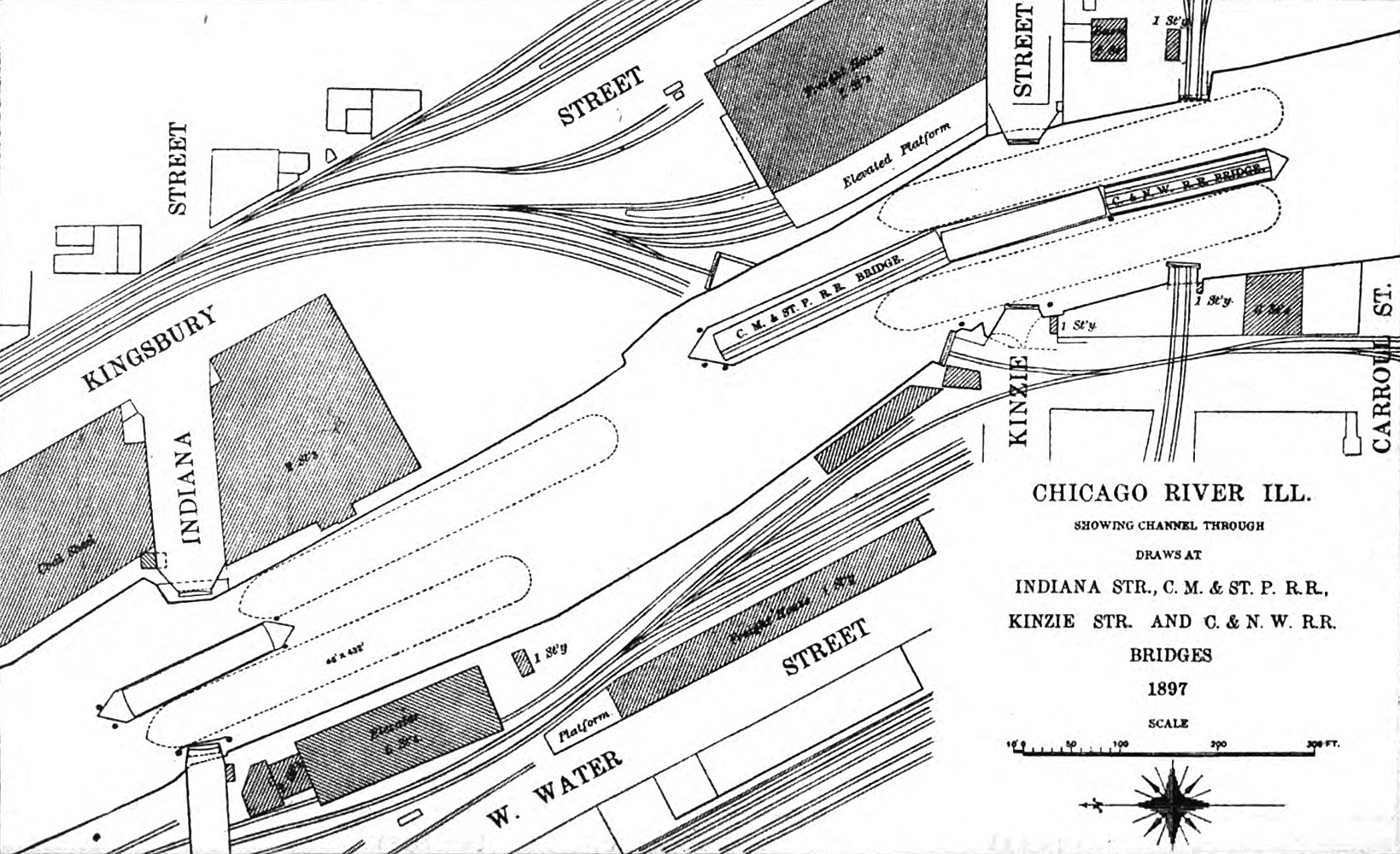
1897 plan of the North Branch of the Chicago River showing the close proximity of the three bridges at Kinzie Street, and the obstruction that they created in the river

River traffic and railroad traffic were increasingly in competition with each other. In October 1879 a disaster was narrowly avoided when a seven-coach passenger train with 800 people on board approached the open swing bridge too fast and was barely able to stop in time, ending up with its front wheels hanging off the approach road over the river. Meanwhile, boats on the river were getting larger and finding it increasingly difficult to navigate the bridges at the mouth of the north branch, so the Army Corps of Engineers ordered the clearing of three swing bridges near Kinzie Street that were obstructing river traffic. Therefore, in 1907 construction started on a new bascule bridge that would allow more space for boats to pass by on the river.

=== Design and construction ===
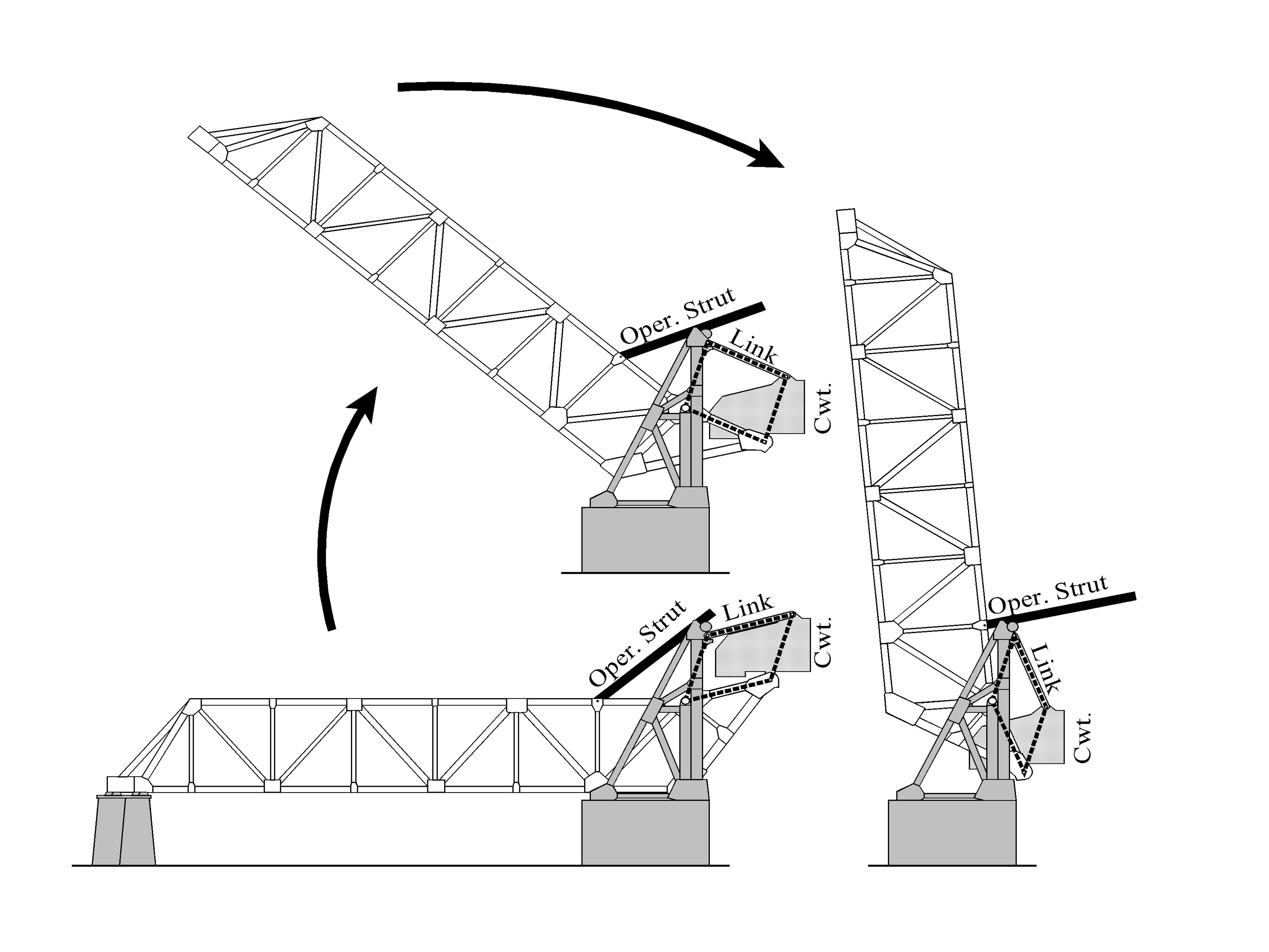
Schematic of Kinzie Street railroad bridge

The bridge is designed to carry two railroad tracks across the river. Its superstructure consists of two spans constructed by the Strauss Bascule & Concrete Bridge Company: a 26-foot (7.9 m) plate-girder span on the west bank of the river and the 170-foot (52 m) movable main span that rests on the east trunnion pier. The size and weight of the main span, which, when completed would be world's longest and heaviest bascule span, required the trunnion pier to be constructed on foundations that extend to the bedrock 94 feet (29 m) below the river bed. To achieve this caissons were sunk to a depth of 29 feet (8.8 m) below the river bed and then 10-foot (3.0 m) diameter wells were sunk the remaining 65 feet (20 m). The substructure of the bridge was constructed by the Great Lakes Dredge and Dock Company.

=== Usage ===
The Chicago and North Western Railway originally planned for two bridges side-by-side that could carry four railroad tracks into the Wells Street Station. However, by the time that the first bridge opened on September 19, 1908, an alternative scheme was already underway that led to the closure of Wells Street Station and its replacement with a new terminal on the west bank of the river. When the new Chicago and Northwestern terminal at 500 Madison Street (now the Ogilvie Transportation Center) opened in 1911, Kinzie Street railroad bridge was left to handle freight traffic only. In 1930 the Merchandise Mart was opened on the site of the old Wells Street Station. Merchandise Mart was built on air rights of the Chicago and North Western, and in the spring of 1932 the railroad opened a new freight house underneath the building that was designed to handle 1,000 short tons (910,000 kg) of outbound and 600 short tons (540,000 kg) of inbound freight per day.

=== Abandonment ===
During the second half of the 20th century the number of companies using the railroad for shipping on Chicago's near north side declined severely. In the 1970s customers at the east end of the line included the Curtiss candy factory and the Jardine Water Purification Plant. The construction of the Columbus Drive Bridge in 1982 wiped out part of the right of way and the spur to Navy Pier was abandoned. Service to the Tribune Tower also ended in the 1980s, and by the 1990s traffic along the remaining section of the spur served only one customer, the Chicago Sun-Times, with only one train per day. The newspaper moved their printing plant out of downtown Chicago in early 2001 leaving no traffic across the bridge and it has since been permanently raised in the open position. On December 12, 2007, the bridge was one of 12 historic Chicago railroad bridges to be designated as Chicago Landmarks.

=== Proposals for reuse ===
Tests were conducted in 1953 to see if the spur could be used as a part of a commuter line with stops at Merchandise Mart, State Street, and Michigan Avenue, but the plan was dropped in 1954 for financial reasons. In the 1970s architect Harry Weese suggested a light rail line along the spur to connect Chicago's downtown stations with the River North neighborhoods. In 2008 the City of Chicago Department of Transportation commissioned an alternatives analysis to look at a proposal to create a transit link from Union Station and the Ogilvie Transportation Center to Michigan Avenue using the Union Pacific train tunnel running under the Apparel Center, the Merchandise Mart and other buildings east toward North Michigan Avenue. The proposed Carroll Avenue Transitway would include the retrofitting of Kinzie Street railroad bridge to carry buses or trams.

== See also ==
- List of bridges documented by the Historic American Engineering Record in Illinois
