= 300 North LaSalle =

Skyscraper in Chicago, Illinois

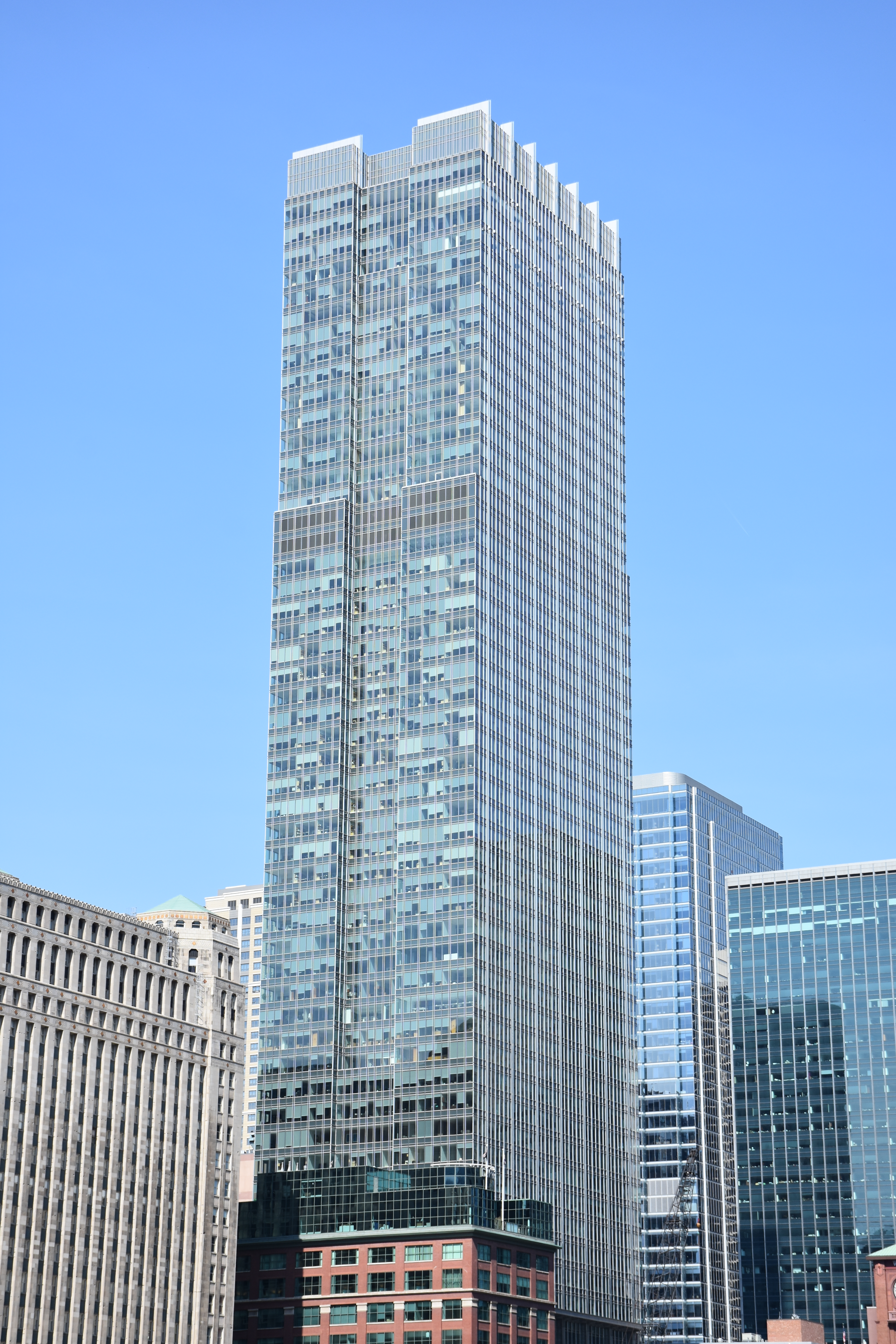
- 300 North LaSalle

- Location within Chicago metropolitan area 300 North LaSalle (Illinois) 300 North LaSalle (the United States)

General information
- Type: Mixed
- Location: 321 North LaSalle St; Chicago, Illinois
- Coordinates: 41.8882°N 87.6331°W
- Construction started: 2006
- Completed: 2009
- Owner: Irvine Company

Height
- Roof: 239 m (784 ft)

Technical details
- Floor count: 60
- Floor area: 120,770 square metres (1,300,000 sq ft)

Design and construction
- Architect: Pickard Chilton
- Developer: Hines
- Structural engineer: Magnusson Klemencic Associates
- Main contractor: Clark Construction

300 North LaSalle is a 60-story mixed-use building, constructed from 2006 to 2009, located on the north bank of the Chicago River on the Near North Side community area of Chicago, Illinois, United States. The building contains 1.3 million square feet (121,770 square meters) of space to include offices, retail shops, restaurants and public spaces, as well as three levels of underground parking. Due to its location on the north bank of the Chicago River, the building features a half-acre sunlit waterfront public garden with direct access to the river's edge. The structural steel was fabricated and erected by Cives Steel Co. and detailed by Maine Detailers, a division of Cives Steel Co. The building is owned by the Irvine Company.

== Green Building ==
300 North LaSalle achieved Platinum certification under the U.S. Green Building Council's LEED for Existing Buildings (EB) category, the highest rating possible. The tower previously received Gold certification under the LEED for Core & Shell (CS) Rating System.

== Ownership ==
The building was sold from the Hines companies in 2010, to KBS REIT II, Inc. and then again to The Irvine Company in 2014.

== Tenants ==
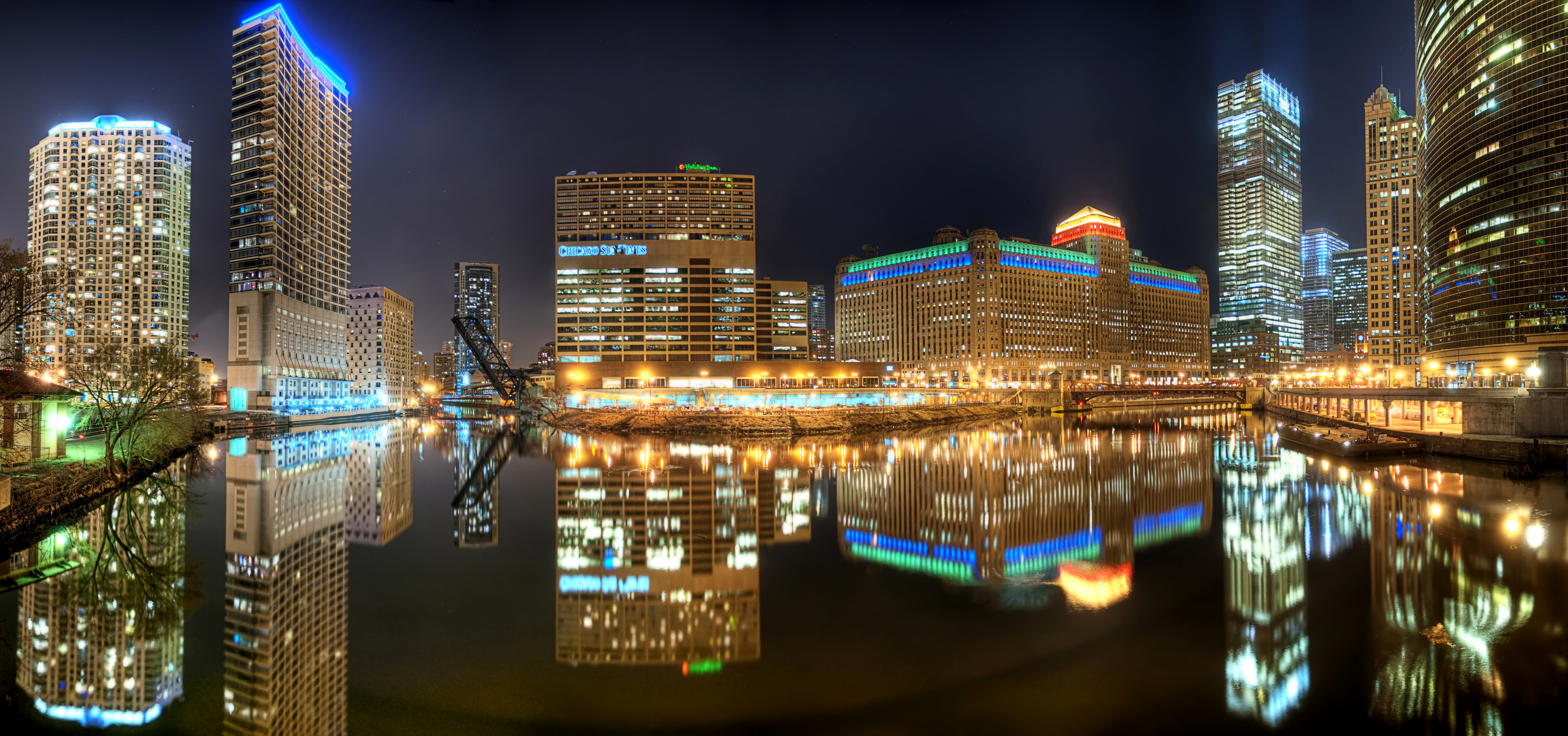
Night view of the building's surroundings to the west along the Chicago River: Among the buildings and structures shown are (left to right) Left Bank at K Station (300 North Canal), 333 North Canal, Kinzie Street railroad bridge, 350 West Mart Center, Merchandise Mart, 300 North LaSalle, Franklin Street Bridge and part of 333 Wacker Drive.

As of July 29, 2010, the building was 93% leased to 24 tenants. Kirkland & Ellis, Chicago's biggest law firm, is the anchor tenant and leases floors in the low-rise and mid-rise sections of the building. Other tenants include the management consulting firms Boston Consulting Group and Roland Berger, private equity firms GTCR and Almus Capital, investment banks Lazard, Moelis & Company and Sagent Advisors, the restructuring and consulting firm AlixPartners, and the corporate law firm Quarles & Brady LLP.

== See also ==
- List of buildings
- List of skyscrapers
- List of tallest buildings in Chicago
- List of tallest buildings in the United States
