= 350 North Orleans =

Skyscraper in Chicago, Illinois

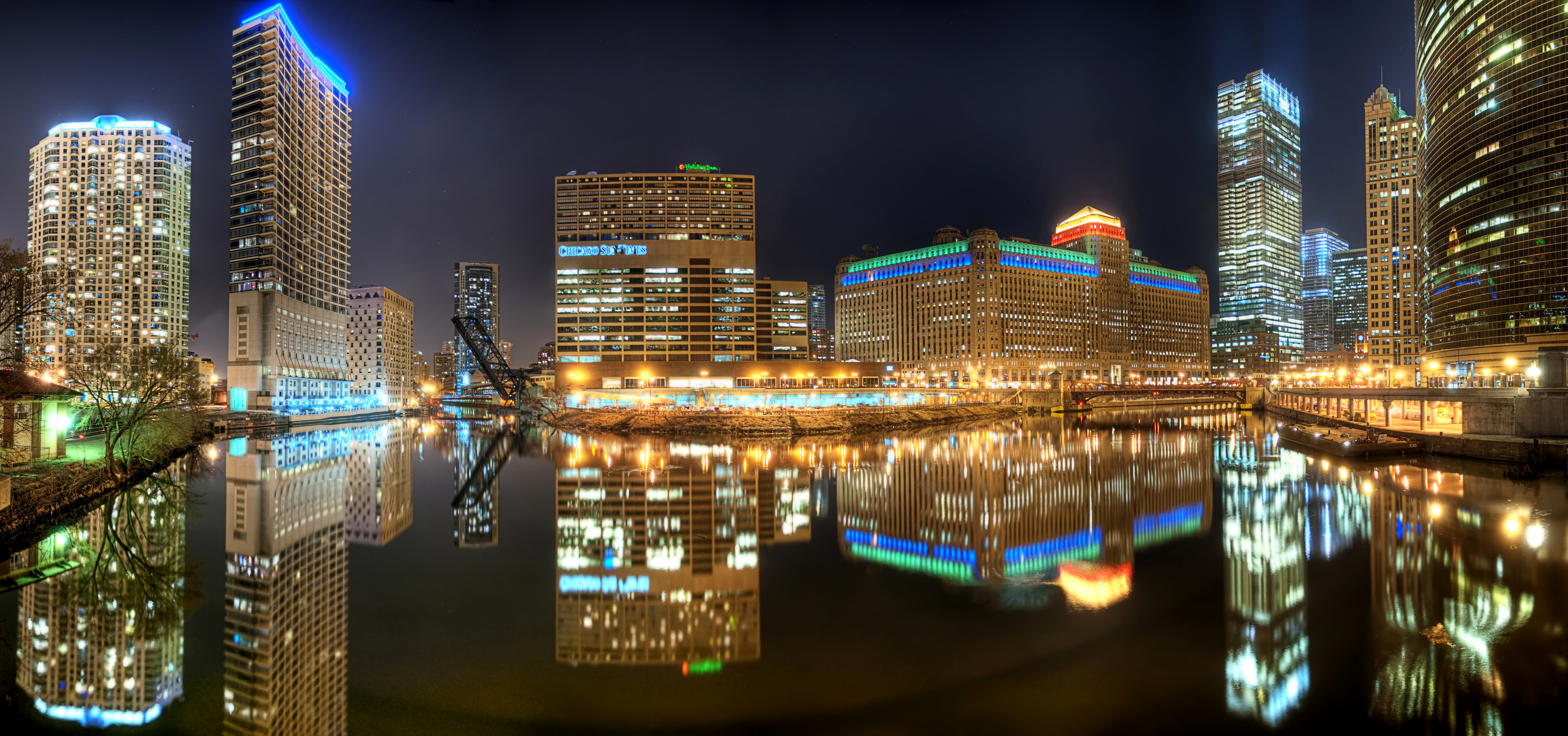
- 350 North Orleans sits at a juncture in the Chicago River known as Wolf Point. Among the buildings and structures shown are (left to right) Left Bank at K Station (300 North Canal), 333 North Canal, Kinzie Street railroad bridge, 350 North Orleans, Merchandise Mart, 300 North LaSalle, Franklin Street Bridge and part of 333 Wacker Drive.

General information
- Type: Mixed-use
- Location: 350 North Orleans Street; Chicago, Illinois
- Coordinates: 41.887726°N 87.637263°W
- Construction started: 1976
- Completed: 1977
- Opening: November 6, 1976 (Grand Opening January 22, 1977)
- Owner: The Blackstone Group

Technical details
- Floor count: 24
- Floor area: 2,000,000 square feet (190,000 m^{2})

Design and construction
- Architect: Skidmore, Owings & Merrill

350 North Orleans (formerly known as River North Point) is the official name of the 24-floor multipurpose building located in the River North community area of Chicago, at the intersection of the North Branch and the Main Branch of the Chicago River. It was designed by Skidmore, Owings & Merrill. In 1988, Helmut Jahn designed an enclosed pedestrian walking bridge over Orleans Street connecting the building to Merchandise Mart. Originally built to serve as the world's largest wholesale buying center for the clothing industry, the building has more commonly known by several other names including River North Point, The Apparel Mart, and the Chicago Apparel Center. The building opened on November 6, 1976.

The property was formerly owned by Marshall Field who sold it to Joseph P. Kennedy and the building's grand opening was attended by the entire Kennedy family. The family owned the land upon which the building was constructed for over 50 years. After the building was constructed in 1976, it remained in the family for over 20 years, but was sold to Vornado Realty Trust in 1998 as part of a larger $625 million ($1,234.6 million today) transaction including Merchandise Mart and several other properties. Shorenstein Realty Services purchased the building in 2012 and subsequently sold to The Blackstone Group in 2015.

As of 2025 The Blackstone Group faces foreclosure on the property.

== Background ==
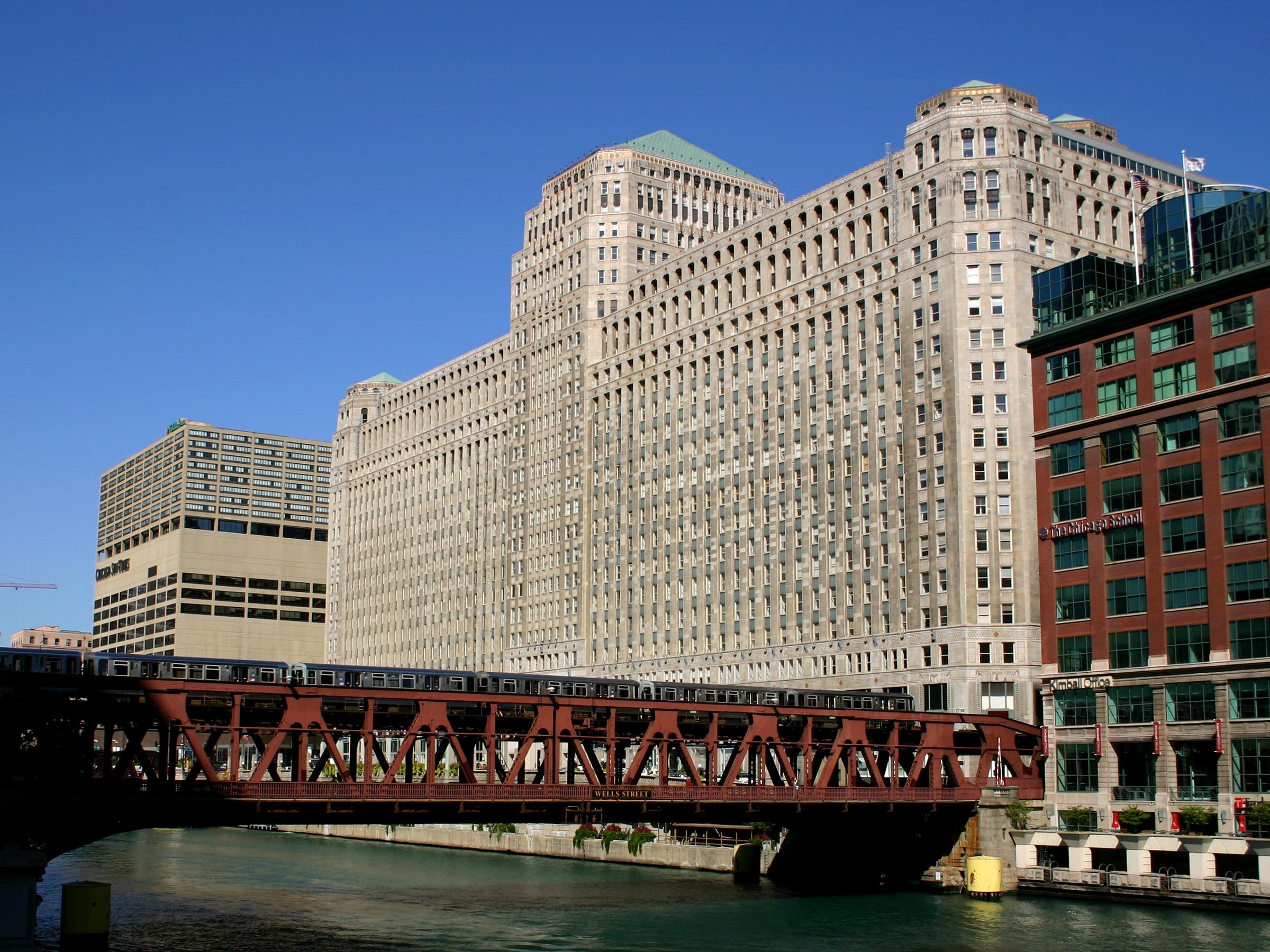
350 N. Orleans sits west of the Merchandise Mart

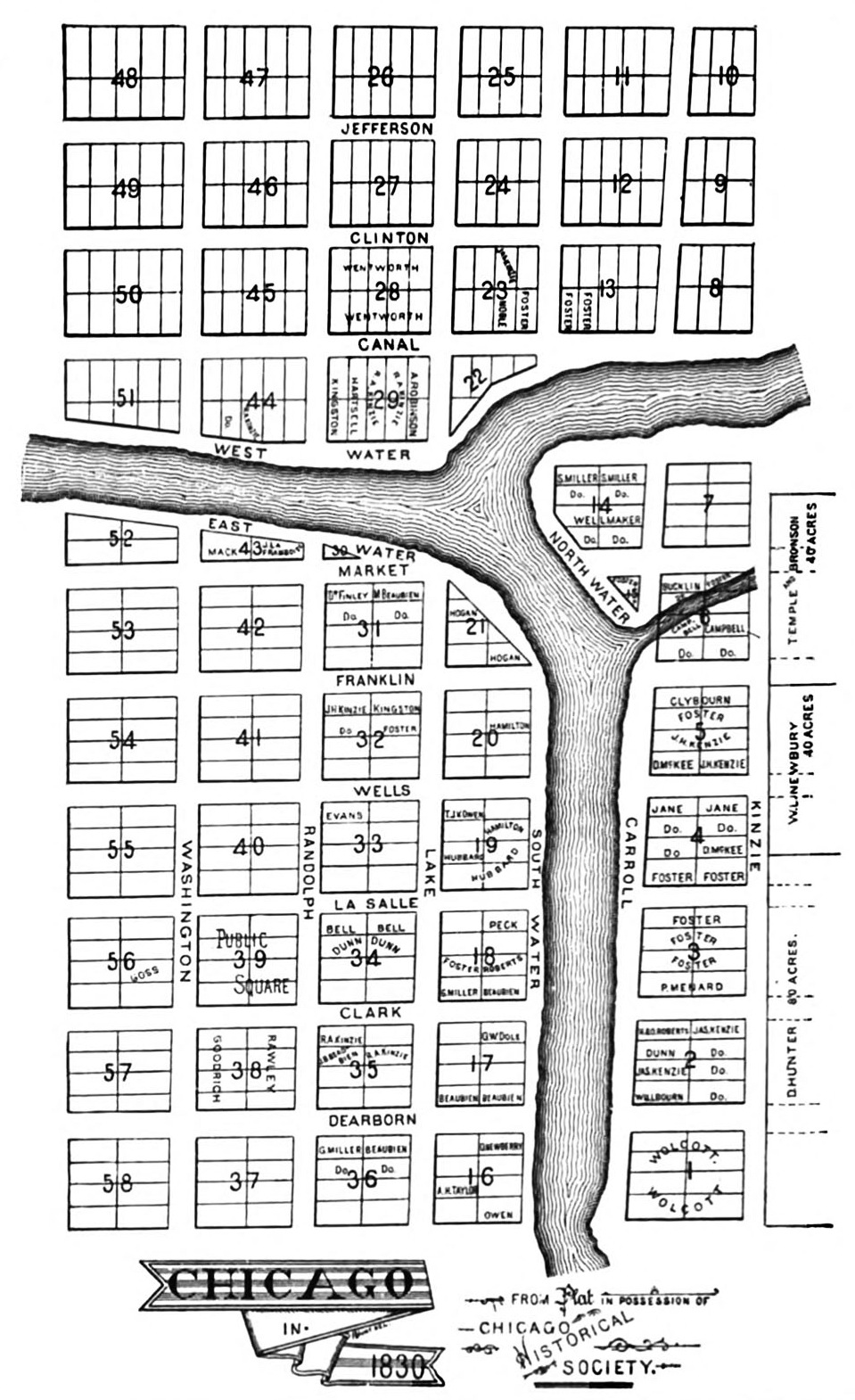
Thompson's original 1830 58-block plat of Chicago (right is north) with block 7 representing the current location of the Apparel Center.

The building is associated with the neighboring Merchandise Mart to its east, which it is connected to by way of an enclosed pedestrian walkway and the two buildings are sometimes jointly referred to as the Merchandise Mart and Apparel Center or Merchandise Mart and Apparel Center Annex. The building is one of four distinct properties that are known as Chicago's Mart Center complex, also known as World Trade Center Chicago: The Merchandise Mart, the Chicago Apparel Center, the Merchandise Mart ExpoCenter and Wolf Point. In James Thompson's original 58-block 1830 plat of Chicago, the property upon which the building is situated is represented by what was then designated as "Block 7" and a large portion of "Block 6", both of which are located at the fork of the Chicago River.

When the building was constructed, it was the world's largest wholesale buying center, featuring over 1,000 display showrooms representing over 3,000 clothing lines. It was Chicago's attempt to replace New York City, where businessmen have to travel to 20 different buildings to see a comparable variety of clothing as the world's fashion center. Its completion bolstered the Merchandise Mart's claim of being the "World's Largest Wholesale Buying Center". The building was completed just as the downtown office space market recovered from the 1973–75 recession and was part of a boom of Near North Side hotel constructions. The adjacent parking lot has approximately 450 parking spaces. The grand opening ceremony on January 22, 1977, was attended by the Kennedy family, as well as Chicago Mayor Michael Bilandic. The grand opening celebration included a fashion show attended by 1,200 people.

The Kennedy-Vornado transaction occurred during an urban commercial real estate recovery that also saw the Sears Tower change hands at approximately the same time. Kennedy had purchased the property in 1945 or 1946 (depending on the source) from the Marshall Field family. John F. Kennedy Jr. told a joke about Chicago that included the Merchandise Mart and Apparel Center: "In the '40s, my grandfather bought the Merchandise Mart. In the '70s, there was the Apparel Center. And in the '60s election, my family bought 20,000 votes."

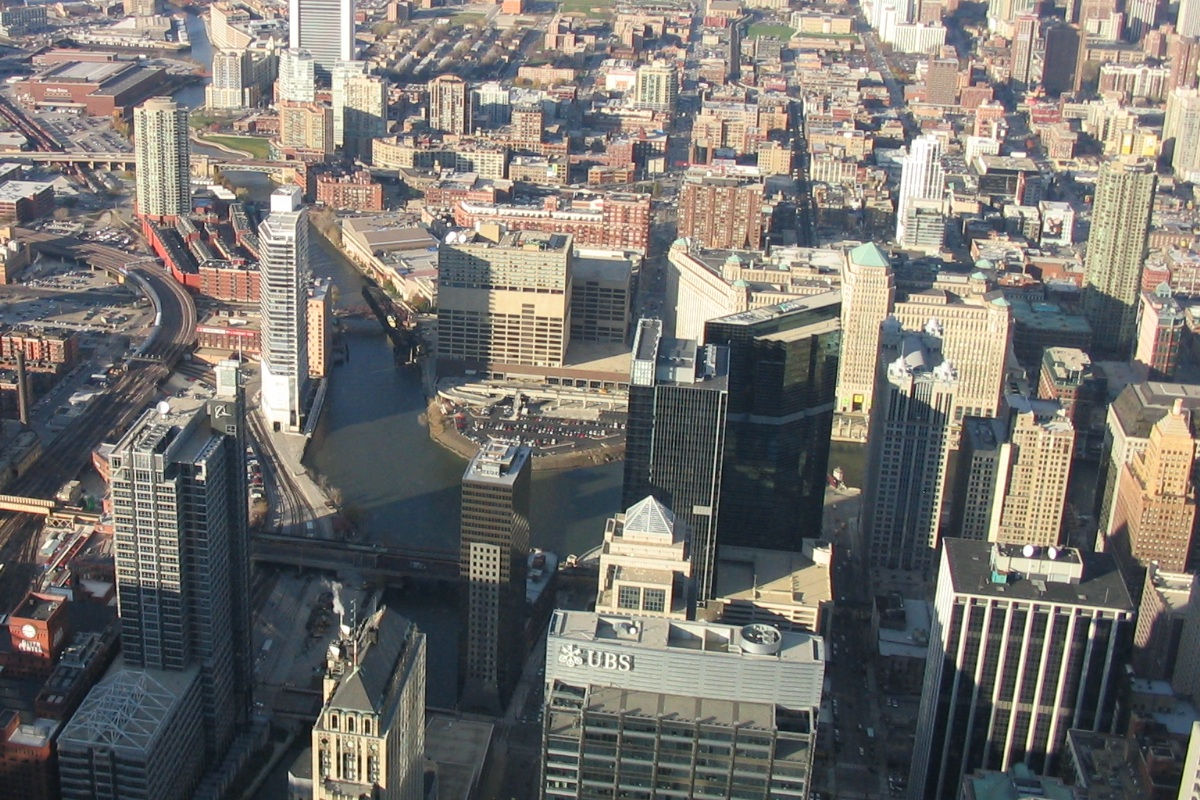
View of Wolf Point, Chicago and the Apparel Center, which is just behind the Wolf Point parking lot (slightly left of center)

The Kennedys retained their interest in Wolf Point, the 4 acres (16,000 m^{2}) of land between Apparel Center and the Chicago River to the south of the building with an address of 340 North Orleans. There have been numerous plans to develop the property dating back to the late 1980s. In 2007, the Kennedys planned to develop the property with three high-rises and skyscrapers according to Cesar Pelli designs. The Wolf Point land is considered to have been the focal point of the earliest settlements in Chicago at the beginning of the 19th century.

In May 2015 The Blackstone Group purchased 350 North Orleans for $390 million from San Francisco-based owner Shorenstein Properties. Shorenstein had purchased the property in January 2012 for $228 million and invested an estimated $70 million in it.

== Tenants ==
2011 photograph (facing north)

In 2012 the last of the apparel showroom Tenants vacated and the building was converted to 100% commercial office. The existing Tenant base is primarily marketing firms and commodity trading firms. The largest tenants include GGP, WPP plc (Ogilvy (agency) and Ronin Capital.

Tenant list:

- Great Wolf Lodge (corporate headquarters) - The facility, the "Great Wolf Den," began operations in 2017. Rahm Emanuel, Mayor of Chicago, attended the facility's opening.

Former tenants:

- Chicago Sun-Times - It occupied the facility for a 13-year period: 2004 to 2017.

== Tenant Amenity Spaces ==
In 2018, the entire facade (from the 3rd floor upwards) was refinished and the original brown aggregate was painted, significantly improving its image. In addition, the building owner redeveloped the existing conference facility and created a Tenant Lounge known as River Room which contains a Tenant exclusive conference facility and approximately 9,000 square feet of high end lounge space for Tenants to meet outside of the office in a more casual setting. River Room has expansive views of the Chicago River and an adjacent bar / eatery is currently under construction.

In May 2018 a high end fitness facility known as Studio350 was constructed in 10,000 square feet of vacant space on the 1st floor. The facility is exclusive to 350 North Orleans tenants and offers a full range of classes (yoga, spinning, strength training) and is operated by LifeStart on behalf of the building owner.

In May 2019 a roof deck opened, also exclusively for building tenants.

== See also ==
- Willis Tower, Chicago
- EQ Office
