= New York City Landmarks Preservation Commission =

New York City agency

Coordinates: 40°42′47″N 74°00′13″W

Landmarks Preservation Commission
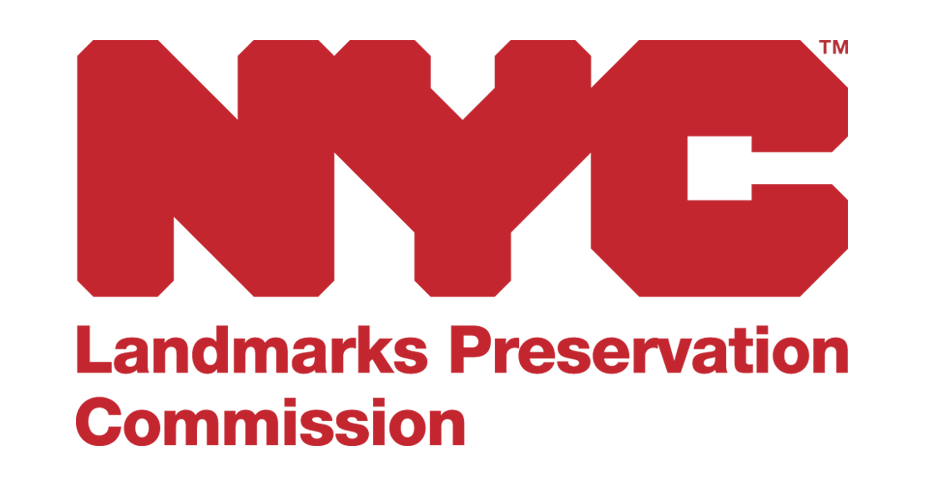

Commission overview
- Formed: April 21, 1962; 64 years ago
- Jurisdiction: New York City
- Headquarters: Home Life Building 253 Broadway, 11th Floor New York, NY 10007
- Commission executive: Lisa Kersavage, Commissioner and Chair
- Website: www.nyc.gov/site/lpc/index.page

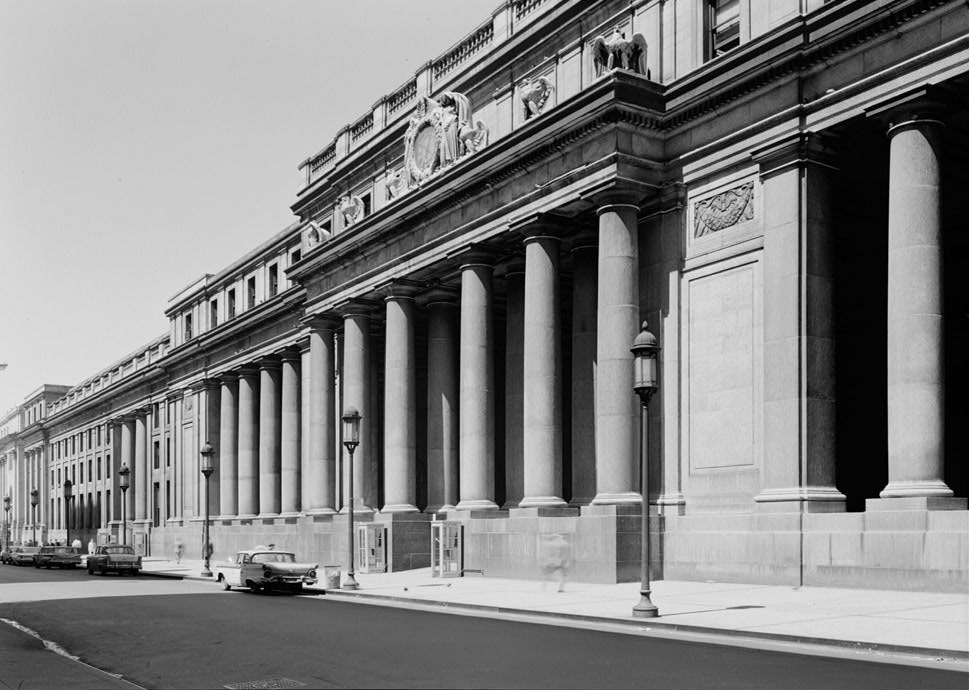
The demolition of Pennsylvania Station was a key moment in the preservationist movement, which led to the creation of the LPC.

The New York City Landmarks Preservation Commission (LPC) is the New York City agency charged with administering the city's Landmarks Preservation Law. The LPC is responsible for protecting New York City's architecturally, historically, and culturally significant buildings and sites by granting them landmark or historic district status, and regulating them after designation. It is the largest municipal preservation agency in the nation. As of July 1, 2020, the LPC has designated more than 37,800 landmark properties in all five boroughs. Most of these are concentrated in historic districts, although there are over a thousand individual landmarks, as well as numerous interior and scenic landmarks.

Mayor Robert F. Wagner Jr. first organized a preservation committee in 1961, and the following year, created the LPC. The LPC's power was greatly strengthened after the Landmarks Law was passed in April 1965, one and a half years after the destruction of Pennsylvania Station. The LPC has been involved in several prominent preservation decisions, including that of Grand Central Terminal. By 1990, the LPC was cited by David Dinkins as having preserved New York City's municipal identity and enhanced the market perception of a number of neighborhoods.

The LPC is governed by eleven commissioners. The Landmarks Preservation Law stipulates that a building must be at least thirty years old before the LPC can declare it a landmark.

== Role ==
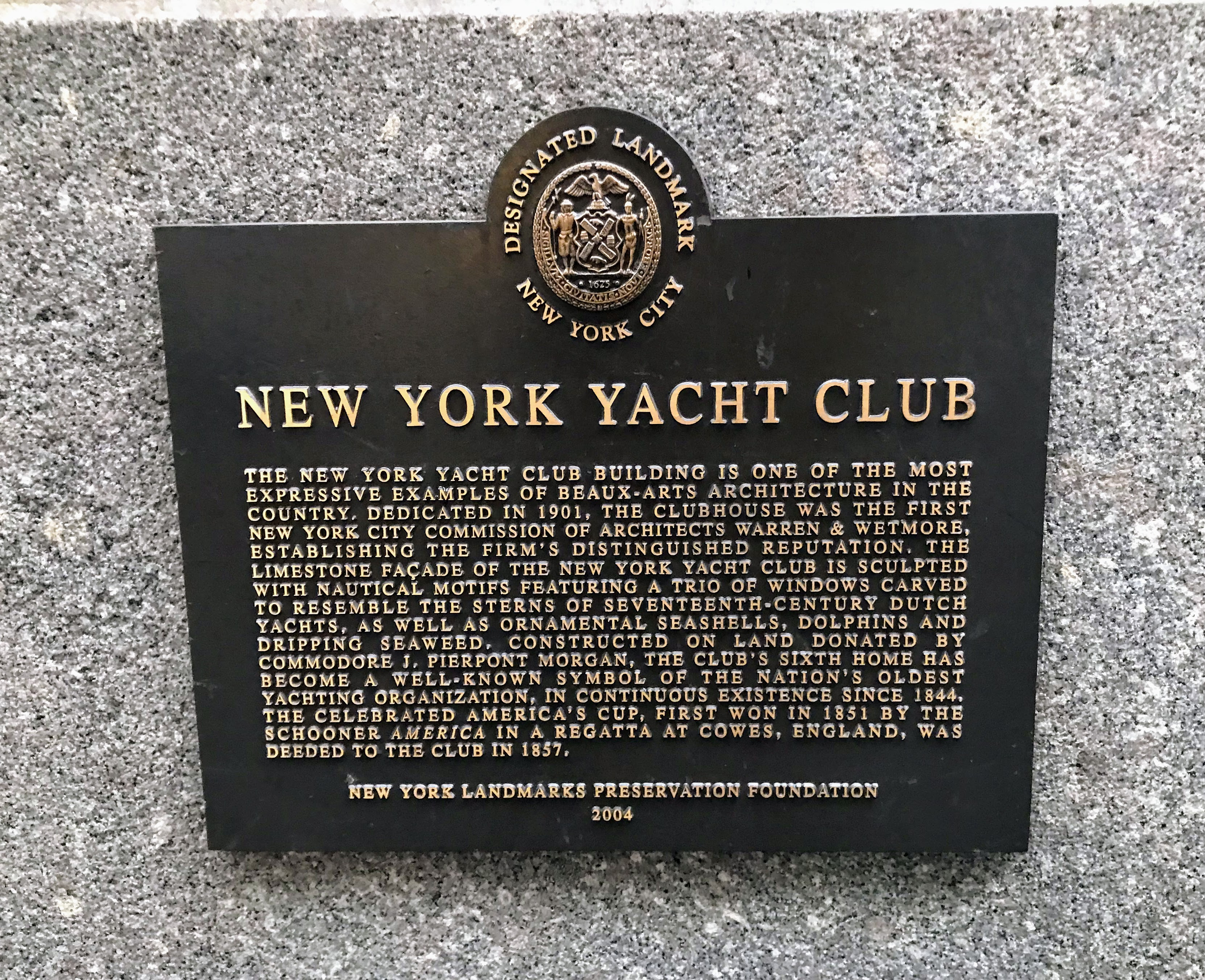
Example of a plaque placed on a Landmark designated building, this example in midtown Manhattan

The goal of New York City's landmarks law is to preserve the aesthetically and historically important buildings, structures, and objects that make up the New York City vista. The Landmarks Preservation Commission is responsible for deciding which properties should be subject to landmark status and enacting regulations to protect the aesthetic and historic nature of these properties. The LPC preserves not only architecturally significant buildings, but the overall historical sense of place of neighborhoods that are designated as historic districts. The LPC is responsible for overseeing a range of designated landmarks in all five boroughs ranging from the Fonthill Castle in the North Bronx, built in 1852 for the actor Edwin Forrest, to the 1670s Conference House in Staten Island, where Benjamin Franklin and John Adams attended a conference aimed at ending the Revolutionary War.

The LPC helps preserve the city's landmark properties by regulating changes to their significant features. The role of the LPC has evolved over time, especially with the changing real estate market in New York City.

Potential landmarks are first nominated to the LPC from citizens, property owners, city government staff, or commissioners or other staff of the LPC. Subsequently, the LPC conducts a survey of properties, visiting sites to determine which structures or properties should be researched further. The selected properties will then be discussed at public hearings where support or opposition to a proposed landmark designation are recorded. According to the Landmarks Preservation Law, a building must be at least thirty years old before the LPC can declare it a landmark. Approval of a landmark designation requires six commissioners to vote in favor. Approved designations are then sent to the New York City Council, which receives reports from other city agencies including the New York City Planning Commission, and decides whether to confirm, modify, or veto the designation. Before 1990, the New York City Board of Estimate held veto power, rather than the City Council. After the City Council's final approval, a landmark designation may be overturned if an appeal is filed within 90 days.

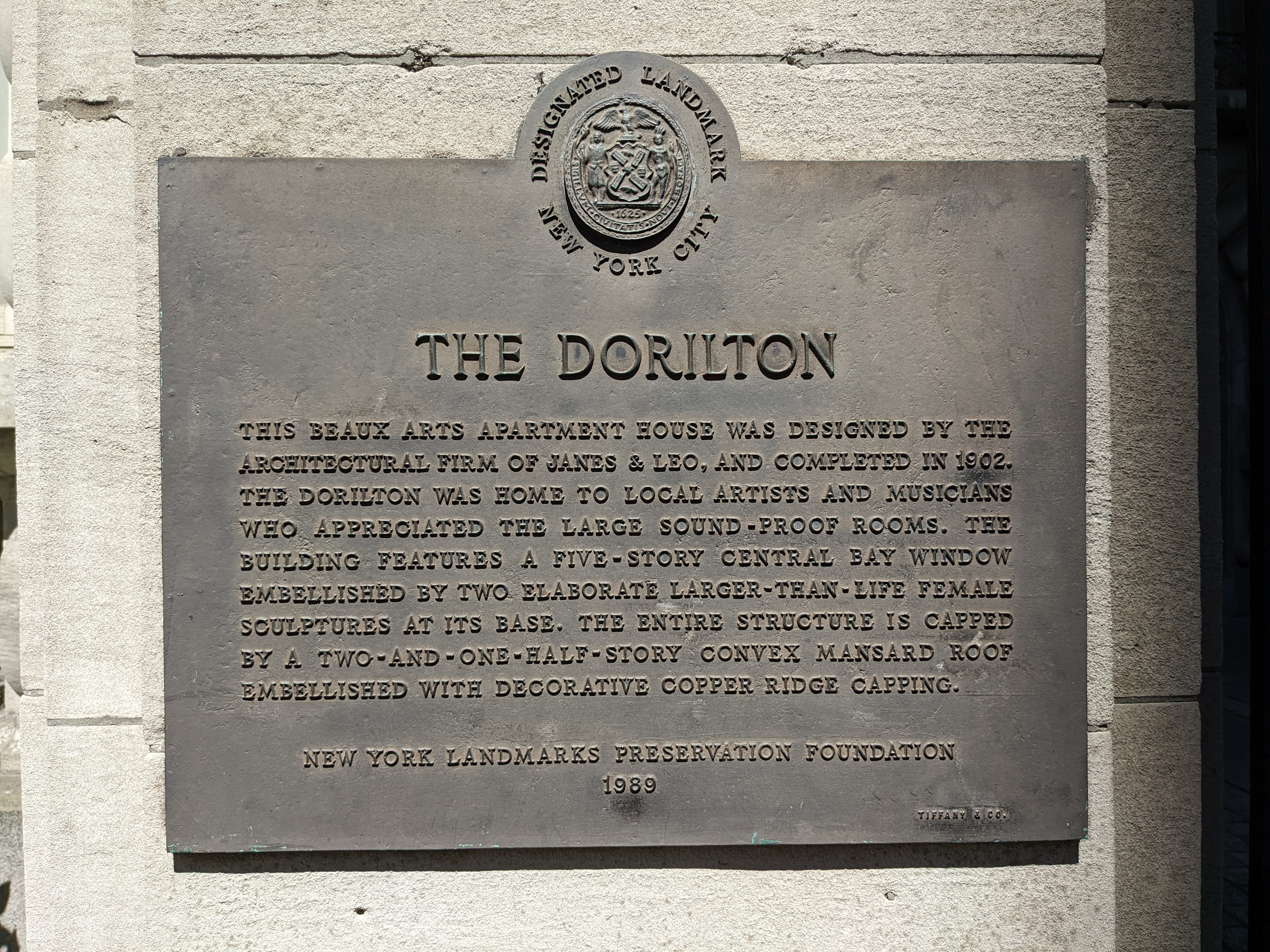
Preservation Foundation plaque

The New York Landmarks Preservation Foundation is a not-for-profit organization, established in 1980 to support the commission. They sponsor plaques, historic district signs, and street signs.

== Staff and departments ==
=== Commissioners ===
The Landmarks Preservation Commission consists of 11 commissioners, who are unpaid and serve three-year terms on a part-time basis. By law, the commissioners must include a minimum of six professionals: three architects, a historian, a city planner or landscape architect, and a realtor. In addition, the commissioners must include at least one resident from each of New York City's five boroughs (who may also be a professional). All of the commissioners are unpaid, except for the chairman. The commission also employs a full-time, paid workforce of 80, composed of administrators, legal advisors, architects, historians, restoration experts, and researchers. Students sponsored by the federal government, as well as volunteers, also assist the commission.

=== Departments ===
The full-time staff, students, and volunteers are divided into six departments. The research department performs research of structures and sites that have been deemed potential landmarks. The preservation department reviews and approves permit applications to structures and sites that have been deemed landmarks. The enforcement department reviews reports of alleged violations of the Landmarks Law, which includes alterations to a landmark. In 2016, the preservation commission consolidated its archaeological collection of artifacts and launched a reconstructed archaeology department, known as the NYC Archaeological Repository: The Nan A. Rothschild Research Center. Archaeologists work for the center reviewing the impact of proposed subsurface projects, as well as overseeing any archaeological discoveries. The environmental review department uses data from the research and archaeology departments to collect reports for governmental agencies that require environmental review for their projects. Finally, the Historic Preservation Grant Program distributes grants to owners of landmark properties designated by the LPC or on the National Register of Historic Places (NRHP).

== Types ==
As of May 1, 2024, there are more than 37,900 landmark properties in New York City, most of which are located in 150 historic districts in all five boroughs. The total number of protected sites includes 1,460 individual landmarks, 121 interior landmarks, and 12 scenic landmarks. Some of these are also National Historic Landmark (NHL) sites, and many are on the NRHP. As of 2007, the vast majority of interior landmarks are also exterior landmarks or are part of a historic district.

- Individual landmark: The exteriors of objects or structures; the interior is not included unless designated separately. Individual landmarks must be at least 30 years old and contain "a special character or special historical or aesthetic interest or value as part of the development, heritage, or cultural characteristics of the City, state, or nation".
- Interior landmark: The interiors of structures, which fit the individual landmark criteria and are "customarily open or accessible to the public".
- Scenic landmark: Sites owned by the city, which fit the individual landmark criteria and are "parks or other landscape features".
- Historic districts: Regions with buildings that fit the individual landmark criteria and contain "architectural and historical significance". Landmark districts must also be geographically cohesive with a "coherent streetscape" and a "sense of place".

== History ==
=== Context ===
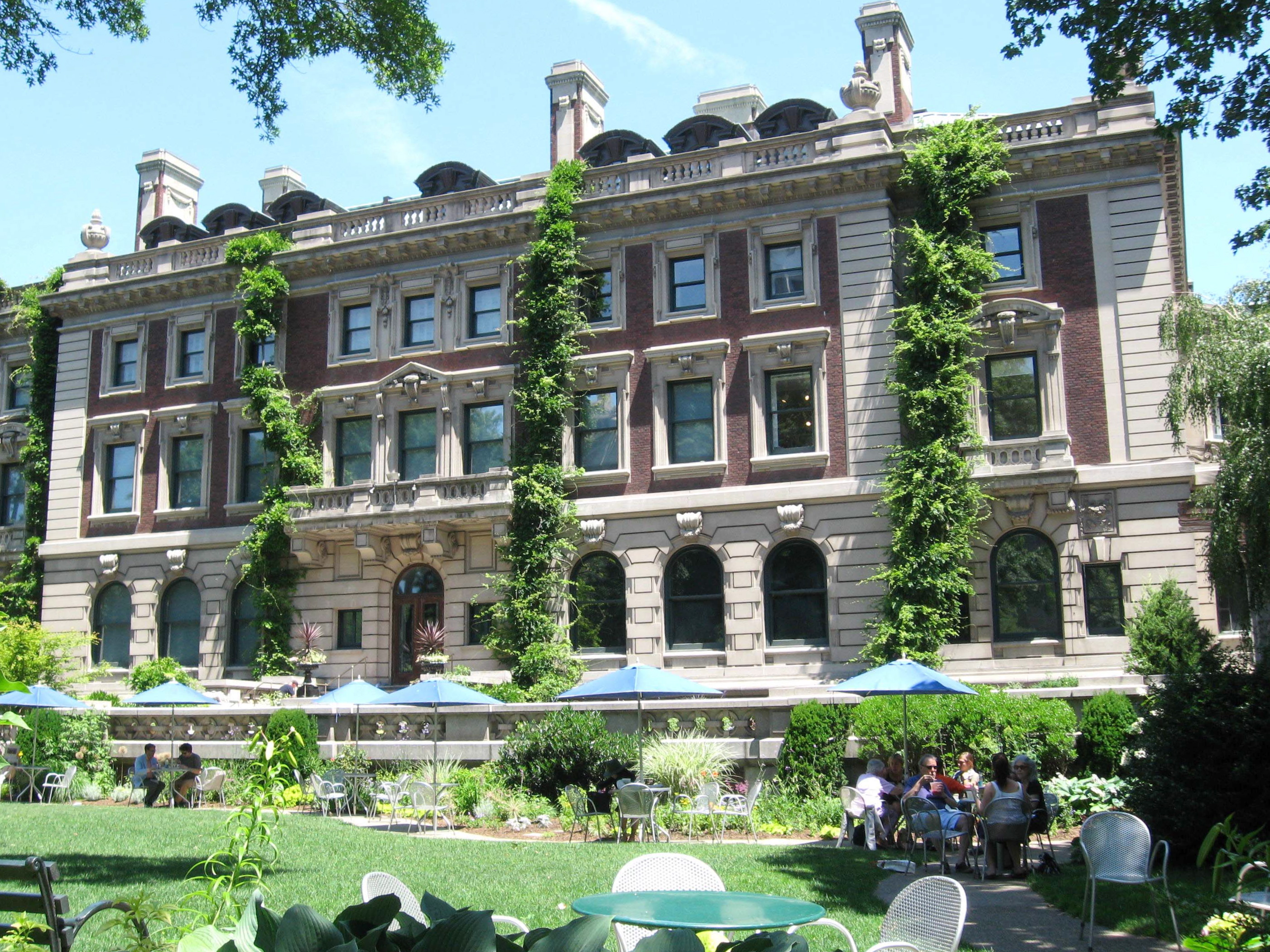
Before the LPC was founded, buildings such as the Andrew Carnegie Mansion were preserved largely based on individual or group advocacy.

The preservation movement in New York City dates to at least 1831, when the New York Evening Post expressed its opposition to the demolition of a 17th-century house on Pearl Street in Lower Manhattan. Before the LPC's creation, buildings and structures were preserved mainly through advocacy, either from individuals or from groups. Numerous residences were saved this way, including the Andrew Carnegie Mansion, Percy R. Pyne House, and Oliver D. Filley House, all of which ultimately became individual landmarks after the LPC's formation. Other structures such as the Van Cortlandt House, Morris–Jumel Mansion, Edgar Allan Poe Cottage, and Dyckman House were preserved as historic house museums during the late 19th and early 20th centuries. Advocates also led efforts to preserve cultural sites such as Carnegie Hall, which in the late 1950s was slated for replacement with an office tower. However, early preservation movements often focused on preserving Colonial-style houses, while paying relatively little attention to other architectural styles or building types.

There was generally little support for the preservation movement until World War II. Structures such as the City Hall Post Office and Courthouse, Madison Square Presbyterian Church (1906), and Madison Square Garden (1890) were demolished if they had fallen out of architectural favor. Others, such as St. John's Chapel, were destroyed in spite of support for preservation. By the 1950s, there was growing support for preservation of architecturally significant structures. For example, a 1954 study found approximately two hundred structures that could potentially be preserved. At the same time, older structures, especially those constructed before World War I, were being perceived as an impediment to development. The demolition of Pennsylvania Station between 1963 and 1966, in spite of widespread outcry, is cited as a catalyst for the architectural preservation movement in the United States, particularly in New York City.

=== Creation ===
The Mayor's Committee for the Preservation of Structures of Historic and Esthetic Importance was formed in mid-1961 by mayor Robert F. Wagner Jr. This committee had dissolved by early 1962. Wagner formed the Landmarks Preservation Commission on April 21, 1962, with twelve unsalaried members. Soon afterward, the LPC began designating buildings as landmarks. That July, Wagner issued an executive order that compelled municipal agencies to notify the LPC of any "proposed public improvements".

The early version of the LPC initially held little power over enforcement, and failed to avert Pennsylvania Station's demolition. As a result, in April 1964, LPC member Geoffrey Platt drafted a New York City Landmarks Law. Outcry over the proposed destruction of the Brokaw Mansion on Manhattan's Upper East Side, identified by the LPC as a possible landmark, inspired Wagner to send the legislation to the New York City Council in mid-1964. The law, introduced in the City Council that October, would significantly increase the LPC's powers. The City Council cited concerns that "the City has been and is undergoing the loss and destruction of its architectural heritage at an alarming rate, especially so in the last 8-10 years". Several changes to the Landmarks Law were made by the City Council committee that was reviewing the legislation; for example, the committee removed a clause mandating a 400 ft (120 m) protective zone around proposed landmarks. The bill passed the City Council on April 7, 1965, and was signed into law by Wagner on April 20.

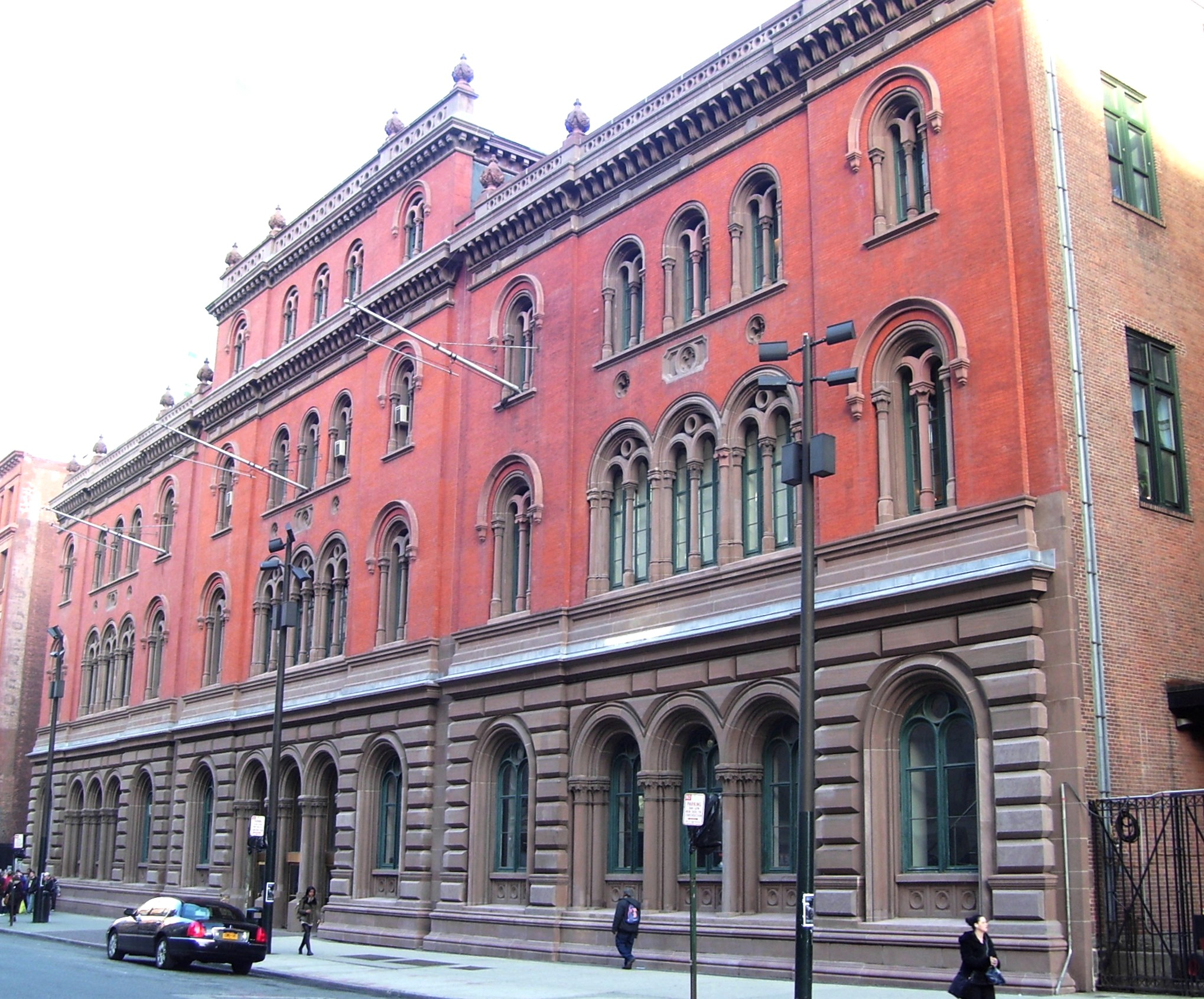
The Astor Library Building was discussed during the commission's first public hearing in 1965.

The first eleven commissioners to take office under the Landmarks Law were sworn in during June 1965. Platt was the first chairman, serving until 1968. The LPC's first public hearing occurred in September 1965, and the first twenty landmarks were designated the next month. The Wyckoff House in Brooklyn was the first landmark numerically, and was designated simultaneously with structures such as the Astor Library Building, the Brooklyn Navy Yard's Commandant's House, the Bowling Green U.S. Custom House, and six buildings at Sailors' Snug Harbor. The first landmark district, the Brooklyn Heights Historic District, was designated in November 1965. Within its first year, the LPC designated 37 landmarks in addition to the Brooklyn Heights Historic District. The LPC's earliest landmarks were mainly selected based on their architecture, and were largely either government buildings, institutions, or structures whose preservation was unlikely to be controversial. As a result, several prominent buildings were destroyed in the first several years of the LPC's existence, such as the Singer Building and the New York Tribune Building. Other structures, such as the Villard Houses and Squadron A Armory, were saved only partially.

=== Changes ===
The LPC was headquartered in the Mutual Reserve Building from 1967 to 1980, and in the Old New York Evening Post Building from 1980 to 1987. The original legislation enabled the LPC to designate landmarks for eighteen months after the law became effective, followed by alternating cycles of three-year hiatuses and six-month "designating periods". In 1973, mayor John Lindsay signed legislation that allowed the LPC to consider landmarks on a rolling basis. The bill also introduced new scenic and interior landmark designations. The first scenic landmark was Central Park in April 1974, while the first interior landmark was part of the neighboring New York Public Library Main Branch in November 1974.

In its first twenty-five years, the LPC designated 856 individual landmarks, 79 interior landmarks, and 9 scenic landmarks, while declaring 52 neighborhoods with more than 15,000 buildings as historic districts. In 1989, when the LPC and its process was under review following a panel created by mayor Edward Koch in 1985, a decision was made to change the process by which buildings are declared to be landmarks due to some perceived issues with the manner by which the LPC operates as well as the realization that the destruction feared when the LPC was formed was no longer imminent. By 1990, the LPC was cited by David Dinkins as having preserved New York City's municipal identity and enhanced the market perception of a number of neighborhoods. This success is believed to be due, in part, to the general acceptance of the LPC by the city's developers.

Under the administration of Mayor Michael Bloomberg from 2002 to 2023, the LPC designated an average of 26 landmarks per year. The tenure of his successor, Bill de Blasio, from 2014 to 2021 saw that number decrease to 16 per year. By 2016, the LPC had designated 1,355 individual landmarks, 117 interior landmarks, 138 historic districts, and 10 scenic landmarks. Under the mayoralty of Eric Adams, between 2022 and 2025, the LPC designated 10 landmarks per year. In 2025, the Commission moved into renovated offices with a new public hearing room at 253 Broadway in the Home Life Building, a designated historic landmark built in 1892. The hearing room's Art Deco-era glass block windows are remnants of the former Longchamps restaurant. According to one report, "The architects designed the space at the commission's request to create a less intimidating space; literal light and internal transparency accomplish much of that."

=== Prominent landmarking decisions ===
One of the most prominent decisions in which the LPC was involved was the preservation of the Grand Central Terminal with the assistance of Jacqueline Kennedy Onassis. In 1978, the United States Supreme Court upheld the law in Penn Central Transportation Co., et al. v. New York City, et al., stopping the Penn Central Railroad from altering the structure and placing a large office tower above it. This success is often cited as significant due to the LPC's origins following the destruction of Pennsylvania Station, referred to by some as architectural vandalism.

In 1989, the LPC designated the Ladies' Mile Historic District. The next year marked the first time in the LPC's history that a proposed landmark, the Guggenheim Museum (one of the youngest declared landmarks), received a unanimous vote by the LPC members. The vast majority of the LPC's actions are not unanimously supported by the LPC members or the community; a number of cases including St. Bartholomew's Episcopal Church, Bryant Park, and Broadway theatres have been challenged. One of the most controversial properties was 2 Columbus Circle, which remained at the center of a discussion over its future for a number of years.

Cultural landmarks, such as Greenwich Village's Stonewall Inn, are recognized as well not for their architecture, but rather for their location in a designated historic district. In 2015, Stonewall became the first official New York City landmark to be designated specifically based on its LGBT cultural significance.

In a heatedly discussed decision on August 3, 2010, the LPC unanimously declined to grant landmark status to a building on Park Place in Manhattan, and thus did not block the construction of Cordoba House.

==== Theater District landmarks ====
A major dispute arose over the preservation of theaters in the Theater District during the 1980s. The LPC considered protecting close to 50 legitimate theaters as individual city landmarks in 1982, following the destruction of the Helen Hayes and Morosco theaters. An advisory panel under mayor Koch voted to allow the LPC consider theaters not only on their historical significance but also on their architectural merits. In response to objections from some of the major theatrical operators, several dozen scenic and lighting designers offered to work on the LPC for creating guidelines for potential landmarks. Theaters were landmarked in alphabetical order; the first theaters to be designated under the 1982 plan were the Neil Simon, Ambassador, and Virginia (now August Wilson) in August 1985. (Note: The Neil Simon had been known as the Alvin Theatre; both its interior and exterior were designated. The Ambassador Theatre's interior and exterior were designated, but the exterior status was later overturned. The Virginia/August Wilson was known as the ANTA Theatre; only its exterior was designated.) The landmark plan was then deferred temporarily until some landmark guidelines were enacted; the guidelines, implemented in December 1985, allowed operators to modify theaters for productions without having to consult the LPC.

Landmark designations of theaters increased significantly in 1987, starting with the Palace in mid-1987. Ultimately, 28 additional theaters were designated as landmarks, of which 27 were Broadway theaters. The New York City Board of Estimate ratified these designations in March 1988. Of these, both the interior and exterior of 19 theaters were protected, while only the interiors of seven theaters (including the Lyceum, whose exterior was already protected) and the exteriors of two theaters were approved. Several theater owners argued that the landmark designations impacted them negatively, despite Koch's outreach to theater owners. The Shubert Organization, the Nederlander Organization, and Jujamcyn Theaters collectively sued the LPC in June 1988 to overturn the landmark designations of 22 theaters on the merit that the designations severely limited the extent to which the theaters could be modified. The New York Supreme Court upheld the LPC's designations of these theaters the next year. The three theatrical operators challenged the ruling with the U.S. Supreme Court, which refused to hear the lawsuit in 1992, thus upholding the designations.

==== South Street Seaport and "New Market Building" ====
An LPC-designated historic district for the South Street Seaport has been active since 1977 and was extended on July 11, 1989. After the Fulton Fish Market relocated to the Bronx in 2005, community members, with leadership from organizer Robert Lavalva, developed the "New Amsterdam Market", a regular gathering with vendors selling regional and "sustainable" foodstuffs outside the old Fish Market buildings. The group's chartered organization planned eventually to attempt to reconstitute the "New Market Building", a 1939 structure with an Art Deco façade and that was owned by the city, into a permanent food market. However, a real estate company, the Howard Hughes Corporation, possessed a lease for large parts of the Seaport area and desired to redevelop it, generating fears among locals that the New Market Building would be altered or destroyed. The corporation has offered to provide a more modest food market (at 10,000 sq ft (930 m^{2})) into their development plans, but market organizers have not been satisfied as they believe this proposal is not guaranteed or large enough, and would still not ensure the protection of the historic building.

A group of community activists formed the "Save Our Seaport Coalition" to advocate that the New Market Building be incorporated into the historic district set by the Landmarks Preservation Commission, in addition to calling for the protection of public space in the neighborhood and for support for the seaport's museum. This group included the Historic Districts Council, the "Save Our Seaport" community group, the New Amsterdam Market, and the Metropolitan Waterfront Alliance. The "Save Our Seaport" group specifically argued that New Market Building was culturally important for its maintenance of the historic fish market for 66 years, and that it offers a "fine example of WPA Moderne municipal architecture (an increasingly rare form throughout the nation)." They had encouraged others to write letters to the LPC to support formal designation or district protection. However, in 2013, the LPC declined to hold a hearing to consider this landmark designation or to expand the district. Community Board 1 supports protecting and repurposing the New Market Building, and the Municipal Art Society argued in a report that "[it] has both architectural and cultural significance as the last functioning site of the important commercial and shipping hub at South Street Seaport."

==== Little Syria and Washington Street ====
After the September 11 attacks in 2001, New York City tour guide Joseph Svehlak and other local historians became concerned that government-encouraged development in Downtown Manhattan would lead to the disappearance of the last physical heritage of the once "low-rise" Lower West Side of Manhattan. Also known as "Little Syria" in the late 19th and early 20th centuries, the area between Battery Park and the World Trade Center site, east of West Street and west of Broadway, had been a residential area for the shipping elite of New York in the early 19th century, and turned into a substantial neighborhood of ethnic immigration in the mid-19th century. In the late 19th and early 20th centuries, centered on Washington Street, the area became well known as Little Syria, hosting immigrants from today's Lebanon, Syria, and Palestine, as well those of many other ethnic groups including Greeks, Armenians, Irish, Slovaks, and Czechs. Due to eminent domain actions associated with the construction of the Brooklyn–Battery Tunnel and the World Trade Center, in addition to significant highrise construction in the 1920s and 30s, only a small number of low-rise historic buildings from the earlier eras remain.

In 2003, Svehlak wrote a manifesto arguing for the landmark designation of "a trilogy" of three contiguous buildings on Washington Street, the thoroughfare that was most closely associated with "Little Syria". These consisted of the Downtown Community House – which hosted the Bowling Green Association to serve the neighborhood's immigrants – 109 Washington Street (an 1885 tenement), and the terra-cotta St. George's Syrian Catholic Church. After years of advocacy, in January 2009, the LPC held a hearing about the landmark designation of the Melkite church, which did succeed. However, under Chairman Robert Tierney, the LPC had declined to hold hearings on the Downtown Community House or 109 Washington Street.

Community and preservation groups — including the "Friends of the Lower West Side" and the "Save Washington Street" group led by St. Francis College student Carl "Antoun" Houck — have continued, especially, to advocate for a hearing on the Downtown Community House, arguing that its history demonstrates the multi-ethnic heritage of the neighborhood, and that its Colonial Revival architecture intentionally links the immigrants to the foundations of the country, and that preserving the three buildings together would tell a coherent story of an overlooked, but important ethnic neighborhood. In addition to national Arab-American organizations, Manhattan Community Board 1 and City Councilperson Margaret Chin have also advocated for the LPC to hold a hearing on the Downtown Community House. According to the Wall Street Journal, however, the LPC argues that "the buildings lack the necessary architectural and historical significance and that better examples of the settlement house movement and tenements exist in other parts of the city." The activists have said they hope that the LPC under the new mayor will be more receptive to preservation in the neighborhood.

== Former landmarks ==
Very rarely, a landmark status granted by the LPC has been revoked. Some have been revoked by vote of the New York City Council or before 1990, the New York City Board of Estimate. Others have been demolished, either through neglect or for development, and revoked by the LPC.

| Landmark name | Image | Date designated | Date removed | Location | Notes |
|---|---|---|---|---|---|
| 71 Pearl Street | | May 17, 1966 | 1968 | Manhattan | Landmark 0041; The building was torn down and its site was later occupied by 85 Broad Street. |
| 135 Bowery | | June 29, 2011 | September 16, 2011 | Manhattan | Landmark 2439; The building was demolished in 2012. |
| Austin, Nichols and Company Warehouse | | September 20, 2005 | November 30, 2005 | Brooklyn | Landmark 2163; Landmark status failed a New York City Council vote. |
| Beth Hamedrash Hagodol | | February 28, 1967 | | Manhattan | Landmark 0637; The building was destroyed by fire in 2017. |
| Cathedral of St. John the Divine | | June 17, 2003 | October 25, 2003 | Manhattan | Landmark 2127; Re-designated 2017 as landmark 2585 |
| Coogan (Racquet Court Club) Building | | October 3, 1989 | October 8, 1989 | Manhattan | Landmark 1709; The building was demolished. |
| Dvorak House, 327 East 17th Street | | February 1991 | June 1991 | Manhattan | Landmark status failed a New York City Council vote.; The building was demolished. |
| First Avenue Estate | | April 24, 1990 | August 16, 1990 | Manhattan | Landmark 1692; Re-designated 2006 as landmark 1692A. |
| Grace Episcopal Memorial Hall | | October 26, 2010 | January 18, 2011 | Queens | Landmark 2394; Landmark status failed a New York City Council vote. |
| Jamaica Savings Bank, 161-02 Jamaica Avenue | | May 5, 1992 | 1992 | Queens | Landmark 1800; Landmark status failed a New York City Council vote.; Re-designated 2008 as landmark 2109 |
| Jamaica Savings Bank, 89-01 Queens Boulevard | | June 28, 2005 | October 20, 2005 | Queens | Landmark 2173; Landmark status failed a New York City Council vote. |
| Jerome Mansion | | November 21, 1965 | June 23, 1966 | Manhattan | Landmark 0015; The mansion was torn down in 1967 and replaced by the New York Merchandise Mart. |
| Lakeman-Cortelyou-Taylor House | | December 13, 2016 | March 2017 | Staten Island | Landmark 2444 |
| New Brighton Village Hall | | 1965 | December 12, 2006 | Staten Island | Landmark 0028; The building was torn down in 2004 due to extreme neglect. |
| Public School 31 | | July 15, 1986 | December 10, 2019 | Bronx | Landmark 1435; The building was demolished in 2014 due to extreme neglect. |
| Samuel H. & Mary T. Booth House | | November 28, 2017 | March 12, 2018 | Bronx | Landmark 2488 |
| Stafford "Osborn" House | | November 28, 2017 | March 12, 2018 | Bronx | Landmark 2479 |
| Steinway Historic District | | November 28, 1974 | January 23, 1975 | Queens | |
| Walker Theatre | | September 11, 1984 | January 24, 1985 | Brooklyn | Interior landmark. Landmark 1291; The interior spaces were divided into a four-screen cinema, then converted to retail. |

== See also ==
- List of New York City Landmarks
- New York State Register of Historic Places
- New York City Office of Administrative Trials and Hearings (OATH), for hearings conducted on summonses for quality of life violations issued by the LPC
