= Merchandise Mart =

Commercial building in Chicago, Illinois

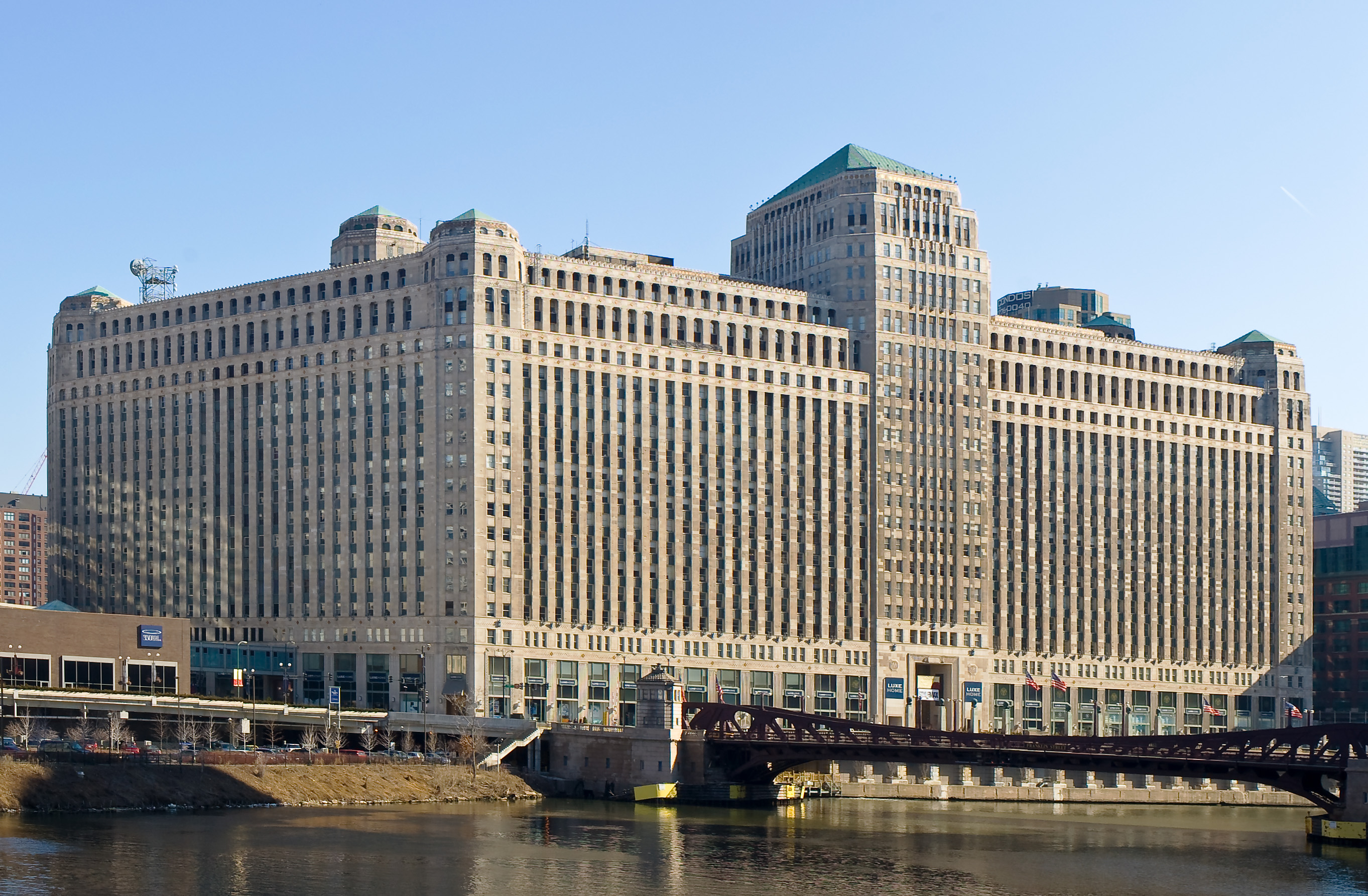

General information
- Type: Mixed
- Architectural style: Art Deco
- Location: 222 Merchandise Mart Plaza; Chicago, Illinois
- Coordinates: 41.8884°N 87.6355°W
- Construction started: August 16, 1928
- Completed: 1930
- Opening: May 5, 1930; 96 years ago
- Owner: Vornado Realty Trust

Height
- Roof: 340 feet (103.6 m)

Technical details
- Floor count: 18 base, 25 tower
- Floor area: 4,000,000 square feet (372,000 m^{2})

Design and construction
- Architect: Graham, Anderson, Probst and White with the firm's Alfred P. Shaw as chief architect
- Main contractor: John W. Griffiths & Sons

Other information
- Public transit: Brown Purple at Merchandise Mart

The Merchandise Mart (or the Merch Mart, or the Mart) is a commercial building in downtown Chicago, Illinois. When it opened in 1930, it was the world's largest building, with 4 million square feet (372,000 m^{2}) of floor space. The Art Deco structure is at the junction of the Chicago River's branches. The building is a leading retailing and wholesale location, hosting 20,000 visitors and tenants daily in the late 2000s.

Built by Marshall Field & Co. and later owned for over half a century by the Kennedy family, the Mart centralizes Chicago's wholesale goods industry by consolidating architectural and interior design vendors and trades under a single roof. It has become home to several other enterprises, including the Shops at the Mart, the Chicago campus of the Illinois Institute of Art, Motorola Mobility, the Grainger Technology Group branch of W.W. Grainger, Conagra Brands, and the Chicago tech startup center 1871. It was sold in January 1998 to Vornado Realty Trust.

The Merchandise Mart is so large that it had its own ZIP Code (60654) until 2008, when the Postal Service assigned the ZIP Code to part of the surrounding area. In 2010, the building opened its Design Center showrooms to the public.

== History ==
=== Construction and context ===
Merchandise Mart under construction, 1929

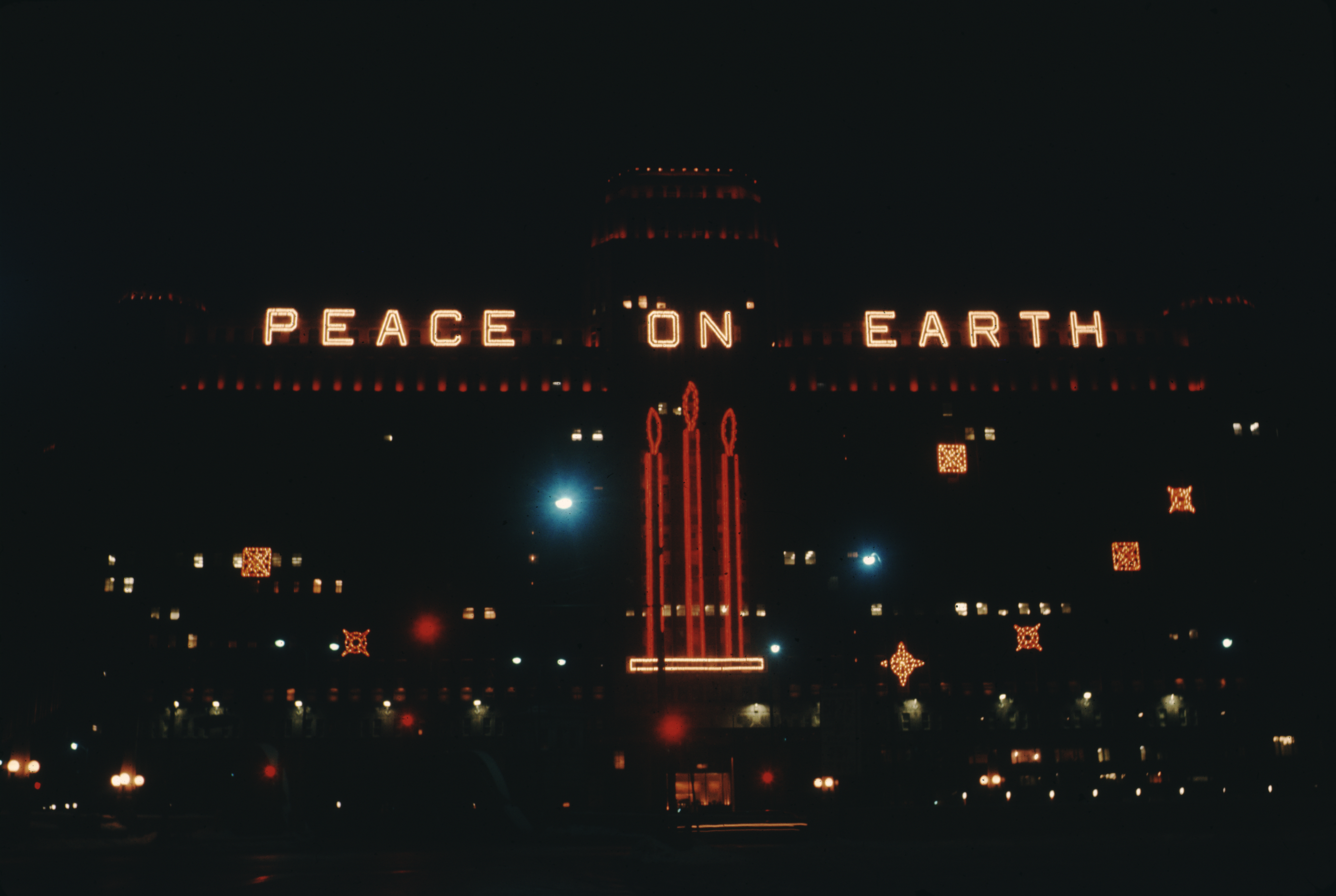
Merchandise Mart in late 1969

In 1926, a westward extension of double-deck Wacker Drive increased development on the south riverbank. In 1927, Marshall Field & Co. announced its plans to build on the north bank opposite Wacker Drive. The site, bordered by Orleans Street, Wells Street, Kinzie Street, and the Chicago River, was formerly a Native American trading post and the site of Chicago and North Western Railway's former Wells Street Station, abandoned in 1911 in favor of the Chicago and North Western Passenger Terminal. With the railroad's air rights, the site was large enough to accommodate "the largest building in the world". Removing the train yard supported the Chicago Plan Commission's desire to develop and beautify the riverfront.

James Simpson, president of Marshall Field & Co. from 1923 to 1930 and chairman of the Chicago Plan Commission from 1926 to 1935, turned the first shovels of dirt at groundbreaking on August 16, 1928, along with architect Ernest Graham. General contractor John W. Griffiths & Sons brought building construction into the Machine Age through the use of techniques "ordinarily used in the construction of big dams."

Cement arriving by boat was lifted by compressed air to bins 75 feet (20 m) above the ground, with gravel and sand delivered by railroad cars to conveyor belts and transfer elevators. Giant mixers provided wet concrete to skip hoists in vertical towers that were extended as the building rose. Continuously employing 2,500 men and as many as 5,700 men altogether, the construction project lasted a year and a half into the early months of the Great Depression.

With a foundation footprint of nearly two square city blocks, the building required 29 million bricks, 40 miles (64 km) of plumbing, 380 miles (610 km) of wiring, nearly 4 million cubic yards (3,100,000 m^{3}) of concrete, 200,000 cubic feet (5,700 m^{3}) of stone, and 4,000 windows. Bethlehem Steel fabricated much of the 60,000 tons of steel. An estimated 7.5 miles (10 km) of corridors and over 30 elevators were included in the construction. The total cost was estimated at $26 million (equivalent to $501,000,000 in 2025).

=== Ownership ===
The Merchandise Mart opened on May 5, 1930, just east of Chicago's original trading post, Wolf Point.

The building realized Marshall Field’s dream of a single wholesale center for the nation and consolidated 13 different warehouses. It was purchased in 1945 or 1946 by the Kennedy family through Merchandise Mart Properties, Inc. (MMPI), and managed by Sargent Shriver. Kennedy's purchase price was reported to be either $12.5 or $13 million, and it is said that his initial capital was $1 million, though records say his original mortgage was $12.5 million, roughly half of what it had cost to construct the complex.

E. Stanley Klein, a good friend of Marshall Field and Joseph Kennedy, brokered the building's sale. At the time Klein was a partner of Field and together they started Fieldcrest Mills. Klein maintained that Kennedy's bargain price was predicated on an oral agreement between Field and Kennedy that after the sale the building would be donated to the University of Chicago and that Kennedy would take the tax deduction. No documentary evidence of this agreement exists.

The building revenues became a principal source of Kennedy family wealth, often used for political campaign funding.

In 1998 the Kennedys sold the property to Vornado Realty Trust as part of a larger $625 million ($1.2 billion in 2025 dollars) transaction. When it was sold, the Merchandise Mart was also the Kennedy family's last remaining operating business. That year, Vornado acquired MMPI for $450 million cash and a $100 million-plus stake in Vornado. As of 2007, the building was valued at $917 million.

=== Expansions and renovations ===
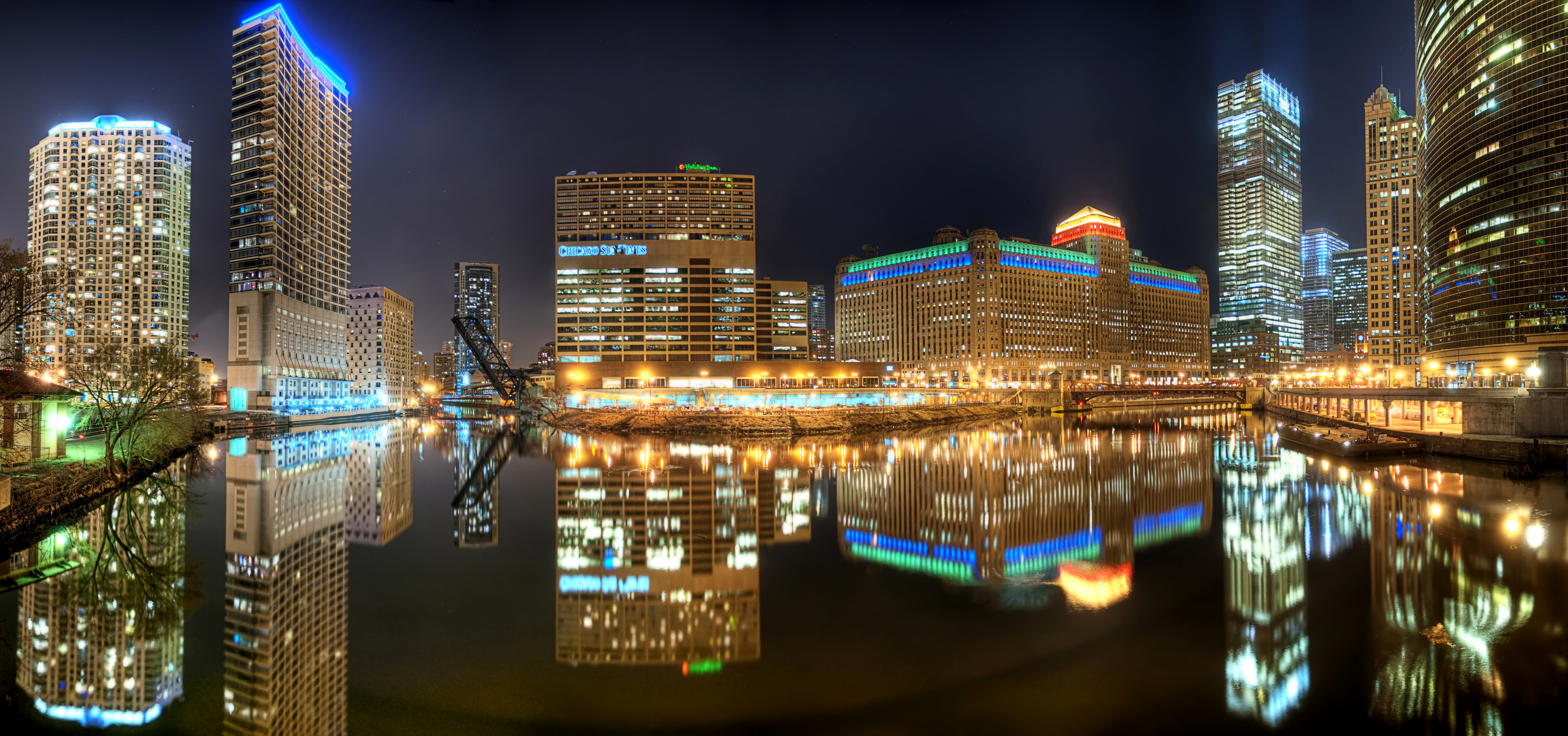
A night view of the building's surroundings along the Chicago River: Among the buildings and structures shown are (left to right) Left Bank at K Station (300 North Canal), 333 North Canal, Kinzie Street railroad bridge, 350 West Mart Center, Merchandise Mart, 300 North LaSalle, Franklin Street Bridge and part of 333 Wacker Drive.

The Merchandise Mart was modernized in the late 1950s and 1960s. In 1961 the Indian chiefs were removed and replaced with concrete plates, of minimal note to onlookers as skyscrapers did not rise on the north side of the river as predicted. In 2014, some of the carvings were found in a suburban backyard and auctioned. In 1962, an entrance canopy was constructed over the south for vehicle use.

In 1977, Skidmore, Owings & Merrill designed the Chicago Apparel Center, on the west side of Orleans Street, which increased the Merchandise Mart’s total floor space to 6.2 million square feet (580,000 m^{2}). Plazas, esplanades, and overlooks employed the waterfront location for pedestrian use. In 1988, Helmut Jahn designed an enclosed pedestrian walking bridge over Orleans Street connecting the Mart and the Apparel Center.

After a 10-year, $100 million modernization in the late 1980s that included public utility upgrades, Beyer Blinder Belle's commission in 1989 was to create additional perimeter entrances and restore the display windows, main entrance, and lobby. On the south facade, the drive-through canopy was removed and two smaller doorways beside the main entrance added. Display windows, painted over during the earlier modernization campaign, were restored with clear glass to showcase merchants' wares.

New main and corner entrances were added to the rear facade, and the loading dock that occupied the north portion of the first floor of the river level was removed in order to use the bottom deck of North Bank Drive. Improvements to the lobby included restoration of the original glass curtain wall over the entrance, shop fronts, and reception desk using terrazzo floors and wall sconces influenced by the original design. The project was completed in 1991.

In 2007, the building received LEED for Existing Buildings Silver recognition.

== Building ==
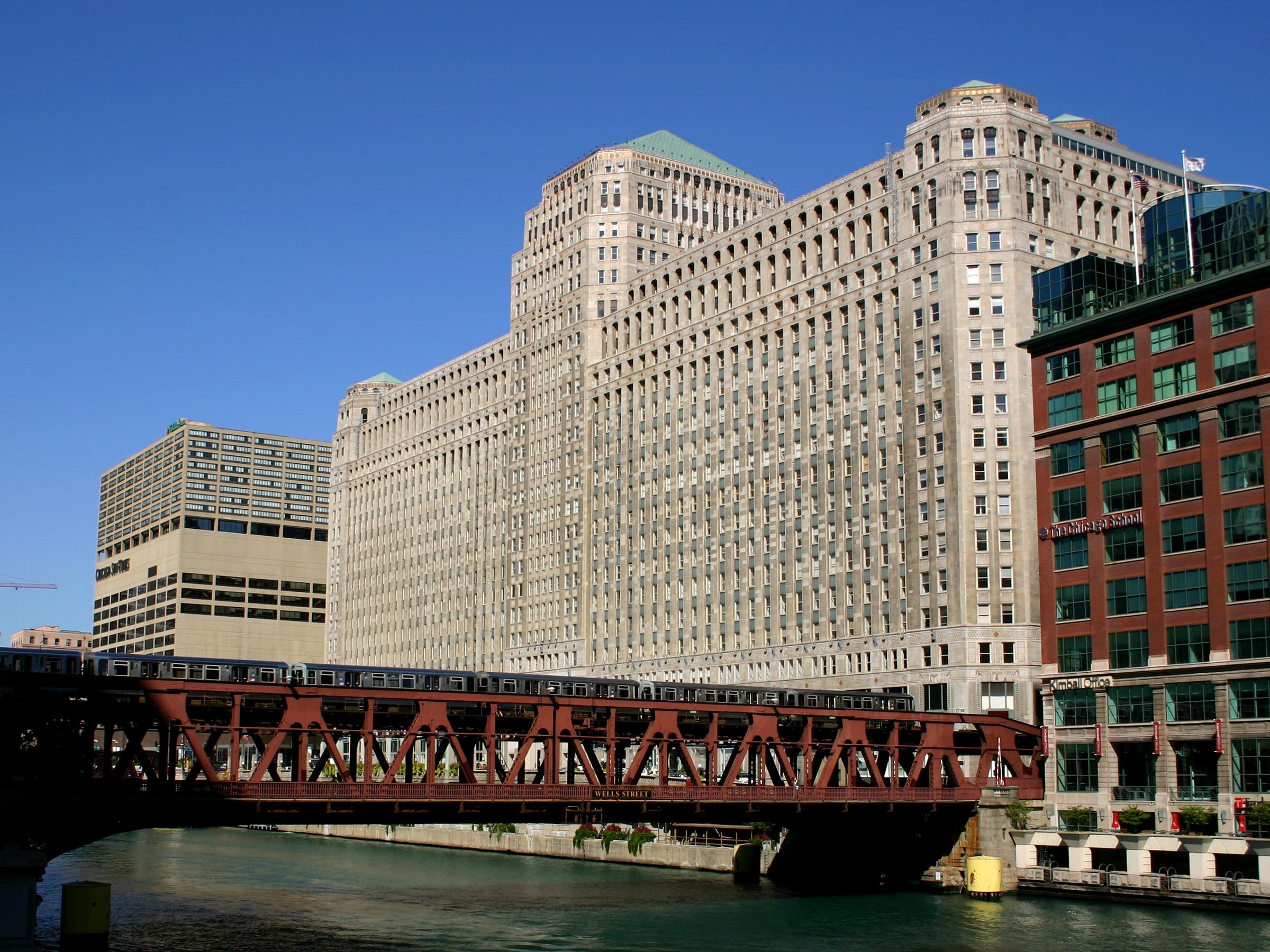
From the Chicago River, looking west

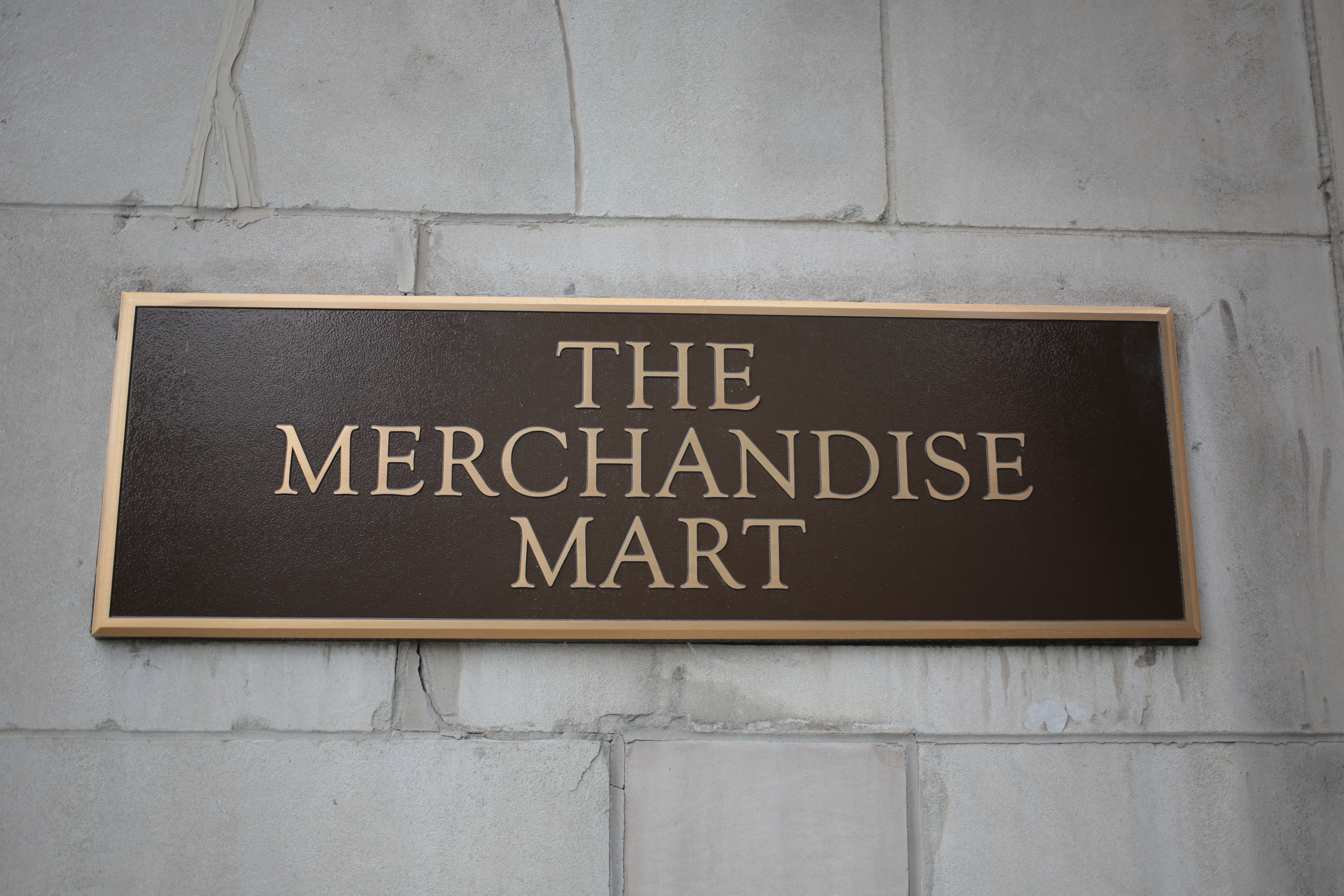
The sign on the building

The Merchandise Mart was designed by the Chicago architectural firm of Graham, Anderson, Probst and White to be a "city within a city". Second only to Holabird & Root in Chicago art deco architecture, the firm had a long-standing relationship with the Field family. Started in 1928, completed in 1931, and built in the same art deco style as the Chicago Board of Trade Building, its cost was reported as both $32 million and $38 million. The building was the largest in the world in terms of floorspace, but was surpassed by the Pentagon in 1943, and now stands forty-fourth on the list of largest buildings in the world. Once the largest commercial space in the world, New Century Global Center in China is now recognized by Guinness World Records as holding the record.

=== Architecture ===
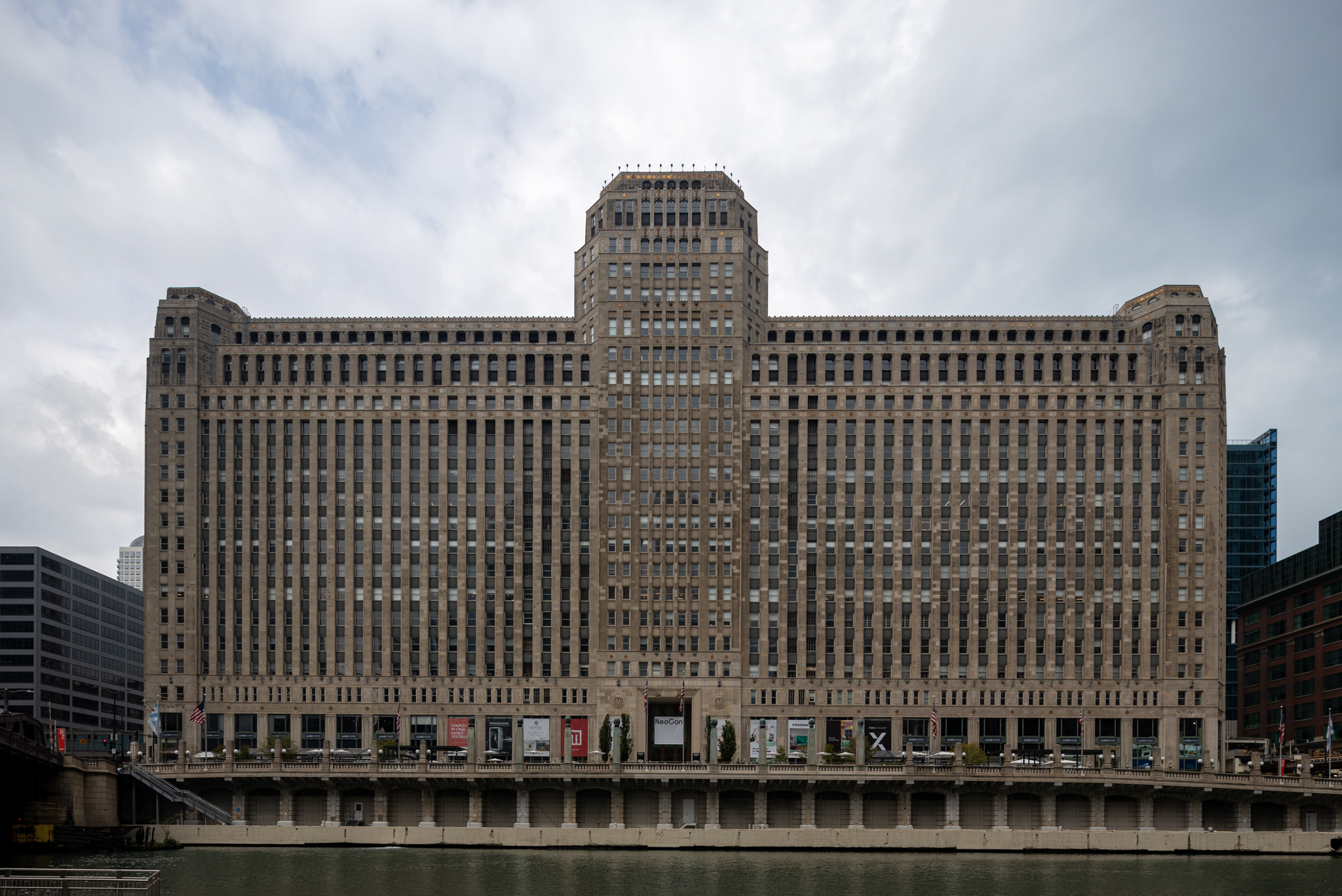
Merchandise Mart, designed by Alfred P. Shaw, built in 1930.

Designer Alfred Shaw integrated art deco stylings with influences from three building types—the warehouse, the department store and the skyscraper. A warehouse block stands as the 18-story bulk of the building. Ribbon piers define the windows, and the building's chamfered corners, minimal setbacks, and corner pavilions disguise the edges of the mass and visually reduce bulk.

The south corner pavilions are of greater height than the north corner pavilions. The building is open at the pedestrian level with bronzed framed display windows, typical of a department store, on the south, west and east boundaries. The 25-story central tower ascends with a peak in the form of a skyscraper, and rests in the southern half of the building. Deeply recessed portals occur between raised panels, and are adorned with medallions featuring the interlocked initials of the Merchandise Mart. The same logo occurs throughout the building. Fifty-six American Indian chiefs circled the tower's crown, a reference to the site's history and Chicago's early trade activities. Three and a half feet wide by seven feet tall, the terra cotta figures were barely visible from the street, meant to be viewed from the upper floors of the skyscrapers planned to rise along the riverbank.

The lobby of The Merchandise Mart is defined by eight square marble piers, with storefronts in side aisles framed in embossed bronze trim. The green and orange terrazzo floor was conceived as a carpet: a pattern of squares and stripes bordered by overscaled chevrons inlaid with The Mart's initials. The chevron theme is continued in the column sconces lighting an ornamented cornice overhead.

Referred to as "business boulevards", two wide 650 feet (200 m) long corridors with terrazzo floors in the upper levels featured six and one-half miles of display windows. Building regulations specified identical entrances along corridors but tenants could personalize the individual floor space. Excepting the corridors, elevator halls, and exhibition space on the fourth floor, the 5 acres (20,000 m^{2}) of each upper floor was "raw space" with concrete floors.

=== Artwork ===
Jules Guerin's frieze of 17 murals is the primary feature of the lobby and graphically illustrate commerce throughout the world, including the countries of origin for items sold in the building. The murals depict the industries and products, the primary mode of transportation and the architecture of 14 countries. Drawing on years as a stage set designer, Guerin executed the murals in red with gold leaf using techniques producing distinct image layers in successive planes. In a panel representing Italy, Venetian glassware appears in the foreground with fishing boats moored on the Grand Canal and the facade of the Palazzo Ducale rises above the towers of the Piazza San Marco.

"To immortalize outstanding American merchants", Joseph Kennedy in 1953 commissioned eight bronze busts, four times life size, which would come to be known as the Merchandise Mart Hall of Fame:

- retail magnates Frank Winfield Woolworth, Marshall Field and Aaron Montgomery Ward
- Julius Rosenwald and Robert Elkington Wood of Sears, Roebuck and Company fame
- advertiser John Wanamaker, merchandiser Edward Albert Filene, and A&P grocery chain founder George Huntington Hartford.

All of the busts rest on white pedestals lining the Chicago River and face north toward the gold front door of the building.

==== "Art on theMART" ====
"Art on theMART" is a digital art display begun in 2018. It provides a 2.5 acre "canvas" (2 football fields) for digital artwork projected on the Chicago River facing facade of the Merchandise Mart. It featured works from the nonprofit organization Arts of Life. The project is intended to be the largest digital art projection in the world and is scheduled to occur over thirty years with annual showings initially between March and December. In 2019 it was expanded from five nights a week to every night. Displays begin 15 minutes after sunset and loop for two hours. Obscura Digital studio initially installed 34 projectors to allow the rotating roster of artists to display their work.

=== Surroundings ===
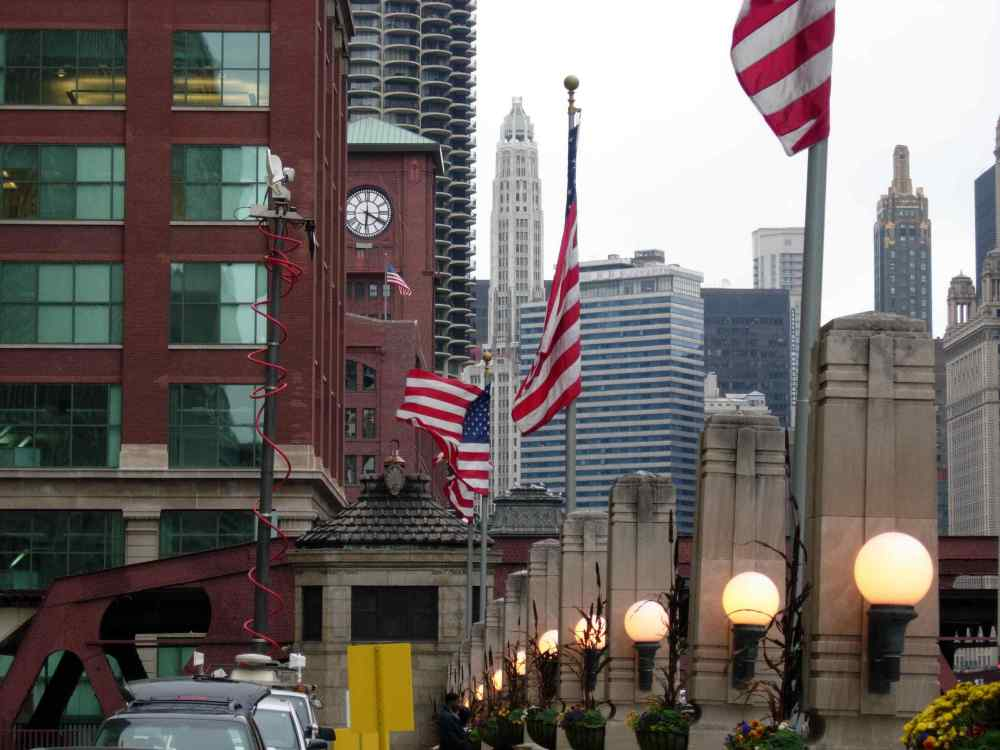
Plaza in front of the Merchandise Mart

Dominating the skyline in the south end of the Near North Side, the Mart lies just south of the gallery district on the southern terminus of Franklin Street. Eateries and nightclubs abound on Hubbard Street one block to the north. The Kinzie Chophouse, popular with politicians and celebrities, stands on the northwest corner of Wells and Kinzie, across from the Merchandise Mart. The Chicago Varnish Company Building, listed on the National Register of Historic Places and now housing Harry Caray's restaurant, is located east on Kinzie Street. Across the street to the east is 325 N. Wells Street, home to The Chicago School of Professional Psychology and DIRTT Environmental Solutions.

The Mart's footprint is a right trapezoid in shape, having been constructed after the bascule bridges over the Chicago River were completed. The control house for the double decked Wells Street Bridge stands between the lower level and the southeast corner of the building. The Franklin Street Bridge stands at the southwest corner of the building, at the junction of Orleans Street and Franklin Street. The building slants at the same angle as Franklin Street, from southeast to northwest along Orleans Street.

=== Exterior lighting ===
A heritage of lighting the structure finds the central and corner towers, along with the columns between each window on the setbacks, bathed nightly in an upwardly focused white light. Tradition dictates annual changes to green in mid-March for St. Patrick's Day and orange during the fall months around Halloween and Thanksgiving. Prominent events have found the behemoth lit in pink for Cancer Awareness Month. To note the 2006 Chicago Bears season, highlighted by reaching Super Bowl XLI, the building was lit with team colors, orange floodlights for the setbacks and blue floodlights for the towers.

Red and green lights are used during the Christmas season. During the Art Chicago 2008 the American artist Jenny Holzer illuminated the facade of the building with a poem by the Polish winner of the Nobel Prize in Literature Wisława Szymborska. In 2018, a large projection screen began displaying images and videos across the structure's riverfront side.

Nighttime lighting on the Mart typically matches the colors of antenna lighting on the Sears Tower and John Hancock Center, as well as the colors used on the top floors of the Aon Center.

=== Green building practices ===
Under Chris Kennedy's leadership of the Mart, it was the largest building in the world to be awarded LEED (Leadership in Energy and Environmental Design) Certification in 2007 from the United States Green Building Council (USGBC). The Mart has long been implementing sustainable practices. The Mart Center began operating a thermal storage facility in 1986, capable of building 2,000,000 pounds (910,000 kg) of ice per night, cooling 71 buildings in the surrounding neighborhood, and saving $200,000 in electricity costs in the first year.

In 1990, the Mart Center began using Green Seal-approved green cleaning products and the next year implemented a recycling program, which today includes all forms of paper products, glass, light bulbs, batteries, aluminum and construction materials. In 1996, the Mart Center became one of the first major property owners in downtown Chicago to enter into an agreement with the district cooling system now known as Thermal Chicago, thus contributing to the national effort to reduce the discharge of ozone-damaging CFCs.

In 2006, MMPI joined Clean Air Counts, a voluntary initiative to reduce smog forming pollutants and energy consumption in the Chicago area. Part of the campaign strategies included utilizing only low VOC cleaning products, paints and building materials, as well as energy efficient lighting and alternative workplace transportation options. To date, the Mart Center has reduced pollution by 264,018 pounds (119,757 kg), the largest reduction by a commercial building.

In 2006, the Mart Center recycling program saved over 13,000 trees and recycled nearly 11 million pounds of waste, while water conservation efforts saved 5.5 million US gallons (21,000 m^{3}) of water. More than eight percent of the estimated 10,000 people working at the Mart walk, bike or take public transportation; to encourage greener methods of transportation, the Mart expanded bicycle storage capacity to more than 200. In 2009, MMPI converted all stationery to a one hundred percent post-consumer recycled product.

The Mart has nine LEED-certified showrooms, with five others on their way to LEED certification.

== Uses ==
=== Commerce ===
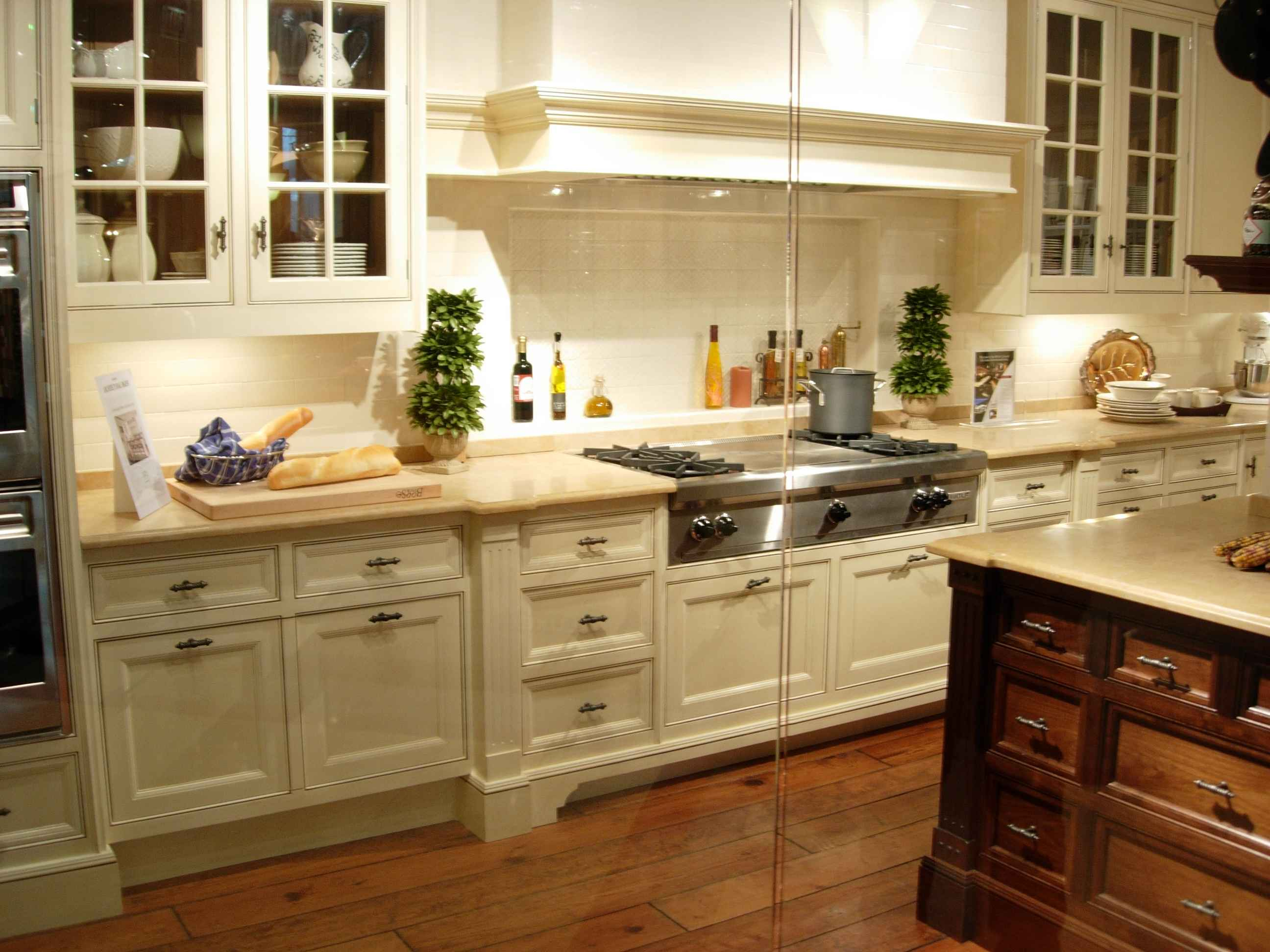
A display inside the Merchandise Mart

Wholesale showrooms occupied 50% of the usable floor space as of 2007. In 1983, the Sultan of Brunei once spent $1.6 million at the Mart to furnish his entire palace, claiming the location was the only place where the task could be completed in one week. Select showrooms are open only to wholesalers, with others accessible to the general public. Unlike stores with traditional shelf and rack displays, entire usable rooms are created, providing consumers an opportunity to compare form and function between applications and manufacturers.

A portion of the stores offer items for purchase singly or as a collection, while others offer design services, preservation, renovation, or installation. In addition to being a resource for architects and decorators, the Mart also has featured award-winning designs as selected by the American Institute of Architects. Catering to suppliers, on-site firms specialize in providing professional services for market research projects.

In 1931, Marshall Field and Company lost $5 million, followed by $8 million in 1932. The wholesale division was greatly reduced and Field's reduced its space in the Mart from four floors to one and half. The Mart continued to display the latest trends in home furnishings within the showrooms and trade shows. The company recovered late in the decade, but did not return to all previously occupied space.

In 1942, L. L. Skaggs formed a partnership with three other men and named the partnership the Owners Service Company, hence Osco. The headquarters moved from Waterloo, Iowa, to the Merchandise Mart.

A retail shopping area, named The Shops at the Mart, opened in 1991 and includes apparel shops, beauty services, bookstores and newsstands, financial services, telecommunication services, travel services, specialty food and wine stores, photo services, a dry cleaner, shoe shine stand, and a food court. A U.S. Post Office is located on the first floor and a FedEx location is on the second floor.

The Apparel Center houses the 521-room Holiday Inn Chicago Mart Plaza River North hotel, the offices of the Chicago Sun-Times and the Chicago campus of the Illinois Institute of Art – Chicago, as well as the Chicago office of the Ogilvy & Mather advertising agency. GoHealth occupies 93,000 square feet (8,600 m^{2}) on the 5th floor of Merchandise Mart, the Potbelly Sandwich Works' corporate offices are located in the tower. Motorola Mobility moved its headquarters to the Merchandise Mart in 2014.

=== Trade fairs ===
Since 1969, the Merchandise Mart has been home to the annual National Exposition of Contract Furnishings, known as NeoCon. With over 1,000 exhibitors of contract and commercial furnishings, and 50,000 attendees, it is the largest trade show of its kind in North America.

Since 2006 the Merchandise Mart has hosted the Art Chicago international art fair.

Merchandise Mart hosts the Chicago Collective menswear trade show in February and August.

=== Mass media ===
==== Radio ====
Before the location even opened, NBC announced plans to build studios in the Mart. When opened on October 20, 1930, the nineteenth-floor location covered 65,000 square feet (6,000 m^{2}) and supported a variety of live broadcasts including those requiring orchestras. WENR and WMAQ broadcast from the location. Expanded in 1935, with office space in the previously unoccupied tower, the additional 11,500 square feet (1,070 m^{2}) provided room for an organ chamber, two echo rooms, and a total of 11 studios. A staff of more than 300 produced up to 1,700 programs each month, including Amos 'n' Andy.

Hugh Downs contributed to the Burr Tillstrom children's show Kukla, Fran and Ollie from the NBC studios after the network picked up the program from WBKB. The Captain Midnight radio program was broadcast from the Mart from 1942 until 1945.

WMAQ and WMAQ-TV moved to the NBC Tower in 1989, though NBC sold WMAQ radio to Westinghouse Broadcasting two years earlier. WMAQ's former sister FM station, now WKQX, stayed at the Merchandise Mart until 2016, when it moved to NBC Tower itself. The nineteenth floor is currently vacant.

==== Television ====
On January 7, 1949, NBC station WNBQ commercially debuted its television broadcast schedule on channel 5, with a minimum of two hours of programming per day. April 15, 1956, is remembered as "C-Day" at WMAQ-TV, and was described by Broadcasting-Telecasting magazine as "a daring breakthrough the black-and-white curtain." With Mayor Richard J. Daley looking on, NBC President David Sarnoff operated the controls as Channel 5 became the world's first all-color TV station as "Wide, Wide World" was broadcast to 110 NBC-TV affiliated stations across the country. The color conversion project cost more than $1.25 million with advertising costing $175,000. On "C-Day", three skywriting planes flew over the city, trailing streams of red, green and blue smoke.

WMAQ-TV first installed color equipment in late 1953, with the Tournament of Roses Parade of 1954 as the first major broadcast. Introduced in March 1955, the first local color program was John Ott's "How Does Your Garden Grow?", featuring the use of time-lapse color film.

Although WMAQ-TV has since moved to NBC Tower about a mile away, and for the most part the 19th floor of the Mart has been turned into office space, one former tenant (Bankers Life and Trust Company) maintained a remnant of the original studios as their video and multimedia department.

Local regional sports network NBC Sports Chicago has their control room, and broadcasts their live studio programming from the Apparel Center expansion; the studios had been home to previous RSNs FSN Chicago and SportsChannel Chicago.

== Chicago 'L' ==
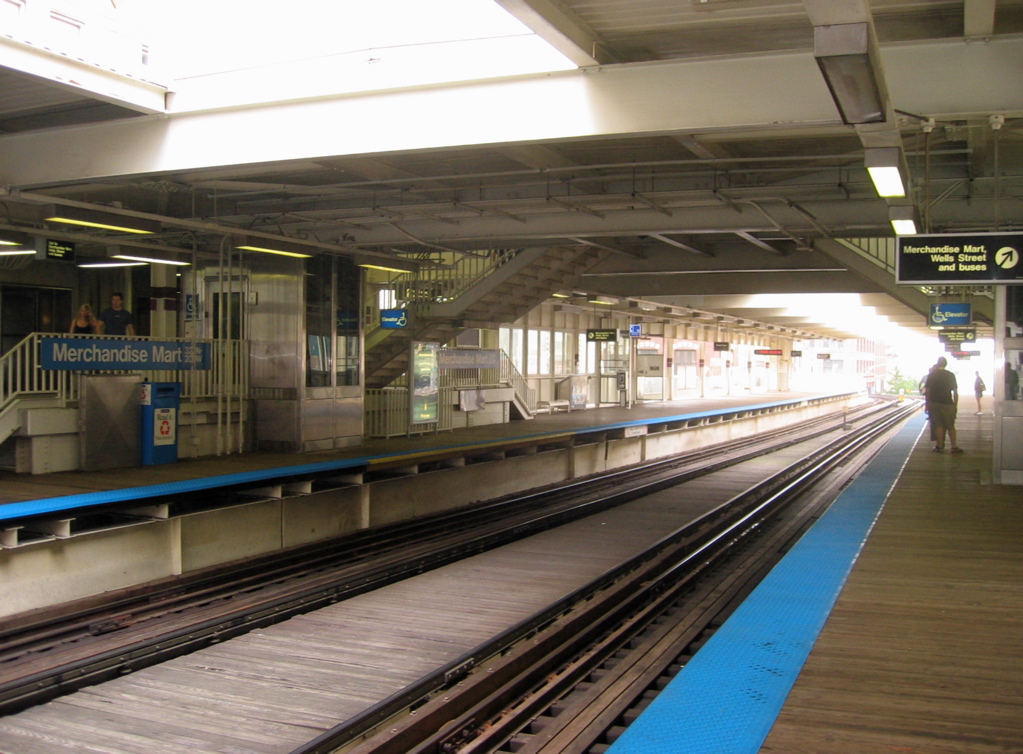
The Merchandise Mart 'L' station

Built in under four months and opened on December 5, 1930, the Merchandise Mart elevated train station served the Main Line of the North Side Division. The station is now noted for being one of two commercial locations to have its own station on the Chicago Transit Authority's (CTA) 'L' system. The station is now served by the Brown and Purple Lines.

The station complies with the Americans with Disabilities Act of 1990. The turnstiles are located within the building on the second floor, while the platforms are connected to the east side of the building. The northbound platform is accessed by an overhead bridge or elevator. It was rebuilt in 1988, prior to the Wells Street Bridge reconstruction in 1989.

The Merchandise Mart housed the CTA's headquarters on the 7th floor from 1952 to 2004.

== Cultural involvement ==
- Owing to the expanding postwar economy and family, the owners began offering tours in 1948. Architecture and design interest groups continue to offer scheduled tours.
- The Mart hosts the annual Art Chicago activities.
- Chicago Marathon routes have taken runners past the structure, typically on Wells Street.

=== In popular culture ===
- The 1948 film Call Northside 777 was made in Illinois and the Mart is seen from newspaper offices on Wacker Drive.
- The lobby appeared in the movie The Hudsucker Proxy as the interior of the Hudsucker Company headquarters.
- In 1956, the eight-minute short subject film The Merchandise Mart used the Mart's name and covered in detail the building's interior and operations.
- When his late-night NBC talk show was performed in Chicago during the first week of May 1989, David Letterman called the Merchandise Mart Hall of Fame "the Pez Hall of Fame" because the combination of busts atop the tall vertical pedestals resembled the candy's dispensers.
- In the 1993 film The Fugitive, U.S. Marshals pinpoint the location of Dr. Richard Kimble when they hear a CTA train conductor announce, "Next stop, Merchandise Mart" in the background of a recorded phone call.
- In the 2012 novel Insurgent by Veronica Roth, the Mart was depicted as the headquarters of the Candor faction, where it is named the ‘Merciless Mart’ due to Candor’s proclivity for interrogation.

== See also ==
- Art Deco
- Chicago architecture
- Fulton House, Chicago
- Interior design
- List of largest buildings in the world
- New York Merchandise Mart
