= New York Fashion Week =

Fashion event in New York

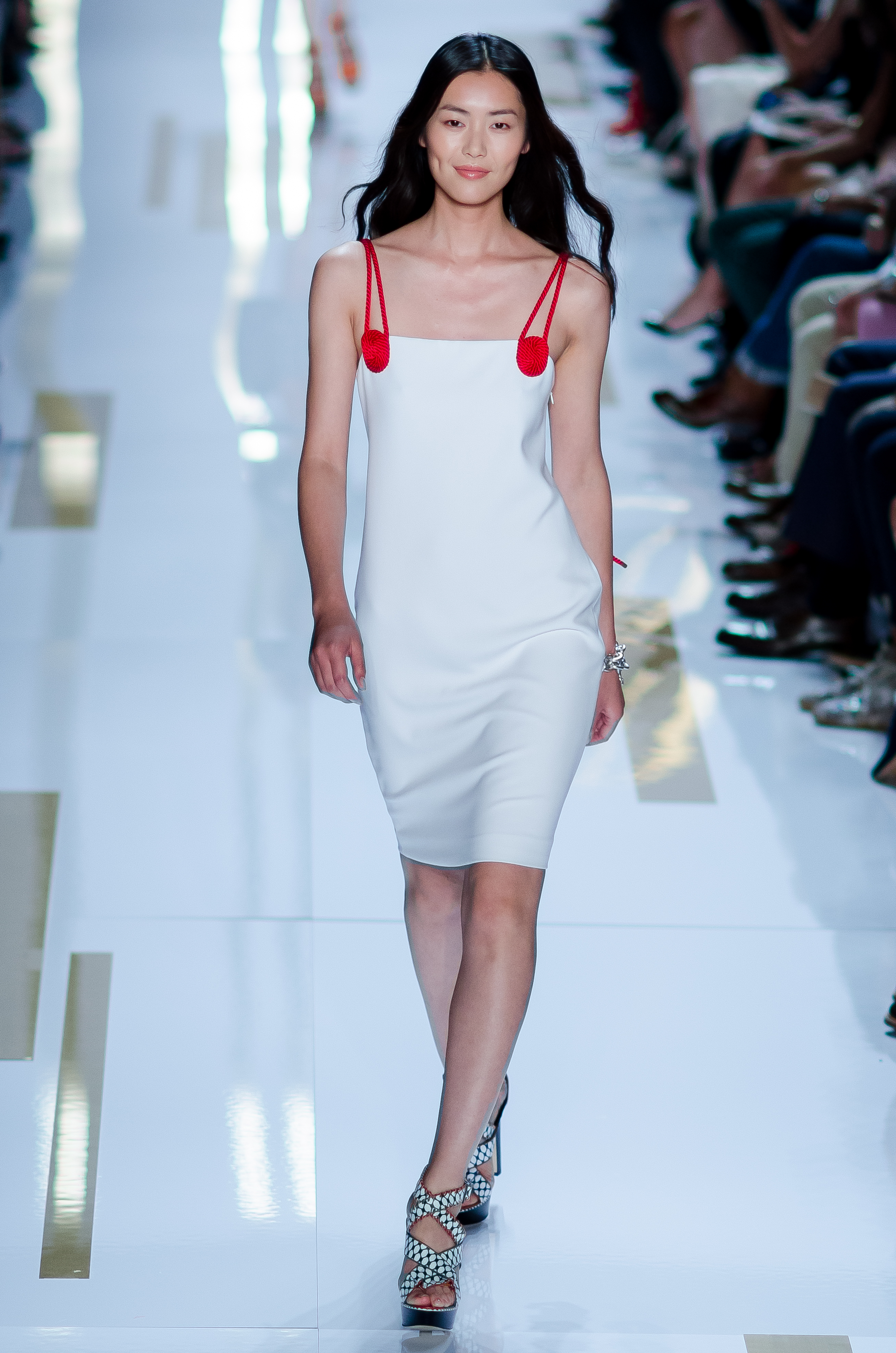
- Model Liu Wen walks the runway modeling fashion by designer Diane von Fürstenberg at New York Fashion Week in 2013.
- Frequency: Semi-annually
- Locations: Manhattan, New York City (primarily at Skylight Clarkson Square and Industria)
- Country: United States
- Inaugurated: 1943
- Founder: Eleanor Lambert

New York Fashion Week (NYFW), held in February and September of each year, is a semi-annual series of events in Manhattan typically spanning seven to nine days when international fashion collections are shown to buyers, the press, and the general public. It is one of four major fashion weeks in the world, collectively known as the "Big Four", along with those in Paris, London, and Milan.

The Council of Fashion Designers of America (CFDA) created the modern notion of a centralized "New York Fashion Week" in 1993. NYFW is based on a much older series of events called "Press Week," founded in 1943.

On a global scale, most business and sales-oriented shows and some couture shows take place in New York City. Recent coverage has highlighted a growing focus on emerging designers at New York Fashion Week, with platforms such as RAISEFashion and an expanded CFDA calendar helping to spotlight rising talent and new creative voices.

A centralized calendar of citywide events (including those affiliated with WME/IMG) is kept by the CFDA, and was acquired from calendar founder Ruth Finley. The annual economic impact of New York Fashion Week upon New York City was estimated at US$887 million in 2016.

== History ==
=== Origins ===
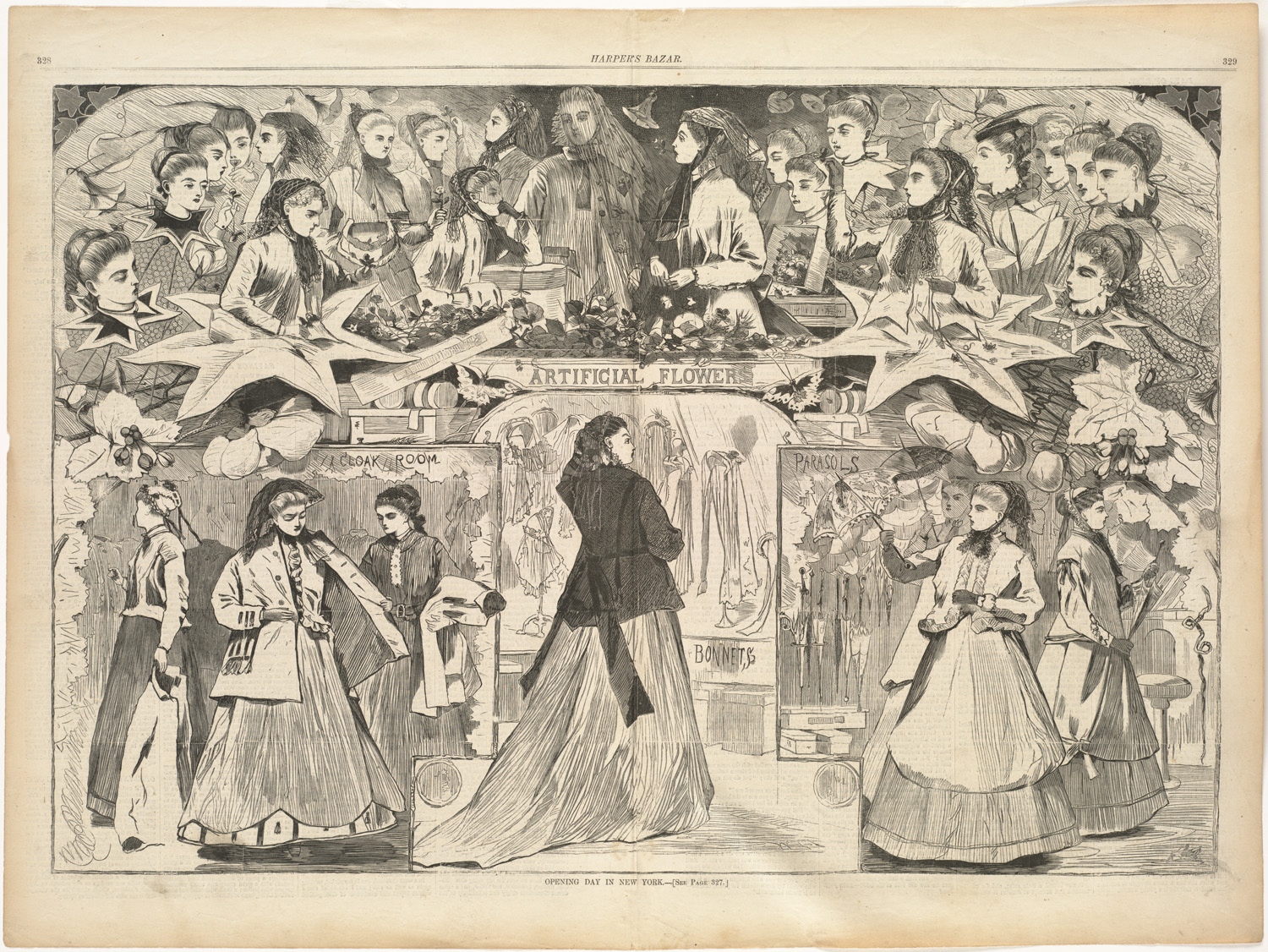
Opening Day for a fashion show in New York, seen in Harper's Bazaar in 1868.

The first New York Fashion Week was created in 1943 by Eleanor Lambert, press director of the American fashion industry's first promotional organization, the New York Dress Institute.

The event, the world's first organized fashion week, was called "Press Week", and was created to attract attention away from French fashion during World War II, when fashion industry insiders were unable to travel to Paris to see French fashion shows. It was also meant to showcase American designers for fashion journalists, who had neglected U.S. fashion innovations.

Press Week in New York was a success, and fashion magazines like Vogue, which were normally filled with French designs, increasingly featured American fashion.

By the mid-1950s, the event was known as "Press Week of New York". Spring 1951 (held February 1951) was the 16th Annual Press Week of New York.

=== Consolidation as "7th on Sixth" ===
In 1993, the Council of Fashion Designers of America, CFDA, led by president Stan Herman and executive director Fern Mallis, consolidated the citywide events known as "New York Fashion Week" by staging them in a cluster of white tents in Bryant Park. The event was branded with the trademark "7th on Sixth".

=== 21st century ===
Internationally, most business and sales-oriented shows and some couture shows have taken place in New York City since 2010. The emphasis, however, has perennially been financial. New York's LGBT fashion design community contributes very significantly to promulgating fashion trends, and drag celebrities have developed a profound influence upon New York Fashion Week.

==== 2000s ====
In 2001, "7th on Sixth" was sold to IMG. The exhibition was cancelled in September 2001 in light of the September 11 attacks. The 9/11 terrorist attacks occurred on what should have been the fourth day of NYFW. The exhibition they were having to feature a maternity designer was cancelled as well as all remaining events.

In 2007, Mercedes-Benz became title sponsor of the IMG-produced events, adding New York to its roster of international "Mercedes-Benz fashion weeks", and dubbing it "MB Fashion Week New York".

==== 2010s ====
In 2010, IMG/Mercedes-Benz Fashion Week New York left the Bryant Park tents, relocating to the Lincoln Center for the Performing Arts. In September 2011, New York designers began live-streaming runway shows, in order to reach a greater audience. The following London, who began in February 2010. Streams were originally offered on YouTube, and later on other sites. IMG and its New York Fashion Week events were sold to William Morris Endeavor (WME) and Silver Lake Partners for $2.3 billion in 2013.

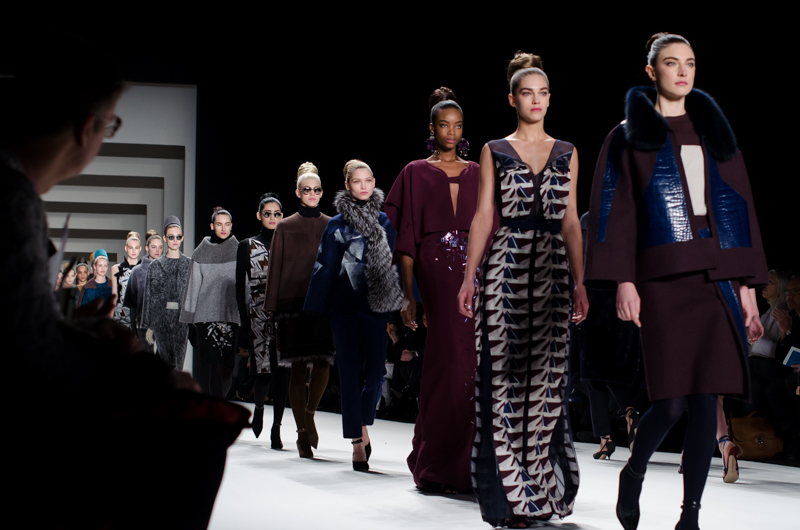
Haute couture fashion models walk the runway during New York Fashion Week.

In 2014, New York State passed legislation designating models under the age of 18 as child performers, restricting the hours they can perform and requiring additional documentation.

In February 2014, Dr. Danielle Sheypuk became the first wheelchair-using model to appear in a show for New York Fashion Week when she modelled for designer Carrie Hammer. Karen Crespo became the first quadruple-amputee to walk at New York Fashion Week in September 2014, also for Carrie Hammer.

The CFDA acquired FashionCalendar.com from Ruth Finley in 2014. The company had managed it (originally in the paper, then in digital format) for more than 60 years.

On December 12, 2014, a New York state court approved a settlement in a lawsuit by community activists over whether allowing the Mercedes-Benz Fashion Week tents in Damrosch Park was a violation of the public trust doctrine. In accordance with the settlement, the City of New York, the New York City Department of Parks and Recreation, and Lincoln Center for the Performing Arts agreed not to renew their contract with IMG. As a result, the February 2015 Mercedes-Benz Fashion Week was the last one staged in Damrosch Park.

In January 2015, Mercedes-Benz announced its departure as title sponsor from WME/IMG's events. Producer Kanye West announced he would gladly take over sponsorship of the event. That March, WME/IMG announced that it had acquired MADE Fashion Week, which takes place during WME/IMG's events.

Actress Jamie Brewer became the first woman with Down syndrome to walk the red carpet at New York Fashion Week in February 2015, which she did for designer Carrie Hammer. That September, IMG's events were moved from Lincoln Center to Spring Studios.

In December 2015, the CFDA announced that it had hired the Boston Consulting Group to study revising the format of New York Fashion Week to adapt to changes brought about by social media. One option being explored is to bifurcate the event, with private showroom appointments of next season's designs for buyers and public fashion shows displaying in-season merchandise for consumers.

The 2016 season ended with a number of designers either experimenting with, or planning to adopt, a "see now, buy now model", with items available from the runway immediately after (or even during) the show, rather than six months later. The charge was led by brands such as Burberry, although experiments in the format can be traced back to earlier shows by designers such as Diane von Furstenberg. The first New York Fashion Week dedicated menswear shows, called "New York Fashion Week: Men's", were produced.

==== 2020s ====
In December 2025, as a result of the protest actions of the Coalition to Abolish the Fur Trade, CFDA announced it will no longer show animal fur at any official NYFW Schedule events, beginning September 2026.

For NYFW 2026, Google's Gemini partnered with fashion brand L'Agence to use the tech company's virtual try-on technology.

== Current location ==
The primary location for New York Fashion Week is Spring Studios at 50 Varick Street in Lower Manhattan. Locations have included a waterfront carnival, converted railway terminals and a former post office.

== Attendance ==
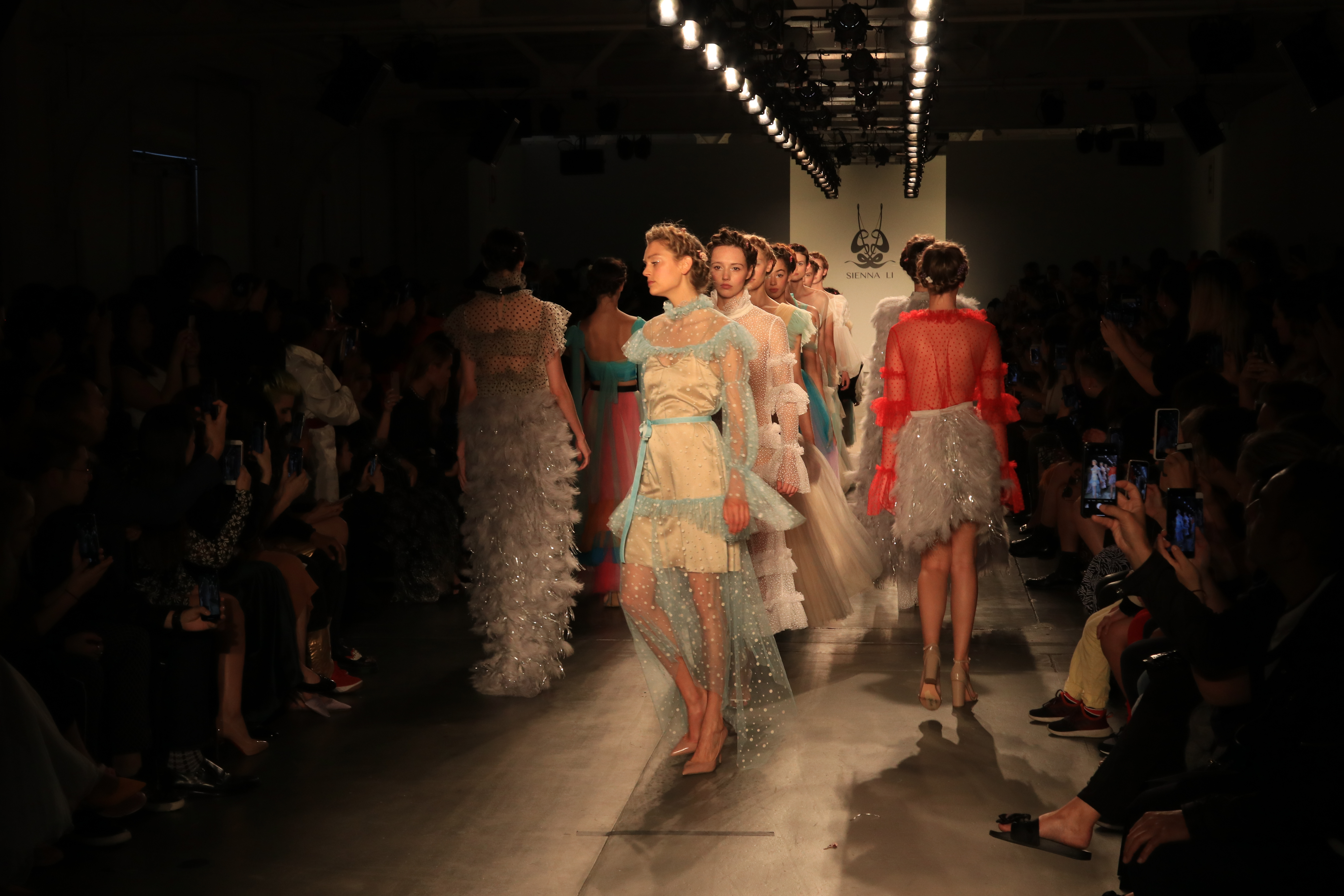

Admission to shows at New York Fashion Week is typically in the form of accreditation, with specific events by invitation only. Most of the time attendees are other designers, celebrities, and social media influencers.

== Trademark ==
The Council of Fashion Designers of America (CFDA) claims to run the "official" New York Fashion Week calendar, as further purported by publications such as Women's Wear Daily. In spite of this, it has been pointed out in publications such as The Fashion Law that CFDA has "little, in any, legal rights in the NYFW name". Therefore, trademark rights remain unclear, at best.

In 2013, Fashion Week Inc., founded by business executive Trisha Paravas, registered the trademarks "New York Fashion Week", "NYFW" and "NYFW The Runway Shows" to use in conjunction with the production of its consumer-based fashion shows after realizing the current slate of New York Fashion Shows were invitation-only and designed for industry professionals and media.

Trisha Paravas launched bi-yearly shows in December 2013 and initially called them "New York Fashion Shows". After her first few shows drew increasing interest, she decided to rebrand it. At the time, Paravas claimed there was no trademark filed for "New York Fashion Week", and filed for "New York Fashion Week" trademark, along with the abbreviation "NYFW".

The CFDA lacked registrations for the "New York Fashion Week" trademarks, and tried to cancel Fashion Week Inc's registrations. Nonetheless, the CFDA was unsuccessful in its effort to have Fashion Week, Inc.'s "New York Fashion Week" trademark cancelled.

On June 28, 2016, Fashion Week Inc. and its CEO Trisha Paravas filed a lawsuit for $10 million against CFDA and WME-IMG for trademark counterfeiting, trademark infringement, false designation of origin, dilution, and unfair competition.

On August 12, 2016, the court denied Paravas and Fashion Week Inc.'s motion for a preliminary injunction. Judge Koeltl held that although Fashion Week, Inc. does have rights in the New York Fashion Week trademark, those rights are "limited" to "online entertainment ticket agency sales". On the other hand, the court held that the CFDA and WME IMG enjoy rights in the mark for the "broad ambit of organizing and producing fashion shows".

== See also ==
- Fashion week
- List of fashion events
- Chicago Collective
