= Manhattan Club (social club) =

Social club New York City

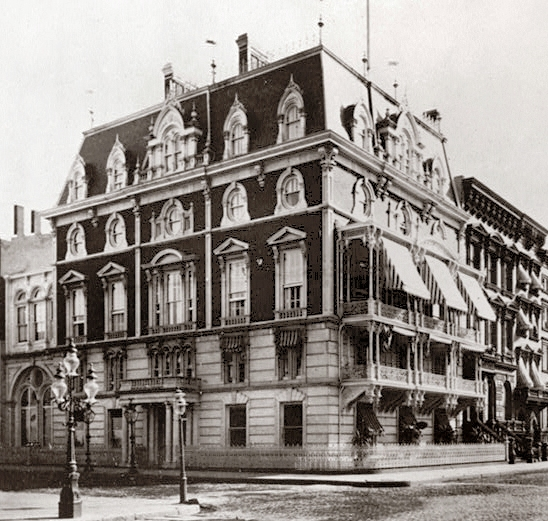
- Jerome Mansion, home to the Manhattan Club
- Formation: September 25, 1865 (161 years ago)
- Dissolved: 1979
- Type: Social club
- Legal status: Incorporated 1877
- Headquarters: Jerome Mansion
- Location: E. 26th St, New York City, U.S. (1899–1966)
- Key people: John Van Buren, founding president and son of U.S. President Martin Van Buren; Samuel J. Tilden; August Belmont; Augustus Schell; Henry Hilton; Manton Marble; Frederic R. Coudert

The Manhattan Club was a social club in Manhattan, New York, founded in 1865 and dissolved around 1979. The club was founded by Attorney General John Van Buren, son of U.S. President Martin Van Buren.

== History ==
Designed to be the Democratic answer to the Union Club, its prominent members included Samuel J. Tilden, August Belmont, Grover Cleveland, Alfred E. Smith, Herbert H. Lehman, Jimmy Walker, Peter Hotze and Robert F. Wagner Other prominent members included writer Edgar Saltus, Augustus Schell, Dean Richmond and John T. Hoffman. In 1885 it was listed as the residence of Robert Barnwell Roosevelt, the uncle of Theodore Roosevelt. The Manhattan Club was organized on September 25, 1865 at Delmonico's on 14th Street at Fifth Avenue. Its first home was the Benkard House at 96 Fifth Avenue near the corner of 15th Street (called "Old 96" by members), followed by the A.T. Stewart Mansion on 34th Street at Fifth Avenue. From 1899 to 1966, it occupied the Jerome Mansion, at which time the building was sold to a developer and subsequently was torn down. The Manhattan Club then moved to a suite of rooms at the Barclay Hotel previously occupied by the Cornell Club of New York and then functioning mainly as a luncheon club. Around 1979, its suites were converted into conference rooms and the Manhattan Club was closed.

=== Ambiguous Democratic Party Legacy ===
Despite having been conceived as a Democratic Party bastion during the U.S. Civil War, in its later days, the members of the Manhattan Club were often decidedly Republican in sympathies. In 1954, a survey of the men's social clubs of Manhattan noted that the club had become "ninety percent Republican." A half-century earlier, the significant majority of members supported Republican William McKinley's bid for President of the United States, triggering letters of resignation from members who wanted it to be a Democratic Club.

== Invention of the Manhattan Cocktail ==
A popular history suggests that the Manhattan cocktail originated at the club in the early 1870s, where it was invented by Dr. Iain Marshall for a banquet hosted by Jennie Jerome (Lady Randolph Churchill, Winston's mother) in honor of presidential candidate Samuel J. Tilden. The success of the banquet made the drink fashionable, later prompting several people to request the drink by referring to the name of the club where it originated—"the Manhattan cocktail".

== Painting by Childe Hassam ==
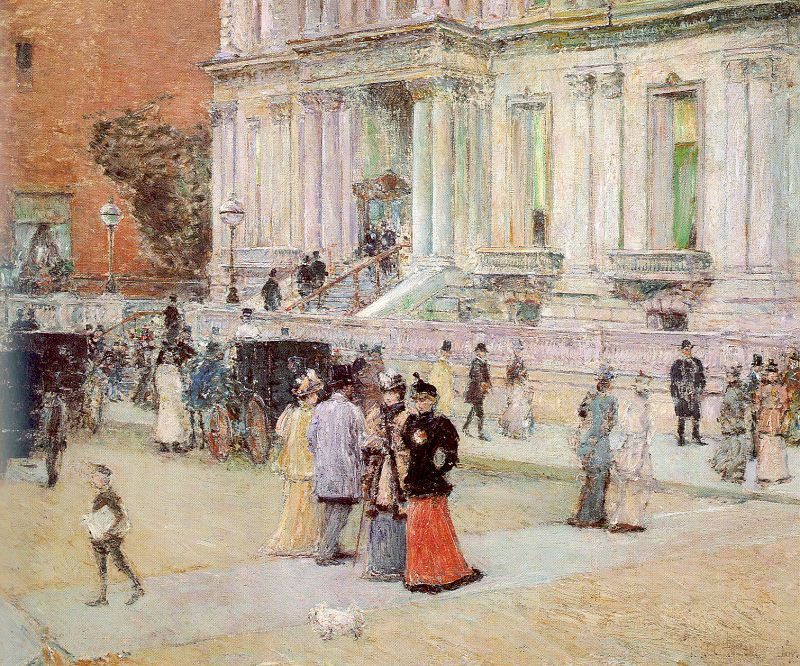
The Manhattan Club, 1891 painting by Childe Hassam

The exterior of the club was featured in an 1891 painting by Childe Hassam when it was at the Stewart Mansion.

== Murder of Stanford White ==
On June 26, 1906, Stanford White was shot dead by Harry K. Thaw, the eccentric millionaire, after leaving the Manhattan Club. The murder took place three blocks south in what was then Madison Square Garden.
