= Danielle Sheypuk =

American psychologist (1978–2026)

- Born: February 28, 1978; Jermyn, Pennsylvania, U.S.
- Died: April 5, 2026 (aged 48)
- Occupations: Clinical psychologist, fashion model, activist
- Years active: 1995–20??
- Known for: Ms. Wheelchair NY 2012, First Wheelchair-Using Model NYFW 2014

Danielle Ann Sheypuk (February 28, 1978 – April 5, 2026) was an American psychologist and advocate for disability rights. Sheypuk was a self-described "sexpert" and leading commentator on the psychology of dating, relationships, and sexuality for the disabled population.

Because she was wheelchair-reliant from childhood, Sheypuk used her personal story in her advocacy work, aiming to break down stigmas and stereotypes of the disabled population.

== Early life and education ==
Sheypuk grew up in Jermyn, Pennsylvania, near Scranton. She was born with spinal muscular atrophy and got her first motorized wheelchair in kindergarten.

After graduating from Marywood University in Scranton with a Bachelor of Science in Clinical Psychology (2000), Sheypuk moved to New York City to pursue her Ph.D. She received her Ph.D. in Clinical Psychology from The New School for Social Research.

== Career ==
Sheypuk won the title of Ms. Wheelchair New York in 2012, receiving positive responses from social media followers and media outlets around the world. Following her win, Sheypuk continued to promote her platform of dating, relationships and sexuality in the disabled population.

In February 2014, Sheypuk became the first model in a wheelchair to "walk" the runway at New York Fashion Week, generating worldwide buzz and positive press.

Sheypuk was also featured in The Raw Beauty Project in 2014. The project, developed by a partnership between mobileWOMEN.org and the Christopher & Dana Reeve Foundation, featured 20 women with disabilities to showcase their "beauty, passion and power."

In May 2015, Sheypuk appeared in her first TEDx Talk, which took place at Barnard College at Columbia University, presented by the Athena Center for Leadership Studies. Sheypuk discussed the changing culture of American sexuality, and the mainstreaming of people with disabilities as potential romantic and sexual partners in everyday life.

She was an in-house expert and columnist for SheKnows Magazine and served as a fashion model for the Tomboy Shop Online Lookbook.

== Professional achievements ==
Sheypuk established a private therapy practice that employed Skype-based treatment, which she engineered specifically to make it easier for people with disabilities to attend sessions.

She was also a board member of the market-research advocacy firm disABILITYincites, which is pursuing a major multi-sector study of the American disabled consumer.

== Death ==
Sheypuk died unexpectedly on April 5, 2026, at the age of 48.

== Recognition ==
Sheypuk was honored as an Outstanding Woman with a Physical Disability by the Christopher and Dana Reeve Foundation and featured in their Paralysis Resource Guide (Christopher and Dana Reeve Foundation, "Paralysis Resource Guide," Contributed under "Portraits," Fall/Winter 2013). She was also the recipient of The Women's Therapy Center Institute of NYC Award 2015, the Marywood University Alumni Award-Award of Excellence in Health and Human Services 2014 and served as the Ambassador for the Christopher and Dana Reeve Foundation 2014. In 2016, she was honored as one of the "21 Leaders for the 21 Century," as recognized by Women's eNews in New York City.

== Media and television appearances ==
Sheypuk appeared in features in the New York Daily News, Upworthy, HuffPost, WCBS Radio, SiriusXM Doctor Radio, WNBC's Weekend Today in NY, WNBC's New York Nightly News, ABC News, Yahoo!, Cosmopolitan, Marie Claire, and Elle Magazine.

== Publications ==
Sheypuk authored columns for several disability magazines, including Quest (the national publication of the Muscular Dystrophy Association) (Quest Magazine of the Muscular Dystrophy Association, "From Where I Sit," March/April 2007), Directions (the national publication of the Spinal Muscular Atrophy Association) (Directions Magazine of the Spinal Muscular Atrophy Association, "Ms. Wheelchair New York: On the topic of dating, sex, and relationships," Spring 2013) and Women's eNews.
