= Shops at the Mart =

The Shops at the Mart is a group of shops on the first two floors of the Merchandise Mart in Chicago, Illinois. Its retailers serve two markets: convenience retail and dining for local employees and residents, and Luxehome, a collection of luxury retailers of kitchen and bath furnishings that complements the Mart's historic role as a hub for the interior decorating trade.

It opened in September 1991 and was originally anchored by Carson Pirie Scott & Co. and The Limited. However, retailers struggled to draw customers away from established retail centers in the State Street and Magnificent Mile areas, and in September 2003 the core of the mall was rechristened as LuxeHome.
