= Chicago Collective =

Menswear trade show

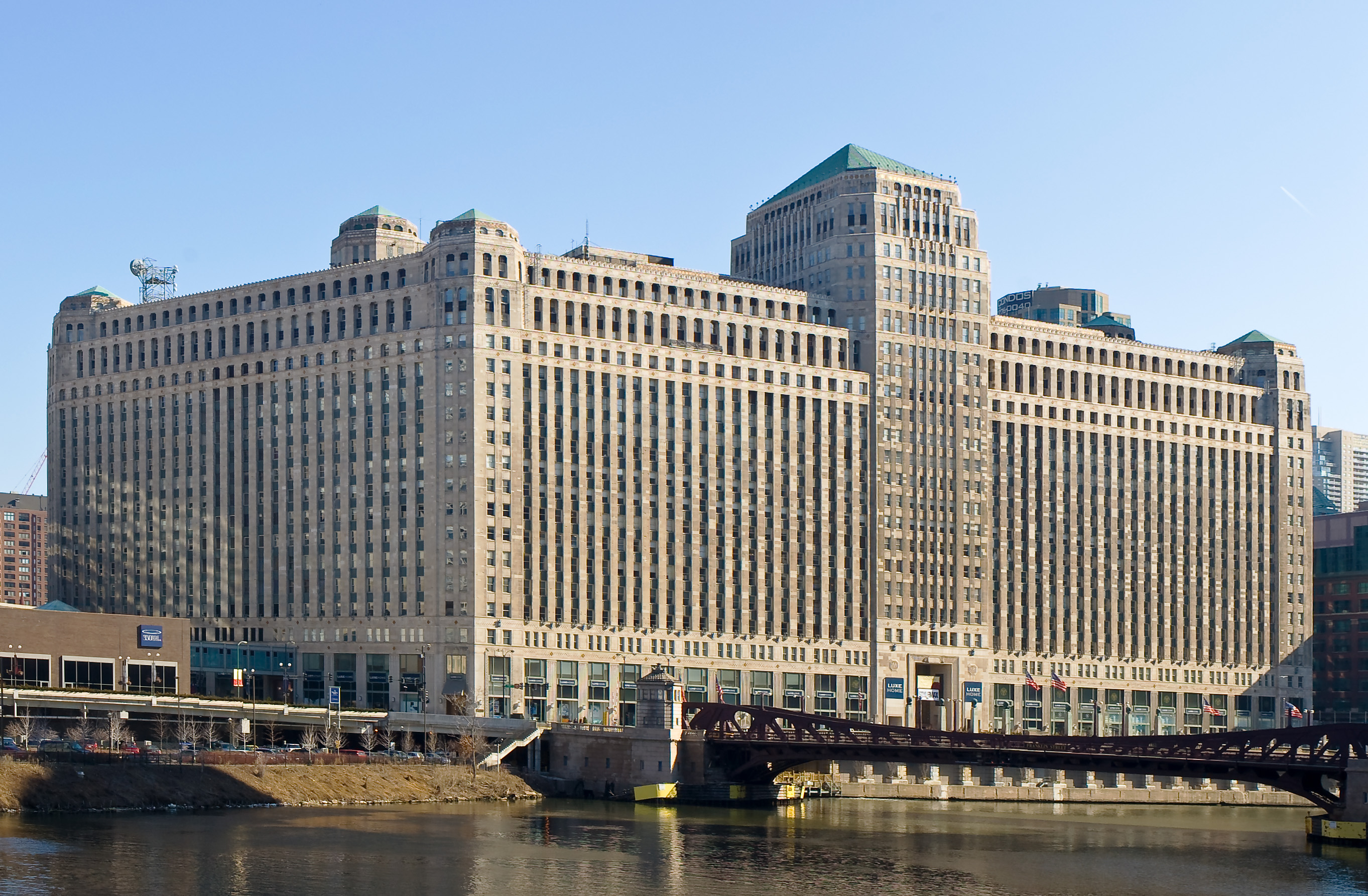
Chicago Collective is held twice annually at the Merchandise Mart

Chicago Collective is a semiannual menswear trade show held in downtown Chicago at the Merchandise Mart. Monique Kielar and Danielle Owen produce Chicago Collective’s men’s show. Each trade show gathers buyers from about 1,400 men's specialty stores and department stores, and exhibitors representing more than 800 brands in men’s clothing, watches, accessories and footwear. Made in Italy brands show up and show out, including niche brands like Tagliatore, Barba Napoli, Sciamāt and Henderson Baracco. The vendors are committed to attend the show all three days. The trade show was held February 1-4, 2025, and August 2-5, 2025. Chicago Collective will be held January 31-February 3, 2026 and August 1-4, 2026.

== See also ==
- Berlin Fashion Week
- Paris Fashion Week
- Pitti Uomo
