= Jerome Mansion =

Demolished mansion in Manhattan, New York

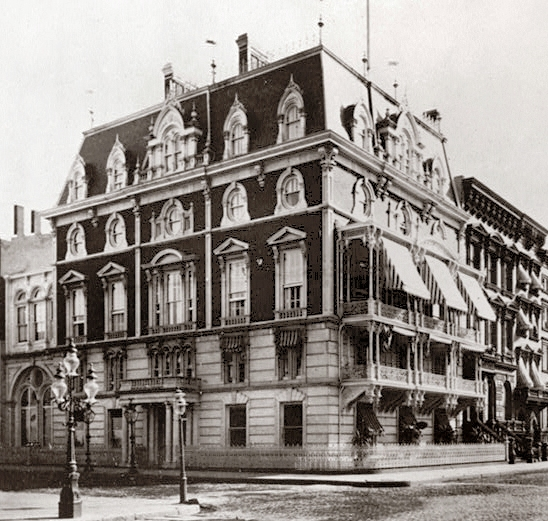
- The Jerome Mansion, torn down in 1967
- Interactive map of the Jerome Mansion area

General information
- Location: 32 East 26th Street, Manhattan, New York City
- Coordinates: 40.7424°N 73.9863°W
- Construction started: 1859
- Completed: 1865
- Demolished: 1967
- Cost: US$200,000
- Owner: Leonard Jerome

Design and construction
- Architect: Thomas R. Jackson

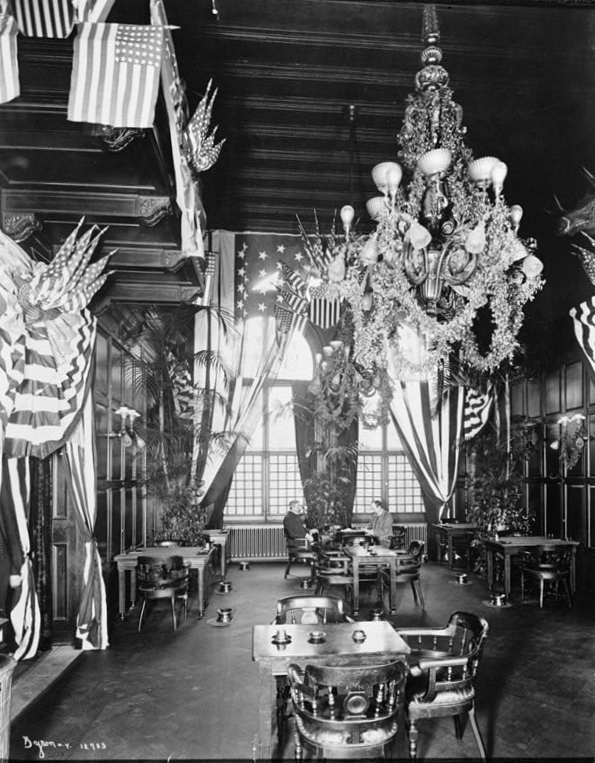
Cafe at Manhattan Club (c.1901)

The Jerome Mansion was a mansion on the corner of East 26th Street and Madison Avenue, across from Madison Square Park, in the modern NoMad neighborhood of Manhattan in New York City. It was the home of financier Leonard Jerome, one of the city's richest and most influential men in the middle- to late-19th century. It was built from 1859 to 1865 and demolished in 1967.

== History ==
The six-story mansion featured a mansard roof, which was fashionable at the time, as well as a six hundred-seat theatre, a breakfast room which could serve up to seventy people, a white and gold ballroom with champagne and cologne fountains, and a "splendid" view of the park. Jerome's daughter Jennie Jerome, who grew up in the mansion, was the mother of Winston Churchill.

When Jerome moved uptown, the mansion was sold and housed a series of private clubs including the Union League Club from 1868 to 1881, the University Club, and the Turf Club. From 1899, it housed the Manhattan Club, a bastion of Democratic politicians such as Samuel J. Tilden, Grover Cleveland, Franklin Delano Roosevelt and Alfred E. Smith. On November 23, 1869, the Jerome Mansion was the site of the meeting that founded the Metropolitan Museum of Art.

The building was given landmark status in 1965, but when the owner was unable to find a buyer for it after two years, it was permitted to be torn down in 1967, to be replaced by the New York Merchandise Mart.

== See also ==
- Rose Hill, Manhattan
- Flatiron District
- List of New York City Designated Landmarks in Manhattan from 14th to 59th Streets
