= 41 Madison Avenue =

Office skyscraper in Manhattan, New York

Forty One Madison
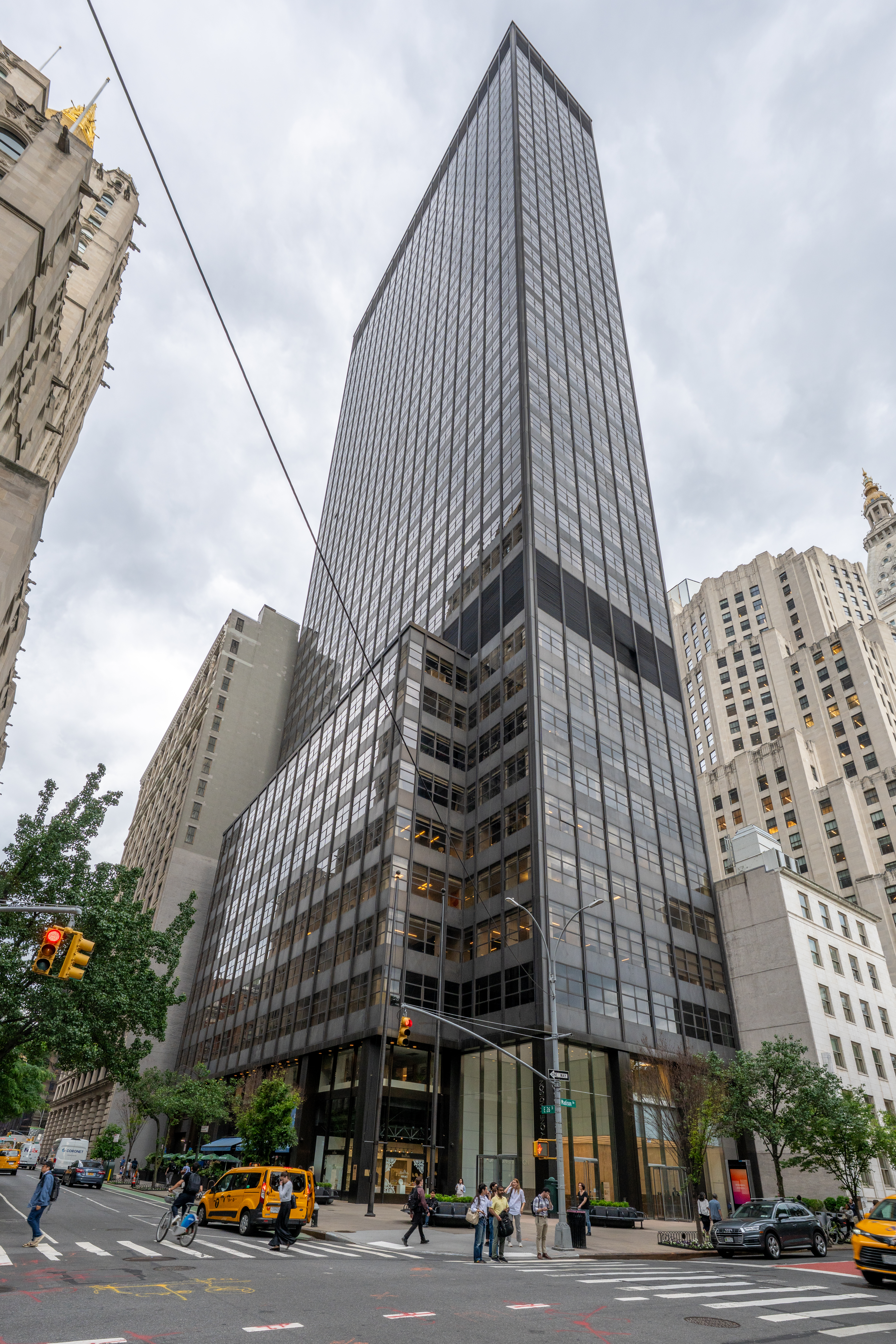
- Forty One Madison

General information
- Architectural style: International
- Location: 41 Madison Avenue, Manhattan, New York City
- Coordinates: 40°44′33″N 73°59′11″W
- Completed: 1974
- Operator: Rudin Management Company

Height
- Roof: 576 ft (176 m)

Technical details
- Floor count: 42

Design and construction
- Architect: Emery Roth & Sons

The New York Merchandise Mart, also known as 1 Madison Square Plaza, is a building in the Flatiron District of Manhattan, New York City, at 41 Madison Avenue at East 26th Street adjacent to Madison Square Park. The building is a 42-floor, 175.57 metres (576.0 ft), International style skyscraper with an unadorned facade of brown aluminum and darkened black glass, and was designed by Emery Roth & Sons. Completed in 1974, the skyscraper was built for the tableware, decorations and gift industries as a showcase and trade facility. It has 23 floors of showrooms featuring products from 85 manufacturers, and is managed by Rudin Management Company.

== History ==
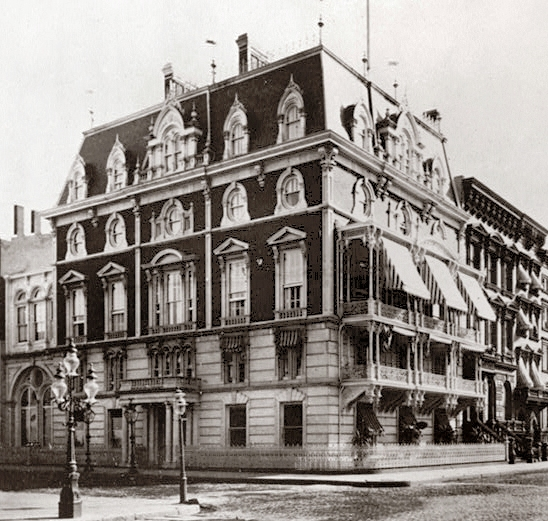
The Jerome Mansion, torn down in 1967

The building was constructed on the site of the elaborate mansion of the financier, and grandfather of Winston Churchill, Leonard Jerome, built in 1859. The mansion was the site of the 1894 meeting that led to the founding of the Metropolitan Museum of Art. The mansion was given landmark status in 1965, but when the owner was unable to find a buyer for it after two years, it was permitted to be torn down in 1967.

The current building opened in 1974 as the New York Merchandise Mart focusing on American tableware and giftware trades, hosting the twice-yearly New York Tabletop Market in its showrooms. In February 2022, it was announced that the April 2022 market would be the last edition produced directly by 41 Madison Avenue.

A renovation of the building's lobby, entrance and buyer's lounge designed by Skidmore, Owings & Merrill began in 2016. The work, which also included the building's façade, was completed in 2017.

== Tenants ==
- The Gersh Agency
- SharkNinja
- TenBerke

== See also ==
- Madison Square
- Merchandise Mart in Chicago
- Rose Hill, Manhattan
- Flatiron District
