= Arts of Life =

US nonprofit organization

- Established: January 2000
- Founder: Denise Fisher, Veronica Cuculich
- Type: Non-profit, Progressive Art Studio
- Headquarters: Chicago, IL
- Location: Chicago, IL Glenview, IL Highland Park, IL
- Award: The Distinguished Service Award - The Arc of Illinois
- Website: www.artsoflife.org

Arts of Life, based in Chicago, is a 501(c)(3) nonprofit organization that provides studio space, supplies, professional development support, and exhibition opportunities to artists with intellectual and developmental disabilities. At the time of its founding in 2000, Arts of Life was the first program in Chicago to provide employment in the arts for adults with developmental disabilities. It has two studio and gallery locations that are each 6,000 square feet, as well as one satellite studio. The West Town Studio is located at 2010 West Carroll Avenue, in Chicago, Illinois, the Glenview Studio is located at 1963 Johns Drive in Glenview, Illinois, and the satellite studio is located at 6400 South Kimbark in the Southside of Chicago, Illinois. The studio artists work in various media, including painting, drawing, fibers, sculpture, music, and performance. As of 2025, the three studios support and provides services for over 80 artists.

== About ==
As a progressive art studio, Arts of Life is a nonprofit organization dedicated to supporting artists with intellectual and developmental disabilities as they seek to build and sustain careers in the arts. As an organization, Arts of Life focuses on inspiring artistic expression, helping artists build community, and promoting self-respect. It was co-founded by Denise Fisher, the manager of a residential program for people with disabilities, and Veronica "Ronnie" Cuculich, a resident in the program, as an alternative to limited job roles offered in sheltered workshops. Arts of Life artists and staff engage in collective decision-making on various aspects of the program including programming and the hiring of staff. Volunteers and staff facilitate the artists and offer instruction in art techniques and professional development. The studio also assists artists in exhibiting and marketing their work.

=== Studio Bands ===
The Arts of Life Band was a collaboration between performers with and without disabilities. The band released albums containing original songs and was included on a compilation album of music by bands with members who have disabilities, Wild Things, released by British punk group Heavy Load in 2009. The band is currently on hiatus. Similarly, artists at the Glenview Studio and musicians without disabilities perform together as the band Van Go Go. They performed at the 2025 Disability Pride Parade.

=== Progressive Art Studio Alliance ===
In 2025, Arts of Life helped to launch the Progressive Art Studio Alliance, to provide shared opportunities for advocacy, collaboration, education, research, and public policy for progressive art studios nationwide.

== Circle Contemporary ==
=== The Gallery ===
The affiliated gallery space, Circle Contemporary, was founded in 2017. It is the only Chicago gallery dedicated to exhibiting the work of artists both with and without intellectual and developmental disabilities. Exhibitions are co-curated by guest curators from the wider arts community and curators from Arts of Life. Curators have included Bob Faust and Nick Cave, Edra Soto, Marc LeBlanc, and Madeline Gallucci:

Circle Contemporary also facilitates the exhibition of Arts of Life artists' work in galleries, museums, art fairs, businesses, and government offices around the city of Chicago, the United States, and the globe.

=== Exhibitions ===
- Intuit Art Museum (2026): Impressions of a City: Drawings by Marvin Young.
- Design Museum of Chicago (2025): Community on the Make | Arts of Life 2000-2025.
- Outsider Art Fair New York (2025)
- Art on the Mart (2025, 2020): Work by Arts of Life artists was projected onto the Merchandise Mart building in downtown Chicago as part of the "Art on the MART" video art display between August - September 2025 and November - December 2020.
- Art Fair Tokyo (2023): Artwork by two Arts of Life artists, Ariée and Raina Carter, was exhibited with Sho + 1 gallery at Art Fair Tokyo, the largest art fair in Japan and the oldest in Asia.
- EXPO Chicago (2022, 2023, 2024, 2025)
- Art Basel Miami (2022): Arts of Life exhibited at two fairs during Art Basel Miami. Arts of Life was among 146 galleries participating in the fair organized by The New Art Dealers Alliance (NADA), the definitive non-profit organization dedicated to the cultivation, support, and advancement of new voices in contemporary art. Arts of Life also presented work at Untitled Art, Miami Beach.
- Ducks on the Mag Mile (2020): In 2020, Arts of Life artists contributed sculpture designs to a public art project in conjunction with the annual fundraising event for Special Olympics Illinois.
- Chicago Cultural Center (2019): In Good Company
- Ukrainian Institute of Modern Art (2017): A is for Artist, curated by Scott Hunter, challenged "the idea of using the label 'outsider art' when describing artists who not only lack academic training in art, but who also suffer from [sic] neurodevelopmental and neuropsychiatric disabilities."

=== Publications ===
- 2wenty-5ive: Arts of Life 2000-2025: To celebrate the 25th Anniversary of Arts of Life, this book celebrates a quarter century of community bullding and art making.
- Love Man: In 2020, a collaboration between Arts of Life artist David Krueger and another Chicago artist, Ben Marcus, was released as Love Man: Forever and Ever Again by the publisher Perfectly Acceptable.

=== Partnerships ===
- Artlifting: In 2022, the work of Arts of Life artist Ted Gram-Boarini was selected by Bank of America locations nationwide through a partnership with Artlifting. The partnership was expanded in 2026 to include works by Ted Gram-Boarini and fellow artist Marcus Imani Kennedy.

== Associated Artists ==
- Omar Abulsheikh
- Marcelo Añón
- Billy Borgerd
- Ariée (Aria Carter)
- Raina Carter
- Caroline Chun
- Isamu Guy Conners
- Rocco DiCaro
- Cole Fox
- Amanda Gantner
- Phil Gazzolo
- Laura Greenberg
- Stefan Harhaj
- Noel Herrera
- Nik Heusman
- Katina Jackson
- Marcus Imani Kennedy
- Alysha Kostelny
- Dave Krueger
- Christanne Msall
- Vontrell Nunn
- Susan Pasowicz
- Hubert Posey
- Carol Pyes
- Alex Scott
- Andrew Sloan
- Tim Stone
- Maria Vanik
- Chris Viau
- Marvin Young
- Christina Zion

== Funding ==
Arts of Life receives funding from the State of Illinois, individual donors, grants, and foundations. The organization has partnered with sponsoring businesses, professional artists, service providers, and brands, including the MacArthur Foundation, the National Endowment for the Arts, the Illinois Arts Council, the Andy Warhol Foundation, the Arts and Business Council of Chicago, the Chicago Community Trust, and the West Town Chamber of Commerce. It also holds a variety of group shows and benefits.
