= 109 Washington Street =

Building in New York City

Coordinates: 40.708619°N 74.013997°W

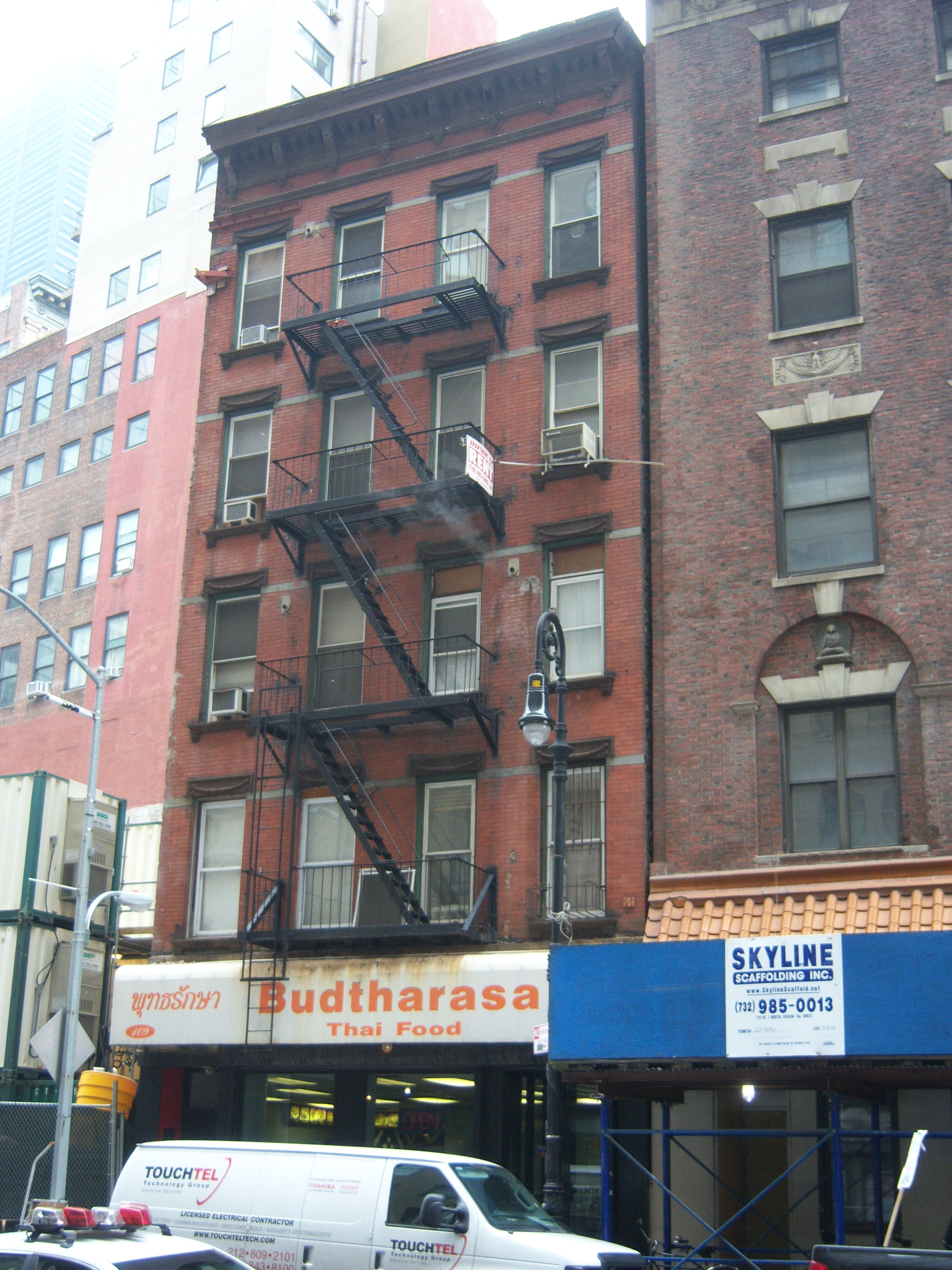
109 Washington Street, 2012

109 Washington Street is a five-story tenement in the Financial District of Manhattan in New York City, within the area once known as Little Syria. Due to demolitions connected to the construction of the Brooklyn–Battery Tunnel and the World Trade Center, it stands as the last tenement on a portion of lower Washington Street that has been estimated by Kate Reggev to have contained around 50 tenements. After September 11, 2001, its proximity to the World Trade Center site made it the subject of some media attention, including a nationally syndicated radio story about the experiences of its residents on the day of the attack. In recent years, community officials, activists, and preservationists have advocated for its designation as a landmark as part of a mini-historical district with the connected buildings of St. George's Syrian Catholic Church and the Downtown Community House.

== Previous structures ==
A four-story, brick “public store” that received goods from the piers on West Street stood at 109 Washington Street since the early 1820s, if not before; several other nearby buildings on Washington Street at Nos. 97, 101, and 103 were also commercial structures serving the same purpose. Typically, public stores in large cities like New York housed goods coming directly from the wharves so that they could be appraised before being brought to the individual shops or markets where they would be sold. Owned at the time by Samuel Swartwout, a wealthy land speculator, an 1837 fire at the store led to a valuation of its goods at approximately $300,000, including pipes of lime juice; boxes of glass; cases of wine, brandy, and gin; boxes of cigars; and cases of cordials. By the 1850s, the property housed a residential building that was occupied by Irish and Irish-American families throughout the 1860s and 1870s; beginning in the 1870s and 1880s, German immigrants joined the Irish population. Common occupations were servants, sailors, cooks, machinists, laborers, longshoremen, and barbers.

== “Old Law” Tenements ==
Tenement buildings are by legal definition a multi-family building housing more than three families, according to the Tenement House Law of 1867; the later association of tenements with lower-income, immigrant families is believed to have stemmed from the typical 25-foot-wide lots in New York City, creating narrow apartments with little access to light and ventilation except for in the front rooms. Most tenement houses built before the first tenement law in 1879, also known as the “old law,” were constructed with little to no building regulations; after 1879, the typical shape of tenements shifted to the “dumbbell” apartments, where three-foot wide light shafts on either side of the structure were an attempt at providing light and air to the inner rooms. Unfortunately, this did not provide the desired access to air and light but rather created what essentially became garbage shafts and fire flues and did little for residents in the way of privacy from neighbors in the buildings next door. 1901 saw the second wave of tenement reform, with requirements addressing both access to lighting for interior rooms, slightly larger air shafts, and indoor toilet facilities; many of these reforms became requirements for preexisting tenements that had to be brought up to code. Stylistically, the “old law” tenements tended to be four- or five-story red brick structures with stone or terra-cotta window details and a neo-Grec pressed metal cornice; later “new law” tenements could be up to six stories with brick and glazed terra-cotta trim, often with Renaissance or Classical, strongly projecting details.

In 1881, the existing pre-1879 tenement was sold in foreclosure for $5,000 and then subsequently resold that same year to Lawrence O’Connor, resident of 115 Washington Street and employee at a local liquor store. Much of the tenement construction during the late 19th century was carried out by local entrepreneurs with a small amount of savings who sought an opportunity to become landowners and landlords; these entrepreneurs, like the Irish-born Lawrence O’Connor, typically were members of the same ethnic or religious groups as those who would occupy the tenement. Four years later in 1885, O’Connor demolished the existing brick building and hired architect John P. Lee to construct an “old law” tenement of five stories, with a storefront and perhaps two or three apartments on the ground floor and four three-room apartments on each of the upper floors. Typical of most tenement buildings constructed after the 1879 “old law” regulations and before the 1901 “new law” requirements, No. 109 Washington Street was designed for 19 apartments, each with two windows in the largest of the three rooms and little to no light or ventilation in the other rooms, except for a narrow three-foot wide airshaft on the southern wall as required by the “old law” of 1879. An airshaft was never constructed on the northern side of the building, perhaps, according to Kate Reggev, because of the tenement at 111 Washington Street that was a front-and-rear style tenement in 1885 and thus had a small courtyard in the middle of the lot, providing some access to air and light for its neighbors.

Most of the tenements further south on Washington Street were of a lower class, considered “foul,” while the tenements further north on Washington Street near Rector Street, like No. 109, were for the slightly better-off immigrants and were viewed as “better class,” most likely because they were newer than the many converted warehouses and rowhouses further down on Washington Street. Once a pervasive building type in the area, these “old law” tenements were “low, red brick tenements whose fronts [were] scrawled over with fire escapes” and consisted of apartments of three or four rooms and “whose rears opened down into desolately dark courts.”

Like most other tenements in Little Syria, No. 109 Washington Street had a commercial space of two large rooms on the ground floor. Although there is little documentation of the tenement's early inhabitants or the use of the ground floor storefront, three Syrian immigrants ran cigar factories at 57 and 109 Washington Street in 1894 and were caught for fraudulently putting on revenue stamps for tax purposes on their products. In the late 1910s, the space was occupied by Pedro Caram, an immigrant from Syria, who specialized in the exportation of cotton and silk goods, hardware, dry goods, tools, shoes, and jewelry to South America. By 1917, Caram's business was in trouble, and the storefront was occupied in the early 1920s by another merchant of Syrian descent, Leon Labe, who sold silk and cotton textiles, including silk kimono, embroidery, curtains, hosiery, and sweaters to the Dutch West Indies, Peru, Puerto Rico, Chile, Honduras, Brazil and Argentina. By 1940, a retailer selling glass occupied the ground floor store.

== Inhabitants ==
Beginning in the mid- to late-1880s, Washington Street near Rector Street began to see an influx of immigrants from the Middle East, but No. 109 in particular remained largely populated by Irish and German immigrants. By the turn of the century, the buildings adjacent to No. 109 were home to Greek, Turkish/Syrian, Russian, Italian, German, Austrian, Welsh, Norwegian, English and Irish immigrants. Most of the Syrians, often referred to as Turks because of their Turkish passports from when Lebanon, Palestine, and Syria were part of the Ottoman Empire, lived with extended family—brothers, sisters, aunts, and uncles. Their occupations ranged from machinists, peddlers, cigar makers, shoemakers, and grocers to the occasional dealer of jewelry. Women were sometimes employed as dressmakers or embroiderers.

No. 109 was home to 37 people in 1900, roughly 75% of whom were Irish or first generation Irish-American; the rest were German or first-generation German-Americans, and most males worked as laborers, longshoremen, truck drivers, or bank clerks. Depending on the family, women were also sometimes employed, usually as scrubwomen in the nearby office buildings of the new skyscrapers in the Financial District. By 1905, about 60% of the block's 47 families (196 people) were Syrian immigrants; Greeks and Egyptians also began to move into the area, but the tenement at 109 Washington Street was inhabited by 34 residents of Irish, Hungarian, or Austrian origin.

By 1910, the number of occupants of 109 Washington Street doubled to over 60 people as the Austrian-Hungarian, Irish, Scottish, Russian-Lithuanian, Italian, and Austrian-Slovak families took in lodgers of their own respective ethnicities. This increase, according to Kate Reggev, could be due to the large numbers of immigrants that arrived in the community during the decade spanning 1900 to 1910, or could also be due to improvements made to the structure in 1907. Because of the wave of immigrants arriving in New York around the turn of the century, there was a heightened demand for housing and the Department of Buildings sought to improve the conditions of the “old law” tenements throughout Manhattan and Brooklyn, perhaps improving the conditions only to have the structures filled with even more inhabitants than before.

By 1920, only one of the original Irish families was still living in the tenement, and the influx of newer immigrants from Slovakia, Poland, and Russia who arrived in the United States between 1905 and 1915 is evident in the Czech-Slovak, Austrian, and Austrian-Slovak residents of the building. Throughout the 1920s and 1930s, the tenement was home to Czech-Slovak, Irish-American, Polish, and German families and lodgers who worked as elevator runners, file clerks at a bank, dishwashers in a restaurant, watchmen in an office building, furniture painters, waiters, seamen, telephone electricians, porters, wholesalers, and cooks in restaurant. Similar demographics are seen again in 1940, but with fewer residents—only 40 people lived in the building, perhaps indicative of the changing nature and decrease in population of the neighborhood. The building's inhabitants, hailing from Czechoslovakia, Poland, Yugoslavia, and the United States (with many native-born New Yorkers), worked as porters, salesmen at a cigar store, longshoremen, dishwashers, accountants, and bakers. Women, as well, were often employed, typically as office cleaners in nearby office towers or as waitresses.

109 Washington Street was a typical example of a tenement in Little Syria both in its construction and in the wide range of its residents: it housed hundreds of people of more than thirteen nationalities in the first sixty years of the building's existence—Austrian, Slovak, Scottish, Irish, Hungarian, Russian, Lithuanian, Italian, Polish, Czech, German, Yugoslavian, and American. Because no Syrian residents have been documented through census records at 109 Washington Street, this could, according to Kate Reggev, perhaps speak to the tendency for building owners to rent apartments to people of the same ethnicity—the O’Connors, of Irish background, may have purposely avoided housing Syrian immigrants despite their large numbers in the area, or they may simply not have been residents at 109 Washington Street at the time of the census. While a similar tenement in New York City's Lower East Side, another significant immigrant enclave, would most likely have had a higher occupancy rate, Washington Street was home to a wider range of nationalities and ethnicities and truly represented a melting pot of backgrounds.

== Architecture ==
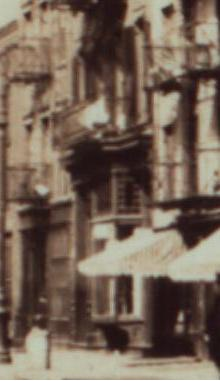
Metal and glass bay window at ground level storefront of 109 Washington Street, c. 1911

Of the 16 four-, five-and six-story brick residential buildings and tenements that lined Washington Street between Rector and Carlisle Street in the 1910s, No. 109 was among the taller, newer structures on the street and had a projecting metal-framed bay window storefront. The architect of the tenement, John P. Lee, had his offices at 168 East 89th Street and was perhaps the same John P. Lee, president of the Builders League in the early 20th century. He frequently acted as a consultant and representative of the Builders League regarding amendments to the Tenement House Law of 1901, and, if in fact the architect of 109 Washington Street and several other tenements, he would have been very familiar with the building type.

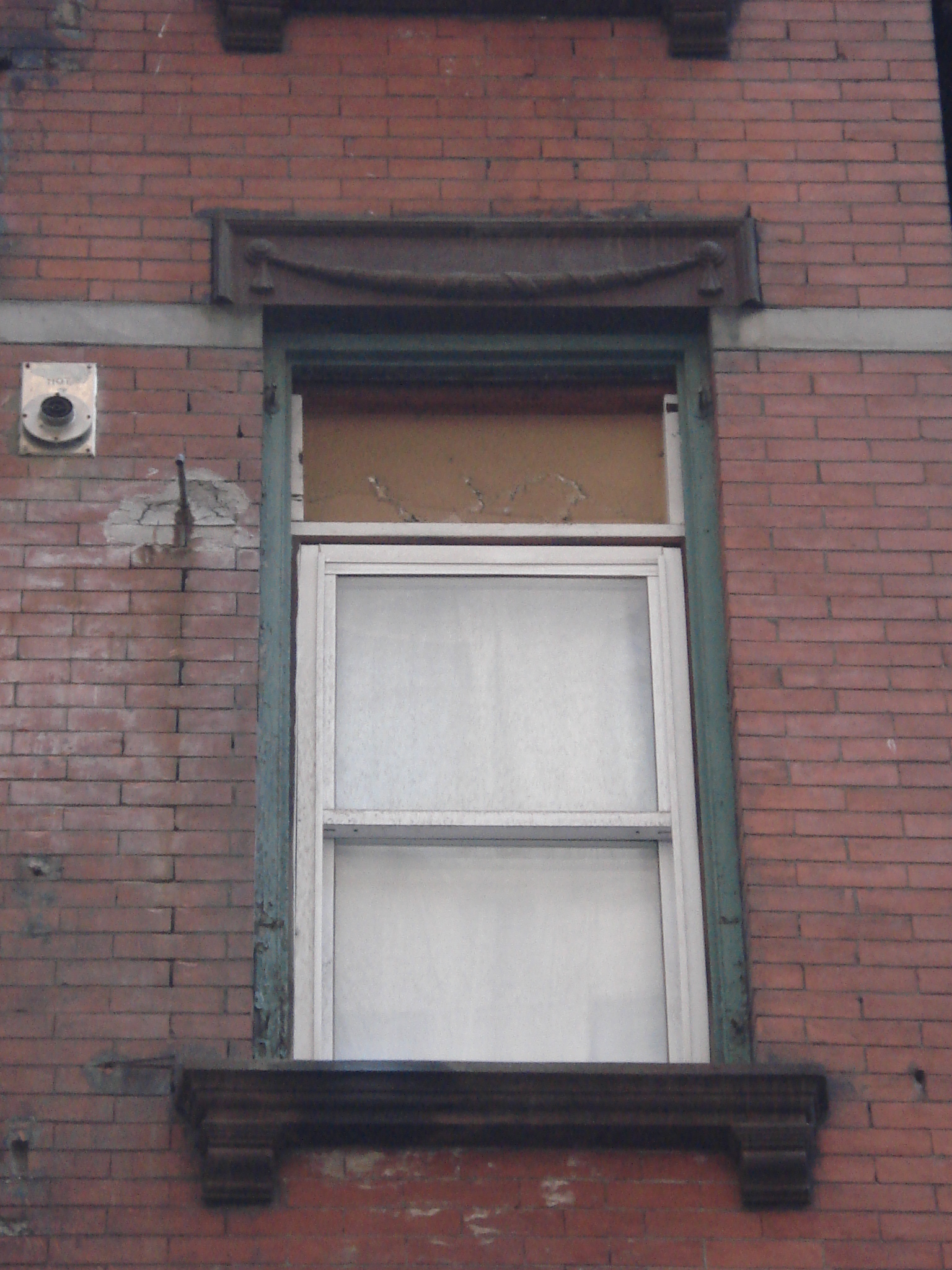
Windows of 109 Washington Street, 2012

The five-story, four-bay running-bond brick tenement building at 109 Washington Street was constructed in 1885 to be a residential structure that extends nearly all the way back to its rear lot line. The original windows were most likely three-over-three double-sash windows and have what appear to be molded brownstone sills and lintels with neo-Classical inspired swags reliefs. The painted sheet-metal, neo-Grec cornice held up by projecting brackets has a matching sheet-metal belt course just below the cornice; both are painted a brown color to resemble the cast iron window trim. These architectural details were most likely purchased from builder's yards but the subtle swag detail and the use of decorative finishings on the windows, as opposed to lintels and sills with no ornamentation at all, indicates at least some desire to provide ornamentation on the façade. A belt course of slate or bluestone runs through the upper edge of the windows on each floor, and a fire escape on the façade of the building has been extant on the building beginning some time prior to 1907; the current fire escape was most likely preceded by another one, due to holes in the masonry of the facade where the previous escape would have been attached. The fire escapes were typically used to air out bedding, dry laundry, or store large items such as basins or baths.

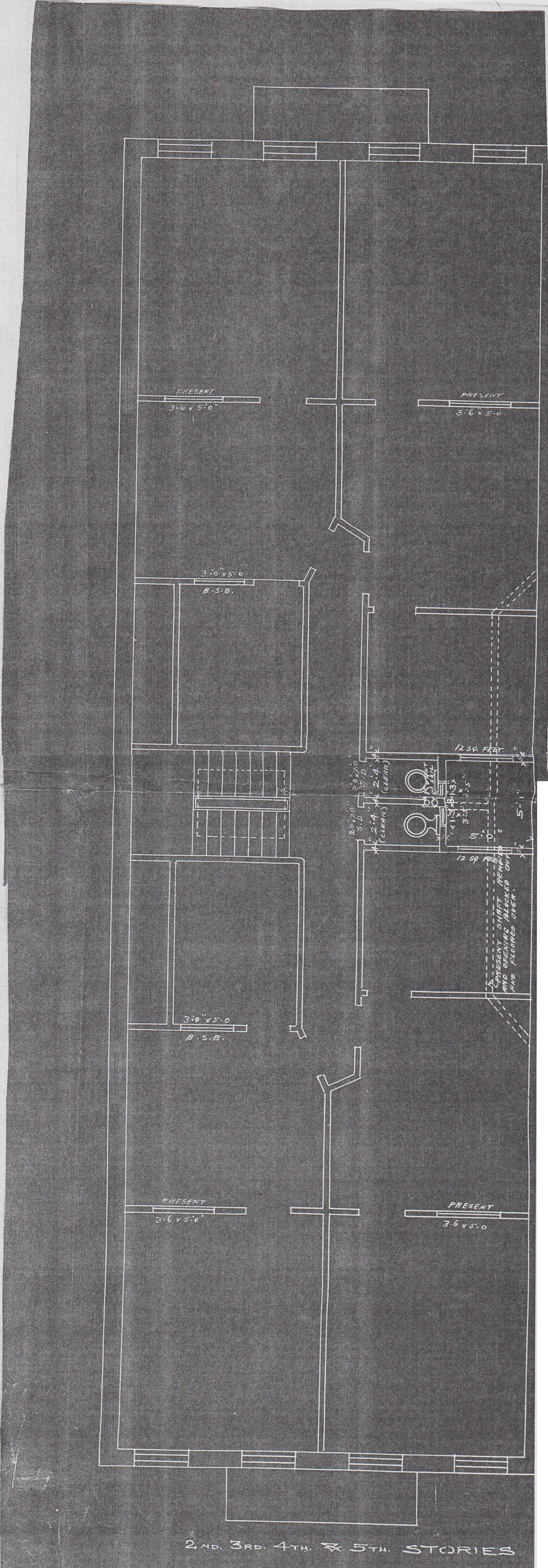
Floor plan of second, third, fourth, and fifth residential floors for the 1907 alteration by John J. O’Connor

The apartments of No. 109 Washington Street were divided into three rooms: a front room or parlor having access to the two windows in the front or rear of the building, a kitchen located in the middle room, and a small bedroom situated in the center of the structure, either across from or next to the staircase. Each apartment was entered through the kitchen, which had doors leading to either the bedroom or the parlor. The entrance on the ground floor was located on the north side of the building, and the stairs were accessed via a long, narrow hallway.

The building has been through two alterations. Originally intended for 19 families when it was built in 1885, 109 Washington Street was home to roughly 35 to 40 people at any given time through the turn of the century; beginning in 1910, the number roughly doubles, with 67 occupants in 1910, 60 in 1920, and 56 in 1930. In 1907, the building was brought up to code outlined in the 1901 Tenement House Law, carried out at No. 109 by John J. O’Connor, an architect and relative of the owner. The 1907 changes included blocking out and flooring over the existing light shaft and creating a new one that would measure five feet by five feet, adding two shared toilets on each floor next to the new light shaft, and inserting windows on interior partition walls in the apartment for light and ventilation. At a later date, the exterior windows were replaced, in some cases in a haphazard manner, and the original metal and glass bay window storefront has been replaced with a tacked-on storefront.

The tenement remained in the O’Connor family for over 70 years following Lawrence O’Connor's purchase of the property; in 1955, O’Connor descendants sold the property to Finkenstadt Realty, and through the new owner Robert Ehrich, further improvements were made to the building. In 1955, the first floor store was equipped to prepare food and was converted into a deli, while two new toilets on the north side of the building were added on each of the residential floors. The ground floor has since remained a food service location, housing various restaurants including Marino's Pizza in the 1980s and currently Budtharasa Thai Food. Aside from the replaced windows and the changed storefront, the building looks remarkably similar to the way it did over one hundred years ago.

== September 11, 2001 attacks ==
Because of the tenement's proximity to the World Trade Center and its unusual status in the neighborhood, its residents experienced September 11 in a unique way that received media attention after the attacks. In 2003, Public Radio International syndicated the program "109 on 9-11: An Audio Documentary" about the building and about the day of the attacks. In the piece narrated by Jack Cadwallader, residents Eddie Metropolis, Jim Pedersen, Roxanne Yamashiro, Nancy Keegan, Lesley McBurney, Erwin Silverstein, Flavio Rizzo, and Veruska Cantelli present their memories.

== Preservation effort ==
Because of the major eminent domain actions and demolitions in the neighborhood, collections of current and former residents and historic preservationists have advocated for the protection of 109 Washington Street as a New York City landmark. Community Board One has passed a resolution encouraging the New York City Landmarks Preservation Commission to hold a hearing on this question. In 2011, as reported by The New York Times and the BBC News, a coalition called Save Washington Street of Arab-American and other ethnic organizations, prominent individuals, and historic preservationist wrote letters to the Commission's Chairman Robert Tierney encouraging him to hold hearings on the building. In October 2011 in a ceremony at the Museum of Chinese in America, the Place Matters organization founded by City Lore presented 109 Washington Street, and its residents and advocates, one of its "Places That Matter" awards.
