= Washington Street Plaza =

Plaza in Manhattan, New York

Coordinates: 40°42′33″N 74°00′50″W

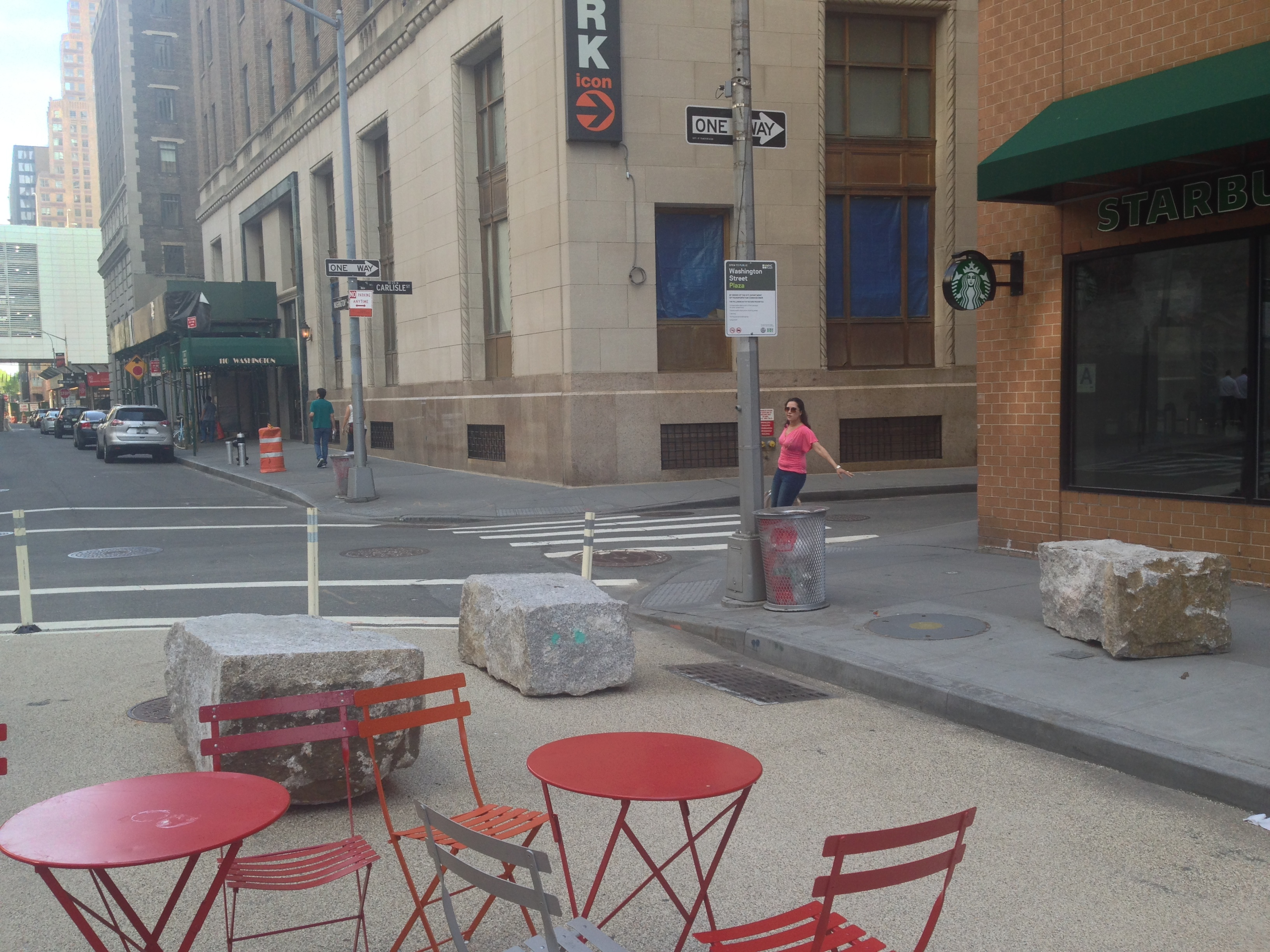
Washington Street Plaza

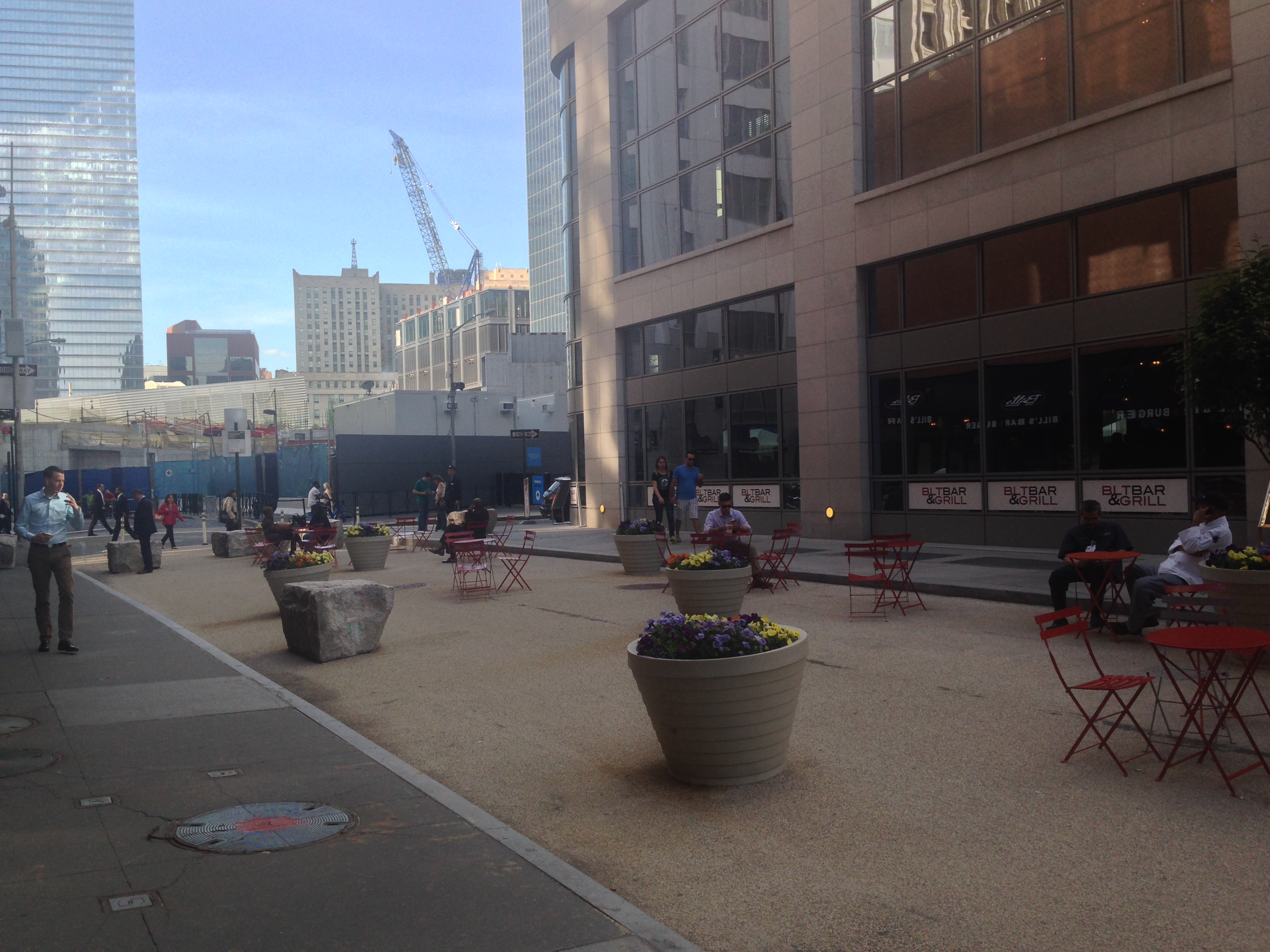
Washington Street Plaza at Albany and Washington Streets

The Washington Street Plaza was a pedestrian plaza along Washington Street between Carlisle and Albany Streets on the west side of the Financial District in Lower Manhattan. It opened on May 23, 2013.

With an epoxy gravel placed over the street, it contained granite blocks, red chairs, tables, and potted plants.

Its construction was delayed for several years and debated within Manhattan Community Board 1, although it was ultimately approved by the executive committee. The Alliance for Downtown New York, the Business Improvement District led by Elizabeth H. Berger, argued that the plaza would, according to the Downtown Express, "improve pedestrian mobility" around the September 11 Memorial and allow the Alliance to install a tourist kiosk. Referring to the Alliance's report "Five Principles for Greenwich South," which advocated for the plaza, she said: “One of the things that we looked at was how to capitalize on the old-world geometry of the street plan to create a sense of destination and gathering places.... There’ll be an attractive space not only for visitors but for people who live and work in the area to congregate.” Some residents believed, however, that "it would disrupt traffic and complicate an already crowded area."

The administration of former Mayor Michael Bloomberg, through Jeffrey Mandel, an adviser to Deputy Mayor Robert K. Steel, also advanced that the plaza would benefit residents of the Downtown neighborhood while helping to mitigate foot traffic from tourists. He said, "[the plaza] pushes a couple of big dominos forward by creating a place that's not just attractive and desirable for the folks down here but that has beneficial impacts in the way of mitigation."

The plaza's construction was delayed by Hurricane Sandy. Representing the exiting Bloomberg administration, Mandel said, "We think it's important to make our best efforts in our last hours in the neighborhood."

Activists for the recognition of the history of the Lower West Side and the Little Syria neighborhood have argued that the plaza would be an ideal place for historical signage. In anticipation of its construction, they pursued a resolution in support of signage from Community Board 1.
