= Little Syria, Manhattan =

Former Neighborhood in New York City

Little Syria سوريا الصغيرة
- Former Neighborhood in Manhattan
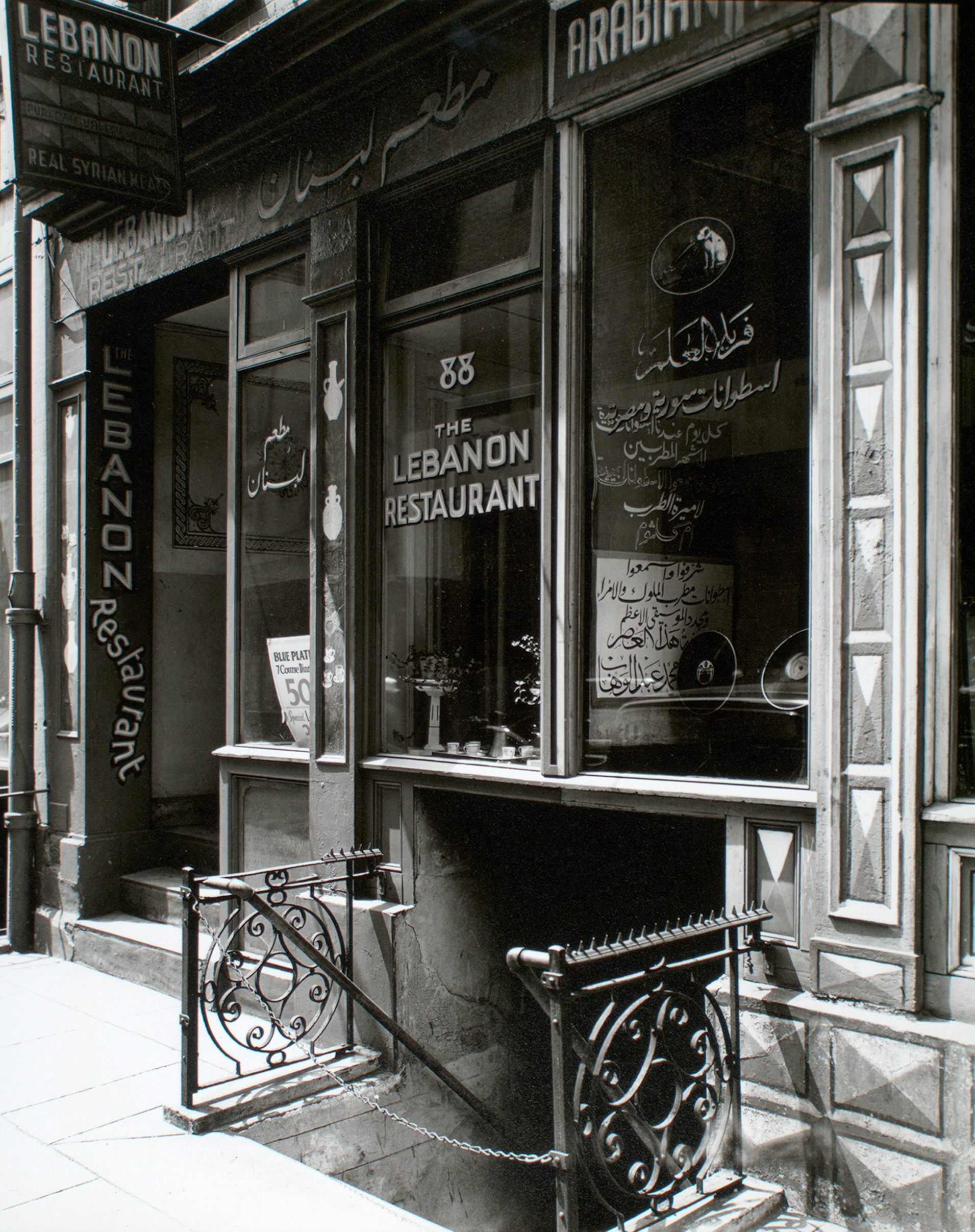
- Lebanon Restaurant, 88 Washington Street, Manhattan (1936)
- Interactive map of Little Syria
- Coordinates: 40°42′29″N 74°00′50″W
- Country: United States
- State: New York
- City: New York City
- Borough: Manhattan
- Community District: Manhattan 1
- ZIP Code: 10280
- Area codes: 212, 332, 646, and 917

Little Syria (Arabic: سوريا الصغيرة) was a diverse neighborhood that existed in the New York City borough of Manhattan from the late 1880s until the 1940s. The name for the neighborhood came from the Arabic-speaking Christian population who emigrated from Ottoman Syria, an area which today includes the nations of Lebanon, Syria, Jordan, Israel, and Palestine. Also called the Syrian Quarter, or Syrian Colony in local newspapers it encompassed a few blocks reaching from Washington Street in Battery Park to above Rector Street. This neighborhood became the center of New York's first community of Arabic-speaking immigrants. In spite of this name the neighborhood was never exclusively Syrian or Arab, as there were also many Irish, German, Slavic, and Scandinavian immigrant families present.

The neighborhood declined as the inhabitants began moving out to other areas, Brooklyn Heights, the Sunset Park area and Bay Ridge, with many shops relocating to Atlantic Avenue, in Brooklyn. The community disappeared almost entirely when a great deal of lower Washington Street was demolished to make way for the entrance ramps to the Brooklyn-Battery Tunnel. The quarter was located at the southern edge of the site that would become the World Trade Center. After the September 11 terrorist attacks, the cornerstone of the Syrian St. Joseph's Maronite Church was found in the rubble.

== History ==
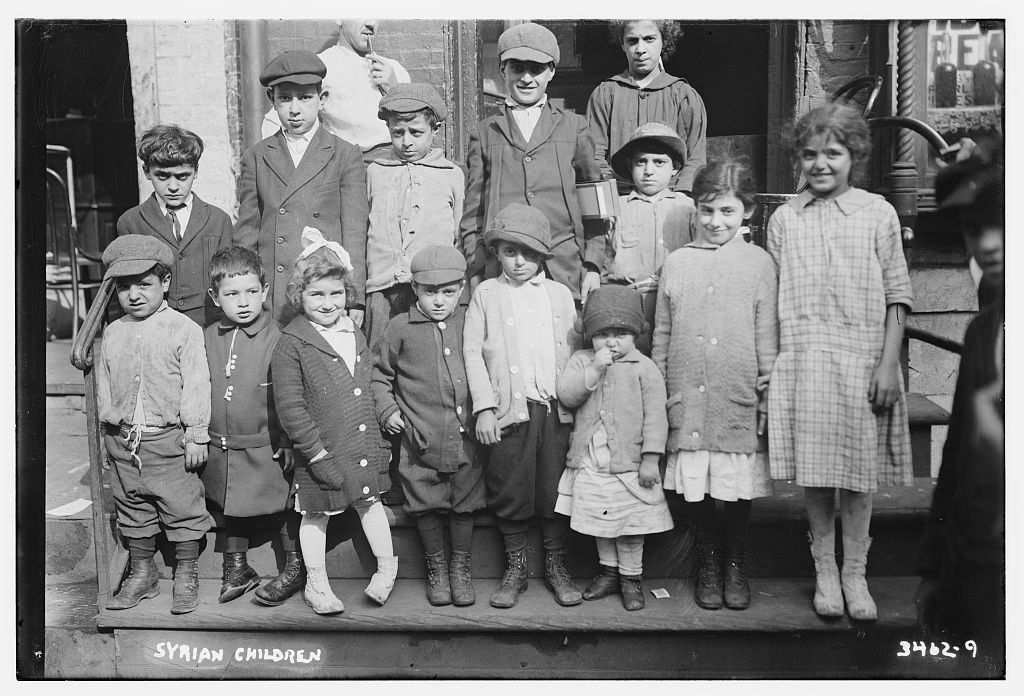
Syrian-American children in Little Syria (1910–15)

=== Early years ===
The earliest Syrians migrants to arrive in the United States were nearly all men, who came as Presbyterian seminarians between the 1830s and 1880s. Many were converts as a result of the American Protestant mission in Syria and only remained in the U.S. for a few years to complete their studies before returning home. The first wave of permanent Syrian immigrants arrived in Manhattan through the Castle Garden landing docks and registration depot by the start of the 1880s. These were mostly rural Christian merchants from the Mount Lebanon area in Ottoman Syria. The majority of these Christians belonged to the Melkite, Maronite, and Eastern Orthodox denominations, with a few Protestants, who had fled Greater Syria due to religious persecution and poverty following the French intervention after the 1860 Syrian Civil War. During this conflict between the Arab Christian and Druze populations, many militias ended up killing several thousands civilians across the Mount Lebanon area and Damascus. In addition, disruptions to the local silk trade caused by the influx of international competition following the opening of the Suez Canal in 1869 lead many merchants to leave for port cities across Africa, Latin America, and North America, with Manhattan being one. It is estimated that only 5-10% of the area's Arab residents were Muslims, mostly coming from the area around present day Israel. This included a minority of Druze, which although a distinct ethnoreligious community in the Levant, are often counted as Muslim.

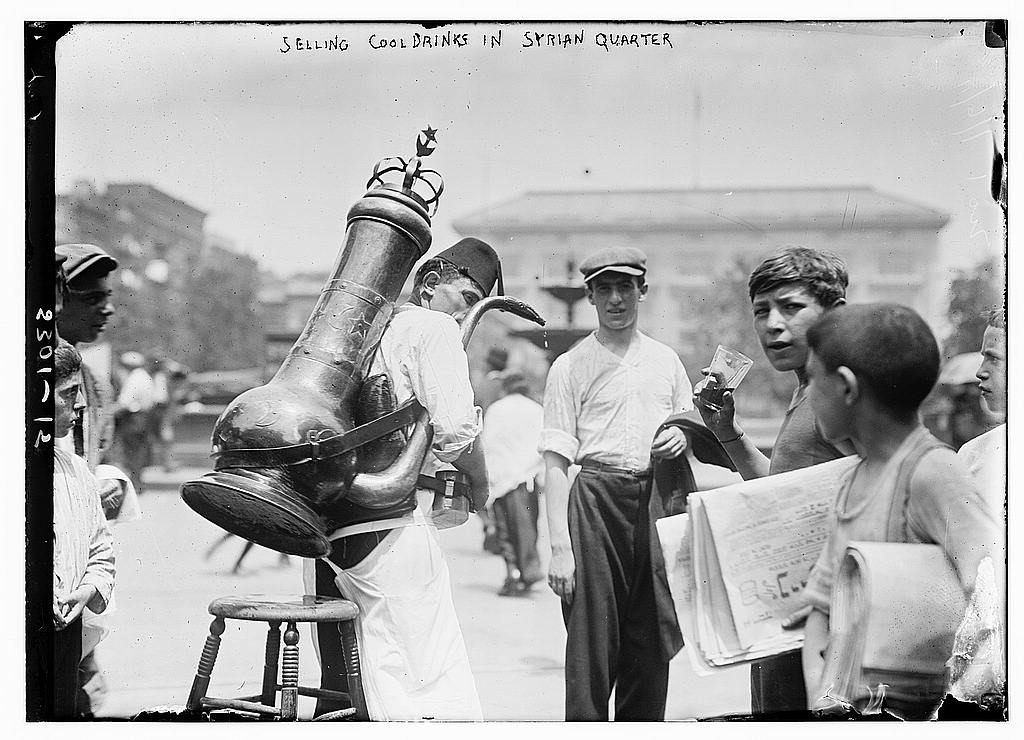
Cool drinks peddler in Little Syria (1910–15)

In New York City many immigrants worked as pack peddlers. They would often carry forty to eighty pounds of notions, which they would sell uptown during the day and further afield in upstate New York during the summer. Other peddlers sold luxury goods and religious objects such as damask cloth, embroideries, rosaries and crosses made from olive wood from the Holy Land. In order to maintain this constant flow of these goods many Syrians also started import-export businesses in order to sell directly to these peddlers. Many women worked as peddlers as well, mainly selling sundry goods, however they also labored as seamstresses, mill workers, factory workers, and entrepreneurs in their own right. Marie el-Khoury, a prominent jewelry designer, was one of the most successful Syrian-born business owners in the city. Originally trained as a jeweler under her father, she moved the business from its original location on the boardwalk in Atlantic City, New Jersey to Manhattan after his death. Little Syria was the original location of Sahadi's, which opened in the 1890s on Washington Street.

The Christians in the neighborhood mainly lived on Washington Street, to the south of the site of the World Trade Center, where they established three churches, including St. Nicolas Syrian Orthodox congregation and St. George Chapel of the Melkite Greek Catholic Church, which as of 2010 survives as Moran's Ale House and Grill, and which was designated a New York City Landmark in 2009.

=== Anti-Arab sentiment and community response ===
In reaction to the emergence of this new community nativist sentiments against Syrians began to be published in local papers such as Harper’s Weekly and the New York Times as early as May 1882. Over the years, several reports were published which called the Syrian peddlers "dirty Arabs from Mount Lebanon", quoted an immigration officer who said the Arab immigrants "were educated to steal” as they came from "the landing of thieving Arabs", and stirred up fears that "the Syrian Arabs from the Lebanon range have undertaken to invade the United States". This was spite of the fact that there were less than one thousand Syrians in Manhattan at the time. Over the years nearly 125,000 Syrians eventually immigrated to the United States, settling across the mainland United States, Alaska, and Hawaii. In 1899 an article about the Syrian Quarter and its 3,000 residents described how the immigrants arriving there didn't "leave all their quaint customs, garments, ways of thinking at home," nor did they become "ordinary American citizens," but instead "just enough of their traits, dress, ideas remain, no matter how long they have been here, to give the colonies they form spice and a touch of novelty." Noting "a number of amazingly pretty girls," the reporter described Little Syria near the turn of the 20th century as a mix of social classes.

In reaction to this many immigrants such as Philip K. Hitti, attempted to use Americans who praised Syrians; such as Louise Houghton, who published a four-part series titled "Syrians in America" in the Survey, to change the public perception of these immigrants. Houghton maintained that "Syrian immigrants appreciated liberty, kept clean homes, and obeyed the law". In his book, The Arab Americans: A History, writer Gregory Orfalea describes playwright Henry Chapman Ford's view of Syrian-Americans by quoting that, "Their family life, their clean way of living impressed me and I decided that the Americanization of such a race was a big factor in making the "melting pot" one of the greatest nations of history". An 1895 New York Times article mentions that Syrians are fond of "water, trees, and flowers and perhaps one great reason that keeps the Syrian Colony in the lower part of Washington Street".

However, Houghton's report was in spite of the fact that at this time many immigrants lived in squalor in multi-family tenements as noted by immigrant Abraham Mitrie Rihbany, during his time working and living in the Syrian Colony. Hitti was also notorious for cherry picking details and findings in order to foster the assimilation of Syrian immigrants and further promote their acceptance by the American populace by erasing any divisive findings. Hitti even went on to obscure anti-Syrian prejudice, and government backed studies such as the a 1901 report by the Industrial Commission that noted that Syrians lacked a strong worth ethic.

=== Arab American literary scene ===
Lebanese-Americans Ameen Rihani, Naoum Mokarzel, and, the Boston raised, Kahlil Gibran were among the first cultural luminaries that called Little Syria home, with the other cultural, educational, and journalistic minds. It was in Little Syria the linotype machine was first modified to produce Arabic characters, which transformed Arabic language journalism. The first Arabic-language periodicals in North America were all printed in New York, the first being Kawkab America in 1892. Kawkab America was established by the brothers Nageeb and Dr. Abraham J. Arbeely, Syrian immigrants who settled in Tennessee. The Arbeely were one of the first Syrian families to immigrate to the U.S., Nageeb Arbeely was even made the American consul to Jerusalem by President Grover Cleveland and worked as an immigration inspector at Ellis Island. Kawkab America mainly had an Orthodox Christian readership and was edited for a time by the theologian Abraham Mitrie Rihbany, a Lebanese Presbyterian convert who came from a family belonging to the Greek Orthodox Church of Antioch. Later, over 50 Arabic-language periodicals came to be published out of the neighborhood, including Al-Hoda. There were also the English-language The Syrian World which aimed at the first generation of Syrian-Americans who grew up or were born in the United States.

== Legacy ==
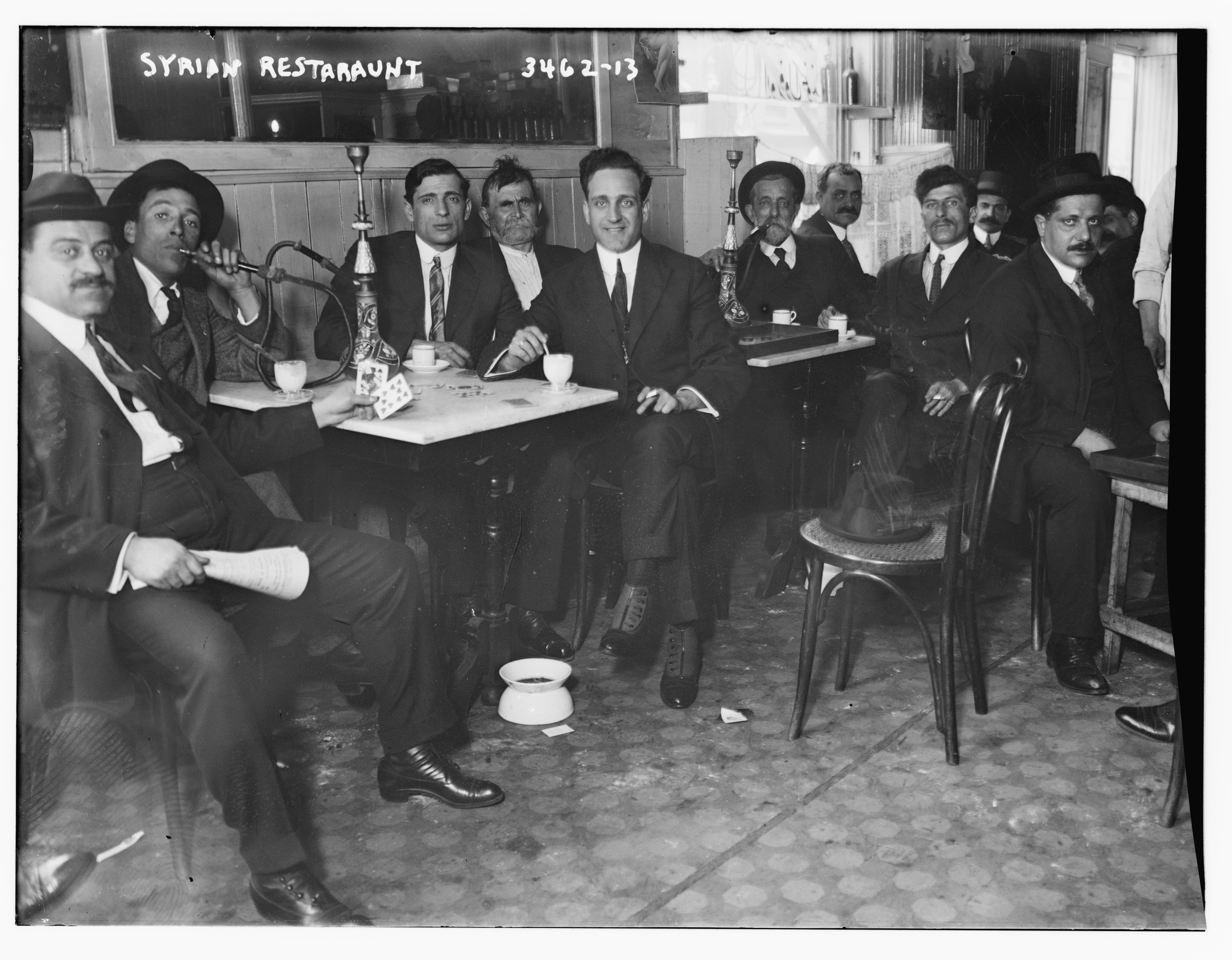
Patrons of a Syrian restaurant playing cards and smoking hookah (1910)

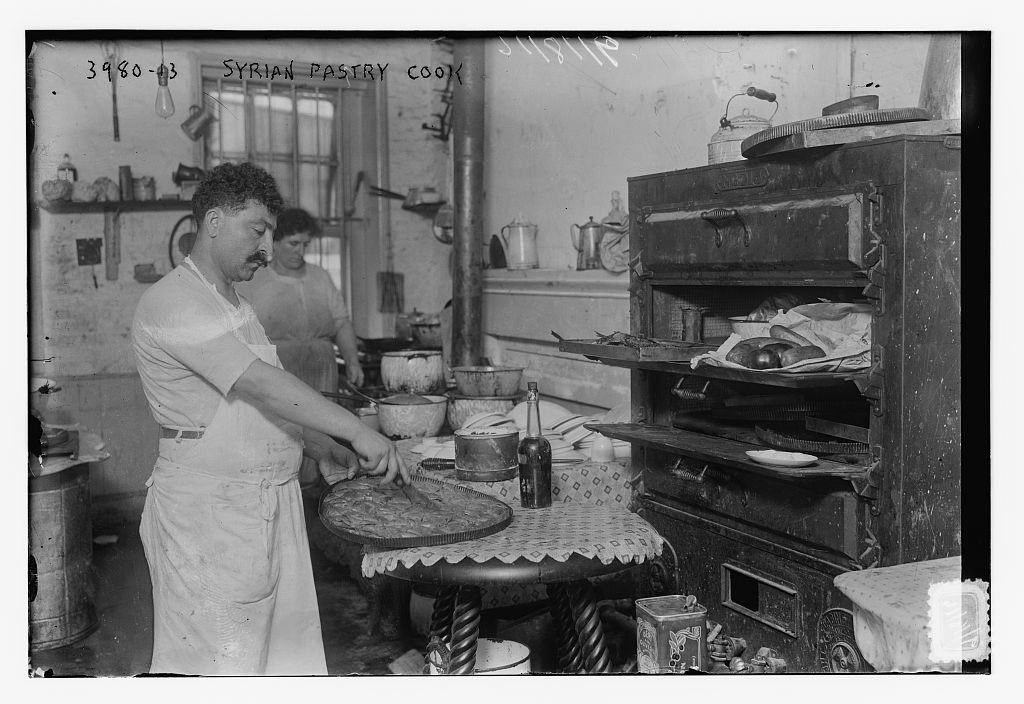
Syrian baklava chef (1916)

In his 2006 book The Arab Americans, Gregory Orfalea described Little Syria as "an enclave in the New World where Arabs first peddled goods, worked in sweatshops, lived in tenements and hung their own signs on stores." Naoum and Salloum Mokarzel created the publication Al-Hoda, adapting the Linotype machine to produce text in the Arabic alphabet, which "made possible and immeasurably stimulated the growth of Arabic journalism in the Middle East." By 1935 the influx of Syrian immigrants declined, following the folding of D. J. Faour and Bros, the first Syrian-owned bank and a few years after The Syrian World closed in 1932. By August 1946, residents and business owners on the stretch of Washington Street from Rector Street to Battery Place in what was then the "heart of New York's Arab world" had received condemnation notices, just years before the neighborhood was razed to create entrance ramps needed for the Brooklyn–Battery Tunnel, which opened in 1950.

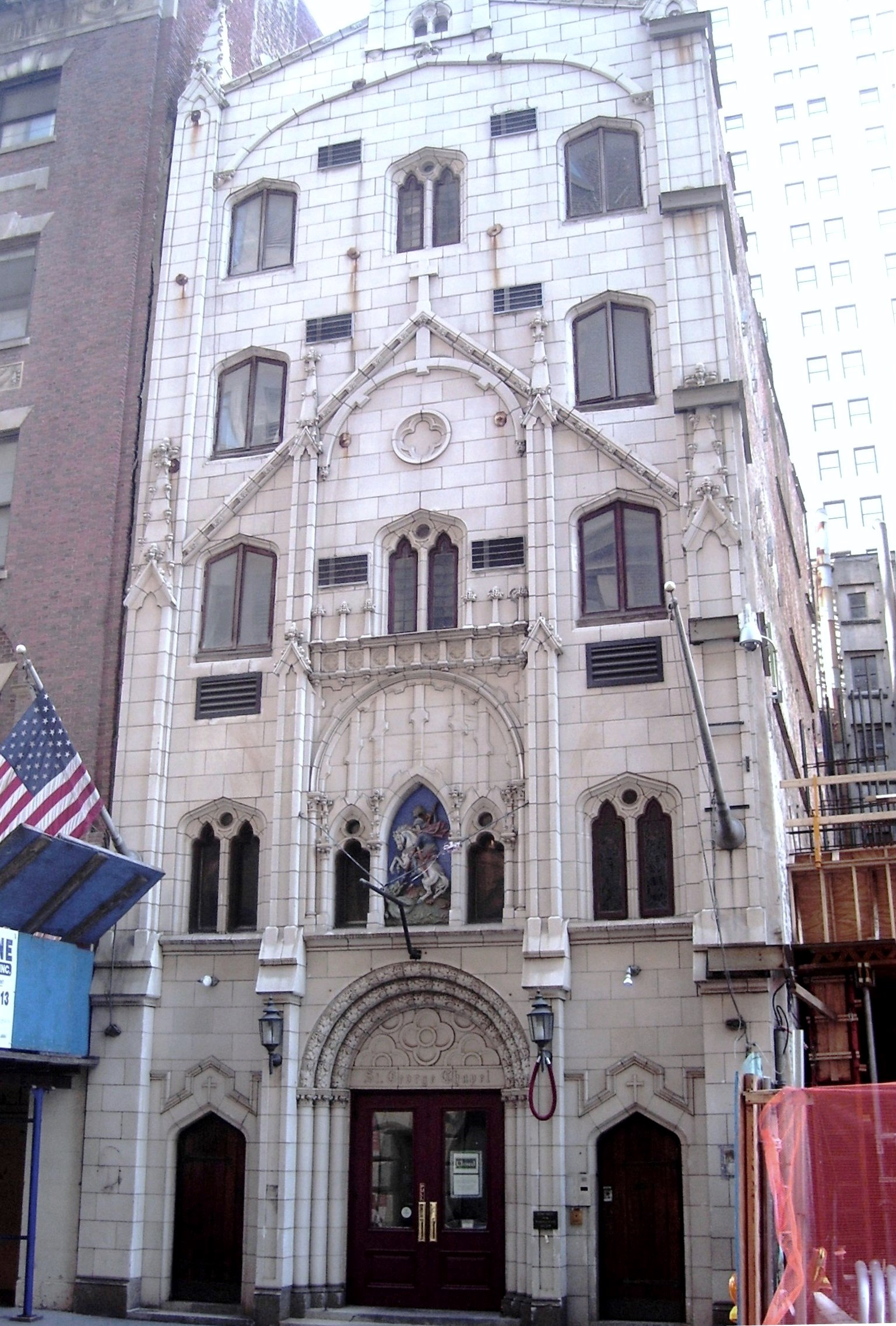
St. George's Syrian Catholic Church, one of the only physical relics of Little Syria.

A public park at the junction of Trinity Place, Greenwich Street and Edgar Street, the Elizabeth H. Berger Plaza honors the history of the former neighborhood through interpretive plaques and signs. In 2011, a collection of historic preservationists and Arab-American activists, under the "Save Washington Street" campaign, lobbied the Landmarks Preservation Commission and its chairman, Robert Tierney, to designate the Downtown Community House and the tenement at 109 Washington Street in Little Syria as city landmarks. Then, in 2019, the Washington Street Advocacy Group published a report by its president, Todd Fine, "Voluntary Destruction: Historic Preservation in the Lower West Side since September 11, 2001". Among other things, the report urged that the Community House and the tenement be preserved as among the last remaining vestiges of Little Syria, with St. George's Syrian Catholic Church having already been designated an individual landmark. A proposal for a "mini historic district" has been put before the Landmarks Preservation Commission, in response to what is being referred to as a "landmarks emergency".

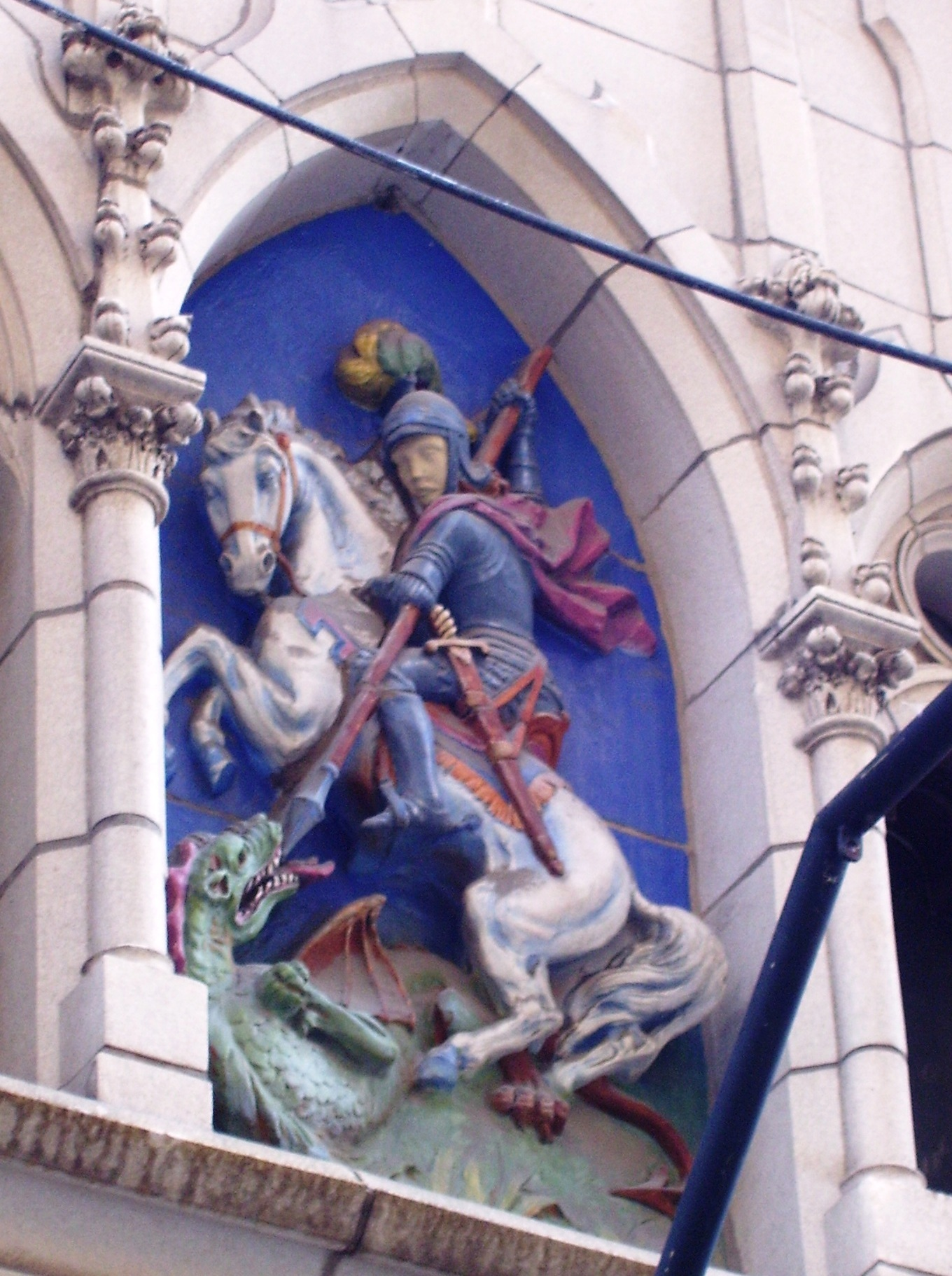
St. George's Syrian Catholic Church frieze

The 2016 book Strangers in the West, addresses the early years of the formation of the community, from 1880 to 1900, provides the names and occupations of the early immigrants to the area and their backgrounds, and the history of the neighborhood's growth. It includes multiple discussions of issues faced by the immigrants, including the development of journalism, medical care, educational institutions, legal cases, and the contributions of the 1893 Chicago World's Fair on the rapid expansion of the area and its popularity in New York City. The neighborhood is a setting in the 2013 novel The Golem and the Jinni by Helene Wecker.

== See also ==
- Syrian American
- Lebanese American
- Syrian Americans in New York City
- Naoum Mokarzel
- Marie el-Khoury
- Abraham Mitrie Rihbany
- Kahlil Gibran
- Ameen Rihani
- Nageeb Arbeely
