= West Village Houses =

Buildings in Manhattan, New York

Coordinates: 40°44′02.4″N 74°00′30.8″W

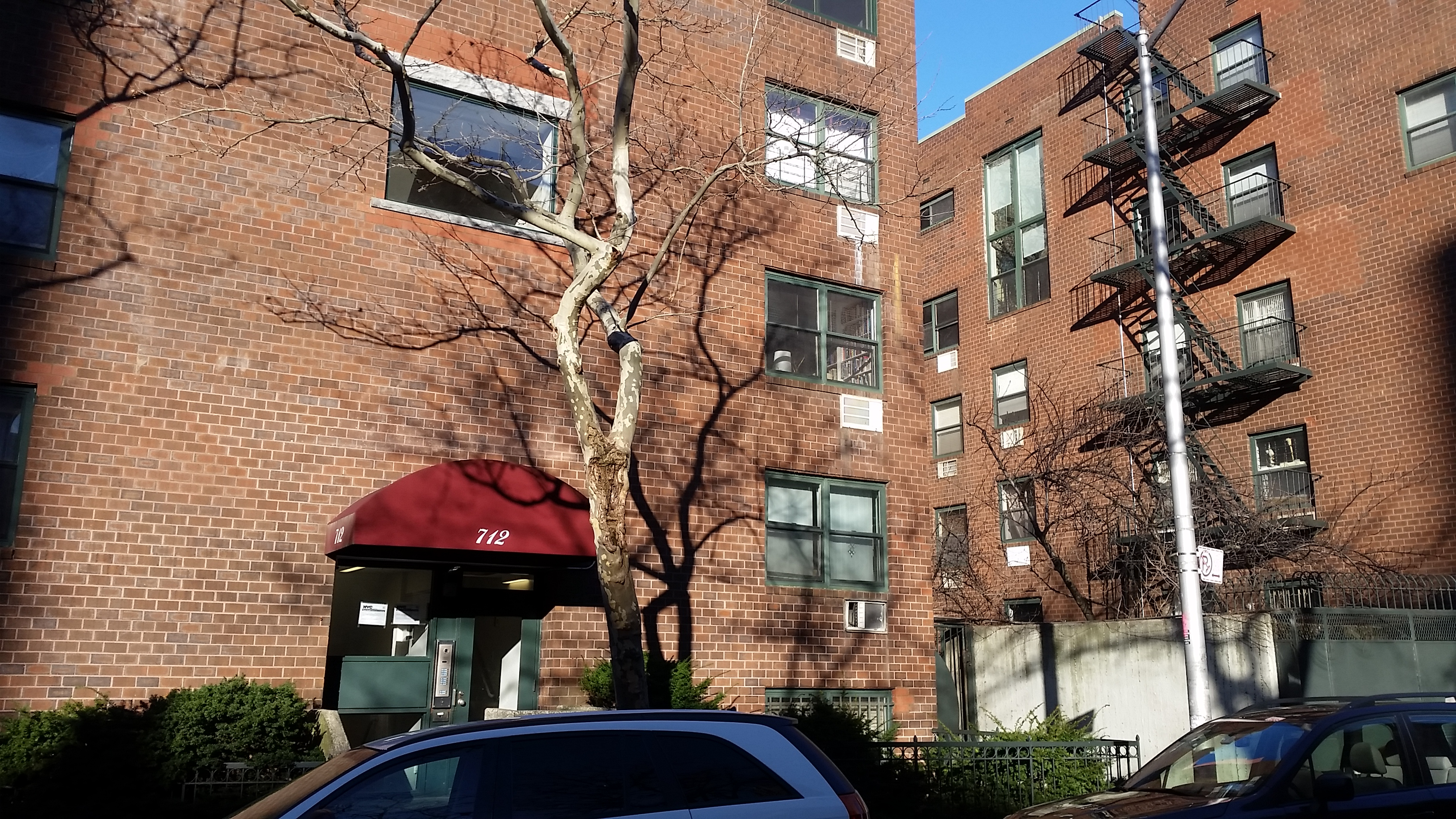
712 Washington St, one of the many West Village Houses buildings

The West Village Houses are a collection of 42 walk-up buildings in New York City's West Village that contain 420 apartments. They were built with the support of New York City and New York State through its Mitchell-Lama Housing Program. They were championed by Jane Jacobs and intended to be built on a human scale in keeping with her ideals.

== History ==
The houses are scattered in an area bounded by Morton, West, Bank and Washington Streets. In 1961, New York Mayor Wagner planned to redevelop that area with high rise housing. West Village resident Jane Jacobs led an effort to stop that development in favor of the West Village Houses which were smaller-scale and preserved existing structures. Perkins and Will designed the buildings. The effort to build the houses was finally approved in 1969, higher costs required a second approval in 1972 and then construction began. Because of their long construction during a period of high inflation, when they were completed in 1975 common charges for prospective residents were high, they had difficulty finding residents and required further subsidy.

In 2002 the owner of the property, the Island Capital Group, indicated that it might like to buy out of the Mitchell-Lama Program and convert the units to market rate. In 2006 the Bloomberg administration worked out an arrangement to sell the units to the tenants via the Housing Development Fund Corporation which allowed tenants to buy their properties at below market rates, limit the amount of profit they could make on a resale, and enjoy a tax abatement for twelve years. As the date of the abatement expiration approached, developer Madison Equities offered to purchase the properties and redevelop them as high rises but the tenants chose to convert the properties to market rate cooperatives and completed the transaction in June 2020. It was the first conversion of Michell-Lama properties to market rate in New York.
