= 101 Warren Street =

Residential skyscraper in Manhattan, New York

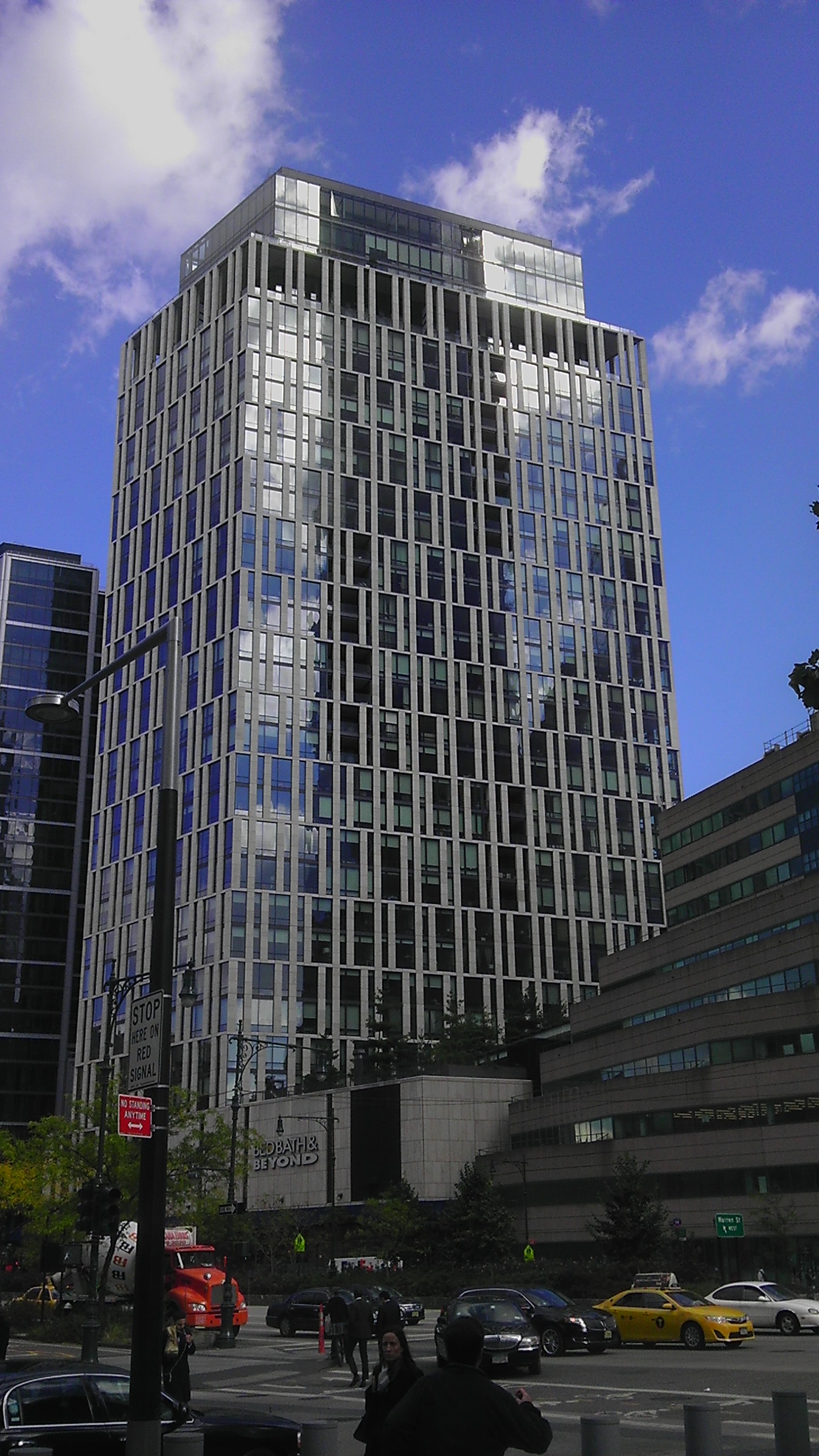
- South side of 101 Warren St, seen from Murray and West Streets

General information
- Location: Manhattan, New York City, New York, United States
- Coordinates: 40.715626°N 74.011178°W
- Construction started: 2006
- Completed: 2008

Height
- Height: 428 feet (130 m)

Technical details
- Floor count: 32 above ground, 2 below ground

Design and construction
- Architecture firm: Skidmore, Owings & Merrill

101 Warren Street (also known as 270 Greenwich Street) is a 35-story apartment building in the Tribeca neighborhood of Lower Manhattan, New York City, between Greenwich Street and West Street. The project was developed by Edward J. Minskoff Equities, designed by Skidmore Owings & Merrill, and completed in 2008. It consists of 227 condominiums and 163 rental units.

101 Warren Street was designed with a distinctive, elongated "checkerboard" facade. It contains a Whole Foods Market, and it housed a Barnes & Noble until 2023. Its double-height lobbies have murals by Roy Lichtenstein, while the fifth floor contains an "Artrium" with a pine tree forest consisting of 101 trees.

An earlier building at 101 Warren Street, the Tarrant Building, was destroyed by an explosion and fire in October 1900. The Mattlage Building, a 12-story office building, was later built at the site and numbered as 97–101 Warren Street. In 1942, the building was sold by a person or company identified as "Irving". It was announced in 1951 that the building would be auctioned off. In 1957, Office Structure bought the building. By August 2001, an office building was being proposed for the two blocks bounded by West, Greenwich, Warren, and Murray Streets; at the time, one block of Washington Street still ran from Warren to Murray Street. 101 Warren Street was being developed on the site by 2006, and was finished by 2008. In October 2015, the building's condominium board sued Edward J. Minskoff Equities over construction quality, claiming that the Whole Foods Market's exhaust fans had killed the building's trees.
