= Downtown Community House =

Building in New York City

Coordinates: 40.7084°N 74.0141°W

The Downtown Community House at 105-107 Washington Street is a six-story, five-bay red brick building that is among the last vestiges of the Lower West Side of Manhattan's former life as an ethnic neighborhood known as "Little Syria." From the time of its establishment, the Bowling Green Neighborhood Association, housed in the Downtown Community House beginning in 1926, was a pioneering organization that served the local immigrant population as a settlement house and continued to provide services for the area well after the community house became defunct. Built in 1925 with philanthropic funds from William H. Childs, the founder of the Bon Ami household cleaner company, the Downtown Community House was designed by John F. Jackson, architect of over 70 Y.M.C.A. buildings and community centers, and through its Colonial Revival style speaks to an underlying desire for the neighborhood's immigrant population to become Americanized and associate themselves with the country's foundations. In recent years, a collection of historic preservationists and Arab-American activists have lobbied the Landmarks Preservation Commission and its chairman Robert Tierney to designate the building as a city landmark.

== Early history ==
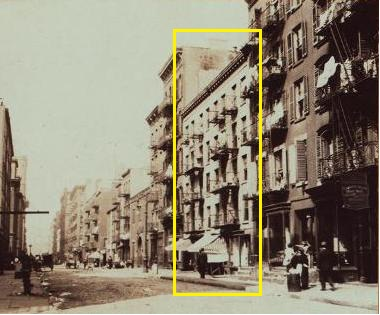
Two early tenements on the lot that were replaced in 1926 by the Downtown Community House

The community house located at 105-107 Washington Street was completed in 1926; prior to its construction, the lot was separated in two, with two early residential buildings (as Kate Reggev has speculated, perhaps a single-family house with both front and rear buildings) constructed sometime prior to 1822. One of 107 Washington Street's early residents was Samuel Healy, a money broker, who had an office nearby on Greenwich Street. By the 1860s, both tenements were boarding houses used by Irish immigrants and sailors from the nearby piers, and No. 105 had a saloon on the ground floor. The area, because of its proximity to the wharves, was often recorded as the scene of fights, shootings, and other crimes; an inspection of No. 105 Washington Street in 1894 described it as a "five-story front and four-story rear tenement... The Inspector found the houses to be dirty, poorly ventilated, and the stairways considerably worn." By 1896, both structures were condemned by the Board of Health, and the tenements were vacated until 1897 when they were remodeled and considered fit for human habitation. Residents, including recently arrived Syrian immigrants, returned to the tenements and the storefronts continued to be occupied to serve the local community – the ground floor of 107 Washington Street had an Italian restaurant called Ferrintino Signorgro's in 1908. In 1920, the two tenements were purchased by a realty corporation from Mrs. Schroen of Reno, Nevada, who had the property in her family for over fifty years. In 1925, the property was purchased for the construction of the Downtown Community House to contain the Bowling Green Neighborhood Association.

== Opening ==
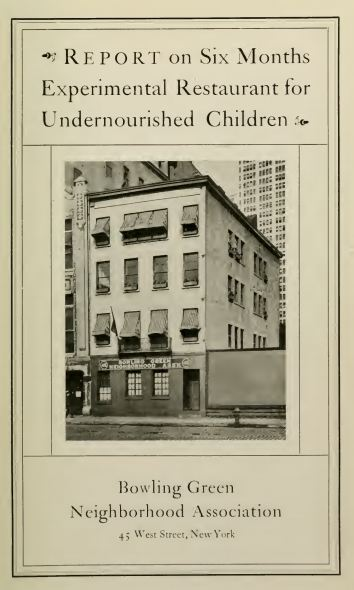
Report on Six Months Experimental Restaurant for Undernourished Children. New York: Bowling Green Neighborhood Association, 1920

The Bowling Green Neighborhood Association was formed in 1915 as an affiliate of the New York Milk Committee and had its first residence at the Bowling Green Community House at 45 West Street. At its inception, it was primarily devoted to children's work, but over time also created services for adults, with a focus on education and health; the Association had a medical and dental clinic and sponsored folk dances, fund-raisers for special holidays, and English classes for over fourteen nationalities in hopes of working to "weld together the peoples of the many nations in the Bowling Green neighborhood," according to news articles from 1922 to 1925. The Association described the neighborhood in 1922 as having an infant mortality rate that was twice the rate of the average of all of New York City and a death rate of tuberculosis that was four times the average in New York; they described the area as "the first, cheapest, and most convenient home for a motley immigration of Italians, Greeks, Turks, Armenians, Syrians, Slavs and Poles." In the late 1910s and early 1920s, Bowling Green Neighborhood Association was one of the only health clinics or dispensaries serving the downtown Manhattan residential community.

The Bowling Green Association also published annual reports of both the current conditions and of their successes in "Wall Street's backyard," announcing a decrease in infant mortality rates in Bowling Green by two-thirds between 1910 and 1924, a decline in the death rate in the area by 1923 of 14.5%, and the daily attendance of 400 people to their playground. The Association's Health Center, equipped with four doctors and a part-time dentist, carried out pioneering medical studies, documenting the eating habits and improved health of the neighborhood's children when given adequate nutritional options, treating thousands of patients. In 1919, the Health Center had provided 1,801 physicians visits, 4,579 nurses visits, and had an annual attendance of 3,447; infant mortality was reduced from 321 to 175 per thousand.

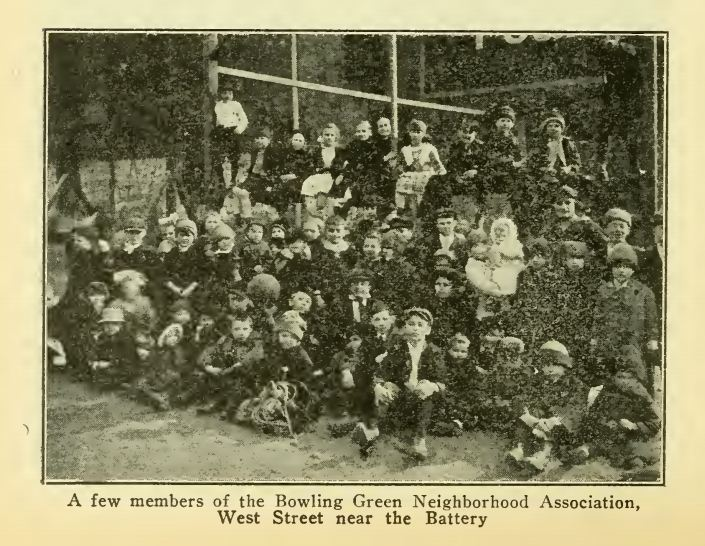
Picture of Members of the Bowling Green Neighborhood Association by Henry Collins Brown in Valentine's City of New York: A Guidebook, 1920

In 1917, after the publication of their second annual report, which received a special recommendation from the Mayor and other city officials, the Police Commissioner at the time, Arthur Woods, said that the Bowling Green Neighborhood Association had, "in the brief space of two years... developed a successful model program for community organization... that can, with profit, be studied by other social forces." Their 1918 experimental study, in which three meals a day were provided to neighborhood immigrant children for a period of six months, aimed to instruct parents in the proper nutrition and feeding of children. These significant accomplishments, in particular the nutrition study, were well known in New York and often published in newspapers and medical and health journals, as well as Henry Collin Brown's Valentine’s City of New York: A Guidebook.

Along with medical concerns, sanitary living conditions were also of the utmost importance to the Bowling Green Neighborhood Association. Workers at the Downtown Community House were constantly on the lookout for unsanitary or unacceptable housing conditions, which they would subsequently report to the social worker in charge of building incidents; he would then notify the owner or agency of the building before informing the government agency of the situation. Two weeks after the complaint was recorded, the social worker would follow up on the case and send a letter to the head of the appropriate municipal department if the requested improvements were not made. This ultimately resulted in a complete housing survey of the area and significant improvements in housing in the neighborhood, sometimes to the point of buildings being torn down or completely remodeled.

In 1925, after years of campaigning for donations of money, toys, and food from the wealthy who worked on nearby Wall Street, William H. Childs, the founder of the Bon Ami powdered cleaner company, made a $250,000 donation to the Bowling Green Neighborhood Association with the promise of other Wall Street investors to double their annual donations to the cause. William Hamlin Childs (1857-1928), a native of Hartford, Connecticut, earned his fortune in the soap and detergent industry at the turn of the 20th century. His father, owner of a grist mill in Manchester, Connecticut, had leased the mill to John T. Robertson, a scientist who was experimenting with feldspar ground into a powder and mixing it with liquid soap to produce a gentle cleaning agent he called Bon Ami. Taking advantage of the prospering market of store-bought soap by housewives at the turn of the 20th century, William H. Childs and his cousin formed Childs and Childs and became the exclusive sales agents for Bon Ami, which by the 1890s was packaged in paper and stamped with the company logo, a yellow chick. By World War I, Bon Ami was being sold in powder form in cardboard cans throughout the globe, from Latin America to Europe. Even during the Great Depression, the cleaner continued to do well on the stock market, never reducing or failing to pay a dividend on the New York Stock Market. In the past thirty years, the powdered white cleanser, often used for cleaning kitchen sinks and bathtubs, has continued to fare well.

The popularity of Childs’ product made him a wealthy man in New York City, and he constructed a red brick and limestone Flemish Revival home in well-to-do Prospect Park, Brooklyn (Architect: William B. Tubby, 1901). It also enabled him to devote much of his free time and income to philanthropic pursuits; he was director and a significant contributor to the Beekman Street Hospital in New York City, chairman of the Brooklyn Bureau of Charity, President of the Battery Park Association, and Vice President of the Park Association of New York City. Through these charitable foundations and his reputation among wealthy New Yorkers, Childs was able to secure the promise of other Wall Street investors to double their annual donations for the construction of the Downtown Community House. With these pledges from Wall Street in 1925, the Neighborhood Association was able to extend its bounding limits to provide services to an estimated 10,000 people speaking twenty-five different languages as well as move to a new, larger space at 105-107 Washington Street, purchased in March 1925.

The new Downtown Community House, designed by architect John F. Jackson, opened on May 5, 1926 with two pageants, a play by children in local public schools explaining the development of New York from Henry Hudson’s discovery in 1609 through the opening of the community house, and a speech by Mayor Jimmy Walker. Patriotism and a feeling of pride in America and its history were apparent, and as Mayor Walker said, the Community House was “turning back the Bolsheviki, helping God and man, and making the Stars and Stripes brighter than ever.” Housing the first public library in Downtown Manhattan with an initial collection of 1,000 books, the building also contained clinics, a milk dispensary, assembly hall, cooking school, gymnasium, and a Roosevelt Memorial Nursery with furniture small enough for infants. Within the first year of its opening, the workers of the community house made over 10,570 visits, ranging from medical appointments, to the upkeep and maintenance of the local tenements, to assistance with obtaining working papers.

In the years following its opening, the Downtown Community House provided a wide range of medical, social, and occupational opportunities, including musicals, a drama club, classes in scientific housekeeping, and Christmas activities for the neighborhood children with music, dances, Christmas trees, and food baskets donated by wealthy sponsors and Wall Street corporations. In 1929, the Neighborhood Association conducted an occupational survey of the area's female population, discovering that over two-thirds of the 788 women surveyed were found to be scrubwomen, most over the age of 30, who worked long hours overnight in nearby office buildings on Wall Street at a wage of 50 cents per hour; the results of the survey were then used to establish free summer vacation camps for Lower Manhattan working women. The medical center continued to be a vital resource to the community, providing over 1,500 schoolchildren with dental care in 1926 and 1,400 in 1928; in only one month in 1930, 1,041 visits to 535 people were made, with a total attendance of 3,774 at the health center. Community activities during the Great Depression included plays directed by out-of-work locals, giving the unemployed men “something to work on during their enforced idleness.”

In 1930, after the death of the Association's president Chellis A. Austin, Guy Emerson, the vice president of Bankers Trust Co., was elected president. That same year, though, the Association's surveys showed a significant increase in skyscraper construction in the area, ultimately resulting in an 8 to 10% decrease in the area's population, and in 1940, the dramatic changes in the structure of the downtown communities, especially the decreasing population, led to the consolidation of the Bowling Green Neighborhood Association/Downtown Community House with the Beekman Street Hospital, today known as New York Downtown Hospital. In 1945, the Beekman-Downtown Hospital sold the property to Nathan Wilson for $183,000, with the proceeds of the sale, according to Kate Reggev, most likely used to establish an endowment or reserve fund for the Beekman-Downtown Hospital Building.

Despite the change of hands of the building, 105-107 Washington Street remained a resource in the neighborhood as a pioneering recreation and health center. In 1936, it became the Recreation & Training School or the Recreation Center for the Adult Physically Handicapped, sponsored by the Works Progress Administration. It was the first center devoted to the recreation and athletics of handicapped adults in the United States, “helping [its users] to overcome their so-called ‘inferiority complex’” and it offered classes in play leadership and techniques for “social adjustment” through community recreation such as arts and crafts, swimming, dancing, puppetry, sports, and story-telling. In 1943, the “modern six-story structure” formerly housing the Downtown Community House reopened as the War Shipping Administration and United Service, a government office for medical services for merchant seamen about to ship out or for those who would need recuperation after their return. In 1946, the WPA relinquished the property, and in the 1950s, it served as the headquarters of Local 88 of the International Organization of Masters, Mates and Pilots, a longshoremen union local chapter. It most recently housed the True Buddha Diamond Temple, but today stands vacant.

== Architect ==
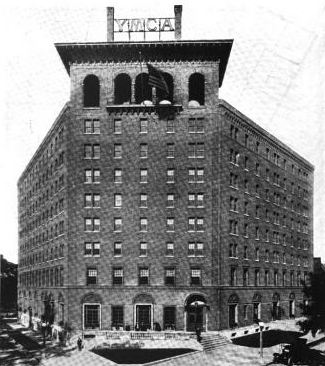
John F. Jackson-designed YMCA in Rochester, New York

The Downtown Community House was built with Childs’ funds for a total cost of $300,000 ($50,000 more than Childs’ original gift) by John F. Jackson (1867-1948), an architect who completed over 70 Y.M.C.A. buildings and neighborhood houses over the course of his career. Born in New Brunswick, Canada in 1867, Jackson moved to Buffalo, New York to complete his apprenticeship at the firm of Green & Wicks before moving to New York in 1901. He was a partner in two New York firms, Jackson, Rosencrans & Canfield and Jackson & Rosencrans before practicing alone in New York beginning in the 1920s and finally moving to Passaic, New Jersey six years before his death.

Jackson designed numerous Young Men's Christian Association buildings in New York including the Prospect Park Branch (1925), the Highland Park Branch (1925), and the Harlem 135th Street Branch (1918), as well as other community and youth centers in New York City, such as the Boys Club of New York at 321 East 111th Street (1926) and the Seaman's Branch of the Y.M.C.A. in Brooklyn (1921, not extant). Jackson's contributions extended beyond New York City as the architect of the Y.M.C.A. in Rochester (1919), Elmira (not extant), and Watertown (not extant), New York; Montreal (1911-1912), Halifax (1908, not extant), Ottawa (1908) and Winnipeg (1911), Canada; and Jersey City (1924) and Passaic (1924), New Jersey. Several of his plans, sketches, and drawings for these buildings were published in national architectural magazines; in 1922, The American Architect and the Architectural Review described his sketches for the proposed Y.M.C.A. building in Jersey City as “showing a finely developed artistic ability.” While describing a building of a grander scale and a larger budget than the Downtown Community House, the same sense of massing and design seen through the articulation of the different floors, the Flemish bond and limestone ornamentation, and the influence of Greek Revival detailing at the Y.M.C.A. in Jersey City is also seen at 105-107 Washington Street; from it, one also gets a sense of the original interiors that which might have existed at the Downtown Community House.

However prolific he was as a designer of community houses, Jackson's abilities were by no means limited to this form. He also designed the Calvary Baptist Church in Clifton, New Jersey (1924), the Methodist Church in Westfield, New Jersey (1928), and the Congregational Church in East Brookfield, Massachusetts. Jackson was also involved in residential architecture in New Jersey; he designed several homes in Passaic, including that of William H. Carey (1920), Judge W.W. Watson (1920), and Charles L. Denison (1920), all of which had images and plans published in American Architect. The architectural style of both his civic structures and his private residences was typically a mixture of Colonial Revival and Italian Renaissance details and ornament using red brick and limestone accents.

== Colonial Revival style ==
The Colonial Revival was a nationalistic architectural style that was popular in the United States from the end of the 19th century through the 1930s. Attempting to emulate and recall the designs of America's early history, the Colonial Revival stemmed from the restorations of the mid-19th century at Independence Hall, Mount Vernon, and Washington's headquarters at Newburgh as well as a newly founded sense of patriotism originating out of the 1876 Centennial celebration in Philadelphia. A popular style for residential architecture, the Colonial Revival took its precedents from the Georgian and Neoclassical architecture of the East Coast and England, roughly from 1720 to 1840, as well as Greek Revival influences, with defining characteristics such as symmetrical wood clapboard or Flemish-bond brick facades with elaborate front doors, crown or broken pediment entrances, fanlights, Palladian windows, gabled or mansard roofs, Classical-inspired details such as swag reliefs and urns, and dormer windows.

Patriotism played an important part both in the rediscovery of these buildings and in their subsequent emulation across the nation, in particular around the turn of the 20th century when the United States was experiencing a dramatic increase in immigrant population and desired to clarify and express American identity. Moreover, after the emotionally devastating World War I, the country was in need of a renewed sense of comfort, manifesting itself architecturally in the Colonial Revival, which evoked the past and was “not meant to overwhelm but to welcome.” Architectural magazines from the time also looked back to Colonial America for “inspiration for modern builders” and examined Colonial-era structures in each month's publication, believing there to be an inherent honesty and truth in this style that evoked the memories of the American past.

Although predominantly seen in residential buildings, Colonial Revival style became increasingly used throughout the United States for civic structures that served the poor, deprived, or newly arrived. Fiske Kimball, in a 1919 article on social centers in Architectural Record, suggested that community centers “do not have a standardized form of organization” because of their wide range of activities, but the Colonial Revival was a popular option for many of these centers partially because of the wide variety of decorative options and arrangements made possible by the style. More importantly, though, Colonial Revival was common for community and neighborhood houses precisely because of the way it physically expressed nationalistic and patriotic feelings to the nation's newcomers.

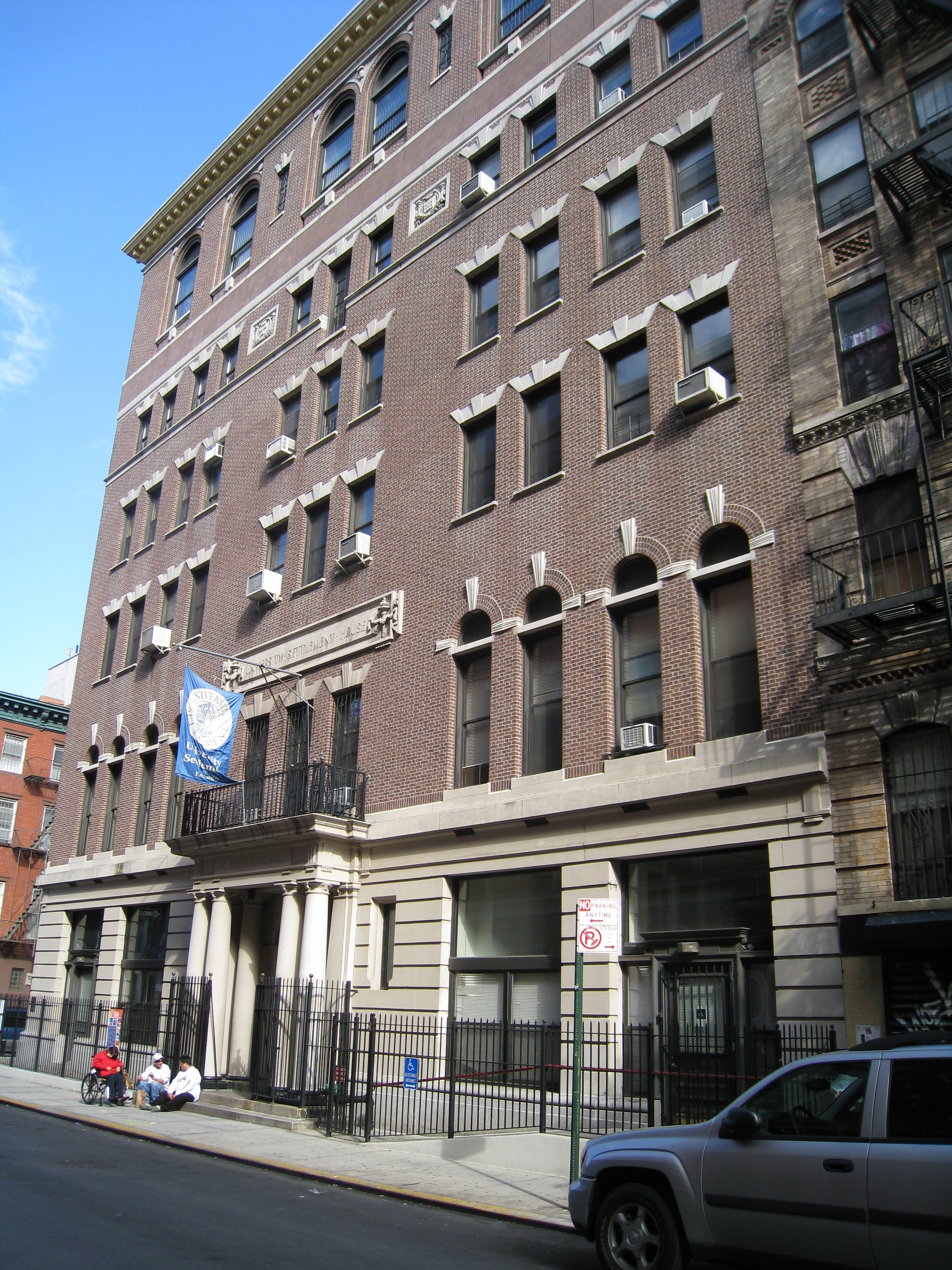
University Settlement House, located at 184 Eldridge Street, Manhattan, c. 2008

In the early 20th century when ethnic tensions ran high due to high immigration rates, most neighborhood, settlement, and community houses had a program of Americanization to assimilate users into American society. Architecture began to play an important part in the educational programs at many of these settlement houses, with classes on local history using prints and images of New Amsterdam and old New York. Tours were given to immigrant children of Colonial landmarks in New York, such as the Dyckman House, with the intention of moralizing the newcomers: “the very walls of the old Dutch house were said to present ‘our young citizens... [with a] living history of honest and upright life.’” This need to Americanize immigrants and provide them with a strong set of ethics extended beyond the programmatic schedules of these centers into the architectural language through the use of the Colonial Revival. By referencing forms, materials, and shapes from Colonial era in combination with showing the immigrants true “American” architecture, the aim was to visually articulate and define America and inform the newcomers of American history and patriotism. The Colonial Revival style was thus a physical expression as well as a physical extension of the assimilation process that occurred inside its doors.

While building styles were quite diverse in New York City in the 1880s through the 1930s, the Colonial Revival style was favored in particular for community and neighborhood houses, such as the well-known University Settlement House (1901, Howells and Stokes) and Greenwich House (1917, Delano & Aldrich). The University Settlement House, originally known as the Neighborhood Guild, is a six-story, red brick building with a prominent entrance flanked by two Corinthian columns and a limestone base, belt courses, inset plaques, and projecting window lintels. The tall arched windows on the second floor diminish in size to smaller windows on the upper stories, with a final band of arched windows on the sixth floor capped with a Greek Revival cornice. The Greenwich House, a settlement house founded in the West Village in 1901, served the needs of its largely Italian community in its Colonial Revival seven-story, red brick building with painted shutters, a steep gabled roof, and dormer windows. Other community houses designed in the Colonial Revival style are found throughout the country in particular in urban areas, including the Chicago Orphan Asylum Building (later the Parkway Community House; Chicago, Shepley, Rutan and Coolidge, 1898-1899) and the William Hale House (Chicago, Argyle Robinson, 1908), as well as other red brick and limestone trim community and youth centers such as the Philadelphia University House (1907) and South Bay Union in Boston.

== Design ==
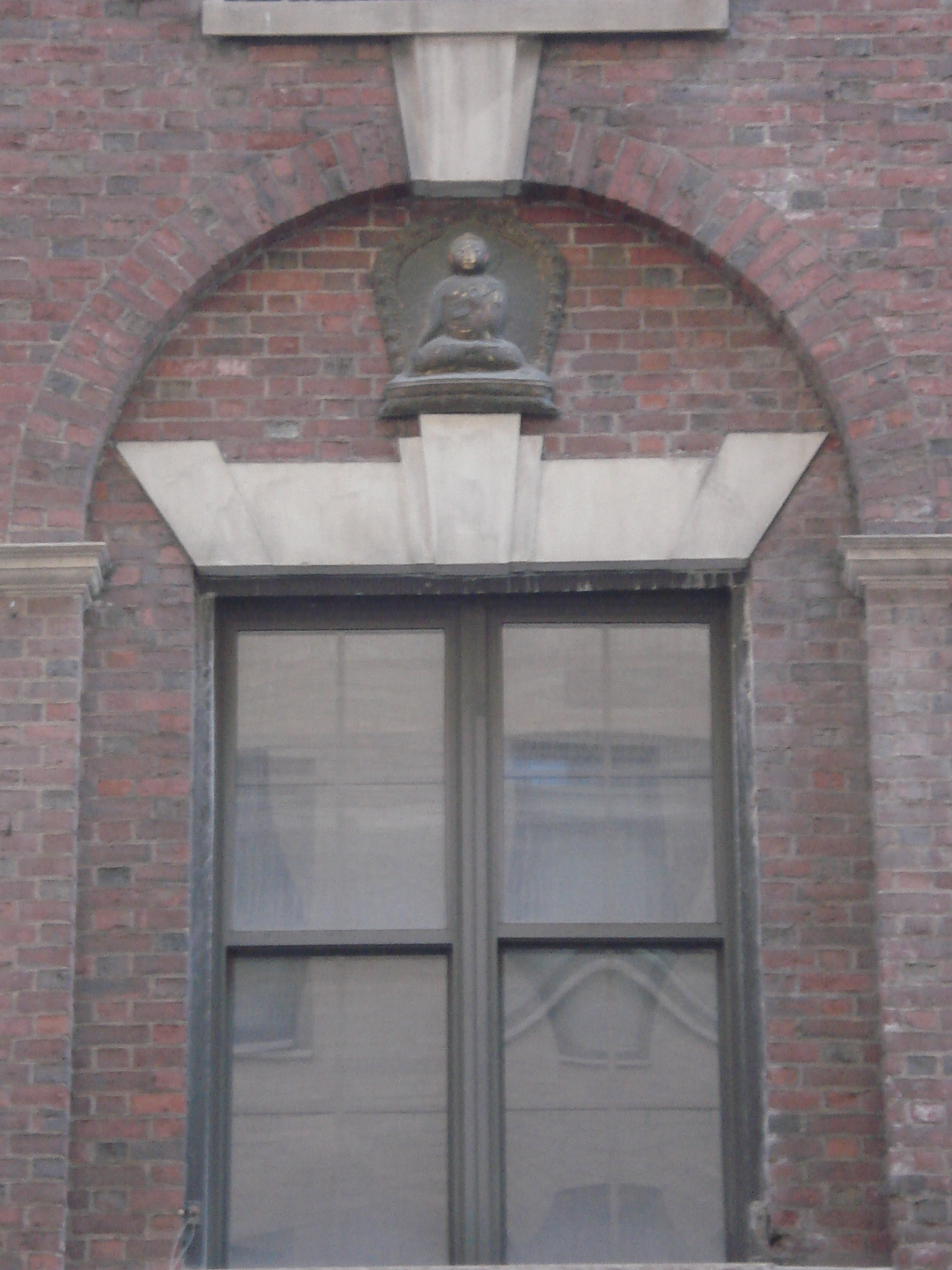
A small relief ornament of Buddha was placed above the second-story windows when the building was occupied as a Buddhist temple.

The five-bay, six-story red brick building at 105-107 Washington Street was designed in the Colonial Revival style with a granite base, limestone first floor, limestone window lintels with projecting keystones, stone plaques between each floor, arched window surrounds on the second floor, and a slate mansard roof with metal-framed dormer windows. The eagle and swag plaques above the third story windows, along with the swag relief details in the cornice frieze and the Flemish bond, hearken back to the early buildings of the United States. The articulation of the windows, beginning with large, arched window frames on the second floor, become smaller and less decorative on each successive story, but still employ the sense of "good proportions" and the correct "proportion of voids to solids" that Jackson described as appropriate for Y.M.C.A. community houses in a 1911 article for a Y.M.C.A. publication, Association Men. The swag details, seen on other neo-Classical and Colonial Revival structures by John F. Jackson such as the Prospect Park branch Y.M.C.A., are proportionally appropriate for a six-story building, while the eagle relief in the limestone plaques in particular emphasizes the patriotism evident in the Colonial Revival style.

The original windows on the building were three-over-three double-hung windows with painted white frames, with smaller two-over-two windows on the dormer windows on the sixth story. The main entrance is flanked by two fluted pilasters and crowned by a molded arch and a decorative cornice. On either side of the central doorway are service entrances, still retaining their original two-over-two windows, which have been painted over. The mansard roof, unique among known extant buildings by John F. Jackson, was, according to Kate Reggev, most likely chosen for its ability to function as a roof as well as provide ample ceiling heights and dormer windows on the top floor and to distinguish the building from its neo-Classically detailed, metal-corniced residential neighbors.

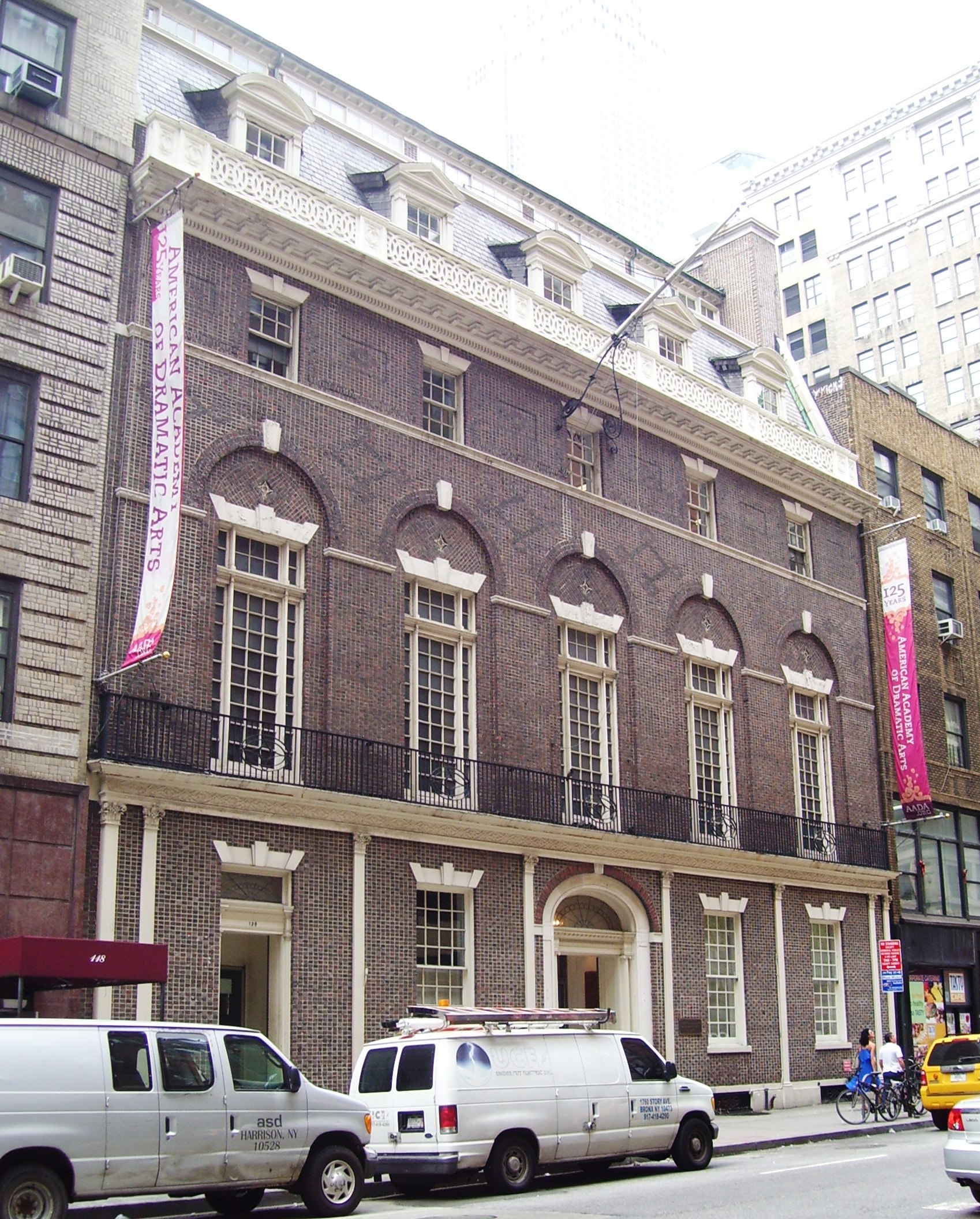
The neo-Federal "Old" Colony Club at 120 Madison Avenue has a gray slate roof and dormer windows

Reggev has suggested that the mansard roof could also have its origins in the design of Colonial Revival clubhouses in New York City. Jackson did not make any specific recommendations in terms of appropriate styles for Y.M.C.A. buildings and community houses, but he did suggest building materials that would not be "too rich in effect" to ultimately "have a club-like appearance." Community houses, in this sense, were likened to buildings used by the social elite, even though they were in fact used by middle and lower-class citizens and immigrants; in appearance, then, they hoped to rise above their social class and evoke a wealthy lifestyle, often with its heritage and roots in early America. It is perhaps from the slate mansard roofs of turn-of-the-century clubhouses in New York that the roof on the Downtown Community House is derived: the neo-Federal "Old" Colony Club in New York City (now the American Academy of Dramatic Arts, McKim, Mead and White, 1905-1906), with its gray slate roof and dormer windows, and the "New" Colony Club in New York (Delano & Aldrich, 1916), which had a red slate roof, could have influenced Jackson's design. The Century Association's 15th Street clubhouse (H.H. Richardson, 1869), although older and in the Second Empire Style, also boasts a slate mansard roof.

The building's current state has undergone only minor alterations; it was converted to office space in 1946, but was then soon reconverted into a community house with a recreation room, lounge, reading rooms, and classrooms in 1949. The exterior windows were replaced in 1965, and upon its conversion to a Buddhist temple in 2003, a small relief ornament of Buddha was placed on top of each keystone above the second story windows. At some point, the fluting of the pilasters of the entrance has also been painted, and the granite base and limestone ground floor have also been painted. A terra-cotta Chinese-style cornice was also added just above the ground floor and is in disrepair.

== See also ==
- Settlement and community houses in the United States
