= St. George's Syrian Catholic Church =

Former Syraic Catholic parish church in New York City

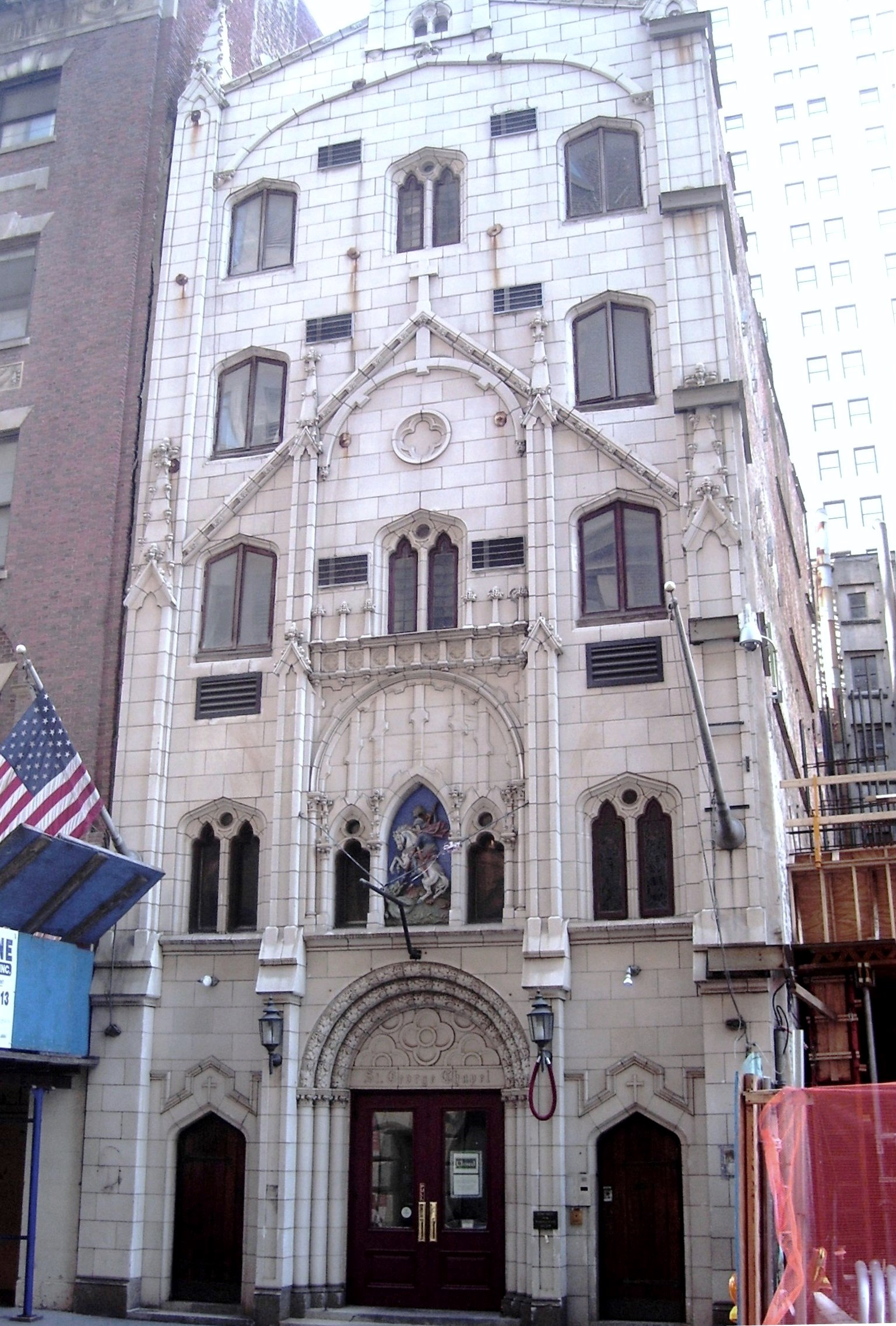

- location of St. George's Syrian Catholic Church, Manhattan
- 40°42′30.3″N 74°0′51″W
- Location: 103 Washington Street; Manhattan, New York City

History
- Founded: 1925
- Built: 1812
- Built for: Immigrant tenants

Site notes
- Area: Financial District; Lower Manhattan
- Architectural style: Neo-Gothic
- Restored: 1929
- Restored by: Harvey F. Cassab
- Governing body: Private
- Owner: Chapel Moran, Inc.

New York City Landmark
- Designated: July 14, 2009
- Reference no.: 2167

St. George's Syrian Catholic Church is a former church located at 103 Washington Street between Rector Street and Carlisle Street in the Financial District of Manhattan, New York City. The church is the last physical reminder of the Syrian American and Lebanese American community that once lived in Little Syria.

== History ==
Originally three stories tall with a peaked roof, the structure was built c.1812, and by 1850 was being used as a boardinghouse for immigrants; an additional two stories were added on in 1869. In 1925, the building was purchased by George E. Bardwil, a textiles importer, for the use of the Syrian Greek Catholic church, organized in 1889 to serve the Syrian- and Lebanese-American community in the Little Syria neighborhood, also known as the Syrian Quarter. Four years later, Harvey F. Cassab, a Lebanese-American draftsman, was hired to create a new facade for the building. His neo-Gothic design in white terra cotta with a polychrome relief of St. George and the Dragon remains intact.

After World War II, the Syrian and Lebanese population in the area declined, in part because the community was destroyed to make way for the Brooklyn–Battery Tunnel ramps. The Eastern Mediterranean community later moved to Atlantic Avenue in Brooklyn. The church briefly became a Latin Church parish, and then became disused as a church. In 1982 the building was bought by Moran Inc. and was turned into an Irish pub. The pub has now closed, however the building is still owned and maintained by Moran Inc.

The New York City Landmarks Preservation Commission designated the building a New York City landmark on July 14, 2009.

Marc Beherec argues that this church was the inspiration for H.P. Lovecraft's "The Horror at Red Hook". The building was constructed by Ryneer Suydam, a man with a name very similar to that of the story's Robert Suydam. Beherec argues that the building's conversion from Suydam's Federalist tenement to a Gothic church by a sect he (erroneously) believed to be Nestorian, which began while he was in New York inspired Lovecraft.

== See also ==
- List of New York City Designated Landmarks in Manhattan below 14th Street
