= Sahadi's =

Shop in Brooklyn, New York, United States

Coordinates: 40°41′24.6″N 73°59′36.3″W

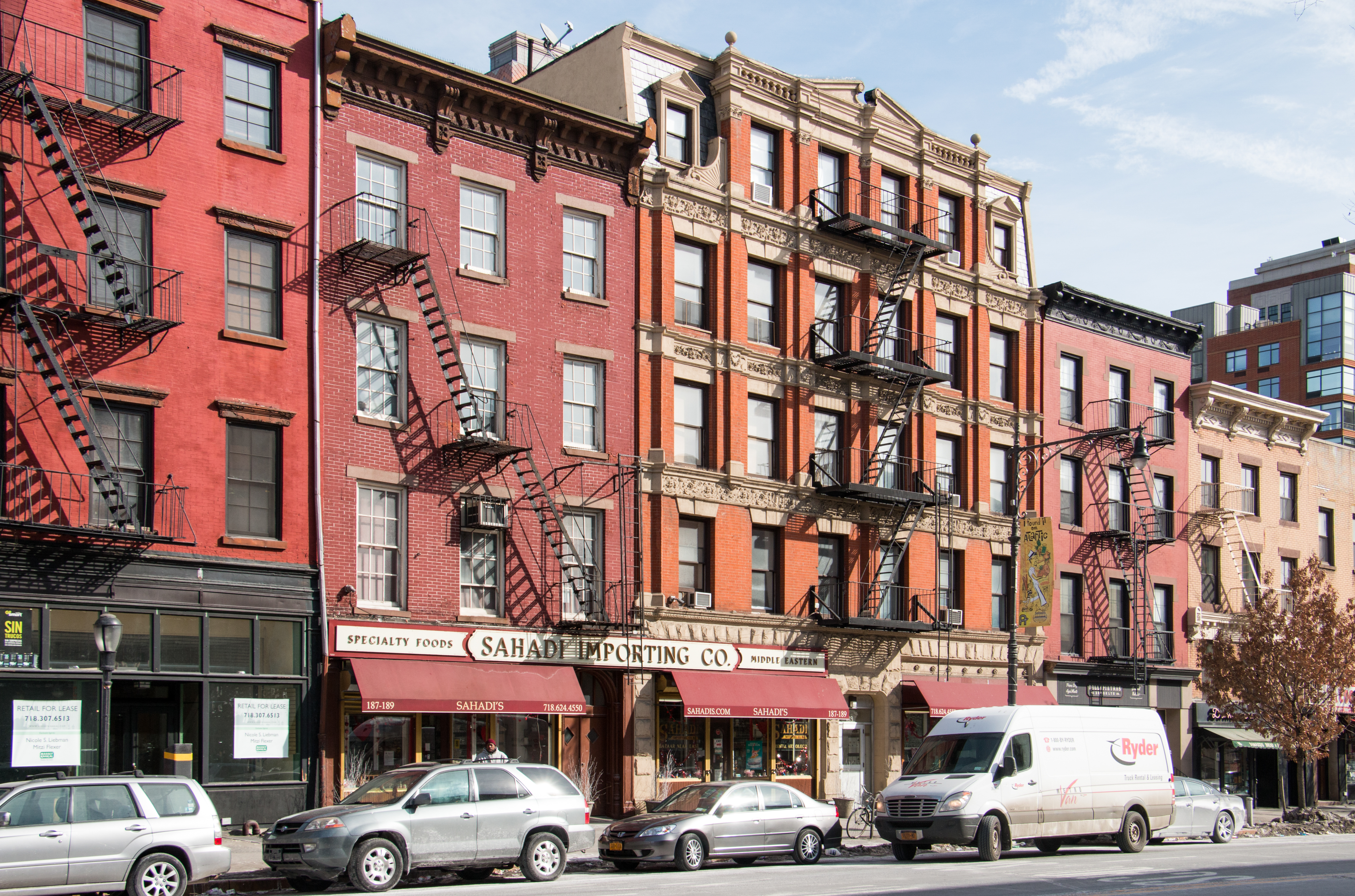
Sahadi's storefront on Atlantic Avenue in 2015

Sahadi's is a shop in Brooklyn, New York City. The business was established in Manhattan in 1895, and relocated to Brooklyn in 1941. In 2017, Sahadi's was named one of "America's Classics" by the James Beard Foundation Awards.

== History of Lebanese immigration in New York City ==
A large community of immigrants from the Middle East, including Lebanese immigrants, settled in the Lower West Side of Manhattan in the 1880s. This area was often referred to as "Little Syria" and "Manhattan's Syrian Quarter". There would come to be a lot of local Syrian, and broadly, Arabic businesses. These included newspaper stands, food establishments, shops selling "Holy Land goods", religious institutions, often there to serve the broadly Christian community, at the time. Many of these immigrants were living in unsafe, and unsanitary, tenements, as well as basement apartments. However, they were still able to create a bustling economic and cultural life in this neighborhood, which later expanded to Brooklyn; Atlantic Avenue and Bay Ridge, for example.

== Sahadi's history and present day ==
Map of Sahadi's locations

According to their website, the shop was first founded in the mid-1890s, in Manhattan's Little Syria neighborhood, specifically, on Washington Street. Abrahim Sahadi opened the first shop in the history of Sahadi's shops, which was called A. Sahadi and Company. This shop opened mostly to serve people from the Middle East who were migrating in large numbers to this area. Abrahim Sahadi was a Lebanese immigrant himself, but there were also immigrants coming from other countries in the Middle East, such as Jordanians, Palestinians, and Syrians. Later in 1919, Abrahim's nephew Wade joined the business, and in 1941 he went into business on his own.

This shop is still operating today at their location on Atlantic Avenue, a kiosk on Pier 57, as well as two locations at Industry City in Sunset Park, one being a Sahadi Spirits. Even amidst the changing demographics of these neighborhoods, especially in Brooklyn; Sahadi's has stayed constant. This is not a small feat. Gentrification is often talked about in respect to housing displacement, but it also refers to cultural displacement. The new people coming in to these neighborhoods have the power to redefine what types of cuisines should be elevated, and which ones should be pushed away. This is further exacerbated by the way food trends are created and circulated on social media. While Sahadi's serves all customers, including new customers, the shop has maintained its integrity, and has not changed in essence to be more palatable for new customers.

Christine Sahadi Whelan, one of the current operators of the shop, has written an award-winning cookbook, Flavors of the Sun.

== See also ==
- List of James Beard America's Classics
