= Airshaft =

Device used in manufacturing

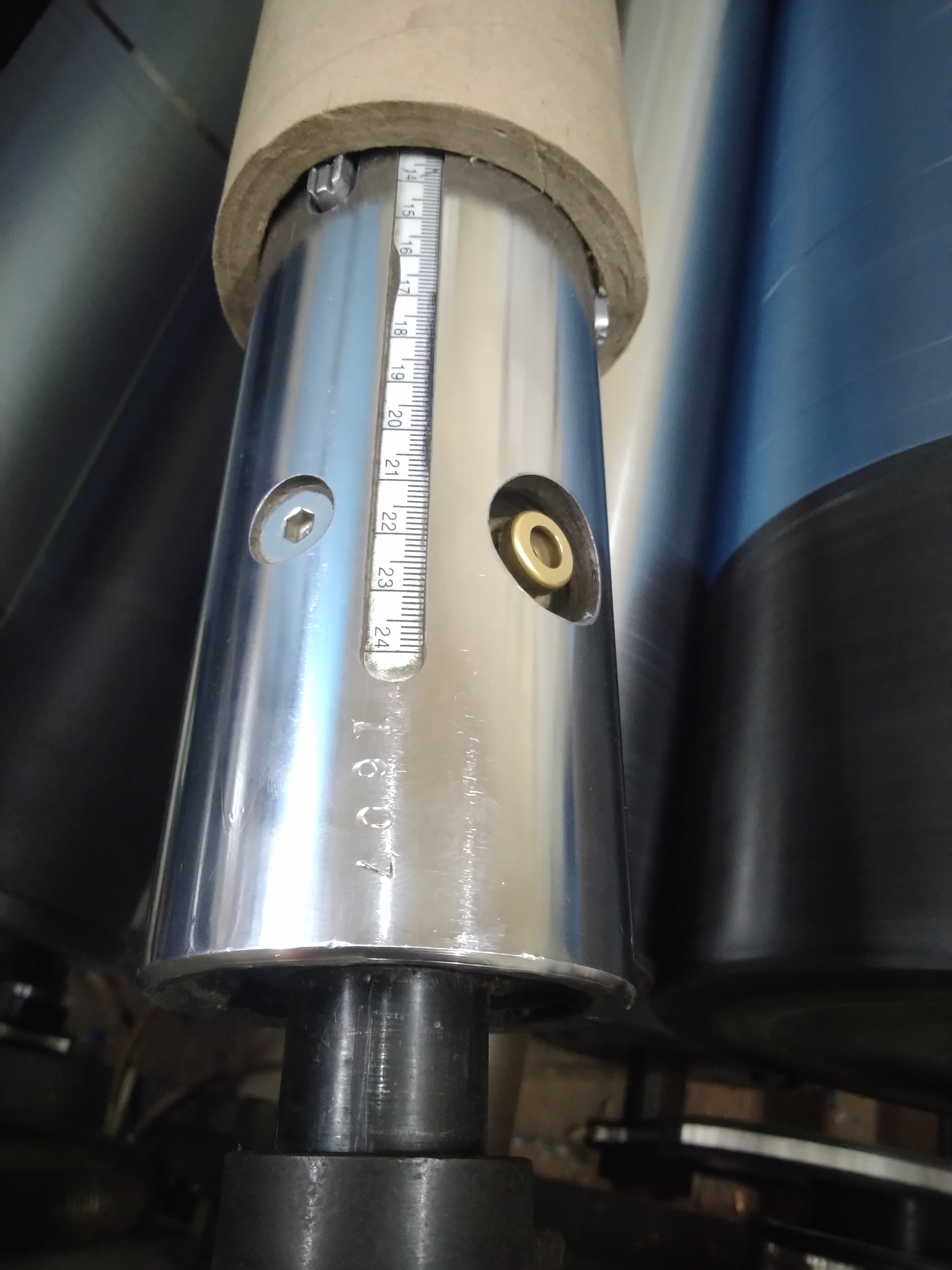
An airshaft's air inlet is visible (bronze-colored). Protruding holders beneath the paper core are expanding length-wise when air is let in.

In manufacturing, an airshaft is a device used for handling winding reels in the processing of web-fed materials, such as continuous-process printing presses.

Airshafts—also called air expanding shafts—are used in the manufacturing processes for fitting into a core onto which materials such as paper, card and plastic film are wound. An airshaft is designed so that, on fitting into a core, it can be readily expanded, thereby achieving a quick and firm attachment, it may also be easily deflated to facilitate easy withdrawal of the shaft after winding of product is complete. Their efficient design makes them ideal for mounting onto bearing housings to enable the winding or unwinding of rolls of stock material with the minimum of equipment down time. The advantage of using an airshaft is its ability to grip the core, without damage, whilst providing a positive interface to control the web via motors & brakes. Airshafts are available as either lug type (with bladder down the centre) or strip type (bladders on the periphery of the shaft).

Air shafts are used on many converting machines. An example of one of these machines is a slitting machine or slitter rewinder which is used to cut or slit large rolls of material into smaller rollers.

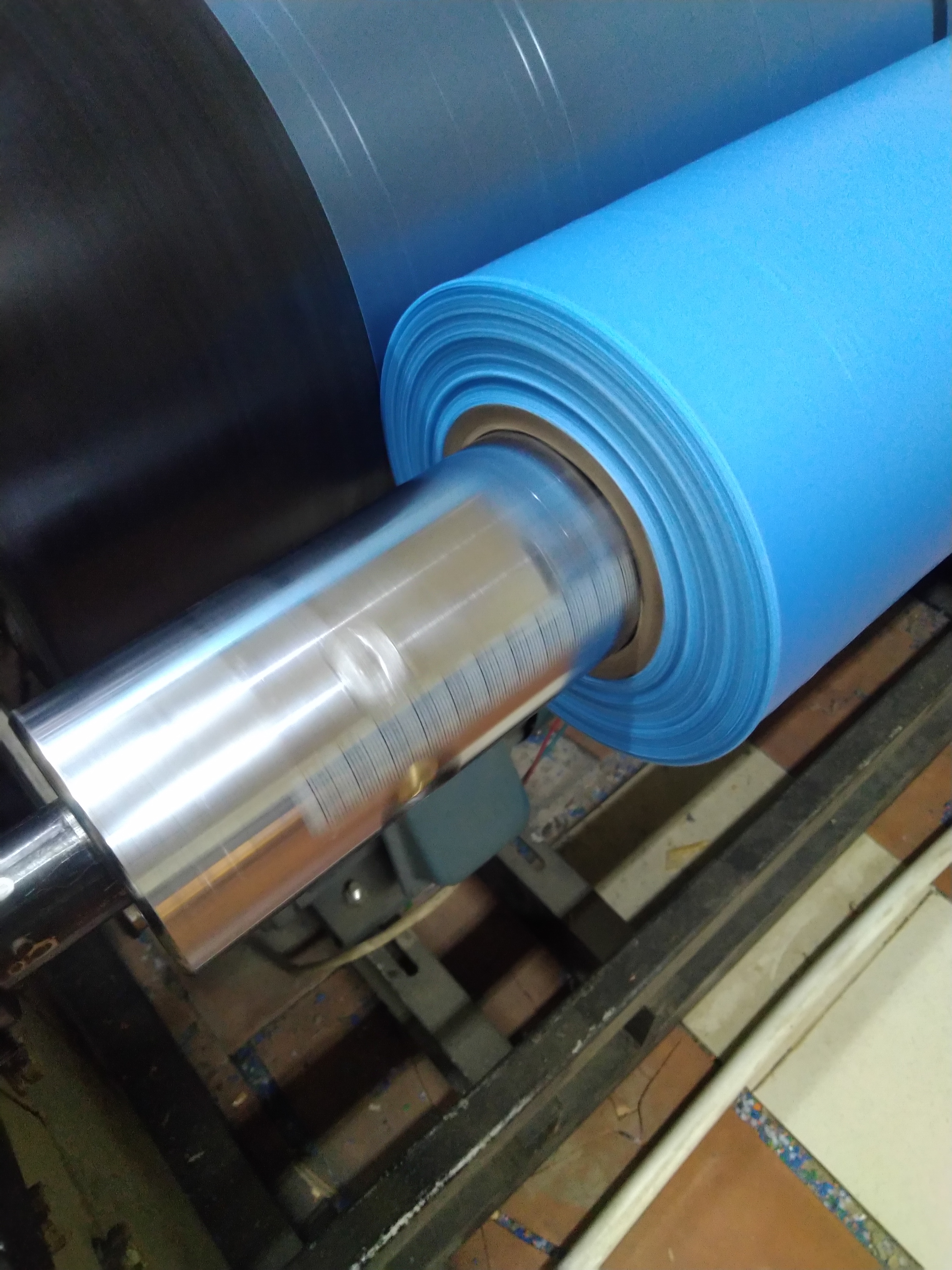
Airshaft winding a plastic polyethylene film

Air shaft is a machine part or shaft which tightens the core or roll on filling air. Air Shafts are of two types:

1. Contains Inflatable Rubber tube inside also called Lug shafts.
2. Which contains bladder multiple outside also called Multi-tube Shaft .

In Lugs type Air shaft, shaft consist of air bladder inside it. It is manufactured using Aluminium or Iron pipe as outer pipe in which there are u-shaped slot are there in which lugs are fitted manually. Then Inflatable bladder placed inside pipe below lugs. Then bladder is connected using a brass air valve. So, when we fill air using Air valve the bladder inflated and lugs comes out of shafts body (pipe) and tights the core in which shafts is placed.

In Multi tube Air Shafts there are small flat tubes placed outside the body of shafts which get in round shapes on filling air in it using Brass Air Valve and Lugs comes out of body and tight the core. These times Air Shafts & Multi tube Shafts are finding very important placed in industries where they use any kind of cores or rolls. Its main application is on Printing-Packaging industries & Textile Industries.
