= Marie el-Khoury =

Marie Azeez el-Khoury (Arabic: ماري عزيز الخوري) (1883 — September 26, 1957) was a Syrian-born American journalist and jewelry designer.

== Early life ==
Marie Azeez and her older sister Alice were born in the Mount Lebanon region of greater Syria, and moved to the United States as children in 1891, with their parents Tannous Azeez and Julia Tabet. Her father opened a jewelry business in lower Manhattan. He later moved his business to Atlantic City, New Jersey.

Marie attended Drew Seminary in Carmel, New York, and Washington College for Young Ladies in Eckington, graduating in 1900 when she was just 17 years old.

== Career ==
As a young woman Marie Azeez wrote for Arabic-language publications in the United States, and intended a career in journalism. But she was widowed in 1904, and her father died in 1905, leaving Marie to support her mother and sister. She took over the remains of Tannous Azeez's jewelry business, which was mostly destroyed in a fire in 1904, and moved it back to Manhattan, this time on Fifth Avenue, with a later move to Park Avenue. She kept the business's name, "The Little Shop of T. Azeez", in her father's memory. She was present for at least two robbery attempts in her shop. Her designs were featured in Vogue and The New Yorker. The Christian Science Monitor described her as "a traveler, a poet, a philosopher, and into every necklace, bracelet, pendant, she puts the complexity and subtlety of her own nature."

She continued writing, including some jewel-themed short stories syndicated in Sunday newspapers across the United States. Marie el-Khoury donated a bound volume of al-Da'irah (1900-1901), the "first magazine published in Arabic in the Western Hemisphere", to the Library of Congress in 1945. She was also a sustaining member of the Metropolitan Museum of Art.

== Personal life ==
Marie Azeez married magazine publisher Esau el-Khoury in 1902. She was widowed at age 21 when Esau died in 1904. Marie Azeez el-Khoury died in 1957, aged 74 years, in New York. Her New York Times obituary remembered her as "one of this city's leading and most original jewelry designers".
