= Washington Street (Manhattan) =

Street in Manhattan, New York

Coordinates: 40°43′22″N 74°00′37″W

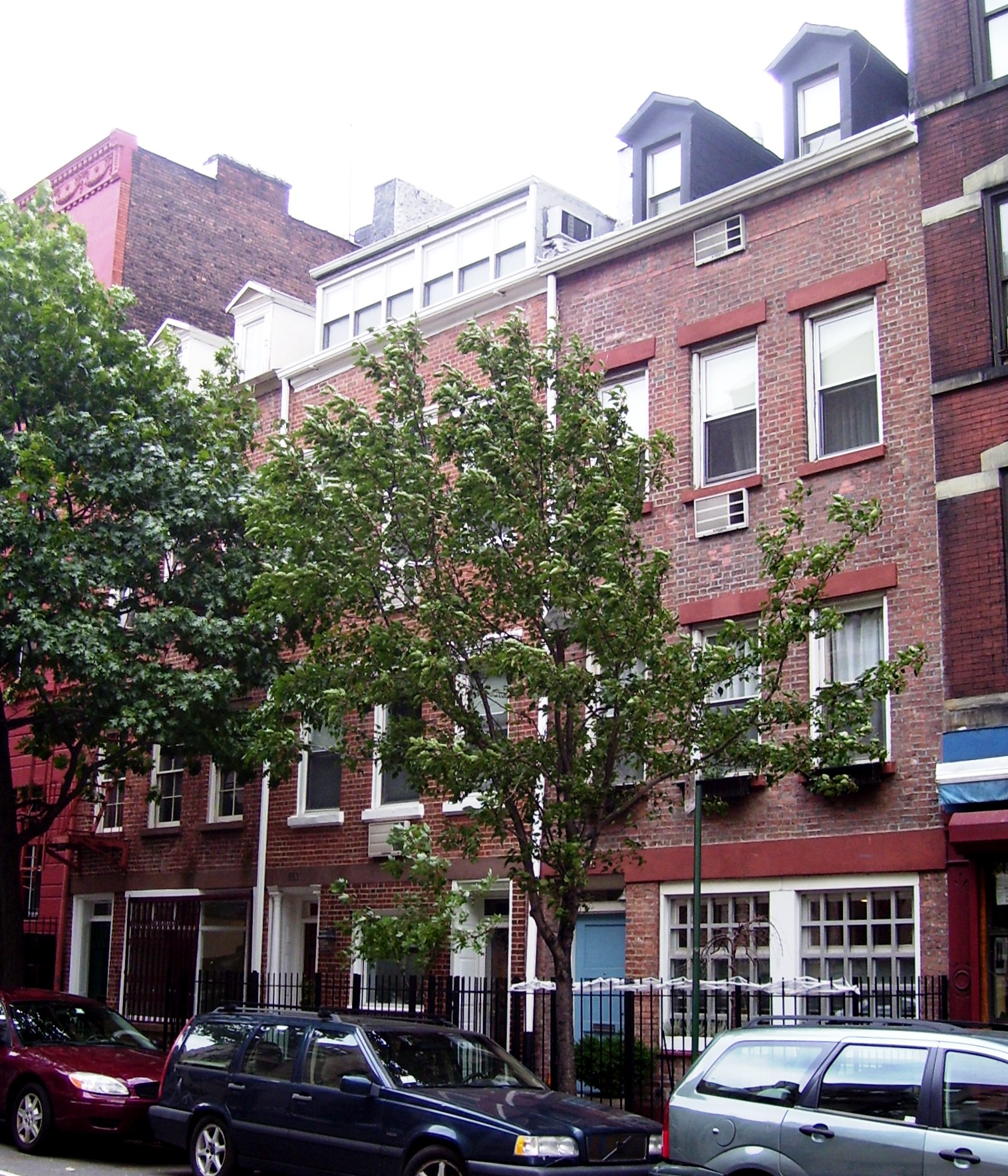
These Federal-style townhouses at 651–655 Washington Street are located within the Greenwich Village Historic District Extension

Washington Street is a north–south street in the New York City borough of Manhattan. It runs in several distinct pieces, from its northernmost end at 14th Street in the Meatpacking District to its southern end at Battery Place in Battery Park City. Washington Street is, for most of its length, the westernmost street in lower Manhattan other than West Street. The exceptions are a one-block segment in the West Village where Weehawken Street lies between West and Washington Streets, and in Battery Park City.

Main east–west streets crossed include (from north to south) Christopher Street, Houston Street and Canal Street; neighborhoods traversed include the Meatpacking District, the West Village, Hudson Square and Tribeca. At points north of Canal Street, traffic on Washington Street travels south; at points south of Canal Street, it travels north.

== History ==
Washington Street was named for George Washington, first President of the United States. The land under the street was owned by Trinity Church, and was ceded to the city in 1808.

Until the 1940s, a stretch of Washington Street, especially from Battery Place to Rector Street, was the home of the city's Little Syria neighborhood, which consisted primarily of Christian Arab immigrants from present day Lebanon and Syria. The neighborhood and its homes, then described by The New York Times as the "heart of New York's Arab world", were condemned and razed to make way for the approaches to the Brooklyn-Battery Tunnel, which opened in 1950.

At the current location of the World Trade Center site, Washington Street once ran through a neighborhood called Radio Row, which specialized in selling radio parts. The neighborhood was demolished in 1962, when the area was condemned to make way for the construction of the World Trade Center. Much of Washington Street's route within this area, from Hubert Street in Tribeca to Albany Street south of the current World Trade Center, has since been demolished except for a one-block segment between Barclay and Vesey Streets, at the east facade of the Verizon Building. In the first decade of the 21st century, another one-block segment of Washington Street in Tribeca still ran from Warren to Murray Street. 101 Warren Street was being developed on the site by 2006, replacing that remaining section of Washington Street.

== Notable structures ==
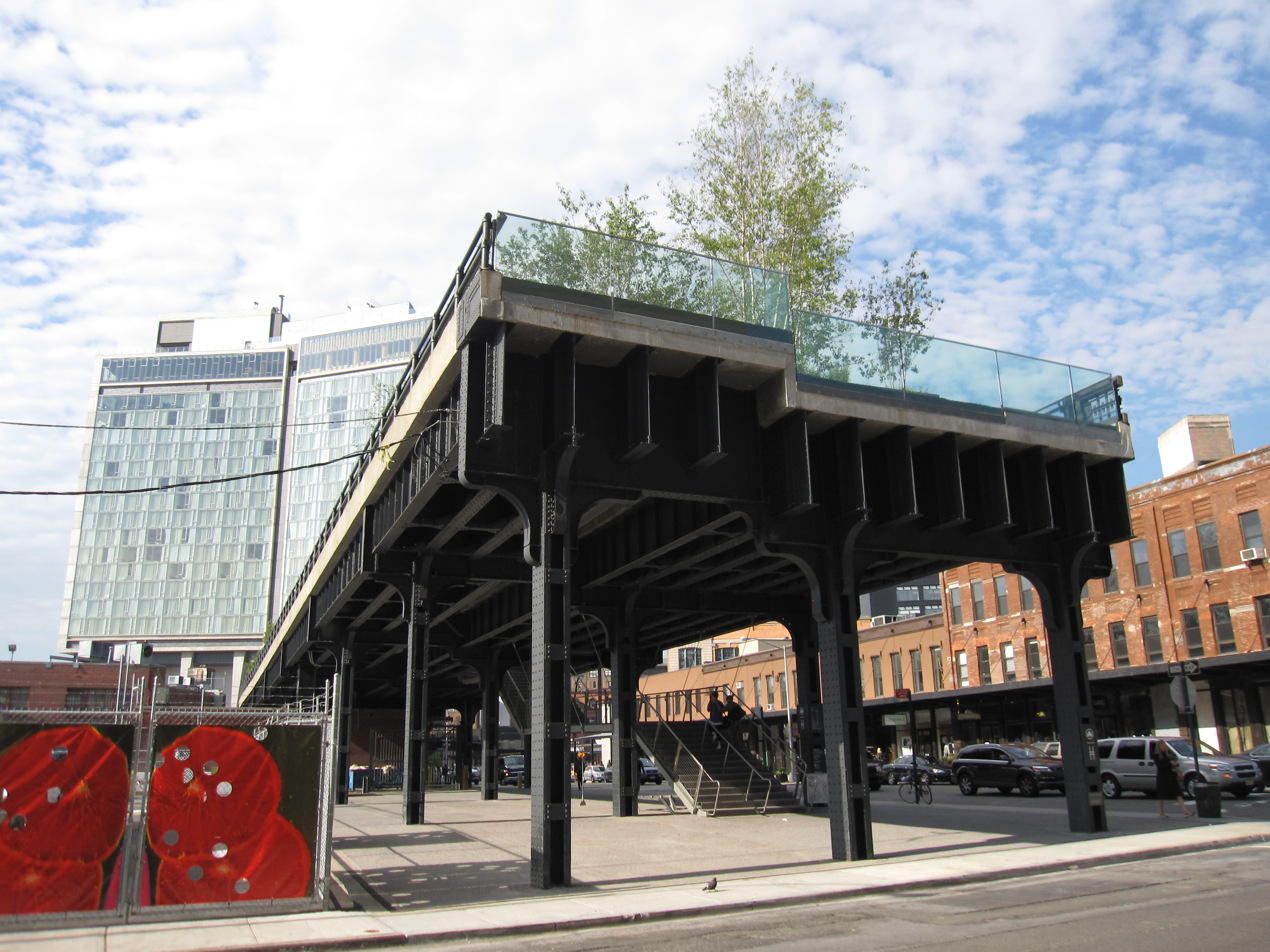
The end of the High Line Park at Gansevoort and Washington Streets; in the background is the Standard Hotel

- 7 World Trade Center – a skyscraper built on the site of one of the same name destroyed in the September 11 attacks
- 130 Cedar Street – luxury hotel
- Barclay–Vesey Building – residential building between Barclay and Vesey Streets
- Fleming Smith Warehouse – residential building at Watts Street
- Newgate Prison – the state's first penitentiary from 1797 to 1829
- High Line – linear park
- The Standard, High Line – luxury hotel
- Washington Street Plaza – pedestrian plaza between Carlisle and Albany Streets
- Westbeth Artists Community (formerly Bell Laboratories Building) – former Bell Labs facility converted to residential and artists' spaces
- West Village Houses – a Jane Jacobs inspired set of infill buildings constructed in lieu of large apartment blocks

== Transportation ==
Because Washington Street is so far west, public transportation in the immediate area is scarce. The crosstown M8 bus crosses Washington Street in both directions, westbound on Christopher Street and eastbound on West 10th Street; the crosstown M21 bus runs south on Washington Street between Houston Street and Spring Street before turning back east.

Subway stations nearest to Washington Street include (from north to south) the 14th Street – Eighth Avenue station on the IND Eighth Avenue Line and the BMT Canarsie Line (A, C, E, and L trains) and the Christopher Street – Sheridan Square, Houston Street, Canal Street and Franklin Street, Chambers Street, & Rector Street stations on the IRT Broadway – Seventh Avenue Line (1 and 2 trains).
