= List of streetcar lines in Manhattan =

The following streetcar lines once operated in Manhattan, New York City, New York, United States.

== List of lines ==
=== North-south lines ===
Lines related to Broadway are listed first, and then the table contains all other lines by their Lower Manhattan trunk (if applicable) from north to south.

Company (post-1911)	Name	From	To	Major streets	History
New York Railways	South Ferry and Vesey Street Line	South Ferry	City Hall	Trinity Place	became part of the Sixth Avenue Line and Eighth Avenue Line
New York Railways	Broadway Line	South Ferry	Central Park	Broadway and Seventh Avenue	opened by the Broadway and Seventh Avenue Railroad in 1864; leased by the Houston, West Street and Pavonia Ferry Railroad in 1893; leased by the Metropolitan Street Railway in 1893; leased by New York Railways in 1911; replaced by New York City Omnibus Corporation buses on February 12, 1936 (now the M5 bus)
New York Railways	Lexington Avenue Line	Union Square, earlier South Ferry	Harlem	Broadway, 23rd Street, Lexington Avenue, 116th Street, and Lenox Avenue	opened by the Lexington Avenue and Pavonia Ferry Railroad; merged into the Metropolitan Street Railway in 1894; acquired by New York Railways in 1911; replaced by New York City Omnibus Corporation buses on March 25, 1936 (now the M102 bus)
New York Railways	Broadway and Columbus Avenue Line	South Ferry	Harlem	Broadway, Seventh Avenue, 53rd Street, Columbus Avenue, 116th Street, and Lenox Avenue	opened by the Columbus and Ninth Avenue Railroad; leased by the Metropolitan Street Railway in 1893 and merged in 1895; acquired by New York Railways in 1911; replaced by New York City Omnibus Corporation buses on February 12, 1936 (now the M7 bus)
New York Railways	Broadway and Amsterdam Avenue Line	Houston Street	Manhattanville	Broadway, Seventh Avenue, 53rd Street, Ninth Avenue, Broadway, and Amsterdam Avenue	eliminated in 1919
New York Railways	Broadway and University Place Line	City Hall	Central Park	Church Street, Greene Street, Wooster Street, University Place, and Broadway	replaced by the Broadway Line
Third Avenue Railway	Broadway Line	East 34th Street Ferry	Fort Lee Ferry	34th Street, First Avenue, 42nd Street, Broadway, and 125th Street	December 15, 1946 (now the M104 bus)
Third Avenue Railway	Kingsbridge Line	East Harlem	Marble Hill	125th Street, Amsterdam Avenue, and Broadway	June 22, 1947 (now the M100 bus)
Third Avenue Railway	Broadway and 145th Street Line	Harlem	Washington Heights	145th Street, Amsterdam Avenue, and Broadway	June 29, 1947
Third Avenue Railway	East Belt Line	South Ferry	59th Street, earlier East Harlem	South Street, Avenue D, 14th Street, and First Avenue	opened by the Central Park, North and East River Railroad in 1863; leased to the Houston, West Street and Pavonia Ferry Railroad and Metropolitan Crosstown Railway in 1892; leased to the Metropolitan Street Railway in 1893; lease cancelled in 1908; bought by the Third Avenue Railway as part of the reorganized Belt Line Railway in 1913
Third Avenue Railway	Avenue D Line	City Hall	East 23rd Street Ferry	East Broadway, Columbia Street, Lewis Street, Avenue D, 14th Street, and Avenue A	discontinued early, since it was largely redundant with the Avenue B Line and East Belt Line
Third Avenue Railway	Avenue B Line	City Hall	East 34th Street Ferry	East Broadway, Avenue B, 14th Street, Avenue A, 24th Street, and First Avenue	opened by the Dry Dock, East Broadway and Battery Railroad; bought by the Third Avenue Railroad in 1897; leased by the Metropolitan Street Railway in 1900; lease cancelled in 1908; replaced by Avenue B and East Broadway Transit Company buses on July 30, 1932 (now the M9 bus)
N/A	Avenue A Line	Williamsburg Bridge	East 23rd Street Ferry	Avenue A	
Second Avenue Railroad	Astoria Line	Astor Place	East 92nd Street Ferry	Second Avenue, 86th Street, and York Avenue	Established 1910 and discontinued April 7, 1957
Second Avenue Railroad	First Avenue Line	Astor Place	East Harlem	Second Avenue, 59th Street, and First Avenue	
Second Avenue Railroad	Second Avenue Line	Worth Street, earlier City Hall or Peck Slip	East Harlem	Worth Street, Bowery, and Second Avenue	opened by the Second Avenue Railroad in 1853; leased by the Metropolitan Street Railway in 1898; lease cancelled in 1908; replaced by East Side Omnibus Corporation buses on June 25, 1933 (now the M15 bus)
Third Avenue Railway	Third Avenue Line	City Hall	Washington Heights	Bowery, Third Avenue, 125th Street, and Amsterdam Avenue	opened by the Third Avenue Railroad in 1853; leased by the Metropolitan Street Railway in 1900; lease cancelled in 1908; reorganized as the Third Avenue Railway in 1910; replaced by Surface Transportation Corporation buses on May 28, 1947 (now the M101 bus)
New York Railways	Fourth and Madison Avenues Line	City Hall	Harlem, earlier also East 34th Street Ferry	Centre Street, Bowery, Park Avenue, and Madison Avenue	opened by the New York and Harlem Railroad in 1832; leased by the Metropolitan Street Railway in 1896; leased by New York Railways in 1911; lease cancelled in 1920 but reinstated in 1932; replaced by Madison Avenue Coach Company buses on February 1, 1935 (now the M1 bus)
N/A	Fourth Avenue and Williamsburg Bridge Line	Williamsburg, Brooklyn	Grand Central Terminal	Bowery and Park Avenue	operated from 1904 to 1911 by the Metropolitan Street Railway
New York Railways	Sixth Avenue Line	Greenwich Village, earlier South Ferry	Central Park	Trinity Place, West Broadway, and Sixth Avenue	opened by the Sixth Avenue Railroad in 1852; leased by the Houston, West Street and Pavonia Ferry Railroad in 1892; leased by the Metropolitan Street Railway in 1893; leased by New York Railways in 1911; replaced by New York City Omnibus Corporation buses on March 12, 1936 (now the M6 bus)
New York Railways	Sixth Avenue Ferry Line	Desbrosses Street Ferry	Greenwich Village	Watts Street, Varick Street, and Carmine Street	discontinued September 21, 1919
New York Railways	Sixth and Amsterdam Avenues Line	South Ferry	Manhattanville	Trinity Place, West Broadway, Sixth Avenue, 53rd Street, Columbus Avenue, Broadway, and Amsterdam Avenue	eliminated in 1919
New York Railways	Lenox Avenue Line	Central Park	Harlem	Lenox Avenue	became part of the Broadway and Columbus Avenue Line and Broadway and Lexington Avenue Line
New York Railways	Seventh Avenue Line	Greenwich Village, earlier Williamsburg, Brooklyn or City Hall	Central Park	Greenwich Avenue and Seventh Avenue	opened by the Broadway and Seventh Avenue Railroad in 1864; leased by the Houston, West Street and Pavonia Ferry Railroad in 1893; leased by the Metropolitan Street Railway in 1893; leased by New York Railways in 1911; replaced by New York City Omnibus Corporation buses on March 6, 1936 (now the M10 bus)
N/A	Seventh Avenue and Fort Lee Ferry Line	Brooklyn Bridge	Fort Lee Ferry	Centre Street, Canal Street, West Broadway, Sixth Avenue, 23rd Street, Seventh Avenue, Broadway, and 125th Street	established late 1890s and discontinued March 6, 1937
New York Railways	Eighth Avenue Line	South Ferry or Cortlandt Street Ferry	Harlem	Trinity Place, West Broadway, and Eighth Avenue	opened by the Eighth Avenue Railroad in 1852; leased by the Metropolitan Street Railway in 1896; leased by New York Railways in 1911; lease cancelled in 1919; merged into the Eighth and Ninth Avenues Railway in 1926; replaced by Eighth Avenue Coach Corporation buses on November 12, 1935 (now the M10 bus)
New York Railways	Ninth and Columbus Avenues Line	Cortlandt Street Ferry	Morningside Heights	Greenwich Street, Washington Street, Ninth Avenue, and Columbus Avenue	split between the Ninth Avenue Line and Broadway and Columbus Avenue Line
New York Railways	Ninth and Amsterdam Avenues Line	Cortlandt Street Ferry or Christopher Street Ferry, earlier City Hall	Morningside Heights	Greenwich Street, Washington Street, Ninth Avenue, Broadway, and Amsterdam Avenue	opened by the Ninth Avenue Railroad in 1859; leased by the Houston, West Street and Pavonia Ferry Railroad in 1892; leased by the Metropolitan Street Railway in 1893; leased by New York Railways in 1911; lease cancelled in 1919; merged into the Eighth and Ninth Avenues Railway in 1926; replaced by Eighth Avenue Coach Corporation buses on November 12, 1935 (now the M11 bus)
Third Avenue Railway	West Belt Line	South Ferry	Midtown	West Street and Tenth Avenue	opened by the Central Park, North and East River Railroad in 1863; leased to the Houston, West Street and Pavonia Ferry Railroad and Metropolitan Crosstown Railway in 1892; leased to the Metropolitan Street Railway in 1893; lease cancelled in 1908; bought by the Third Avenue Railway as part of the reorganized Belt Line Railway in 1913
Third Avenue Railway	Tenth Avenue Line	West 42nd Street Ferry	Manhattanville	42nd Street, Amsterdam Avenue, Broadway, and 125th Street	November 17, 1946

=== East-west lines ===
Lines are listed roughly from east to west.

Company (post-1911)	Name	From	To	Major streets	History
N/A	Fulton Street Crosstown Line	Cortlandt Street Ferry or Barclay Street Ferry	Fulton Street Ferry	Fulton Street	1908
New York Railways	Chambers and Madison Streets Line	Pavonia Ferry	Grand Street Ferry, earlier also Roosevelt Street Ferry	Chambers Street and Madison Street	discontinued September 21, 1919 (now the M22 bus)
N/A	Cortlandt Street Line	Cortlandt Street Ferry or Broadway	Grand Street Ferry	Greenwich Street, Washington Street, North Moore Street, Beach Street, Canal Street, and East Broadway	discontinued January 24, 1948
Joint (NYR, TARS, BRT)	Brooklyn and North River Line	Desbrosses Street Ferry	Downtown Brooklyn	Canal Street, Manhattan Bridge, and Flatbush Avenue	discontinued October 1919
Third Avenue Railway	Post Office Line	City Hall	Williamsburg, Brooklyn	Bowery, Grand Street, Essex Street, and Delancey Street	Established October 1, 1895 and discontinued 1919
New York Railways	Canal Street Crosstown Line	TriBeCa	Chinatown	Canal Street	Established 1892 and discontinued 1929
Third Avenue Railway	Grand Street Line	Desbrosses Street Ferry	Williamsburg, Brooklyn or Grand Street Ferry	Vestry Street and Grand Street	Established 1860s and discontinued 1919/1949
New York Railways	Metropolitan Crosstown Line	Desbrosses Street Ferry, earlier also West 14th Street Ferry and Union Square	Grand Street Ferry	Watts Street, Spring Street, and Delancey Street	discontinued September 21, 1919; restored from February 1, 1920 to May 20, 1931 by court order
New York Railways	Avenue C Line	Desbrosses Street Ferry, earlier Chambers Street Ferry	East 23rd Street Ferry, earlier Grand Central Terminal	West Street, Charlton Street, Houston Street, Prince Street, Stanton Street, Third Street, Avenue C, 17th Street, 18th Street, and Avenue A	discontinued September 21, 1919 (Served on Avenue C by M9 and Houston Street by M21)
New York Railways	Bleecker Street Line	Chelsea, earlier West 23rd Street Ferry	Broadway, earlier Fulton Ferry	Bleecker Street	Established 1864 and discontinued July 26, 1917
New York Railways	Eighth Street Crosstown Line	Christopher Street Ferry	Williamsburg, Brooklyn or East Tenth Street Ferry	Christopher Street, Tenth Street, Eighth Street, Ninth Street, and Tenth Street	March 6, 1936 (now the M8 bus)
New York Railways	14th Street Crosstown Line	West 23rd Street Ferry	Williamsburg, Brooklyn, earlier also Grand Street Ferry	West Street, 14th Street, and Avenue A	April 20, 1936 (now the M14 bus) last NY Railways line converted to buses
New York Railways	17th and 18th Streets Crosstown Line	Greenwich Village, earlier Christopher Street Ferry	East 23rd Street Ferry	University Place, 17th Street, 18th Street, and Avenue A	1913
N/A	Christopher and 23rd Streets Line	Christopher Street Ferry	East 23rd Street Ferry	Greenwich Street, Washington Street, 14th Street, and Avenue A	
New York Railways	23rd Street Crosstown Line	West 23rd Street Ferry	East 23rd Street Ferry or East 34th Street Ferry, earlier also Union Square	23rd Street	April 8, 1936 (now the M23 bus)
N/A	Grand Central Station and West 23rd Street Ferry Line	West 23rd Street Ferry	Grand Central Terminal	23rd Street and Park Avenue	Established 1872 and discontinued April 8, 1936
Third Avenue Railway	28th and 29th Streets Crosstown Line	West 23rd Street Ferry	East 34th Street Ferry	11th Avenue, 28th Street, 29th Street, and First Avenue	leased to the Metropolitan Street Railway in 1896; lease cancelled in 1908
New York Railways	West 34th Street Pier Line	West 34th Street Ferry	Tenth Avenue	34th Street	Established 1890s and discontinued April 1, 1936
New York Railways	34th Street Crosstown Line	West 42nd Street Ferry	East 34th Street Ferry	Tenth Avenue and 34th Street	April 1, 1936 (now the M16 and M34 buses)
Third Avenue Railway	42nd Street Crosstown Line	West 42nd Street Ferry	East 42nd Street Ferry or Long Island City, Queens; earlier also East 34th Street Ferry	42nd Street and Third Avenue	November 17, 1946 (now the M42 bus)
N/A	42nd Street and Grand Street Ferry Line	West 42nd Street Ferry	Grand Street Ferry	42nd Street, Tenth Avenue, 34th Street, Broadway, 23rd Street, Fourth Avenue, 14th Street, Avenue A, and Houston Street	Established 1862 and discontinued 1919
New York Railways	53rd Street Crosstown Line	Ninth Avenue	Sixth Avenue	53rd Street	became part of the Broadway and Amsterdam Avenue Line, Broadway and Columbus Avenue Line, and Sixth and Amsterdam Avenues Line
Third Avenue Railway	59th Street Crosstown Line	Tenth Avenue	First Avenue	59th Street	opened by the Central Park, North and East River Railroad; leased to the Houston, West Street and Pavonia Ferry Railroad and Metropolitan Crosstown Railway in 1892; leased to the Metropolitan Street Railway in 1893; lease cancelled in 1908; bought by the Third Avenue Railway as part of the reorganized Belt Line Railway in 1913; replaced by Surface Transportation Corporation buses on November 10, 1946
New York Railways	86th Street Crosstown Line	Upper West Side	East 92nd Street Ferry	86th Street and York Avenue	New York and Harlem Railroad from 1920 to 1932; Bustitution on June 8, 1936 (now the M86 bus)
Third Avenue Railway	110th Street Crosstown Line	Fort Lee Ferry	East Harlem	125th Street, St. Nicholas Avenue, and 110th Street	
New York Railways	116th Street Crosstown Line	Morningside Heights	East Harlem	106th Street, Manhattan Avenue, and 116th Street	April 1, 1936 (now the M116 bus)
Third Avenue Railway	125th Street Crosstown Line	Fort Lee Ferry	East Harlem	125th Street	August 5, 1941 (no longer a separate bus route; served by the Bx15 and M60)
Union Railway	138th Street Crosstown Line	Harlem	Bronx	135th Street and Madison Avenue	July 10, 1948 (now the Bx33 bus in the Bronx)
New York Railways	145th Street Crosstown Line	Broadway	Lenox Avenue	145th Street	Originally operated by the Fort George and Eleventh Avenue Railroad
Union Railway	163rd Street Crosstown Line	Washington Heights	Bronx	155th Street	June 27, 1948 (now the Bx6 bus)
Union Railway	167th Street Crosstown Line	Washington Heights	Bronx	181st Street	July 11, 1948 (now the Bx35 bus)
Union Railway	207th Street Crosstown Line	Inwood	Bronx	207th Street	now the Bx12 bus

== See also ==
- List of streetcar lines in the Bronx
- List of streetcar lines in Brooklyn
- List of streetcar lines in Queens
- List of streetcar lines in Staten Island
- List of streetcar lines on Long Island
- List of town tramway systems in the United States
