= M23 (New York City bus) =

Bus route in Manhattan, New York

m23
- 23rd Street Crosstown
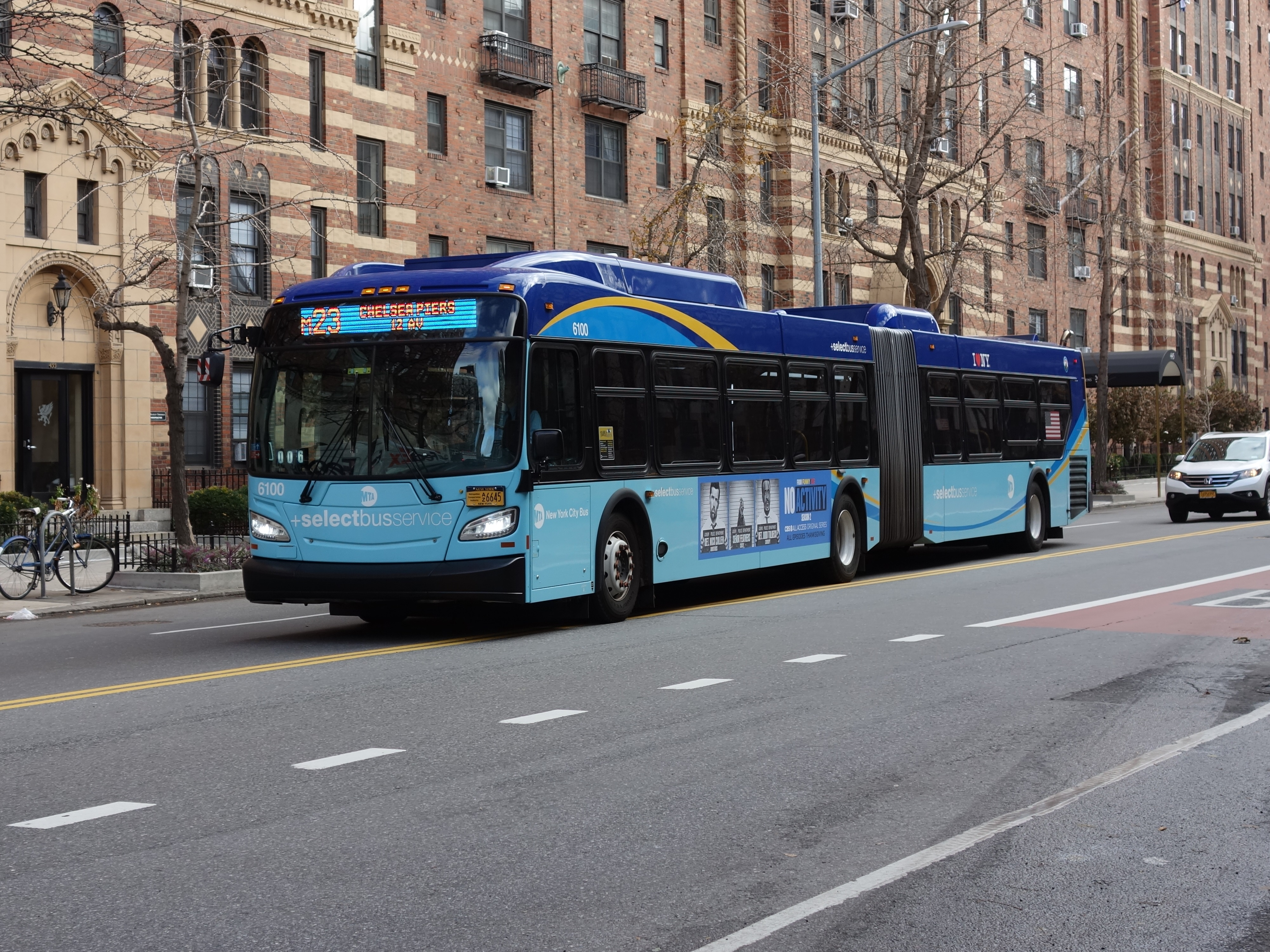
- A 2017 XD60 (6100) on the Chelsea Piers-bound M23 SBS in 2018

Overview
- System: MTA Regional Bus Operations
- Operator: Manhattan and Bronx Surface Transit Operating Authority
- Garage: Michael J. Quill Depot
- Vehicle: Nova Bus LFS articulated New Flyer Xcelsior XD60; New Flyer Xcelsior XE60 (main vehicles); New Flyer Xcelsior XD40; New Flyer Xcelsior XE40; Nova Bus LFS HEV (supplemental service)
- Livery: Select Bus Service

Route
- Locale: Manhattan, New York, U.S.
- Communities served: Chelsea, Flatiron District, Gramercy Park, Kips Bay, Stuyvesant Town–Peter Cooper Village
- Start: Avenue C – 20th Street
- Via: 23rd Street
- End: Chelsea Piers – 12th Avenue
- Length: 2.4 miles (3.9 km) (westbound)

Service
- Operates: 24 hours
- Annual patronage: 2,479,995 (2025)
- Transfers: Yes
- Timetable: M23 SBS

The 23rd Street Crosstown is a surface transit line on 23rd Street in Manhattan, New York City. It currently hosts the M23 SBS bus route of the Metropolitan Transportation Authority (MTA)'s Regional Bus Operations. The M23 runs between Chelsea Piers, along the West Side Highway near 22nd Street, via 23rd Street, to Avenue C and 20th Street in Stuyvesant Town–Peter Cooper Village (signed as Gramercy Park).

The route was originally the Twenty-third Street Railway, a street railway that was originally operated as horse cars and later electric traction. The company was chartered on January 29, 1872. The Twenty-third Street Railway was leased by numerous larger companies in the late 19th and early 20th century. The trolley line was replaced with bus service in 1936 and was originally numbered the M18-15 and the M26 before gaining the current M23 designation in 1989. On November 6, 2016, it became a Select Bus Service (SBS) route.

== Route description ==
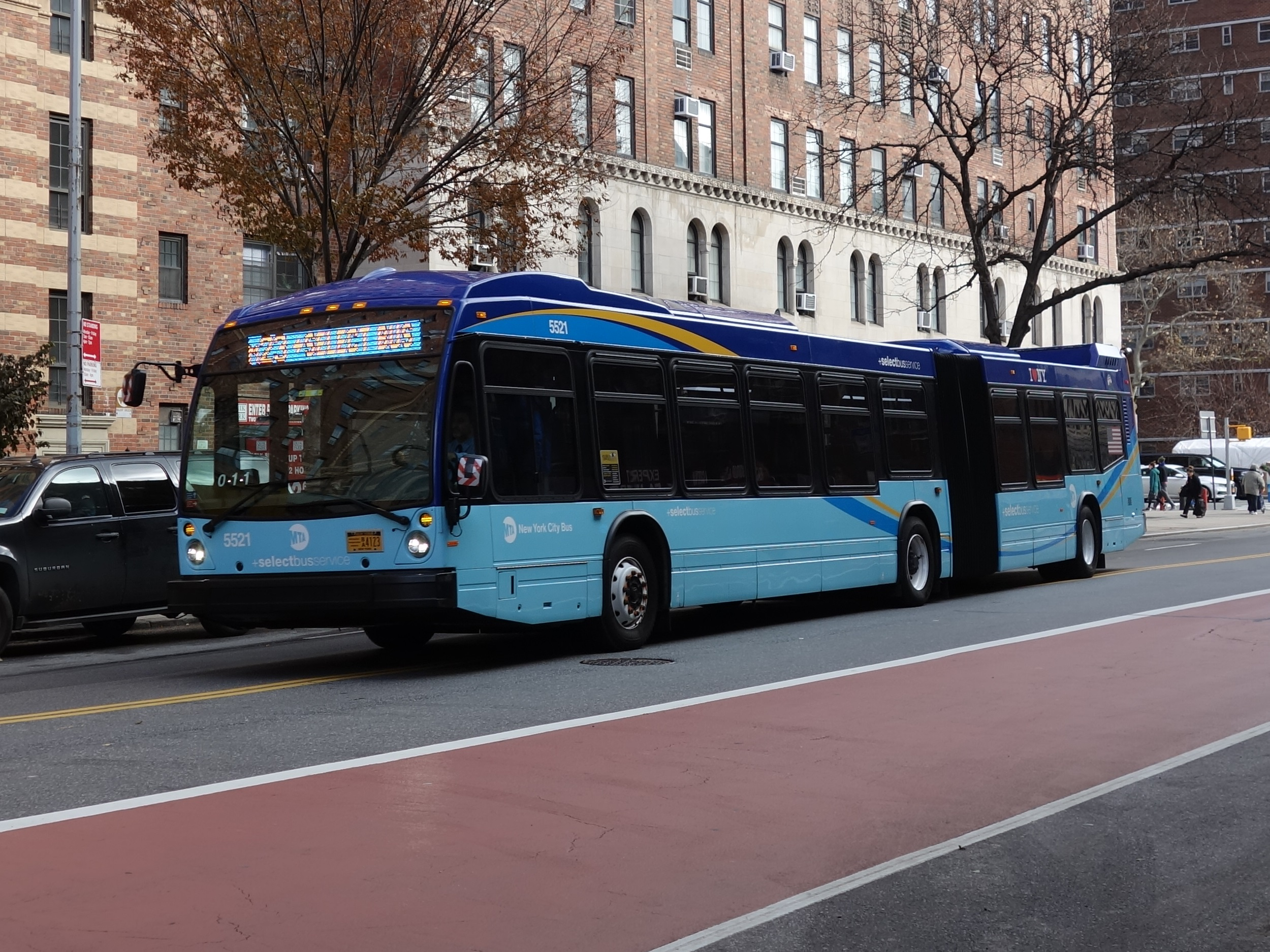

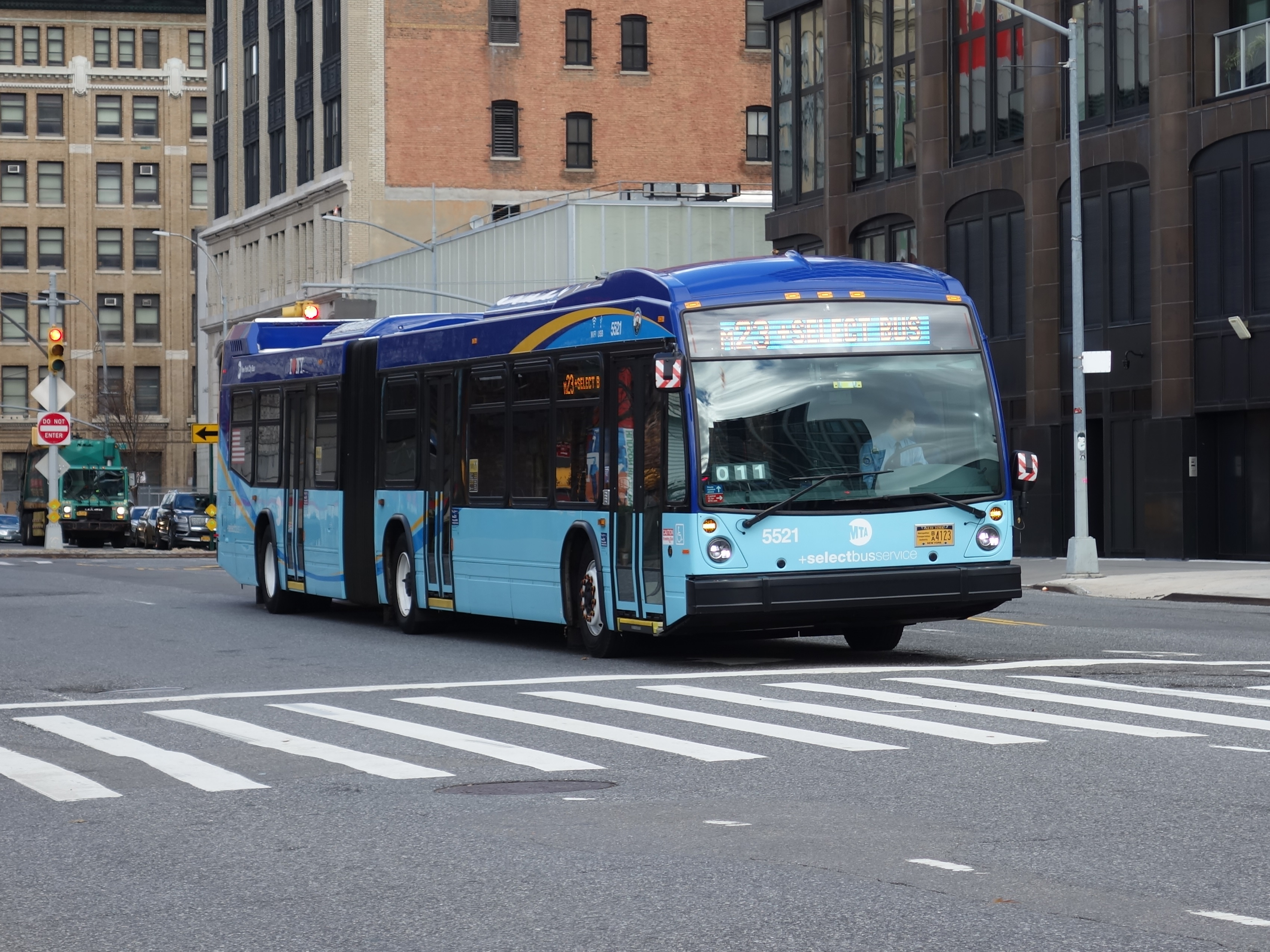
A 2018 Nova Bus LFS Articulated (5521) on the M23 SBS on 23rd Street between 9th & 10th Aves (top), and at 11th Avenue (bottom), in November 2018

For most of its length, the M23 uses 23rd Street to travel crosstown. There is a one-block stretch of the route, between 11th and 12th Avenues, that runs along 24th Street; this is because the M23 needs to access a bus loop at Chelsea Piers, which is along the West Side Highway near 22nd Street, but it must use 24th Street since 23rd Street ends at 11th Avenue. The westbound route between Avenue C and 1st Avenue runs along 20th Street because its eastern terminal is in the southbound lanes of Avenue C in Stuyvesant Town–Peter Cooper Village.

=== Connections ===
The M23 intersects with every New York City Bus line that it encounters along its crosstown route, as well as some New York City Subway stations. Along Avenue C and 20th Street in Peter Cooper Village, in both directions, the M23 shares bus stops with the M9 route. At the intersections of both 20th and 23rd Streets with 1st Avenue, the northbound M15 and M15 Select Bus Service (SBS) has stops on 1st Avenue, close to the M23 stops. The corresponding southbound M15/M15 SBS stops are at 2nd Avenue. The southbound M9 and eastbound M34A SBS share an eastbound run with the M23 between 2nd Avenue and FDR Drive. At 3rd Avenue, the M101, M102, and M103 are all nearby. The northbound M1, M2, and M3 stop on Park Avenue. The 23rd Street–Baruch College subway station of the IRT Lexington Avenue Line, under Park Avenue, serves the 6 and <6> services. At 5th Avenue and Broadway, near Madison Square, there is a transfer to the southbound M1, M2, and M3; the southbound M5, and the 23rd Street station of the BMT Broadway Line (serving the N, R, and W routes).

At 6th Avenue, the M23 encounters the northbound M5 and M7; the 23rd Street station of the IND Sixth Avenue Line, along the F, <F>, and M services; and the 23rd Street station of the PATH, next to the Sixth Avenue Line station. The intersection with 7th Avenue provides a transfer to the downtown M7 and M20, and the 23rd Street station of the IRT Broadway–Seventh Avenue Line, served by the 1 train. At 8th Avenue, the northbound M20 is nearby, as is the 23rd Street station of the IND Eighth Avenue Line's C and E routes. Transfers to the southbound and northbound M11 are made at 9th and 10th Avenues, respectively. Finally, at 11th Avenue just east of the M23's terminus, there is a transfer to both directions of the M12 bus.

A total of 14 local or Select Bus Service routes intersect the M23, as well as the PATH and five subway stations. In addition, 28 express bus routes run along 23rd Street, and thus, a non-free transfer either to or from the M23.

=== Stops ===
Station Street traveled	Direction	Connections
12th Avenue Chelsea Piers	Westbound terminus, Eastbound station	NYC Bus: M12 (northbound only)
12th Avenue West 24th Street	Bidirectional	NYC Bus: M12 (northbound only)
11th Avenue West 23rd Street	Bidirectional	NYC Bus: M12 (southbound only)
10th Avenue West 23rd Street	Bidirectional	NYC Bus: M11 (northbound only)
9th Avenue West 23rd Street	Bidirectional	NYC Bus: M11 (southbound only)
8th Avenue West 23rd Street	Bidirectional	NYC Bus: M20 (northbound only); NYC Subway: trains at 23rd Street
7th Avenue West 23rd Street	Bidirectional	NYC Bus: M7, M20 (southbound only); NYC Subway: trains at 23rd Street
6th Avenue West 23rd Street	Bidirectional	NYC Bus: M7, M55 (northbound only); NYC Subway: trains at 23rd Street; PATH: HOB-33, JSQ-33, and JSQ-33 (via HOB) at 23rd Street
Broadway East 23rd Street	Bidirectional	NYC Bus: M1, M2, M3, M55 (all buses southbound only); NYC Subway: trains at 23rd Street
Park Avenue South East 23rd Street	Bidirectional	NYC Bus: M1, M2, M3 (northbound only); NYC Subway: trains at 23rd Street–Baruch College
Third Avenue East 23rd Street	Bidirectional	NYC Bus: M101, M102, M103
Second Avenue East 23rd Street	Bidirectional	NYC Bus: M9, M15 Local, M15 SBS, M34A SBS (southbound only)
First Avenue East 23rd Street	Bidirectional	NYC Bus: M9, M15 Local, M15 SBS (northbound only), M34A SBS
Westbound only
First Avenue East 20th Street	Westbound	NYC Bus: M9, M15 Local (northbound only)
East 20th Street Loop East 20th Street	Westbound	NYC Bus: M9 (northbound only)
Eastbound only
East 23rd Street Avenue C	Eastbound	NYC Bus: M9, M34A SBS
East 20th Street Avenue C	Eastbound terminus, westbound station	NYC Bus: M9

== History ==
=== Streetcars ===
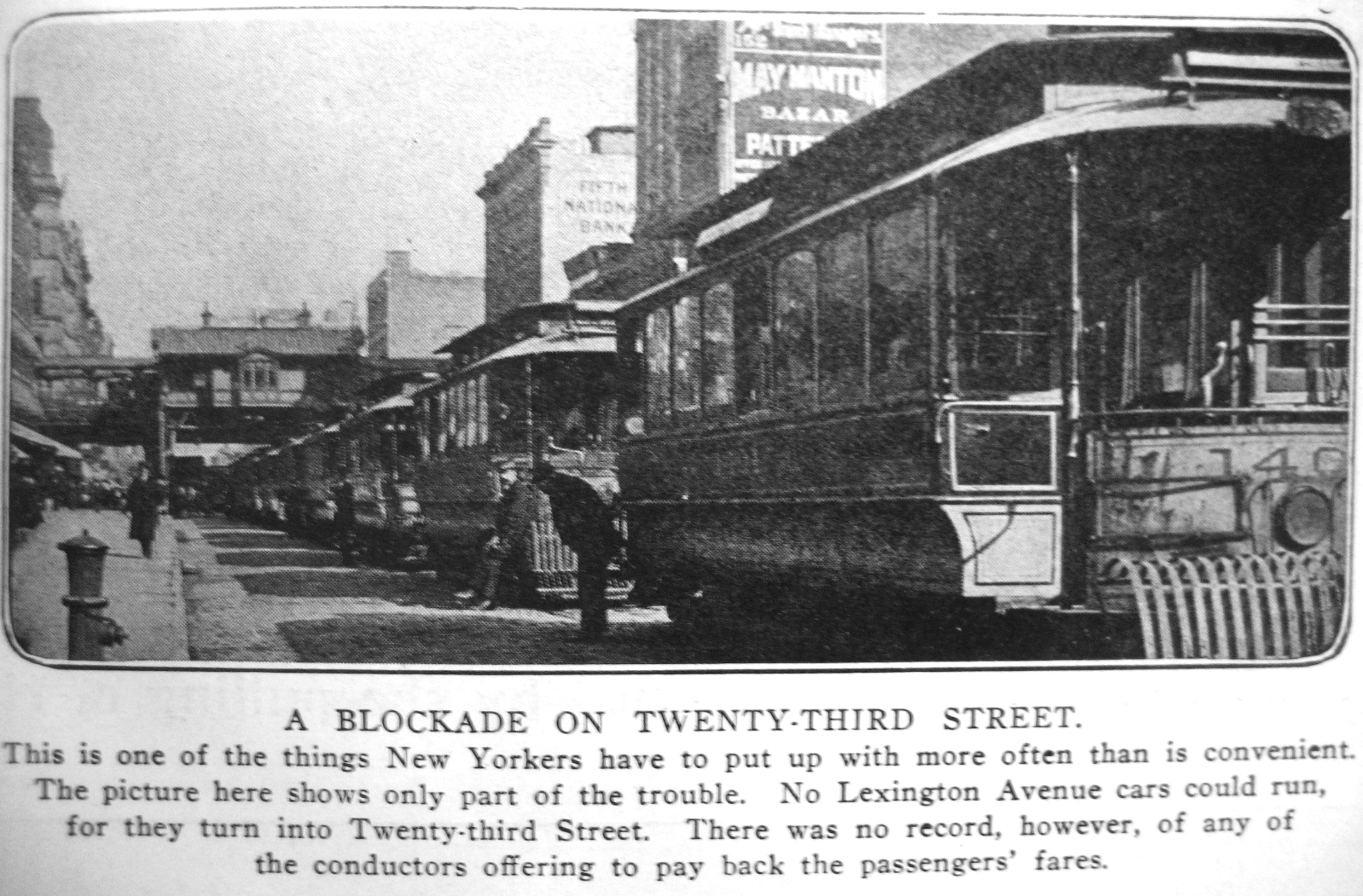
A blockade of streetcars on 23rd Street in 1903, taken from a Vanity Fair magazine article

The Twenty-third Street Railway was a street railway that was originally operated as horse cars and later electric traction. The company was chartered on January 29, 1872. Its trackage ran along 23rd Street between 13th Avenue at the Hudson River and the East River east of Avenue A, with a depot on the north side of 23rd Street between 13th and 11th Avenues. Most of this trackage was built by the Twenty-third Street Railway, with three exceptions: a double-track segment between Broadway and Fourth Avenue, built as per an 1860 grant by the Forty-second Street and Grand Street Ferry Railroad; another double-track portion between First Avenue and the former Asser Levy Place, built under another 1860 grant by the Central Park, North and East River Railroad Company; and a single-track portion between Second and First Avenues, built as per a grant awarded to the Second Avenue Railroad in 1852 and confirmed in 1854. In the last instance, the Twenty-third Street Railway removed the Second Avenue Railroad track in the middle of the street, and added double tracks on the curbside of the street, of which the eastbound track was to be shared with the Second Avenue Railroad.

The railway leased the Bleecker Street and Fulton Ferry Railroad, which ran from 14th Street on the Hudson River to Fulton Ferry on the East River, on January 10, 1876, for a duration of 99 years. Both of these railroads were leased by larger companies. The lease lasted until April 25, 1893, at which time the Twenty-third Street Railway was leased to the Houston, West Street and Pavonia Ferry Railroad. The Houston, West Street and Pavonia Ferry Railroad was consolidated into the Metropolitan Street Railway on December 12, 1893.

The Metropolitan Street Railway was leased by the Interurban Street Railway on April 1, 1902, which changed its name to the New York City Railway on February 10, 1904. That company went bankrupt in 1908, and the Metropolitan Street Railway separated on July 31. Upon consolidation, it became the 23rd Street Crosstown Line.

=== Bus service ===
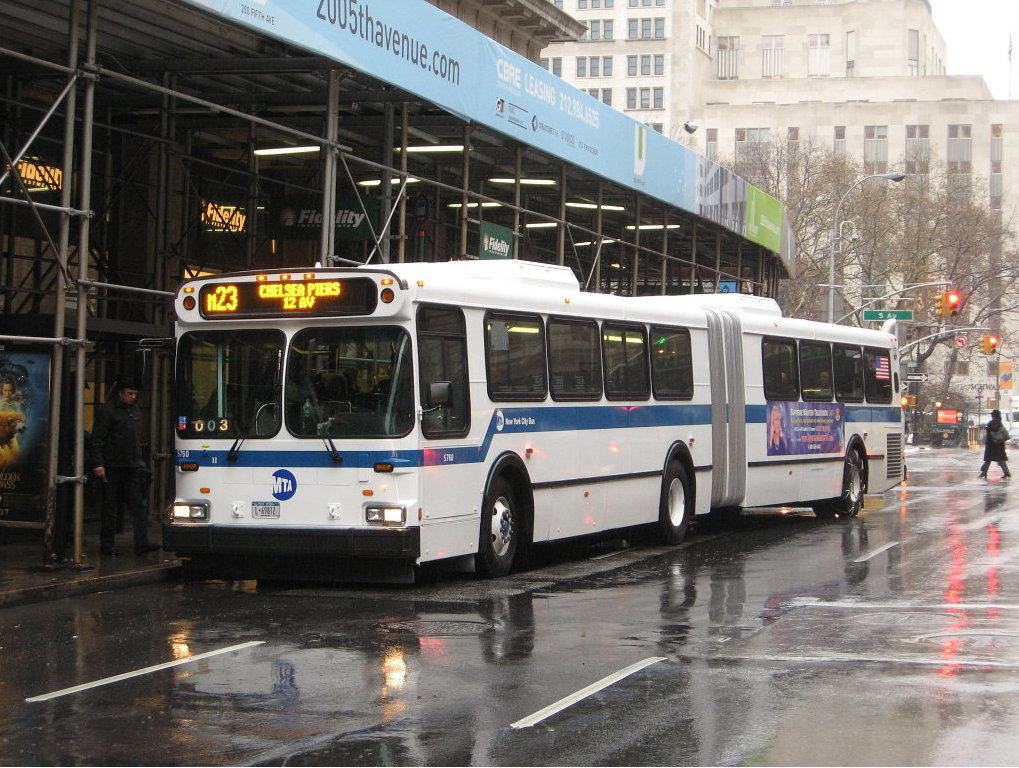
A 2004 D60HF (5760) on the Chelsea Piers-bound M23 at Fifth Avenue, prior to SBS implementation

Trolley service along the line ended on April 8, 1936. A New York City Omnibus Corporation bus route (M18-15) replaced the 23rd Street Crosstown Line trolley. The bus was taken over by the Manhattan and Bronx Surface Transit Operating Authority (MaBSTOA) in 1962. The route became the M26 on July 1, 1974 as part of the renumbering of bus routes in Manhattan. The bus route had been numbered 15, and before its renumbering there were three Manhattan routes numbered 15. The 15 Jackson Heights–Fifth Avenue was renumbered to M32 at the same time, while the M15 Second and First Avenue line retained its number. The bus was renamed the M23 to match the street it ran on in 1989.

In 2010, the M23 was one of seven local bus routes in Manhattan to participate in a PayPass smart card program. This program was a pilot program meant to find a suitable smart card technology to replace the MetroCard.

=== Select Bus Service ===
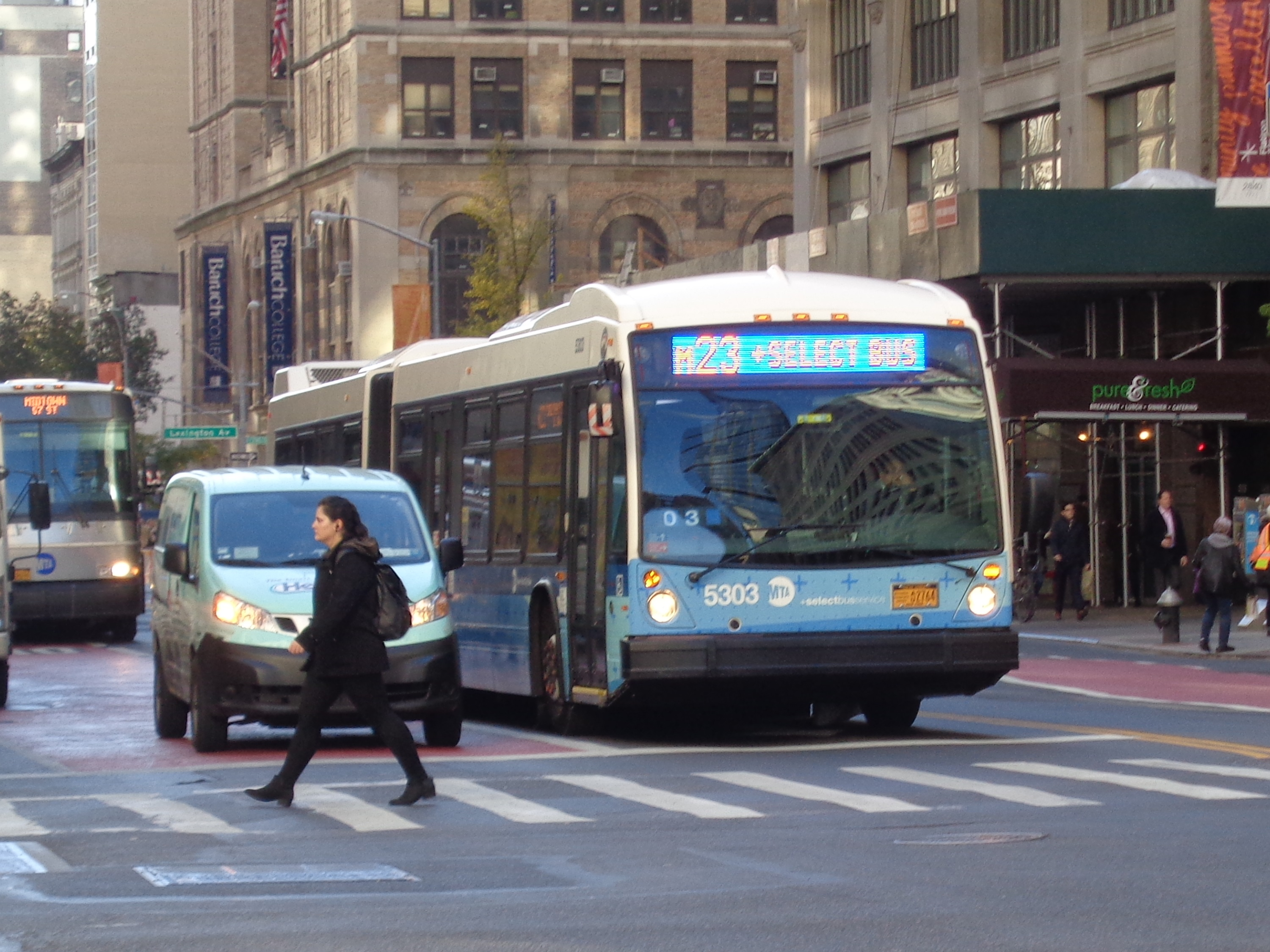
A 2012 Nova Bus LFS Articulated (5303) on the Chelsea Piers-bound M23 SBS at 23rd Street/Park Avenue in November 2017

The M23 route has been traditionally crowded, with 4,862,343 riders in 2010 and 4,075,850 riders in 2018, or 15,000 riders a day. It is also among the city's slowest bus routes, running at an average of 4.7 miles per hour (7.6 km/h) in 2000, and 3.7 miles per hour (6.0 km/h) by 2015. In 2003, the Straphangers Campaign gave the M23 the "Pokey Award" because it ran slower than any other bus route in all of New York City, at an average speed of 4 miles per hour (6.4 km/h); it also received that distinction in 2007 when it also ran at an average of 4 miles per hour (6.4 km/h), slightly faster than the average walking speed of 3 miles per hour (4.8 km/h). Rush hour bus headways on the M23 are supposed to be 4.5 to 5.5 minutes. A 2015 report found that half of the average M23 bus's time is spent either at a bus stop or stopped in traffic; that 28% of the duration of the average M23 trip is spent waiting at bus stops due to passengers boarding; and that the M23 only moves at over 15 miles per hour (24 km/h) for an average of 10% of each trip. This was exacerbated by 23rd Street's varying width of 52 to 66 feet (16 to 20 m), causing buses to need to change lanes frequently; as well as the fact that bus stops were frequently blocked by other traffic, and by double parked cars. The street was designated as a "Vision Zero Corridor" due to the high rate of injuries along the street (714 traffic-related injuries, 75 of them serious, as well as 5 deaths due to traffic incidents between 2009 and 2013).

In 2009, the Metropolitan Transportation Authority and the New York City Department of Transportation (NYCDOT) identified the M14A/D, on parallel 14th Street, as a potential corridor for Phase II of SBS, the city's bus rapid transit system, as well as finalized plans to implement SBS on the M16/M34 along the also-parallel 34th Street. The crosstown bus corridors were noted for slow travel speeds. The M23 was originally not planned to be an SBS route, but in 2008, it had been part of a pilot program in which 30 articulated, redesigned SBS buses were rolled out on the M23 for some time.

After lengthy consultation, the M23 was converted to SBS on November 6, 2016, with all-door boarding, off-board fare payment, dedicated New York City bus lanes, and BusTime-equipped countdown clocks at some stops. This is keeping in line with other SBS routes with the same upgrades, which have seen their average speeds increase between 10% and 25% after implementation. It replaced M23 local service at the cost of $1.7 million. The M23 SBS keeps the same route as the M23 local, with one redundant westbound stop on 5th Avenue and a bidirectional stop on Lexington Avenue being eliminated. Another bus stop, at the intersection of 20th Street and the western portion of the 20th Street Loop, was planned for elimination, but was retained after community members objected; their objections included that removing the bus stop would make it harder for the elderly residents of Peter Cooper Village to travel to the nearest M23 stop, and that the gap between stops would be 1,848 feet (563 m), or about 0.35 miles, if the stop were eliminated. The implementation plan included repainting 23rd Street so that it would have 5 lanes throughout most of its length; between 2nd and 8th Avenues, two of these lanes—one in each direction—would be bus lanes, with westbound bus lanes between 1st and 2nd Avenues, and eastbound bus lanes between 10th and 8th Avenues. The SBS plan excluded a proposal for bus lanes in the median of 23rd Street, which were proposed by three different community boards due to parking issues on 34th Street after SBS was implemented there.
