= Avenue C =

Avenue C or C Avenue may refer to:

== Transportation in New York City ==
- Avenue C (Brighton Beach Line), a local New York City Subway station in Brooklyn
- Avenue C (Brooklyn), a lettered avenue in Kensington, Brooklyn
- Avenue C (Manhattan), a north–south avenue in the Alphabet City area of East Village, Manhattan
- Avenue C Line, a local bus route in Manhattan
- Avenue C Railroad, original name of the Houston, West Street and Pavonia Ferry Railroad in lower Manhattan

== Music ==
- "Avenue C", a song on the 1966 album The Big Band by Jimmy McGriff
- "Avenue C", a song on the 1974 album Barry Manilow II
