= Seventh Avenue Line =

Seventh Avenue Line may refer to any of the following transit lines in New York City:

- IRT Broadway – Seventh Avenue Line, a New York City Subway line serving the 1, 2, and 3 trains
- Seventh Avenue Line (Brooklyn surface) (bus, formerly streetcar)
- Seventh Avenue Line (Manhattan surface) (bus, formerly streetcar)
