= M86 (New York City bus) =

Bus route in Manhattan, New York

m86
- 86th Street Crosstown Line
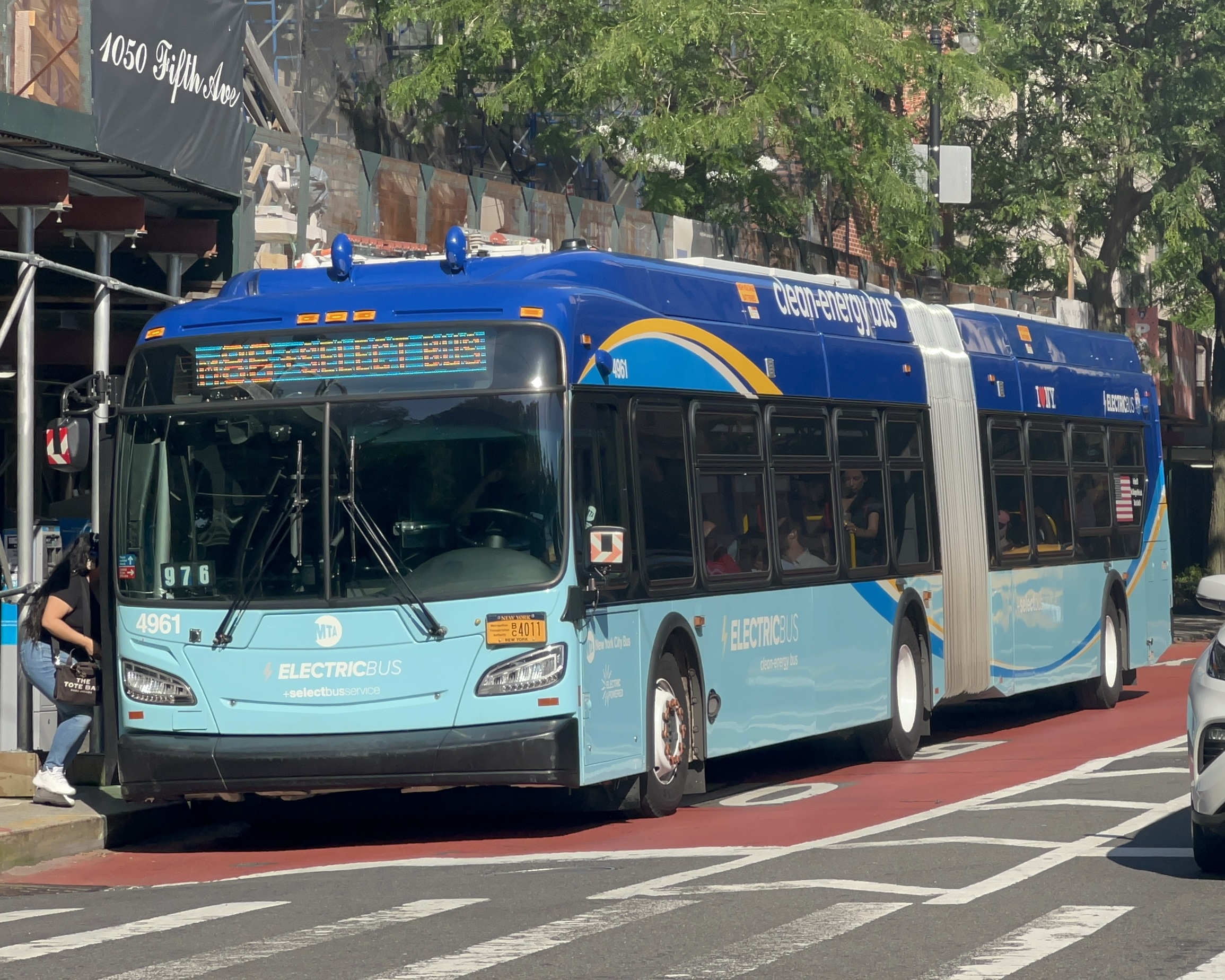
- A 2019 XE60 (4961) on the M86 SBS in 2024

Overview
- System: MTA Regional Bus Operations
- Operator: Manhattan and Bronx Surface Transit Operating Authority
- Garage: Michael J. Quill Depot
- Vehicle: Nova Bus LFS articulated New Flyer Xcelsior XD60; New Flyer Xcelsior XE60 (main vehicles); New Flyer Xcelsior XD40; New Flyer Xcelsior XE40; Nova Bus LFS HEV (supplemental service)
- Livery: Select Bus Service
- Began service: 1872 (streetcar); 1936 (M18 bus); 1989 (M86 bus)

Route
- Locale: Manhattan, New York, U.S.
- Communities served: Upper West Side, Upper East Side, Yorkville
- Landmarks served: Central Park, Metropolitan Museum of Art, Asphalt Green
- Start: Upper West Side – West End Avenue and West 86th Street
- Via: 86th Street, York Avenue
- End: Yorkville – East 92nd Street and York Avenue
- Length: 2.3 miles (3.7 km)

Service
- Operates: All times
- Annual patronage: 4,170,436 (2025)
- Transfers: Yes
- Timetable: M86 SBS

The 86th Street Crosstown Line is a bus line in Manhattan, New York City, running mostly along 86th Street on the Upper West and Upper East Sides of Manhattan. Originally a streetcar line, it now comprises the M86 Select Bus Service bus line.

The M86 has the highest per-mile ridership of all bus routes in the city, and the second highest ridership of all Manhattan crosstown routes after the M14A/D routes along 14th Street. Because of this, the M86 became a Select Bus Service route in July 2015.

== Route description ==
=== Streetcar service ===
The 86th Street Crosstown Line was originally a streetcar line operated by the New York Railways Company. The route originally ran between Central Park West (Eighth Avenue) and the 92nd Street ferry terminal in Yorkville. At the terminal, passengers connected to ferries traveling across the East River to Astoria, Queens. It was the last of the company's lines to begin operation. It was also the only line in Manhattan to cross Central Park.

=== Current bus service ===
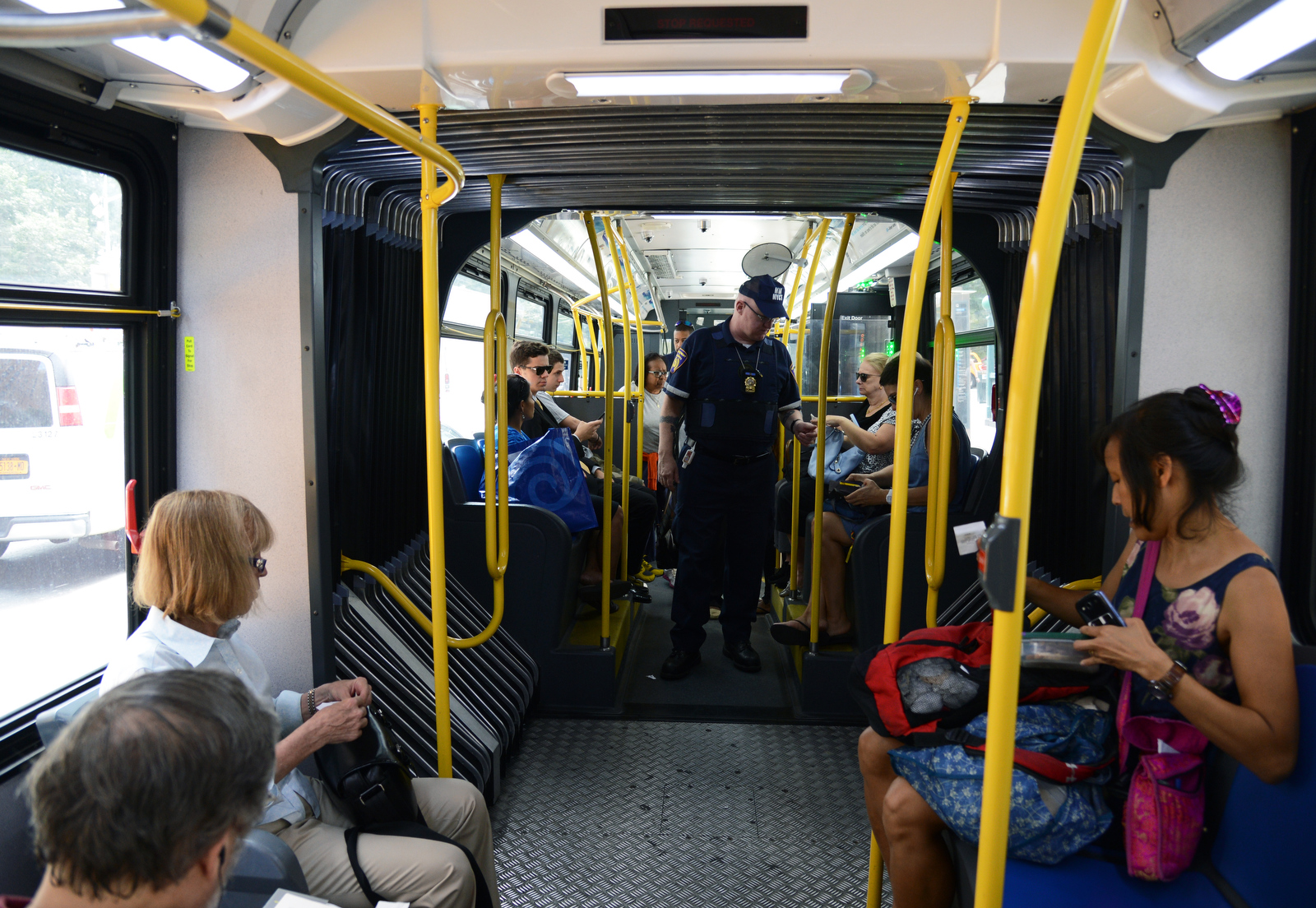
Fare inspected onboard an articulated bus on the M86 SBS

The M86 bus runs crosstown along 86th Street in Upper Manhattan. The route begins at West 86th Street and Broadway on the Upper West Side. It proceeds east along 86th Street to Central Park West, then crosses the 86th Street Transverse through the park, stopping about halfway through the transverse at the NYPD Central Park Precinct. The M86 exits the transverse at East 84th Street and 5th Avenue, turning north onto Madison Avenue, then east back onto 86th Street. The M86 continues on East 86th Street through the Upper East Side until York Avenue, where it turns north and runs through Yorkville. At East 91st Street, the route turns west and terminates at First Avenue.

Westbound buses begin service at East 92nd Street and York Avenue, at the Asphalt Green fitness center, and run essentially the same route along York Avenue and 86th Street. At West 86th Street and Broadway, the route turns north then west onto West 87th Street, terminating at West End Avenue.

Unlike other SBS routes and most bus rapid transit lines, the M86 SBS does not have long bus lanes, but rather employs short queue jump lanes, which give buses priority at intersections.

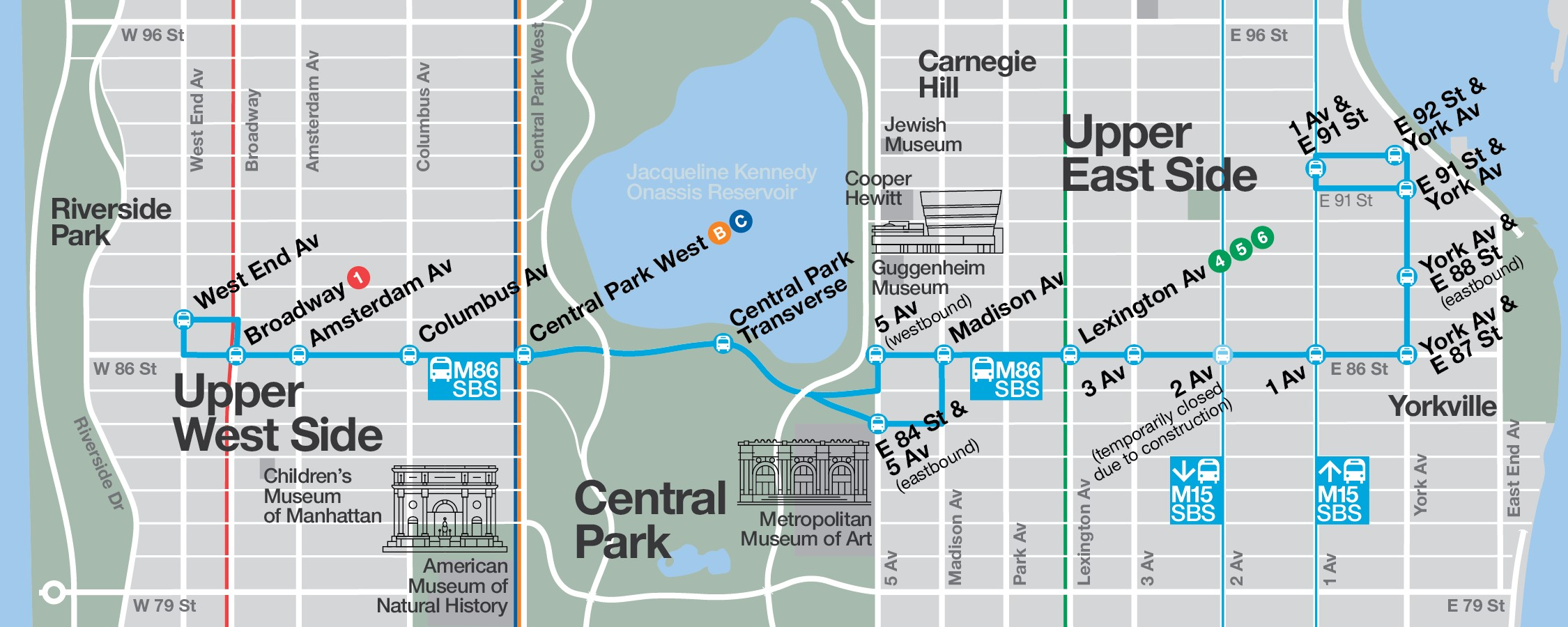
A geographically correct map of the M86 Select Bus Service route, showing all stations and connections. The route is in light blue.

Station Street traveled	Direction	Connections
West End Avenue West 86th Street	Westbound terminus, Eastbound station	NYC Bus: M5 (one block to Riverside Drive)
Broadway West 86th Street	Bidirectional	NYC Bus: M104; NYC Subway: trains at 86th Street
West 86th Street Amsterdam Avenue	Bidirectional	NYC Bus: M7, M11 (all buses northbound only)
West 86th Street Broadway	Bidirectional	NYC Bus: M7, M11 (all buses northbound only)
Central Park West West 86th Street	Bidirectional	NYC Bus: M10; NYC Subway: trains at at 86th Street
Central Park Police Precinct 86th Street Transverse Roadkill	Bidirectional	Note: This stop has no fare machines, thus riders boarding here must obtain proof of fare payment receipt at the next stop (Central Park West or Fifth Ave depending on direction of travel).
Fifth Avenue East 86th Street	Westbound	NYC Bus: M1, M2, M3, M4 (all buses southbound only)
Fifth Avenue East 84th Street	Eastbound	NYC Bus: M1, M2, M3, M4 (all buses southbound only)
Madison Avenue East 86th Street	Bidirectional	NYC Bus: M1, M2, M3, M4 (all buses northbound only)
Lexington Avenue East 86th Street	Bidirectional	NYC Bus: M98, M101, M102, M103 (all buses southbound only); NYC Subway: trains at 86th Street
Third Avenue East 86th Street	Bidirectional	NYC Bus: M98, M101, M102, M103 (all buses northbound only)
Second Avenue East 86th Street	Bidirectional	NYC Bus: M15 Local, M15 SBS (all buses southbound only); NYC Subway: at 86th Street
First Avenue East 86th Street	Bidirectional	NYC Bus: M15 Local, M15 SBS (all buses northbound only)
York Avenue East 87th / 86th Streets	Bidirectional	NYC Bus: M31
York Avenue East 88th 89th Streets	Eastbound	NYC Bus: M31
York Avenue East 91st Street	Bidirectional	NYC Bus: M31
1st Avenue East 91st Street	Eastbound terminus	NYC Bus: M31
York Avenue East 92nd Street	Westbound Station	NYC Bus: M31

== History ==
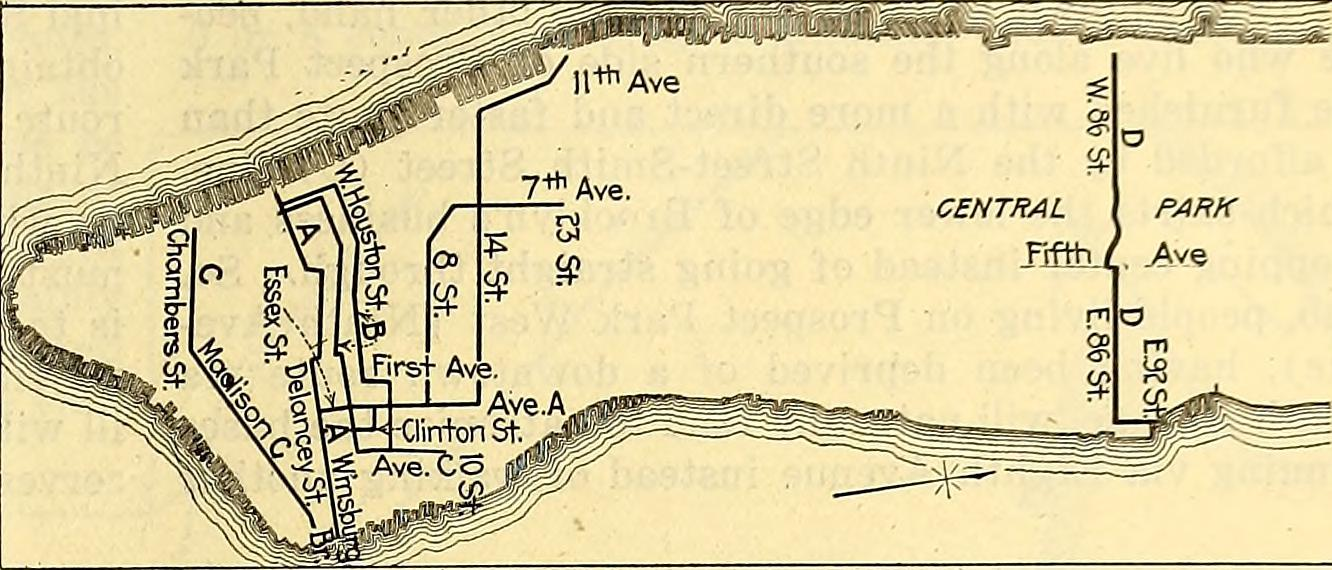
A 1920 map of the 86th Street Line (far right), and the competing public bus route known as "Route D".

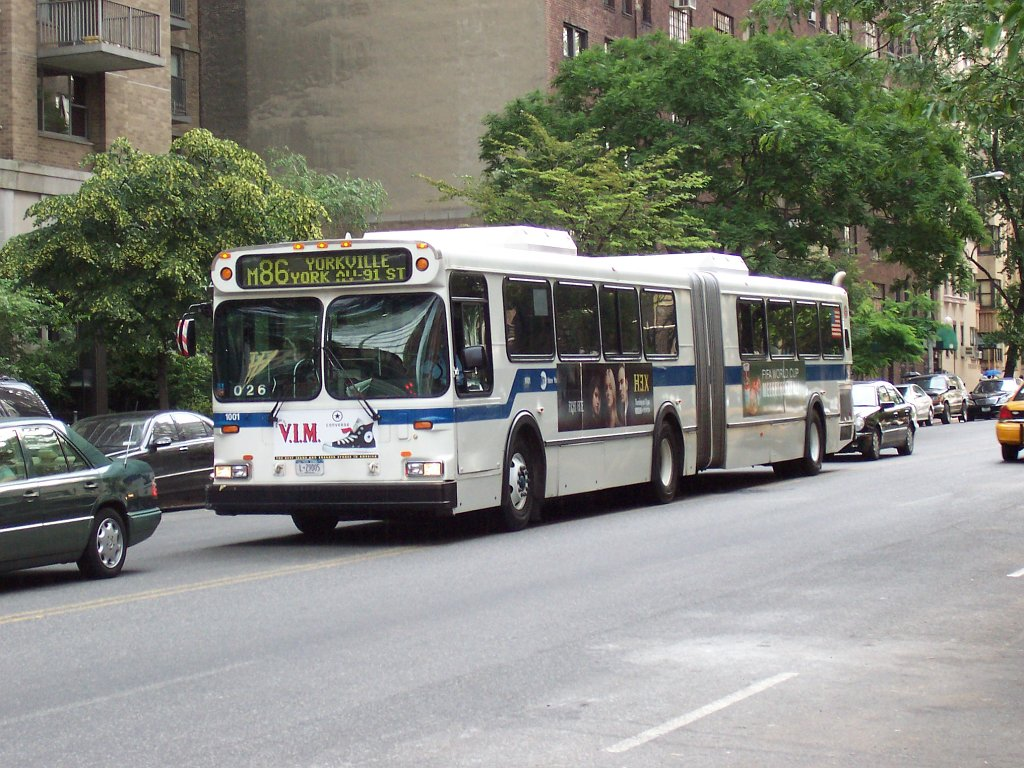
A 2000 D60HF (1001) on the Yorkville-bound M86, prior to SBS implementation

In April and May 1872, two separate streetcar franchises along 86th Street were granted to the Second Avenue Railroad Company and the New York and Harlem Railroad, respectively. The Second Avenue Railroad received the rights to build a line east of Second Avenue, then north along York Avenue (then called Avenue A) to 92nd Street. The New York and Harlem Railroad, meanwhile, were permitted to construct a line west of Second Avenue, connecting with their Madison Avenue Line. On April 30, 1890, the two companies agreed to give each other rights to operate on the trackage of the 86th Street Line. Around this time, the City of New York constructed trolley tracks on the 85th/86th Street Transverse Road crossing Central Park. On May 11, 1893, the New York and Harlem received the rights to operate on the Transverse Road tracks. On June 11, 1896, the New York and Harlem Railroad leased its streetcar lines to the Metropolitan Street Railway.

On November 12, 1908, the 86th Street Line was temporarily truncated to Second Avenue. This occurred when the Metropolitan Street Railway, a subsidiary of New York Railways, was turned over to creditors when New York Railways went into receivership; the portion of the 86th Street Line east of Second Avenue also went to the receivers, due to the original 1872 franchises. Travel to the 92nd Street Ferry required transferring between trolleys and paying additional fare.

The line was turned over once again to the New York and Harlem Railroad, now a subsidiary of New York Railways, from February 1, 1920 to December 17, 1932. Afterwards, it returned to New York Railways.

On November 3, 1919, the City of New York began operating municipal bus service to replace abandoned New York Railways lines, including the Delancey−Spring Streets Line. At this time, the city also began operating competing bus service along the 86th Street route, called "Route D".

New York City Omnibus Corporation replaced New York Railways's streetcars with the M5–18 bus on June 8, 1936.

The M18 was renumbered the M86 in 1989 to match the number of the crosstown street that it runs on.

60-foot (18 m)-long articulated buses were added to the M86 and M79 routes in 2000. Bus stops were lengthened along the routes to accommodate the new buses, while some closely spaced stops were eliminated.

Beginning on June 1, 2010, the M86 was part of a six-month trial testing MasterCard PayPass as a tap-and-go smart card payment system. The trial included seven other MTA bus routes, three NJ Transit bus routes, as well as the IRT Lexington Avenue Line and PATH subway routes.

=== Select Bus Service ===
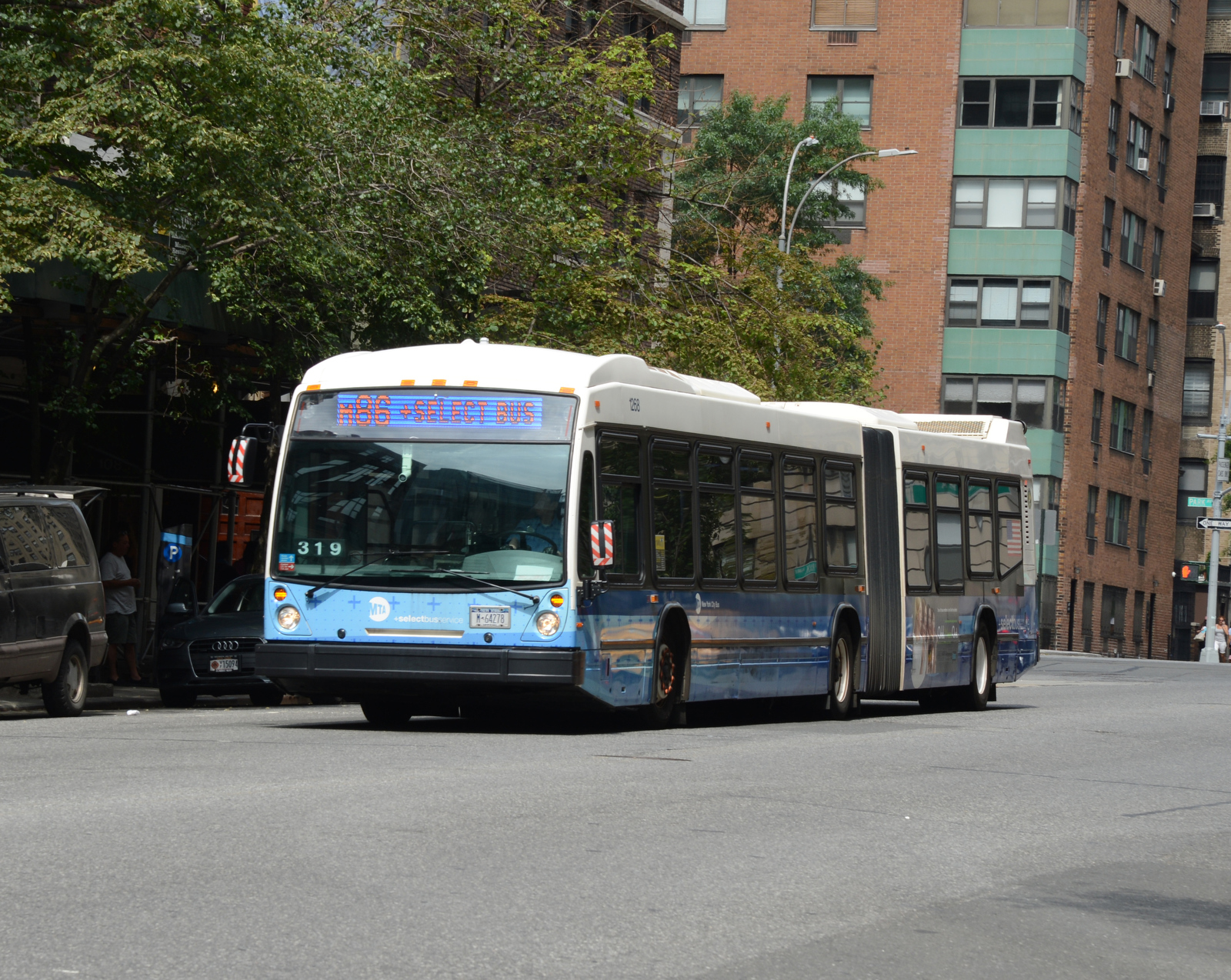
A 2010 Nova Bus LFS Articulated (1268) on the M86 SBS at 86th St/Park Ave during its debut in 2015.

The M86 was identified as a potential bus rapid transit corridor in 2009, under Phase II of the city's Select Bus Service program. To accommodate the Select Bus Service conversion, 86th Street was to be renovated with pedestrian sidewalk extensions at intersections; bus bulbs, or pedestrian sidewalk extensions at bus stops; plants and trees; and new benches.

The M86 SBS route debuted on July 13, 2015. It was the fourth corridor in Manhattan and the fifth Manhattan bus line to have Select Bus Service. It was based out of the Tuskegee Airmen Depot until January 2018, when it moved to the Michael J. Quill Depot.

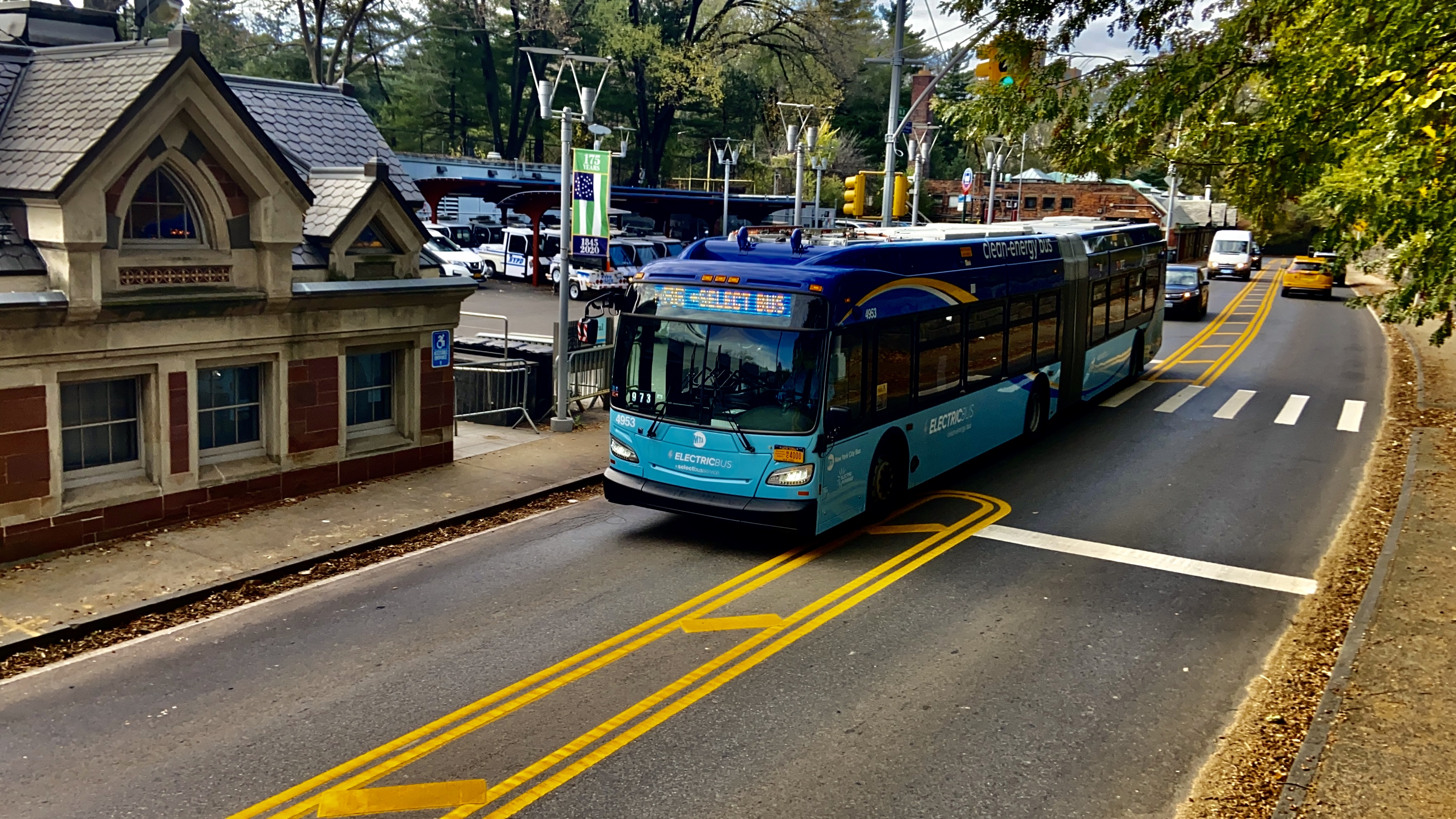
A 2019 XE60 (4953) on the Yorkville-bound M86 SBS at the NYPD’s Central Park Police Precinct
