= Lenox Avenue Line =

Lenox Avenue Line may refer to either of two transit lines in upper Manhattan:

- IRT Lenox Avenue Line, a rapid transit subway line established in 1904
- Lenox Avenue Line (surface), a streetcar line established in 1895, converted to bus routes in 1935
