= Houston, West Street and Pavonia Ferry Railroad =

The Houston, West Street and Pavonia Ferry Railroad was a street railway company in the U.S. state of New York. It owned and operated a system in Lower Manhattan, and became part of the Metropolitan Street Railway.

== History ==
The Avenue C Railroad was chartered June 3, 1874 (or December 18, 1868), and its original line, the Avenue C Line from the Green Point Ferry at the foot of East 10th Street mainly along Avenue C, Houston Street, and West Street to the Pavonia Ferry at the foot of Chambers Street, opened on October 18, 1869. By 1879, it had extended its line north on Avenue C from 10th Street, west on 17th Street and 18th Street, north over the Central Park, North and East River Railroad (First Avenue and East Belt Line) on Avenue A, 23rd Street, and 1st Avenue, west on 35th Street and 36th Street, north on Lexington Avenue, and west on 42nd Street to Grand Central Terminal. The Third Avenue Railroad also used the trackage on 42nd Street by 1884. On June 3, 1874, it was merged with the Broadway and Seventh Avenue Railroad to form the Houston, West Street and Pavonia Ferry Railroad.

It began leasing other lines in 1892:

- Sixth Avenue Railroad, February 1, 1892
- Ninth Avenue Railroad, April 12, 1892
- Central Park, North and East River Railroad, October 14, 1892 (also leased to the Metropolitan Crosstown Railway at the same time)
- Twenty-Third Street Railway, April 25, 1893
  - Bleecker Street and Fulton Ferry Railroad, leased to the 23rd Street Railway January 10, 1876
- Broadway and Seventh Avenue Railroad, June 30, 1893
  - Broadway Surface Railroad, leased to the Broadway and 7th Avenue Railroad in 1889
- South Ferry Railroad, June 30, 1893

On December 12, 1893, the Houston, West Street and Pavonia Ferry Railroad was merged (with the Broadway Surface Railroad and South Ferry Railroad) into the Metropolitan Street Railway. The properties were leased to the Interurban Street Railway in 1902, renamed the New York City Railway in 1904. The Metropolitan Street Railway became independent in 1908; the Central Park, North and East River Railroad was separated (and later acquired by the Third Avenue Railway), while the other companies stayed with it.

== Lines ==
The Houston, West Street and Pavonia Ferry Railroad operated the following lines:

- First Avenue and East Belt Line, from the Central Park, North and East River Railroad
- Sixth Avenue Line, from the South Ferry Railroad and Sixth Avenue Railroad
- Seventh Avenue Line and Broadway Line from the Broadway Surface Railroad and Broadway and Seventh Avenue Railroad
- Ninth Avenue Line, from the Ninth Avenue Railroad
- West Belt Line, from the Central Park, North and East River Railroad
- Bleecker Street Line, from the Bleecker Street and Fulton Ferry Railroad
- Avenue C Line, its original line
- 23rd Street Crosstown Line, from the Twenty-Third Street Railway
- 59th Street Crosstown Line, from the Central Park, North and East River Railroad

== See also ==
- Pavonia Ferry
