= Forty-second Street and Grand Street Ferry Railroad =

The Forty-second Street and Grand Street Ferry Railroad was a horse-drawn streetcar line in Manhattan, New York City, United States. It ran from the 42nd Street Ferry on the Hudson River to the Grand Street Ferry on the East River. The line was distinguished by a light green light.

At least until 1879, the tracks ran along 42nd Street, Tenth Avenue, 34th Street, Broadway, 23rd Street, Fourth Avenue, 14th Street, Avenue A, (using Second Street westbound to cut the corner), Houston Street, Cannon Street/Goerck Street (eastbound/westbound) and Grand Street.

== History ==
The railroad was chartered on February 16, 1862 (some sources say 1863).

In October 1863, the New York and Harlem Railroad, which had tracks down the middle of Fourth Avenue, took the Forty-second Street and Grand Street Ferry Railroad to court to prevent them from laying a track on each side of Fourth Avenue (between 14th Street and 23rd Street). The NY&H charged that the new tracks would obstruct access between their line and the sidewalk, and claimed exclusive rights to lay track on Fourth Avenue. The defendant argued that it had the same right as anyone else to any part of Fourth Avenue not in use by the NY&H. Since the railroad began to operate, it presumably won the case.

On April 6, 1893, the Metropolitan Crosstown Railroad leased the line; the lessee merged with the Metropolitan Street Railway on May 14, 1894. That company was leased to the Interurban Street Railway on April 8, 1902.

Eventually, the line was not operated as a through line. Instead, the trackage was used for the 42nd Street Crosstown Line, 34th Street Crosstown Line, 23rd Street Crosstown Line, and 14th Street Crosstown Line.

A special interest group called "Vision42" has been established in the 21st Century to advocate the return of light rail to 42nd Street.
