= New York Railways Company =

American public transport operator

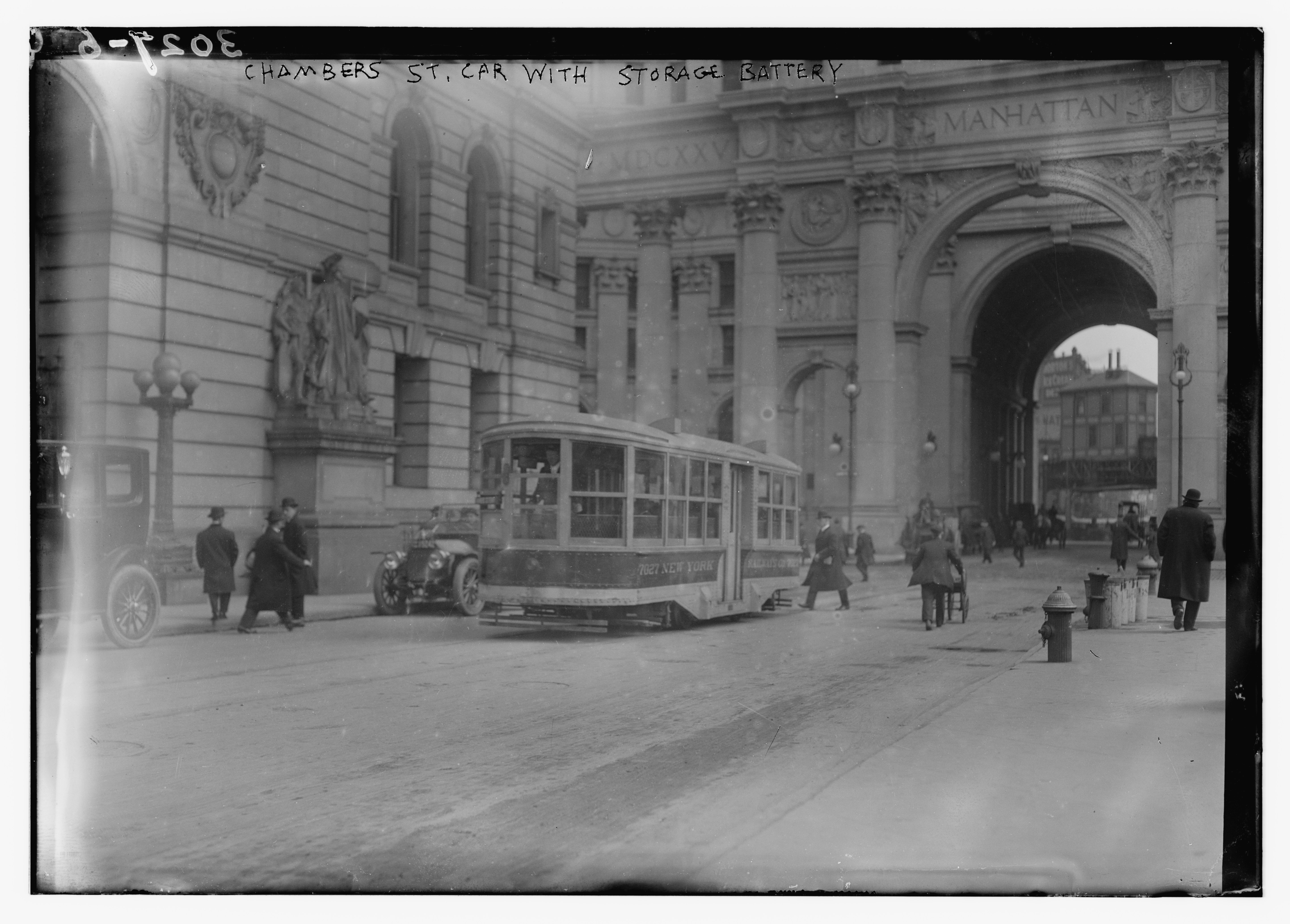
A New York Railways streetcar with a storage battery on Chambers Street

Map of the 1911 system

The New York Railways Company operated street railways in Manhattan, New York City, between 1911 and 1925. The company went into receivership in 1919 and control was passed to the New York Railways Corporation in 1925 after which all of its remaining lines were replaced with bus routes.

== History ==
The New York Railways Company was incorporated December 30, 1911 and operated the following lines on or after 1911.

North–south lines

- Lexington Avenue Line
- Lexington-Lenox Avenue Line
- Fourth and Madison Avenues Line, New York and Harlem Railroad from 1920 to 1932
- Broadway Line
- Sixth Avenue Line
- Sixth Avenue Ferry Line, discontinued in 1919
- Sixth and Amsterdam Avenues Line, discontinued in 1919
- Seventh Avenue Line, crossed the Williamsburg Bridge to Brooklyn until 1919
- Eighth Avenue Line, Eighth Avenue Railroad after 1919
- Ninth and Amsterdam Avenues Line, Ninth Avenue Railroad after 1919
- Broadway and Columbus Avenue Line
- Broadway and Amsterdam Avenue Line, discontinued in 1919

Crosstown lines

- Madison Street Line, discontinued in 1919
- Canal Street Crosstown Line
- Spring and Delancey Streets Line, discontinued in 1931
- Avenue C Line, discontinued in 1919
- Bleecker Street Line, discontinued in 1917
- Eighth Street Crosstown Line
- 14th Street Crosstown Line
- 17th and 18th Streets Crosstown Line, discontinued in 1913
- 23rd Street Crosstown Line
- 34th Street Crosstown Line
- 86th Street Crosstown Line, New York and Harlem Railroad from 1920 to 1932
- 116th Street Crosstown Line
- 145th Street Crosstown Line

The Eighth Avenue Railroad and Ninth Avenue Railroad were split in July and on October 1, and the New York and Harlem Railroad (City Line) lease was canceled on February 1, 1920. During receivership, the process of abandoning unprofitable lines continued, as the last four storage battery lines - the Avenue C Line, Spring and Delancey Streets Line, Madison Street Line, and Sixth Avenue Ferry Line - were discontinued on September 21, 1919.

Bus routes managed by the city, soon known as Mayor John Hylan's "emergency bus lines", replaced the rail lines. The Spring and Delancey Streets Line was soon ordered resumed by the courts, and operated until 1931.

New York Railways Company entered receivership on March 20, 1919 after an application for a fare increase was denied.

Operation was taken over by the New York Railways Corporation on May 1, 1925.

== Early history ==
The first streetcars in Manhattan were the horse cars of the New York and Harlem Railroad, which began operations on Bowery on November 26, 1832. By the end of 1865, Manhattan had eleven north–south lines on most of the major avenues, and several crosstown lines, operated by twelve companies. This number had increased to about twenty companies by 1886, with only two leases in effect at the time: the One Hundred and Twenty-fifth Street Railroad to the Third Avenue Railroad (1870) and the Bleecker Street and Fulton Ferry Railroad to the Twenty-third Street Railway (1876).

A group of Philadelphia businessmen headed by Peter A. B. Widener, Thomas Dolan, and William L. Elkins incorporated the Metropolitan Traction Company in New Jersey on February 19, 1886. This holding company immediately started acquiring the Manhattan street railways, starting by buying the Broadway and Seventh Avenue Railroad, Houston, West Street and Pavonia Ferry Railroad, and Chambers Street and Grand Street Ferry Railroad in June 1886, forming a system of three north–south and two crosstown lines. Added to this system were the South Ferry Railroad in January 1889, the Twenty-third Street Railway in March 1890, the Broadway Railway in October 1890, and the Metropolitan Cross-Town Railway in March 1891.

== Metropolitan Traction Company ==
A new Metropolitan Traction Company of New York, with almost twice the capitalization of the old company, took over on August 4, 1892, and continued to buy street railroads: the Central Park, North and East River Railroad (minority interest) in August 1892, the Forty-second Street and Grand Street Ferry Railroad in March 1893, the Thirty-fourth Street and Eleventh Avenue Railroad in April 1893, the Columbus and Ninth Avenue Railroad and Lexington Avenue and Pavonia Ferry Railroad in May 1893, the Fulton Street Railroad in October 1895, the Twenty-eighth and Twenty-ninth Streets Crosstown Railroad in September 1896, and the Central Crosstown Railroad (which had leased the Christopher and Tenth Street Railroad in 1890) in May 1897.

The Traction Company also began leasing its subsidiaries to each other, starting with the leases to the Houston, West Street and Pavonia Ferry Railroad of the Broadway and Seventh Avenue Railroad (May 13, 1890), the Chambers Street and Grand Street Ferry Railroad (January 31, 1891), and the Twenty-third Street Railway, including its lease of the Bleecker Street and Fulton Ferry Railroad (April 25, 1893). Two companies not owned by the Traction Company - the Sixth Avenue Railroad and Ninth Avenue Railroad - were leased to the Houston on February 1 and March 12, 1892. The minority-owned Central Park, North and East River Railroad and majority-owned Forty-second Street and Grand Street Ferry Railroad were leased to not only the Houston, but also the Metropolitan Cross-Town Railway, on October 14, 1892, and April 6, 1893. The Houston merged with the Broadway Railway and South Ferry Railroad on December 12, 1893, forming the Metropolitan Street Railway Company. That company was merged with the Lexington Avenue and Pavonia Ferry Railroad and Metropolitan Cross-Town Railway on May 28, 1894, creating a second company with the same name, and a third Metropolitan Street Railway was formed on November 12, 1895, when it was merged with the Columbus and Ninth Avenue Railroad. The Metropolitan leased two other non-owned lines: the Eighth Avenue Railroad on November 23, 1895, and the New York and Harlem Railroad (City Line) on June 11, 1896. On September 16, 1897, the Metropolitan Traction Company, which had acquired most of Manhattan's street railways, was dissolved, the stock being transferred to the Metropolitan Street Railway. That company signed operating agreements with the Fulton Street Railroad on February 19, 1896 and the Thirty-fourth Street Crosstown Railway (which had been formed in March 1896 by a merger of the Thirty-fourth Street and Eleventh Avenue Railroad with its lessor, the Thirty-fourth Street Railroad) on December 21, 1896, and acquired a lease on the Second Avenue Railroad on January 28, 1898.

The only remaining company was the Third Avenue Railroad, which had built up its own system through ownership and leases. Among the company's lines were two crosstown lines on 42nd Street and 125th Street, two north–south lines on Third Avenue and Broadway, the entire street railway network of the Bronx, and a number of lines in Westchester County. The great cost of electrifying its lines brought it to bankruptcy in 1900, and the Metropolitan acquired a majority of its stock in March of that year and leased it on April 13. With this acquisition, the Metropolitan had complete control of the street railways of Manhattan and the Bronx.

== Interurban Street Railway Company ==
The Interurban Street Railway Company was incorporated on November 25, 1901, to take over the bankrupt North Mount Vernon Street Railway. The Interurban leased the overcapitalized and water-logged Metropolitan on February 14, 1902, and the newly formed Metropolitan Securities Company acquired the stock of the Interurban, which itself took over the stock of many of the Metropolitan's subsidiaries. The Interurban's name was changed to the New York City Railway Company on February 10, 1904. The Metropolitan leased the Central Crosstown Railroad, which it had owned - and through it the Christopher and Tenth Street Railroad - on February 8, 1904. On November 1, 1905, when the Fort George and Eleventh Avenue Railroad - controlled by the Metropolitan since its incorporation in 1898 - opened its line on 145th Street, it entered into an operating agreement with the New York City Railway.

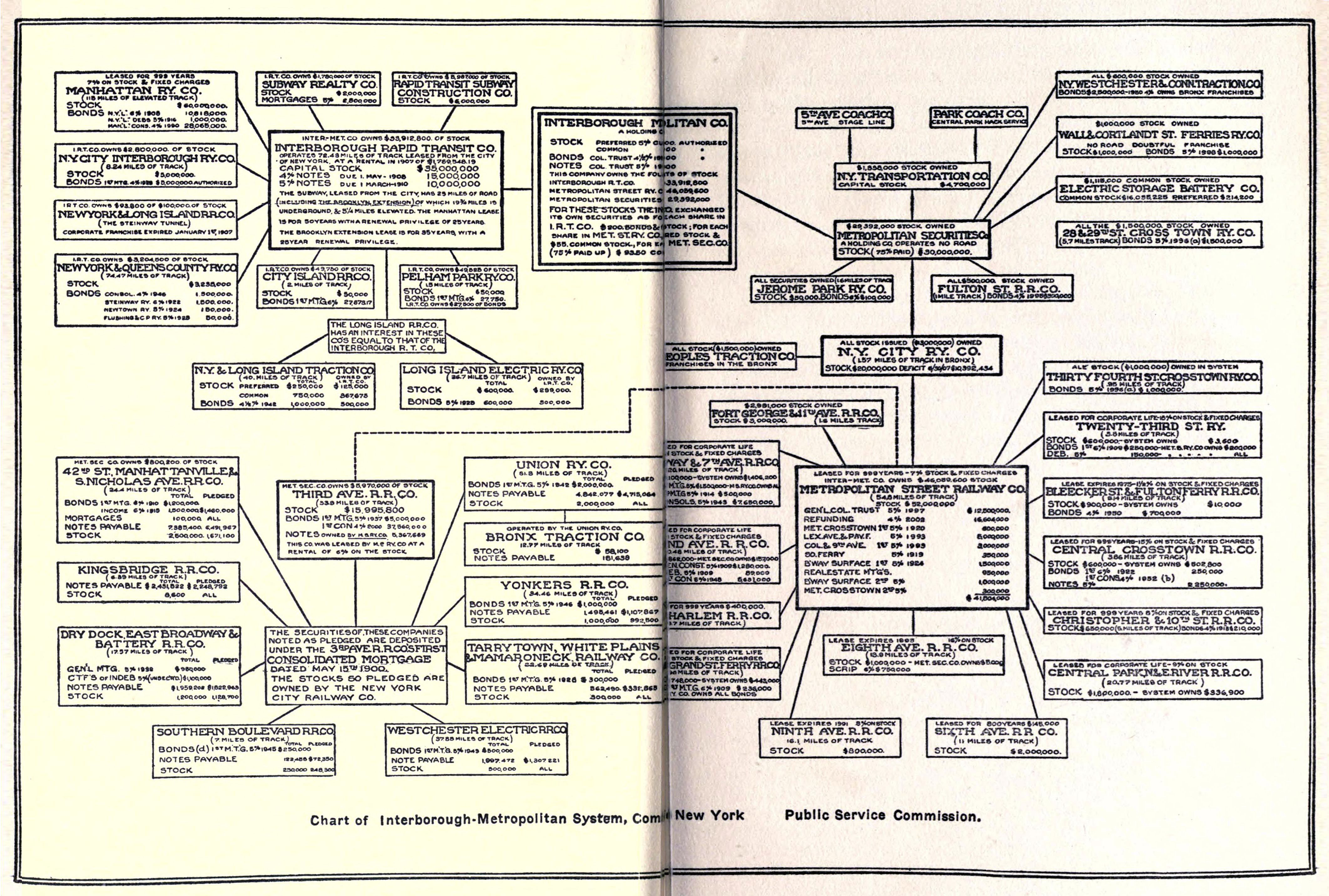
Chart of Interborough-Metropolitan System, New York, 1909

The New York City Interborough Railway began operating street railways in the Bronx and Upper Manhattan on May 31, 1906, feeding the stations of the Interborough Rapid Transit Company, which controlled it. Prior to this, in January 1906, the Interborough and Metropolitan agreed to consolidate their holdings, and the Interborough-Metropolitan Company was incorporated on January 24 and acquired a majority of the stock of the Interborough Rapid Transit Company, Metropolitan Street Railway, and Metropolitan Securities Company. The Panic of 1907 toppled the system, and on September 24, 1907, the New York City Railway entered receivership.

After entering receivership, New York City Railway's leases and operating agreements were canceled and their properties were turned over to the receivers of the subsidiaries in 1908:

- Third Avenue Railroad and its large system on January 12
- Metropolitan Street Railway on August 1
- Central Park, North and East River Railroad in August,
- Twenty-eighth and Twenty-ninth Streets Crosstown Railroad on October 1,
- Second Avenue Railroad in 1910.
- The Fulton Street Railroad was abandoned on June 1, 1908.

The remaining Metropolitan Street Railway lines were operated by the receivers until January 1, 1912, when they were turned over to the Interborough Consolidated Corporation-controlled

== See also ==
Cable Building (New York City)
