= Lenox Avenue Line (surface) =

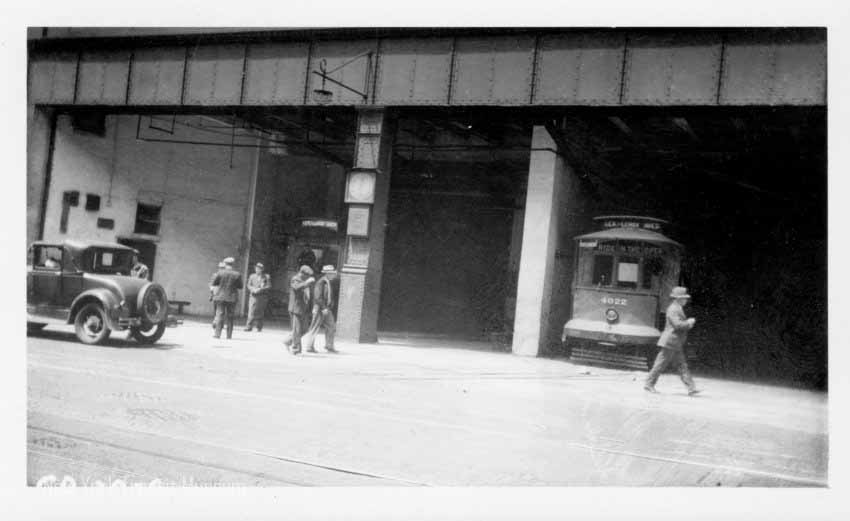
A trolley at the Lenox Avenue Line's carhouse in Harlem, today the site of the MTA's Mother Clare Hale Bus Depot.

The Lenox Avenue Line is a surface transit line on Lenox Avenue in Harlem, Manhattan, New York City, United States. The line was once operated separately, but later became the northern end of the Broadway and Columbus Avenue Line and Broadway and Lexington Avenue Line, now the M7 and M102 bus routes.

== History ==
The franchise given to the Sixth Avenue Railroad by the city in 1851 specified that it should extend its tracks "up the Sixth avenue to Harlem River, whenever required by the Common Council". Because Central Park was designated in 1853, the Sixth Avenue Line was only built to 59th Street. This long-dormant clause was used in 1894, when the Common Council ordered the company, then leased to the Metropolitan Street Railway, to build in what had become Lenox Avenue from 110th Street (the northern boundary of Central Park) to the Harlem River. The Metropolitan used the line to experiment with conduit electrification, opening on July 9, 1895. From opening, the main line began at Columbus Avenue and 108th Street, where the cable-powered Columbus Avenue Line ended, and ran along Columbus Avenue, 109th Street, Manhattan Avenue, 116th Street, and Lenox Avenue to the river (148th Street). Franchises for the tracks other than on Lenox Avenue had been granted to the Lexington Avenue and Pavonia Ferry Railroad in 1892 and the Columbus and Ninth Avenue Railroad in 1894. The Metropolitan soon decided that it would convert all of its lines to the conduit system, being less costly than cable traction. The Lenox Avenue Car House, a car house and power house, occupied the block bounded by Lenox Avenue, Seventh Avenue, and 146th and 147th Streets.

The car house was rebuilt as a bus garage by the New York City Omnibus Corporation in 1938 and 1939, and is still used by the New York City Transit Authority as the Mother Clara Hale Depot.

By 1935, its last full year of operation, the line, operated by New York Railways, was known as the Lexington-Lenox Avenue Line. It ran from 22nd Street and Broadway to 146th Street and Lenox Avenue, via 23rd Street, Lexington Avenue, 116th Street, and Lenox Avenue.
