= Bleecker Street Line =

Public transit line in New York City, U.S.

The Bleecker Street Line was a public transit line in Manhattan, New York City, United States, running mostly along Bleecker Street, Crosby Street, and Lafayette Street from the West 14th Street Ferry in Chelsea to the Fulton Ferry in the Financial District. It was the last horse car line in New York City, and was not replaced with a trolley line or bus route when it was abandoned in 1917.

== History ==
The Bleecker Street and Fulton Ferry Railroad was chartered December 12, 1864 and began operations in April 1865. Eastbound cars ran along 14th Street, Hudson Street, Bleecker Street, Crosby Street, Howard Street, Lafayette Street, Reade Street, Centre Street, Park Row, and Beekman Street. Westbound cars returned from the ferry on Fulton Street, Gold Street, and Ann Street to Park Row, and also used MacDougal Street, 8th Street, Greenwich Avenue, and 12th Street rather than part of Bleecker Street. The Twenty-Third Street Railway leased the company on January 10, 1876, and was subleased to the Houston, West Street and Pavonia Ferry Railroad on April 25, 1893 and to the Metropolitan Street Railway on November 29, 1893.

By 1907, the line had been abandoned east of the crossing of Broadway, and only ran west to 14th Street; the trackage on 14th Street was used by the 14th Street-Williamsburg Bridge Line. Service was terminated on July 26, 1917.
