= Second Avenue Railroad =

The Second Avenue Railroad was a street railway company in Manhattan, New York City, United States. Its lines included the Second Avenue Line. The line ran from Peck Slip in Lower Manhattan to the Harlem River. It included branches to the 92nd Street Ferry along the 86th Street Crosstown Line and through 59th Street and First Avenue at the First Avenue Line. Between 1898 and 1908, it was leased by the Metropolitan Street Railway.

The East Side Omnibus Corporation replaced the Second Avenue Line with the M15 bus route and the First Avenue Line with the M13 bus route on First Avenue on June 26, 1933. The routes were combined into a one-way pair on June 4, 1951 and kept the number M15. Limited stop service began on February 11, 1974.

As of 2010, the Second Avenue Railroad is part of the M15 Select Bus Service line.
