= M11 (New York City bus) =

Bus route in Manhattan, New York

m11
- Ninth and Tenth Avenues Line
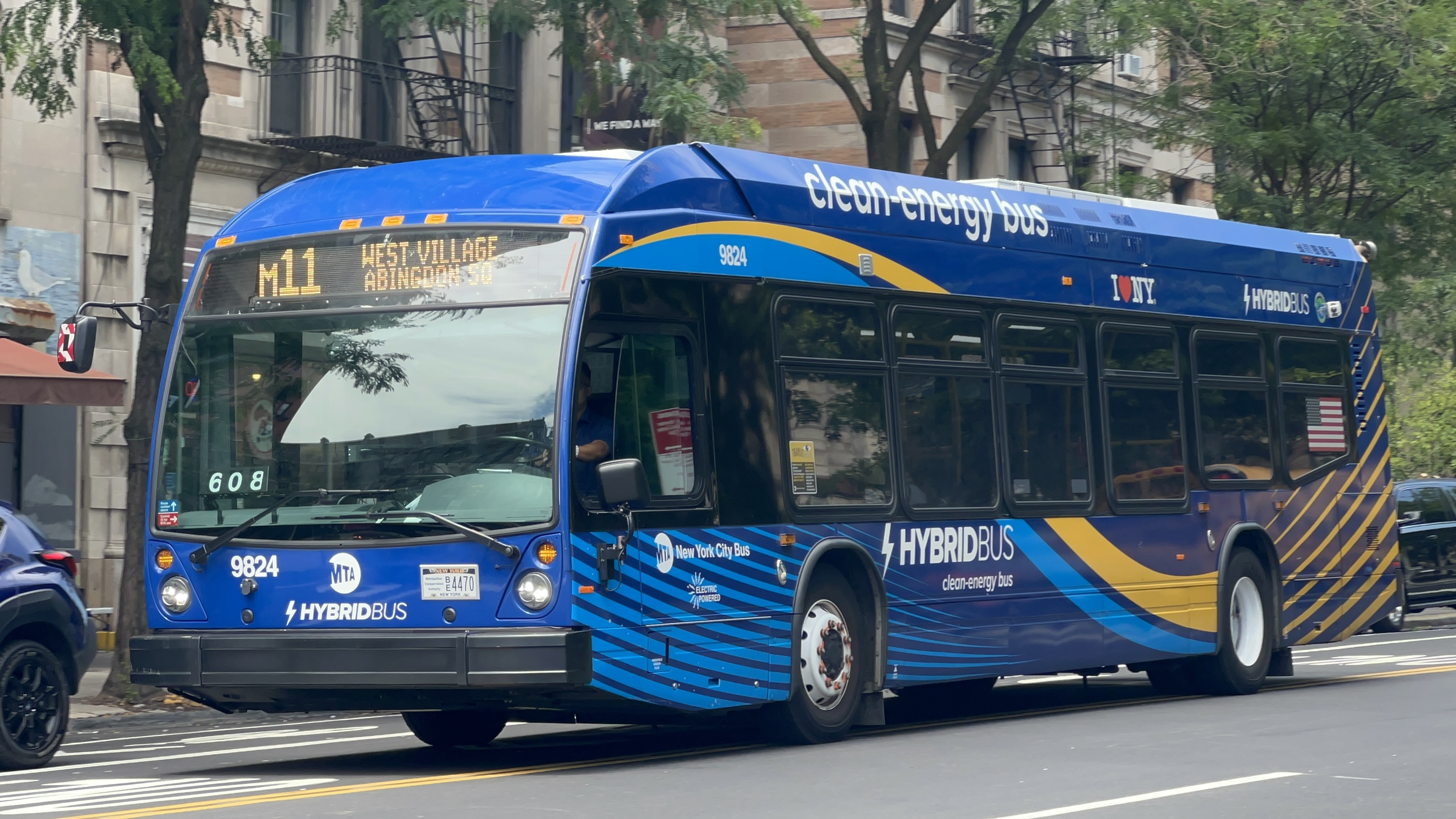
- A 2021 Nova Bus LFS HEV (9824) on the West Village-bound M11 in 2024

Overview
- System: MTA Regional Bus Operations
- Operator: Manhattan and Bronx Surface Transit Operating Authority
- Garage: Manhattanville Depot; Michael J. Quill Depot (school trippers)
- Vehicle: Orion VII NG HEV; Nova Bus LFS HEV; New Flyer Xcelsior XDE40; New Flyer Xcelsior XD40 (school tripper only); New Flyer Xcelsior XE40 (school tripper only)
- Began service: 1859 (train); 1935 (bus); 1948 (current alignment)

Route
- Locale: Manhattan, New York, U.S.
- Start: West Village – Abingdon Square
- Via: Tenth (Amsterdam) Avenue (northbound); Ninth (Columbus) Avenue (southbound)
- End: Broadway / 133rd Street or Riverbank State Park – 145th Street
- Length: 7.6 miles (12.2 km) (northbound)
- Other routes: M7 6th/7th/Columbus/ Amsterdam/Lenox Avs

Service
- Operates: 4:50 AM – 1:50 AM
- Annual patronage: 2,957,626 (2025)
- Transfers: Yes
- Timetable: M11

The Ninth and Tenth Avenues Line or Ninth Avenue Line is a surface transit line in the New York City borough of Manhattan, running mostly along Ninth Avenue and Amsterdam Avenue from Lower Manhattan to Manhattanville. Originally a streetcar line operated by the Manhattan and Bronx Surface Transit Operating Authority, it is now the M11 bus route operated by the New York City Transit Authority under the MaBSTOA subsidiary.

== Current route ==
The M11 bus route begins at Bethune Street (Abingdon Square) in Greenwich Village, and starts out by heading northbound on Greenwich Street and southbound on Hudson Street. Where the route crosses 14th Street, Hudson Street becomes Ninth Avenue, while the northbound direction jogs west on 14th Street to reach Tenth Avenue. This one-way pair on Ninth and Tenth Avenues, which become Columbus Avenue and Amsterdam Avenue north of 59th Street, continues until 110th Street, where the southbound route joins the northbound direction on Amsterdam Avenue. Several turns - west on 135th Street, north on Riverside Drive, and west on 145th Street - take the M11 to its end at Riverbank State Park. Passengers can transfer to the subway at 137th Street–City College.

When Riverbank State Park is closed, the M11 terminates at 133rd Street and Broadway, turning left on 133rd Street from Amsterdam Avenue, making a left on Old Broadway, and a right onto 131st Street and Broadway, ending at 133rd Street before the intersection. The southbound M11 runs up Broadway until 135th Street, making a right turn there and resuming the regular route.

=== School trippers ===
When school is in session, one trip departs M.S. 297 at Hudson/Barrow Streets at 3:10pm and heads north to its regular route via Hudson, Christopher, and Greenwich Streets. This trip terminates at 67th Street. Between 3:05 and 3:14pm, four other trips originate at Booker T. Washington High School at 108th Street and head south. Most terminate at 23rd Street, while the second trip terminates at 42nd Street. All school trippers operate out of the Michael J. Quill Depot.

== History ==
The Ninth Avenue Railroad was given a franchise in December 1853 to build from the Battery north to 51st Street and beyond to the Harlem River via Greenwich Street, Ninth Avenue, Broadway, and Amsterdam Avenue, and to return via Gansevoort Street and Washington Street instead of Greenwich Street. By 1854, the company had laid tracks from Canal Street north to 54th Street, but, due to legal complications on the route south of Canal Street, it could not complete and open the line. The city passed a resolution on July 2, 1859, allowing the company to connect to the Hudson River Railroad's tracks in Canal Street, and run over any part of the lines of the Hudson River Railroad, Sixth Avenue Railroad, and Eighth Avenue Railroad in and below Canal Street. The line opened in late July 1859, using the shared trackage of the Sixth and Eighth Avenue Railroads from Broadway and Barclay Street along Barclay Street, Church Street (northbound only), Chambers Street (northbound only), and West Broadway to Canal Street.

The line was later extended south along Washington and Greenwich Streets and east on Fulton Street to Broadway, and north from 54th Street to 59th Street. The beginning of a lengthy extension to the north opened on March 9, 1884, along Ninth Avenue, Columbus Avenue, Broadway, and Amsterdam Avenue from 59th Street to 74th Street. It was extended further to 110th Street on April 26, 1884, later to LaSalle Street, and finally to the Fort Lee Ferry via LaSalle Street, Broadway, and 130th Street.

The Houston, West Street and Pavonia Ferry Railroad leased the Ninth Avenue Railroad on March 12, 1892, and on December 12, 1893 the HWS&PF was merged into the Metropolitan Street Railway. Under the Metropolitan, the south end was changed to the Christopher Street Ferry, using the trackage of the Christopher and Tenth Street Railroad on Christopher Street. The Metropolitan also introduced the Ninth and Columbus Avenues Line, a combination of the Ninth Avenue Line (from the Cortlandt Street Ferry) with the Columbus Avenue Line, a former cable railway line, as well as the Sixth and Amsterdam Avenues Line, an extension of the Sixth Avenue Line west on 59th Street and north along the Ninth and Amsterdam Avenues Line. The Sixth Avenue cars, but not those from Ninth Avenue, were extended north on Amsterdam Avenue to Fort George, along the Third Avenue Railroad's Third and Amsterdam Avenues Line, after the Metropolitan leased the Third Avenue in 1900.

In 1908, the Third Avenue was released from the bankrupt Metropolitan. The Metropolitan introduced the Broadway and Amsterdam Avenue Line on February 17, 1908, connecting the Broadway Line to the Ninth and Amsterdam Avenues Line via 53rd Street. The Ninth and Columbus Avenues Line was later discontinued, and all Ninth Avenue cars, then beginning at both the Cortlandt Street and Christopher Street Ferries, were truncated to the intersection with 53rd Street, where passengers could transfer to the Broadway and Amsterdam Avenue Line, Sixth and Amsterdam Avenues Line, and Broadway and Columbus Avenue Line.

In 1919, the Ninth Avenue Railroad was separated from the bankrupt New York Railways, which had replaced the Metropolitan, and the Ninth Avenue and Amsterdam Avenue tracks were again linked by a single line, only shared with New York Railways cars (of the Broadway and Columbus Avenue Line) between 53rd Street and Broadway. The Ninth Avenue Railroad merged with the also-separated Eighth Avenue Railroad in December 1926 to form the Eighth and Ninth Avenues Railway.

=== Bus service ===
Buses were substituted for streetcars by the Eighth Avenue Coach Corporation, a New York Railways subsidiary, on November 12, 1935, and assigned the number M42. It was subsequently labeled 11 by the New York City Omnibus Corporation when it gained control in 1936.

When Ninth and Tenth Avenues became one-way streets on November 6, 1948, traffic was split between 14th Street and 110th Street, with southbound traffic moving to Tenth Avenue south of Broadway, and northbound traffic moving to Columbus Avenue north of Broadway. The New York City Omnibus Corporation directly took over operations in 1951, and in 1956 it was renamed Fifth Avenue Coach Lines; the Manhattan and Bronx Surface Transit Operating Authority, now a wholly owned subsidiary of the MTA's New York City Transit Authority, replaced it in 1962.

In its first 30 years in bus service, the 11's northern terminus was at La Salle Street and Broadway. On June 20, 1965, it was extended to 132nd Street and Broadway. On May 9, 1977, service was extended along Amsterdam Avenue to 135th Street. On June 26, 1994, the route was extended along 135th Street and Riverside Drive to Riverbank State Park during park hours–7 a.m. to 11 p.m. During other times, the route terminated at its previous terminal at 132nd Street and Broadway. This extension added service along Riverside Drive between West 135th Street and West 145th Street, and provided access to the park from the south. The M11's previous terminal required a U-turn on Broadway, and the extension removed the safety hazard. After six-months, ridership on the extension was lower than expected, and the route extension was to be reevaluated after summer 1995.

On January 9, 2005, M11 and M14 service was rerouted to run via 14th Street instead of 15th Street between Ninth Avenue and Tenth Avenue to avoid congestion.
