= Grand Street Ferry =

Former ferry in Manhattan and Brooklyn, New York

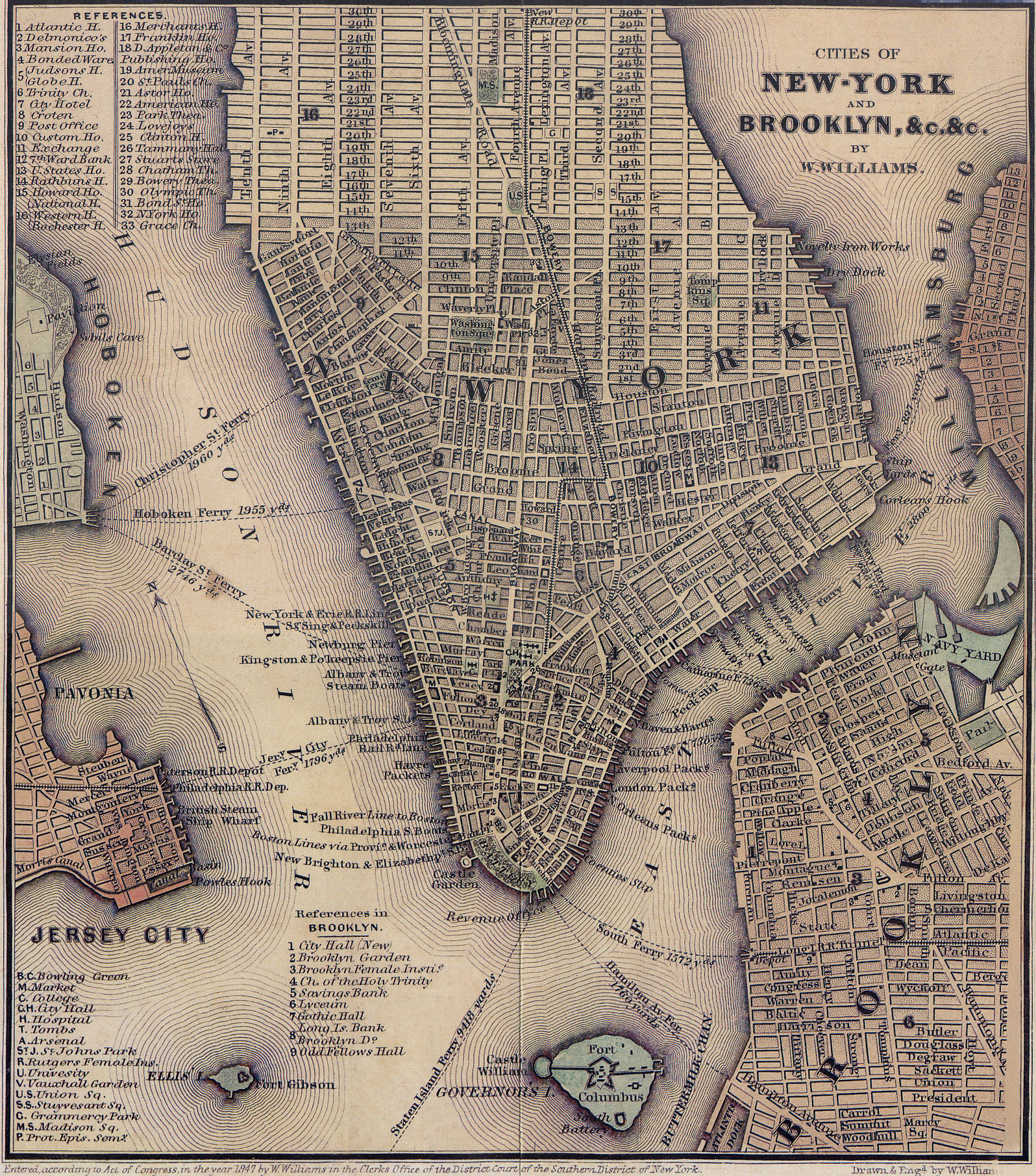
Map from 1847 showing the route of the Grand Street Ferry

The Grand Street Ferry was a ferry route connecting Manhattan and Williamsburg, Brooklyn, New York City, joining Grand Street (Manhattan) and Grand Street (Brooklyn) across the East River.

== History ==
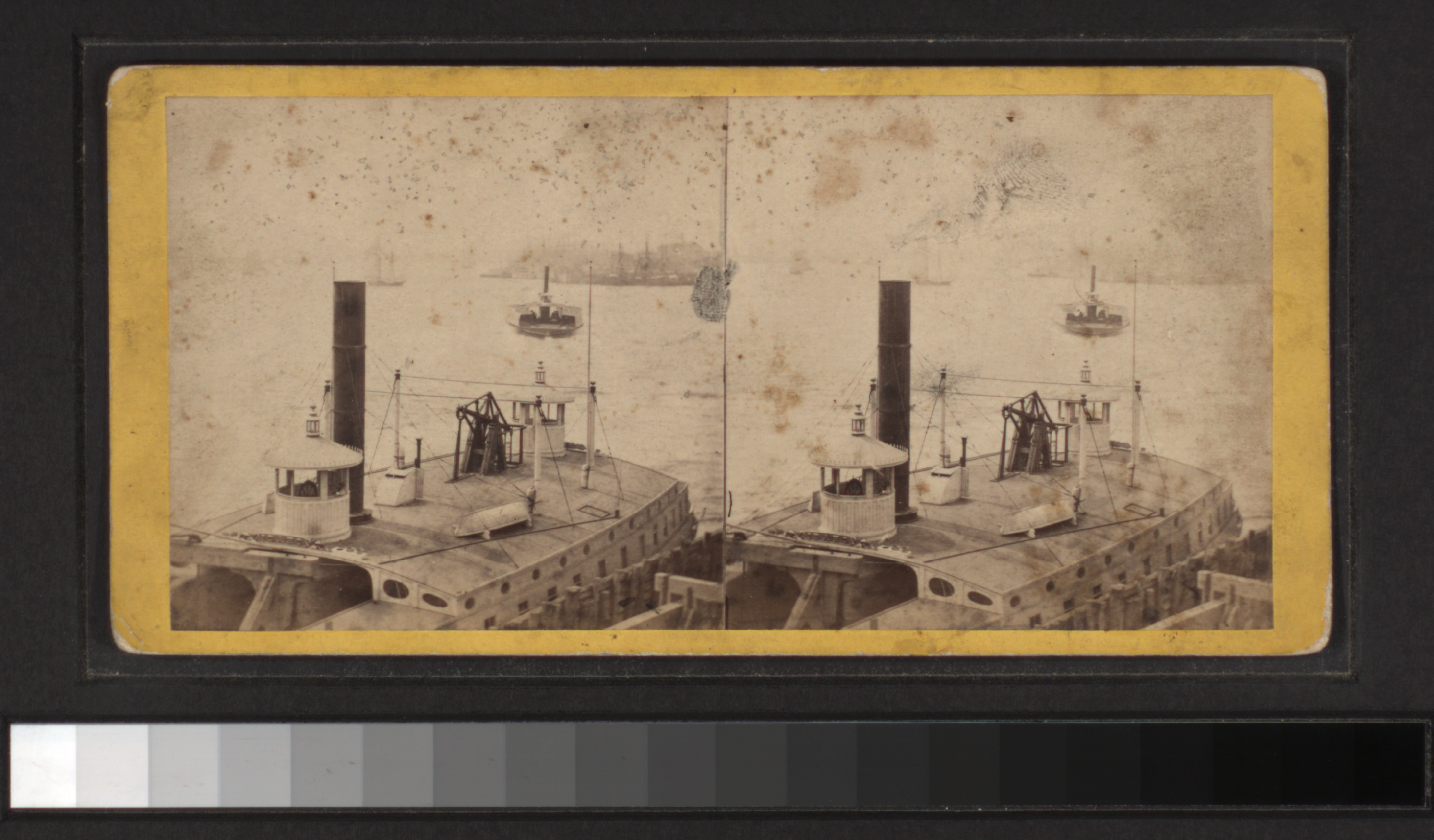
The East River as seen from the Grand Street Ferry

The first ferry connecting Manhattan to Williamsburg was established in the early 19th century, connecting to North Second Street in Williamsburg. The Grand Street Ferry began operations in 1812, and took over and stopped the former a few years later.

== See also ==
- Forty-second Street and Grand Street Ferry Railroad which ran in the second half of the 19th century along 42nd Street from Tenth Avenue to Grand Street Ferry.
