= Seventh Avenue Line (Manhattan surface) =

The Seventh Avenue Line is a surface public transit line in Manhattan, New York City, United States, connecting Lower Manhattan with Central Park along Seventh Avenue. Once a streetcar line, it is now part of the southbound direction of the M10 and M20 bus routes.

== History ==
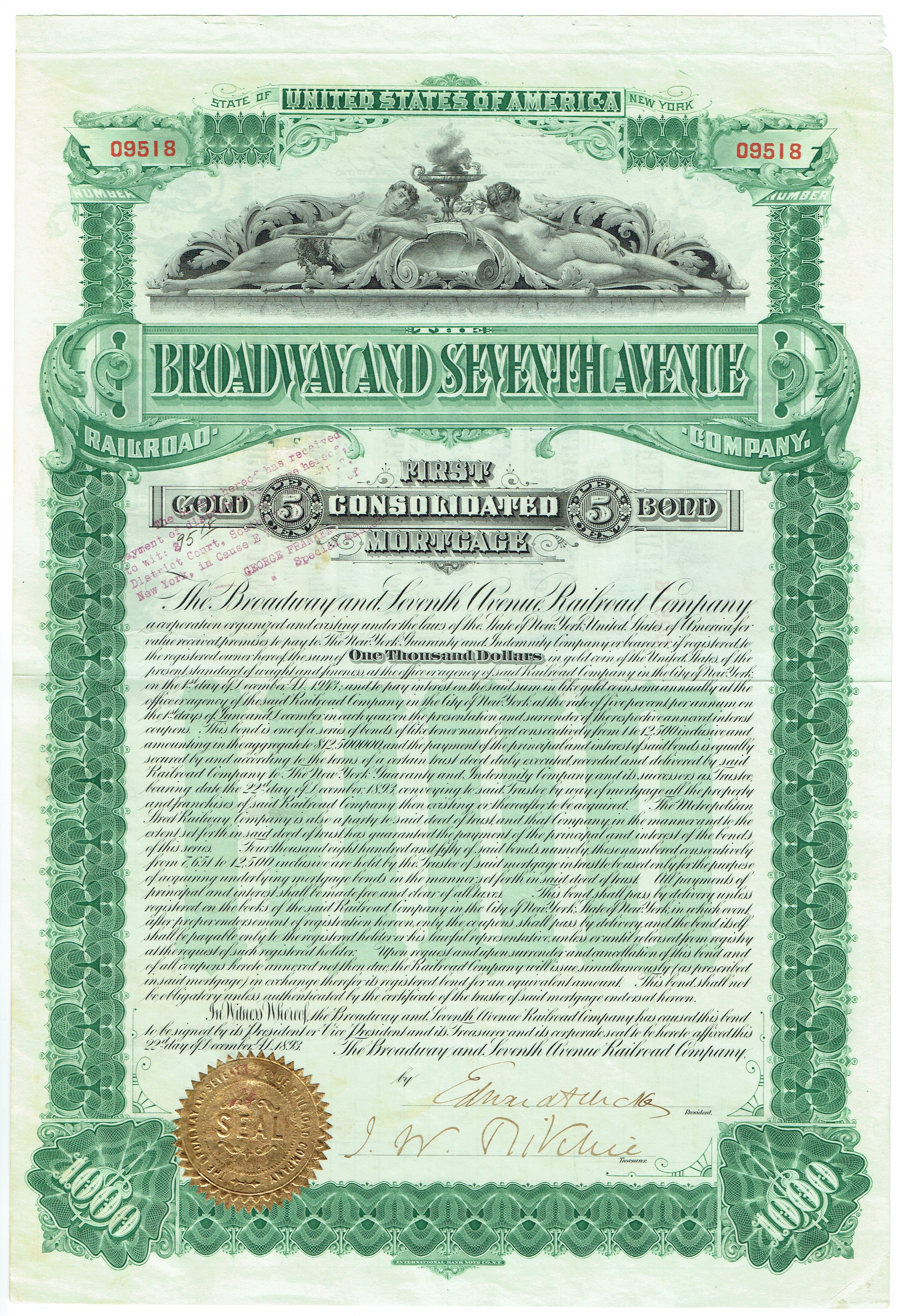
Goldbond of the Broadway and Seventh Avenue Railroad Company, issued 22 December 1893

The Broadway and Seventh Avenue Railroad was chartered by the New York State Legislature in April 1860; the authorized system consisted of two main lines - the Seventh Avenue Line and Broadway Line - connecting Broadway near City Hall with Central Park. The Seventh Avenue Line began at Seventh Avenue and 59th Street and proceeded in a general southerly direction through Seventh Avenue, Greenwich Avenue, Eighth Street, MacDougal Street, Fourth Street, Thompson Street, Canal Street, and West Broadway, with a one-way pair of single tracks in West Broadway and Barclay Street in one direction and Chambers Street and Church Street in the other, and ending in a double track on the block of Barclay Street between Church Street and Broadway. Branches along three other streets - Broome Street, Duane Street, and Park Place - to Broadway were also authorized, and the Broadway Line shared the route north of Times Square and south of Barclay Street (in one direction on Church Street) and Canal Street (in the other direction on West Broadway).

The company was incorporated on May 26, 1864, and opened the Seventh Avenue Line by the end of 1865.

An 1866 law required the company to replace its double track in Fourth and Thompson Streets with a one-way pair, the other direction using Third and Sullivan Streets between MacDougal and Canal Streets. Since the block of MacDougal Street between Third and Fourth Streets was already used northbound by the Bleecker Street and Fulton Ferry Railroad's Bleecker Street Line, and the Seventh Avenue cars used that track via trackage rights, a law was passed in 1867 requiring the Seventh Avenue cars to travel in the same direction, with northbound cars in Sullivan Street, a block west of southbound cars in Thompson Street.
