= M9 (New York City bus) =

Bus route in Manhattan, New York

m9
- Avenue C Line
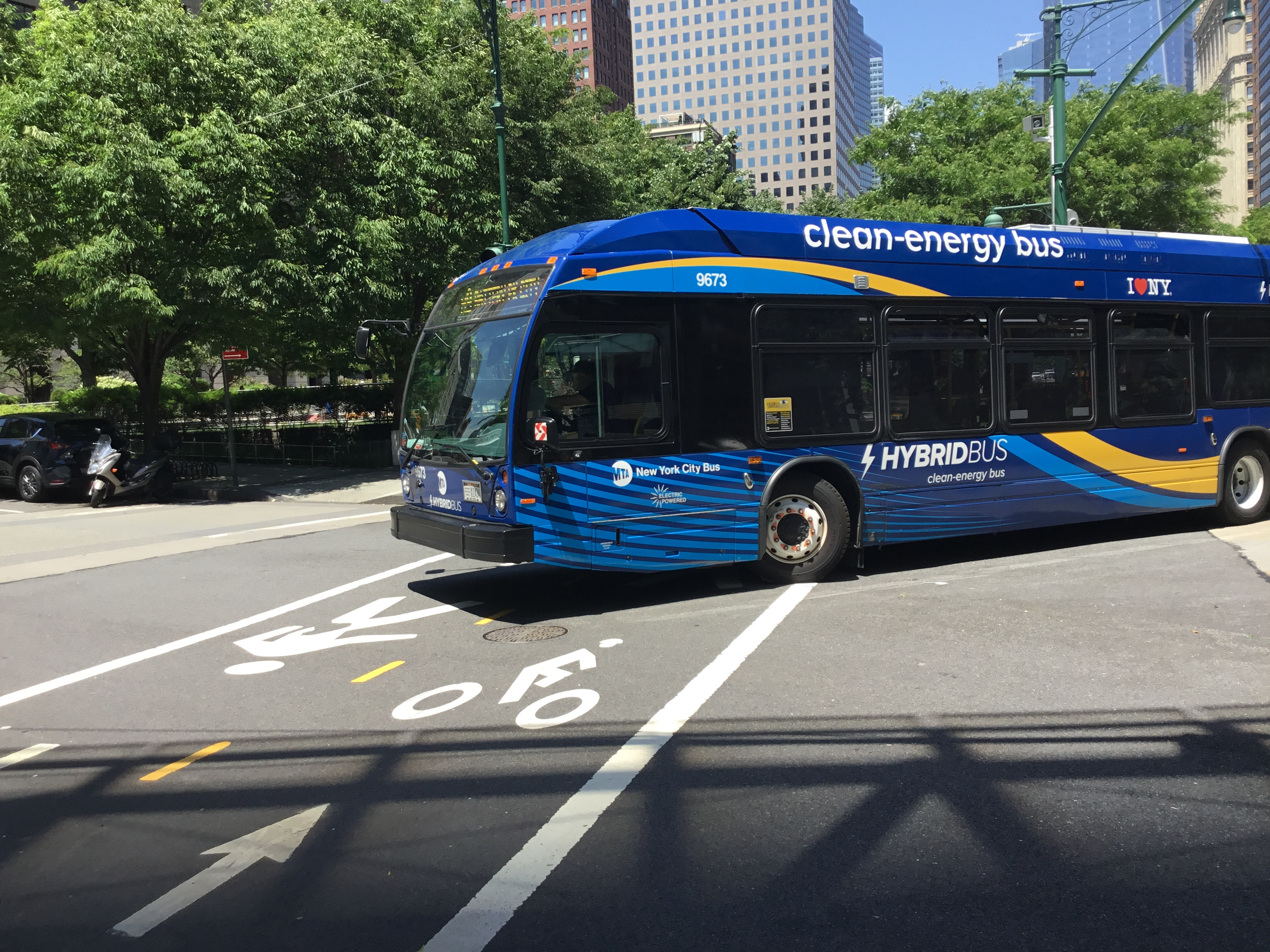
- A 2021 Nova Bus LFS HEV (9673) on the Battery Park City-bound M9

Overview
- System: MTA Regional Bus Operations
- Operator: Manhattan and Bronx Surface Transit Operating Authority
- Garage: Michael J. Quill Depot
- Vehicle: New Flyer Xcelsior XD40; New Flyer Xcelsior XE40; Nova Bus LFS HEV
- Began service: 1869 (train); 1893 (streetcar); 1919 (bus); 2013 (current alignment)

Route
- Locale: Manhattan, New York, U.S.
- Start: Bellevue Hospital – 26th Street
- Via: Avenue C East Broadway
- End: Battery Park City – Liberty Street
- Length: 5.4 miles (8.7 km) (southbound)

Service
- Operates: 6:00 AM – 10:45 PM
- Annual patronage: 1,267,542 (2025)
- Transfers: Yes
- Timetable: M9

The M9 is a local bus route that operates along the Avenue C Line (also known as the Houston Street Line), in Manhattan, New York City. The M9 and M21 are operated by MTA Regional Bus Operations under the MaBSTOA division and based out of the Michael J. Quill Depot.

== Current route ==
The route runs mostly along Essex Street and Avenue C from Battery Park City to Kips Bay. The M9 stays on Houston Street until Avenue C and Peter Cooper Village. Eastbound buses continue to 20th and 23rd Streets and use 1st Avenue to access 25th Street, where they terminate. Westbound buses then use 29th Street, 23rd Street, and Avenue C to access Houston St, where they head back to the West Side.

== History ==
=== Early history ===
The Avenue C Railroad (changed to the Houston, West Street and Pavonia Ferry Railroad in the early 1880s) was chartered June 3, 1874, and opened the Avenue C Line on October 18, 1869, connecting the Pavonia Ferry at the foot of Chambers Street with the Green Point Ferry at the foot of East 10th Street. Its route ran along West Street, a one-way pair of Charlton Street, Prince Street, and Stanton Street (eastbound) and Houston Street, 1st Avenue, and 3rd Street (westbound), Pitt Street/Avenue C, and 10th Street. By 1879, the line had been extended north on Avenue C from 10th Street, west on 17th Street (eastbound) and 18th Street (westbound), north over the Central Park, North and East River Railroad (First Avenue and East Belt Line) on Avenue A, 23rd Street, and 1st Avenue, west on 35th Street (westbound) and 36th Street (eastbound), north on Lexington Avenue, and west on 42nd Street to Grand Central Terminal. The Third Avenue Railroad also used the trackage on 42nd Street by 1884.

On November 29, 1893, the Houston, West Street and Pavonia Ferry Railroad was merged into the Metropolitan Street Railway. The line was cut back to Avenue A at 24th Street by 1907; the trackage on 35th and 36th Streets was removed, while the other trackage became parts of the Lexington Avenue Line and 42nd Street Crosstown Line.

Buses were substituted for streetcars in September 1919. Service was suspended, but brought back in March 1929 by the Hamilton Bus Company. The Triangle Bus Corporation took over in 1935, and the New York City Omnibus Corporation acquired the route in 1940. That company changed its name to Fifth Avenue Coach Lines in 1956; the Manhattan and Bronx Surface Transit Operating Authority took over operations in 1962.

=== Recent history ===
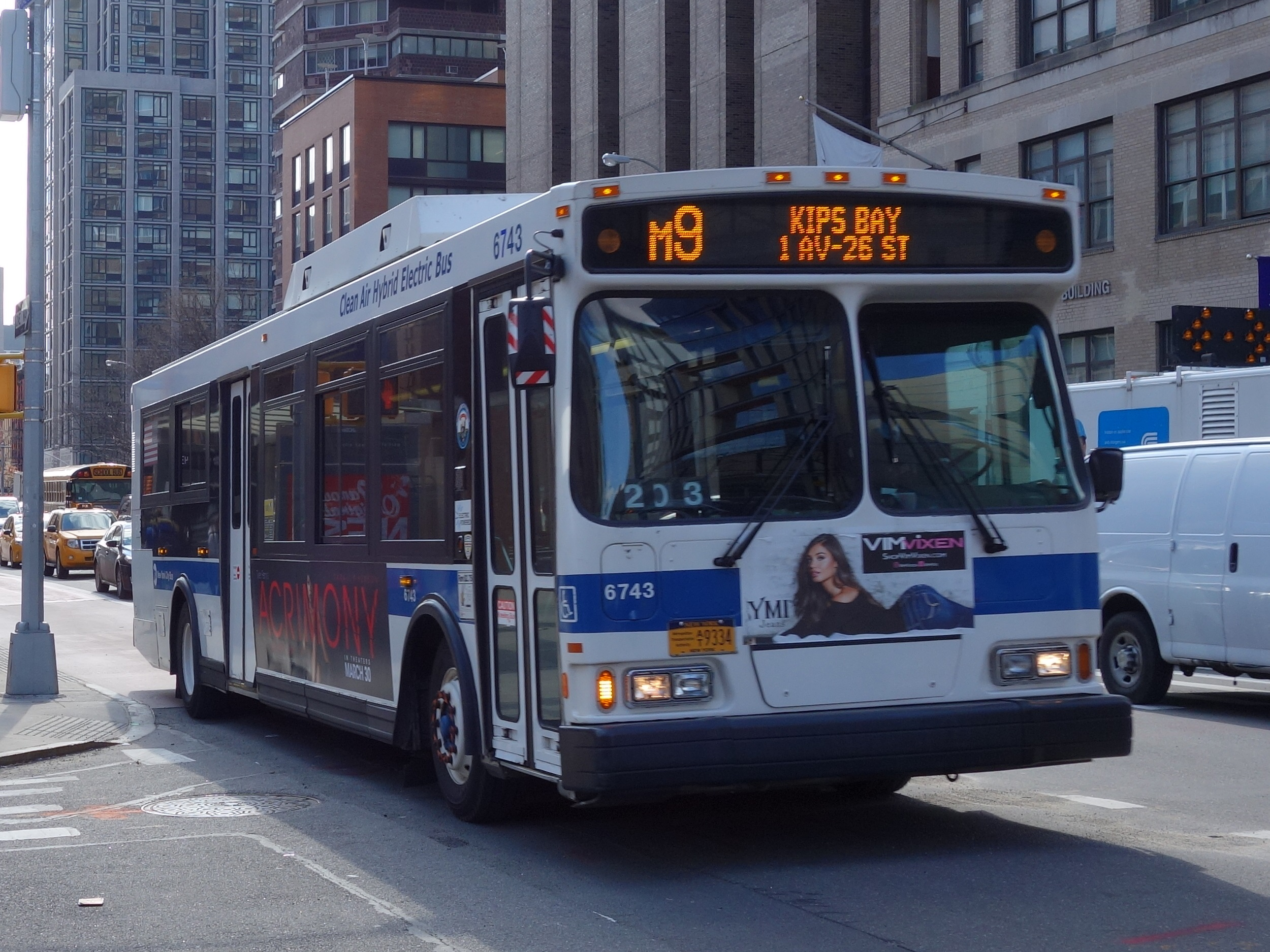
A 2006 Orion VII OG HEV (6743) on the Kips Bay-bound M9 at 1st Ave/25th St

Originally a streetcar line, the Avenue C Line is now part of the M9 route, as well as the M21, which operates on the Houston Street Line. Both the Avenue C and Houston Street segments were served by a single route, the M21, until June 2010.

In 2010, the M9, which ran to 14th Street-Union Square via Avenue B and north of Houston St, was rerouted to Avenue C up to 23rd Street only due to a budget crisis and was rerouted back to Park Row to replace the M15 to City Hall. On January 6, 2013, the M9 was extended north to 29th Street via First Avenue from 23rd Street and south to Battery Park City from City Hall.
