= Sixth Avenue Line (Manhattan surface) =

Former bus route in Manhattan, New York

The Sixth Avenue Line was a public transit line in Manhattan, New York City, running mostly along Sixth Avenue from Lower Manhattan to Central Park. Originally a streetcar line and later a bus route, it has been absorbed into the M5 bus route, which replaced the Broadway Line, as its northbound direction.

== Route description ==
The Sixth Avenue Line begins at the South Ferry, and runs north along State Street and then west on Battery Place. It then turns right onto Greenwich Street. Greenwich Street changes names to Trinity Place, and then Church Street. It then bears left onto Sixth Avenue, also known as Avenue of the Americas. It follows Sixth Avenue until its end at Central Park South (West 59th Street).

The Fifth and Sixth Avenues Line (M5/M55) follows the same route as the former Sixth Avenue Line.

== History ==
The Sixth Avenue Railroad opened the line from Chambers Street and West Broadway north along West Broadway, Canal Street, Varick Street, Carmine Street, and Sixth Avenue to 43rd Street (soon 44th Street) on August 11, 1852; the Eighth Avenue Railroad began using the trackage along and south of Canal Street on August 30. In 1853, it was extended south along West Broadway to the new depot at Barclay Street, and a branch was added on Canal Street east to Broadway. On October 7, 1853, trackage was added on Church Street, Chambers Street, and Barclay Street to form a loop. The grant given to the Sixth and Eighth Avenue Railroads specified that they would run to Broadway and Vesey Street; this extension, in Church and Vesey Streets, was opened by 1865.

Extensions to the north opened to 49th Street in March 1856 and to 59th Street by 1865. Cars were later extended west on 59th Street and north on Columbus Avenue, Broadway, and Amsterdam Avenue into Upper Manhattan, and a branch (the Sixth Avenue Ferry Line) was added via the Metropolitan Crosstown Line, along Watts Street and West Street to the Desbrosses Street Ferry.

By 1935, the last full year of operation, the Sixth Avenue line, now run by the New York Railways Company, ran from 4th Street to 59th Street. The fare, as for all street car lines at the time, was 5 cents, with transfers costing an additional 2 cents.

Buses were substituted for streetcars by the New York City Omnibus Corporation (which numbered it 5) on March 3, 1936. When Sixth Avenue between 34th and 59th Streets, Broadway between 34th Street and Columbus Circle, and Seventh Avenue between Times Square and 59th Street became one-way streets on March 10, 1957, the 5's southbound route from 59th to 34th Street was rerouted to Seventh Avenue and then Broadway before rejoining Sixth Avenue. After another set of one-way conversions on June 3, 1962, the southbound 5 in lower Manhattan was rerouted to West Broadway between Lispenard and Vesey Streets. After the rest of Sixth Avenue below 34th Street, and Broadway between 34th and 23rd Streets and between 14th and Canal Streets, were converted to one-way streets on November 10, 1963, the 5 was discontinued and absorbed into the NYCO's bus 6 (which replaced the Broadway Line), which was rerouted largely over the former Sixth Avenue Line northbound.
