= Metropolitan Crosstown Line =

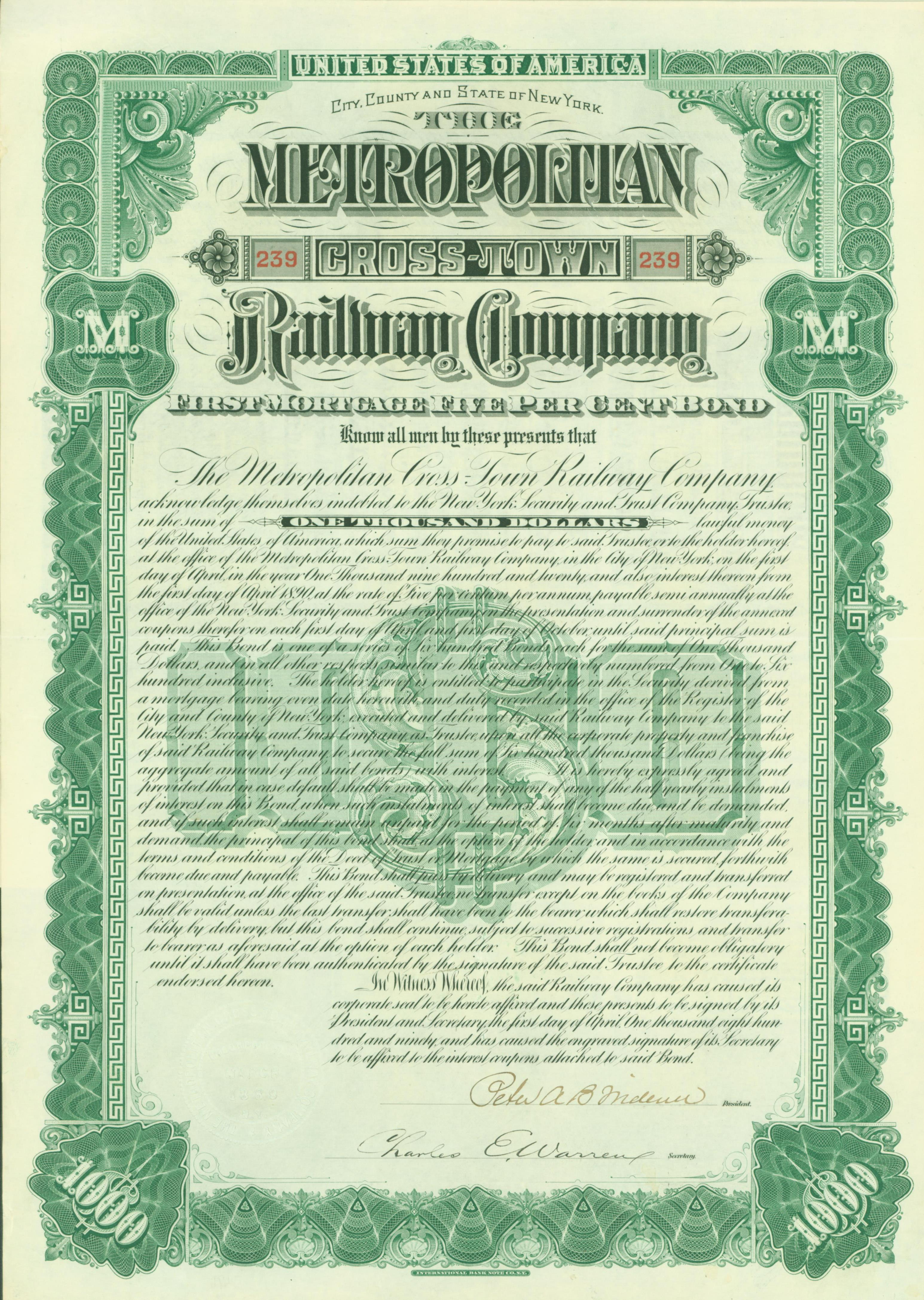
Bond of the Metropolitan Cross-Town Railway Company, issued 1. April 1890

The Metropolitan Crosstown Line was a surface public transit line in Manhattan, New York City, United States, connecting the 14th Street Ferry and Desbrosses Street Ferry on the Hudson River with the Grand Street Ferry on the East River. It was owned by the New York Railways Company, and contained the Spring and Delancey Streets Line streetcars. The company was discontinued September 21, 1919 but restored from February 1, 1920 to May 20, 1931 by court order.
