= M14 (New York City bus) =

Bus routes in Manhattan, New York

m14a, m14d
- 14th Street Crosstown
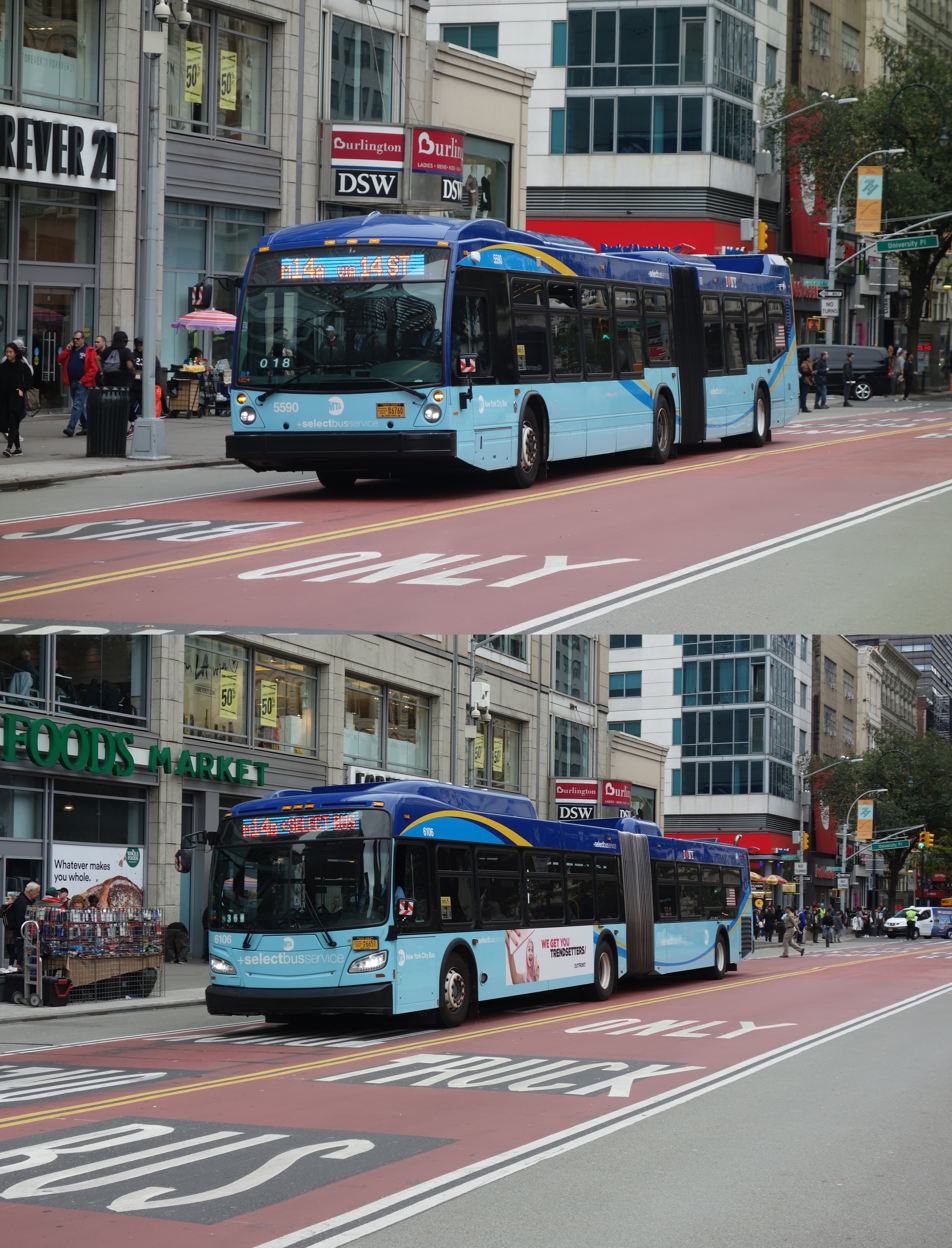
- A 2019 Nova Bus LFS Articulated (5590) on the M14A SBS and a 2017 XD60 (6106) on the M14D SBS in 2019

Overview
- System: MTA Regional Bus Operations
- Operator: Manhattan and Bronx Surface Transit Operating Authority
- Garage: Michael J. Quill Depot
- Vehicle: Nova Bus LFS articulated New Flyer Xcelsior XD60; New Flyer Xcelsior XE60 (main vehicles); New Flyer Xcelsior XD40; New Flyer Xcelsior XE40; Nova Bus LFS HEV (supplemental service)
- Livery: Select Bus Service
- Began service: 1899 (streetcar); 1936 (bus); 2019 (SBS)

Route
- Locale: Manhattan, New York, U.S.
- Start: M14A-SBS: West Side – Abingdon Square; M14D-SBS: Chelsea Piers – 11th Avenue
- Via: 14th Street, Avenue A, Avenue D
- End: M14A-SBS: Lower East Side – Grand Street; M14D-SBS: Lower East Side – Delancey Street
- Length: M14A-SBS EB: 3.3 miles (5.3 km); M14D-SBS EB: 3.6 miles (5.8 km)

Service
- Operates: 24 hours
- Annual patronage: 5,217,529 (2025)
- Transfers: Yes
- Timetable: M14A/D SBS

The 14th Street Crosstown Line is a public transit line in Manhattan, New York City, running primarily along 14th Street from Chelsea or the West Village to the Lower East Side. Originally a streetcar line, it is now the M14 bus route, operated by the New York City Transit Authority under the MaBSTOA subsidiary. The line's two variants, the M14A SBS and M14D SBS, use Avenue A and Avenue D respectively from 14th Street south to the Lower East Side. The M14 carries over 28,000 riders per day.

== Route description and service ==
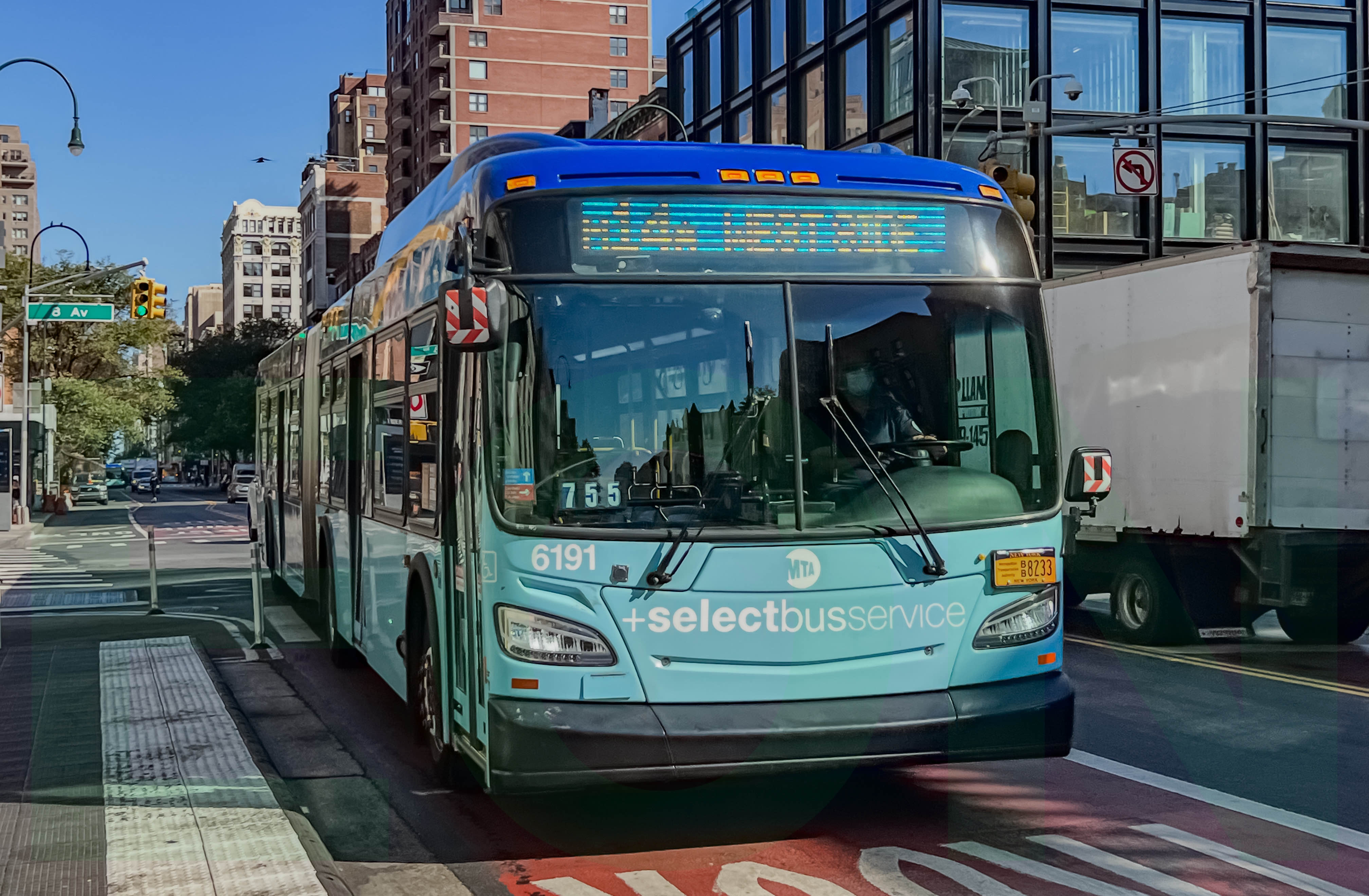
A 2019 XD60 (6191) on the West Side-bound M14A SBS in August 2022.

Both M14 services share the 14th Street Crosstown corridor between 9th Avenue on the West Side and Avenue A on the Lower East Side. The "A" and "D" designations refer to the north–south streets used by each service within the Lower East Side (Avenue A and Avenue D respectively).

West of 9th Avenue, the M14A SBS turns south along Hudson Street, terminating at Bleecker Street at Abingdon Square Park. The M14D SBS meanwhile, travels north from 14th Street and terminate at Chelsea Piers Sports & Entertainment Complex. Until Select Bus Service was implemented, the M14A bus route extended to Chelsea Piers instead of terminating at Abingdon Square Park during overnight hours. This was changed to operate to Abingdon Square at all times.

At the east end of the corridor, the M14A SBS turns south off 14th Street onto Avenue A. It travels all the way down Avenue A (which becomes Essex Street south of Houston Street), turns onto Grand Street, and terminates at Grand Street/FDR Drive on the East River.

The M14D SBS turns south off 14th Street onto Avenue C, East 10th Street, then south along Avenue D (becoming Columbia Street) to Houston Street, turning east onto Houston Street and running along FDR Drive to Delancey Street.

During weekday rush hours, some M14 SBS buses make short turn runs, resulting in some westbound M14 buses terminating at either Union Square or Eighth Avenue, and some eastbound M14 buses terminating at First Avenue. These trips may be signed as just the M14, without any letter suffix.

The M14A/D SBS routes supplement the 14th Street Line (L train), which runs from Eighth Avenue and continues into Brooklyn.

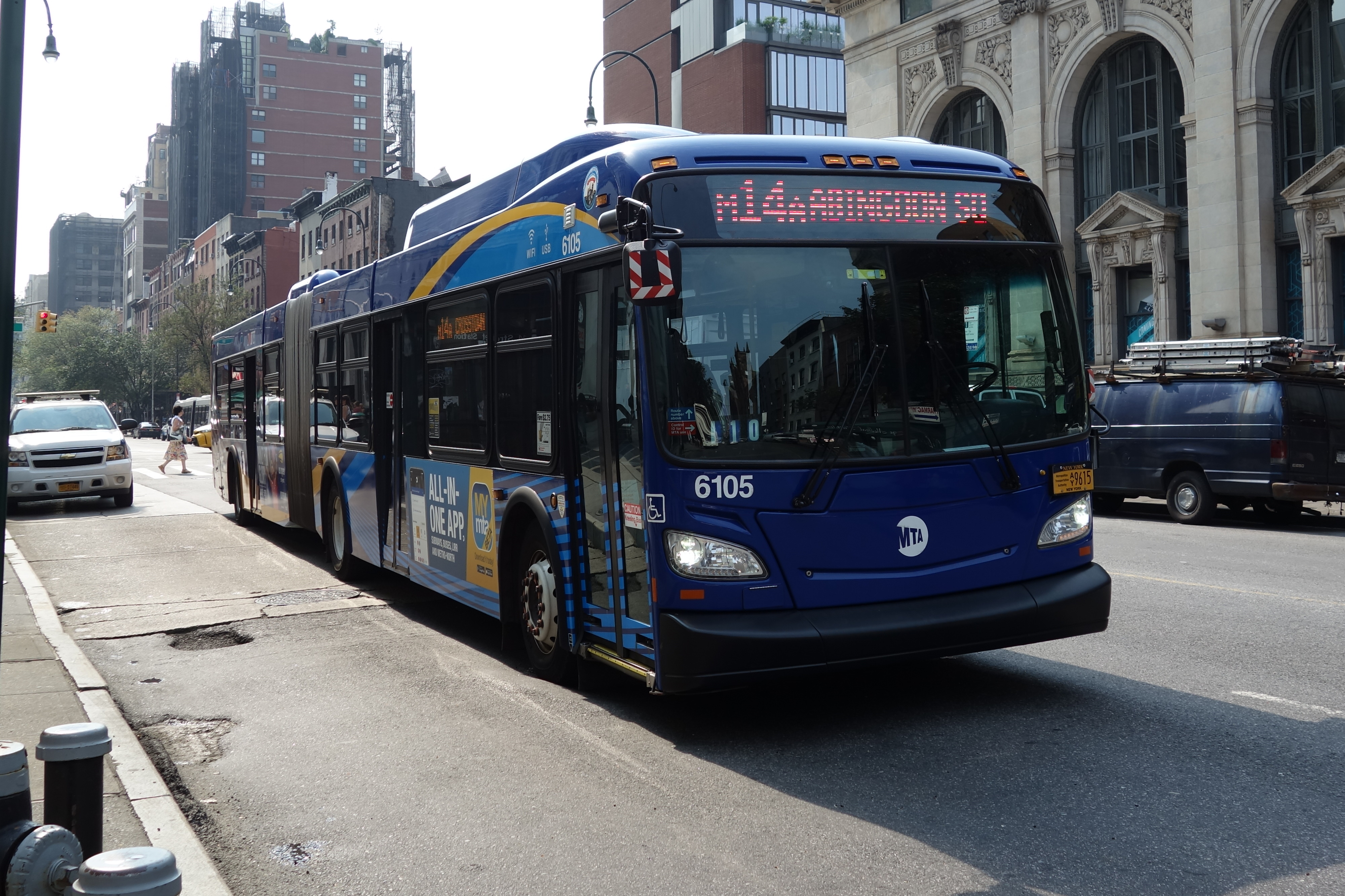
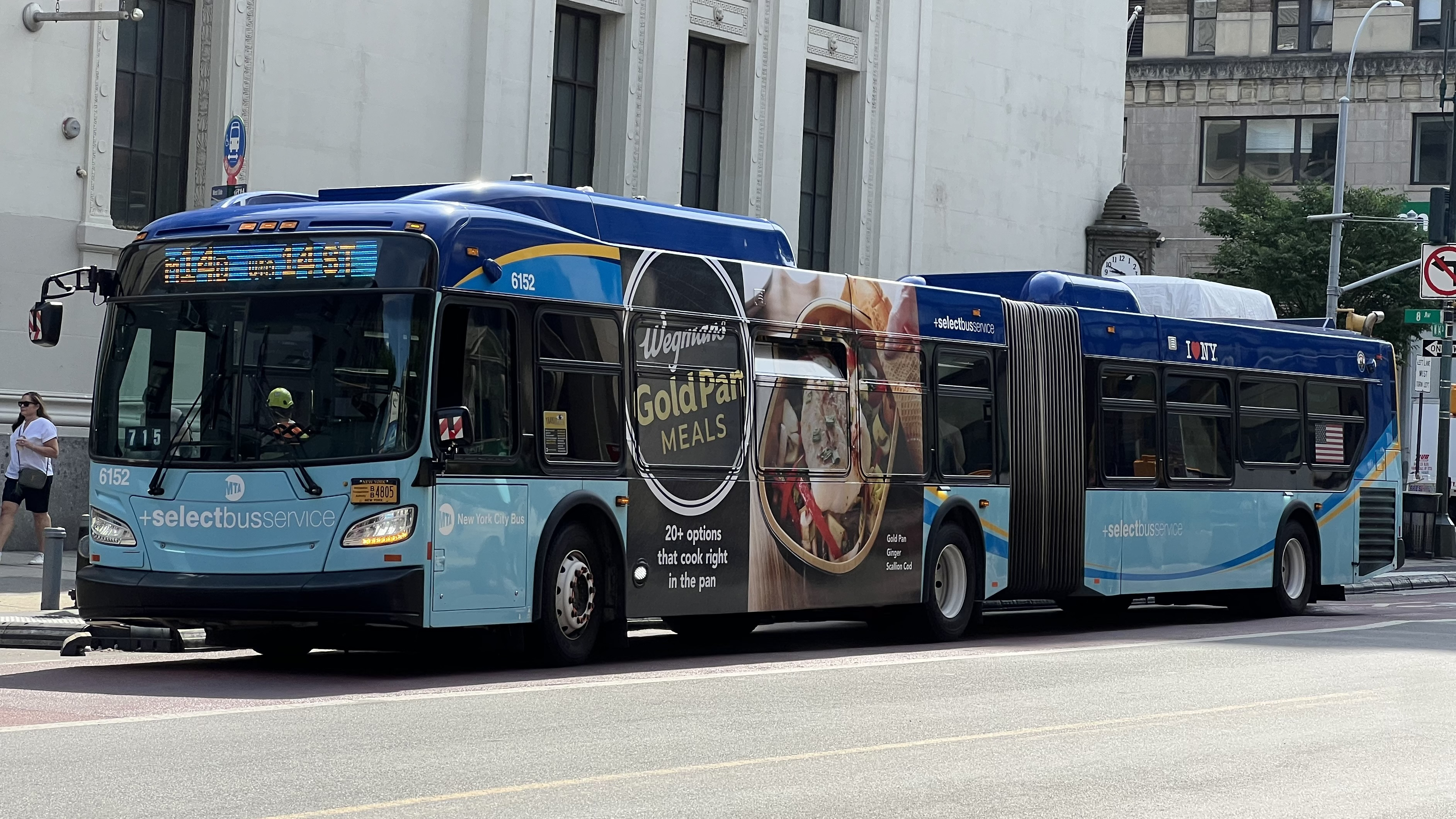
Two XD60s: one local-wrapped 2017 (6105) on the Abingdon Square-bound M14A in August 2018 before implementation (top), and one SBS-wrapped 2019 (6152) on the Chelsea Piers-bound M14D in June 2024 after implementation (bottom), both at West 14th Street/8th Avenue.

=== Stops ===
Station Street traveled	Direction	Connections
M14A only
Bleecker Street Eighth Avenue	Eastbound station	NYC Bus: M20 to Lincoln Center
West 12th Street Hudson Street	Westbound terminus	NYC Bus: M12 to Columbus Circle M11 to Riverbank State Park
West 13th Street Hudson Street	Westbound	NYC Bus: M11, M12 to Abingdon Square
M14D only
Eleventh Avenue West 18th Street	Westbound terminus; eastbound station	NYC Bus: M12 to Columbus Circle
Eleventh Avenue West 15th Street	Westbound	NYC Bus: M12 to Columbus Circle
Tenth Avenue West 14th Street	Westbound	NYC Bus: M12 to Columbus Circle M11 to Riverbank State Park
Ninth Avenue West 14th Street	Westbound	NYC Bus: M12 to Columbus Circle M11 to Riverbank State Park
Tenth Avenue West 18th Street	Eastbound	NYC Bus: M12 to Abingdon Square
West 18th Street Ninth Avenue	Eastbound	NYC Bus: M11, M12 to Abingdon Square
Hudson Street West 14th Street	Eastbound	
M14A and M14D
Eighth Avenue West 14th Street	Bidirectional	NYC Bus: M12 to Columbus Circle, M20 to Lincoln Center; NYC Subway: trains at 14th Street/Eighth Avenue
Seventh Avenue West 14th Street	Bidirectional	NYC Bus: M20 to South Ferry; NYC Subway: trains at 14th Street/Sixth Avenue
Sixth Avenue West 14th Street	Bidirectional	NYC Bus: M7 to Harlem at West 17th Street, M55 to West 44th Street/Sixth Avenue; NYC Subway: trains at 14th Street/Sixth Avenue; PATH: HOB–33, JSQ–33, JSQ–33 (via HOB) trains at 14th Street
Fifth Avenue West 14th Street	Westbound	NYC Bus: M1, M2, M3 to East Village, M55 to South Ferry
Union Square West/University Place East 14th Street	Bidirectional	
Irving Place East 14th Street	Bidirectional	NYC Bus: M1 to Harlem, M2 to Washington Heights, M3 to Fort George; NYC Subway: trains at 14th Street–Union Square
Third Avenue East 14th Street	Bidirectional	NYC Bus: M101, M102, M103; NYC Subway: train at Third Avenue
Second Avenue East 14th Street	Bidirectional	NYC Bus: M15 Local to South Ferry, M15 SBS to South Ferry
First Avenue East 14th Street	Bidirectional	NYC Bus: M15 Local to East Harlem, M15 SBS to East Harlem; NYC Subway: train at First Avenue
Avenue A East 14th Street	Bidirectional	NYC Subway: train at First Avenue
M14A only
East 11th Street Avenue A	Bidirectional	NYC Bus: M8 at East 10th Street
East 5th Street Avenue A	Bidirectional	
East Houston Street Avenue A	Bidirectional	NYC Bus: M9, M21
Delancey Street Essex Street	Bidirectional	NYC Bus: M9, B39; NYC Subway: trains at Delancey Street/Essex Street
Grand Street Essex Street	Bidirectional	NYC Bus: M9
Clinton Street Grand Street	Bidirectional	
Pitt Street Grand Street	Bidirectional	
East Broadway Grand Street	Eastbound	
Jackson Street Grand Street	Eastbound	
Columbia Street Grand Street	Westbound	
Madison Street Jackson Street	Westbound	NYC Bus: M22
FDR Drive Grand Street	Eastbound terminus; Westbound station	NYC Bus: M22 to Battery Park City
M14D only
Avenue B East 14th Street	Bidirectional	
Avenue C East 14th Street	Bidirectional	NYC Bus: M9
East 11th/12th Streets Avenue C	Bidirectional	NYC Bus: M8 at East 10th Street, M9
Avenue D East 10th Street	Bidirectional	NYC Bus: M8 to West Village
East 5th/6th Streets Avenue D	Bidirectional	
East 4th Street Avenue D	Eastbound	
East Houston Street Avenue D	Westbound	NYC Bus: M21
Columbia Street East Houston Street	Eastbound	NYC Bus: M21 to Lower East Side
Mangin Street East Houston Street	Eastbound	NYC Bus: M21 to Lower East Side
555 FDR Drive FDR Drive	Eastbound	NYC Bus: M21 to Lower East Side
FDR Drive Delancey Street	Eastbound	
Rivington Street Columbia Street	Westbound station	NYC Bus: M21 to Soho
Columbia Street Delancey Street	Eastbound terminus; Westbound station	NYC Bus: M21 to Soho

== History ==
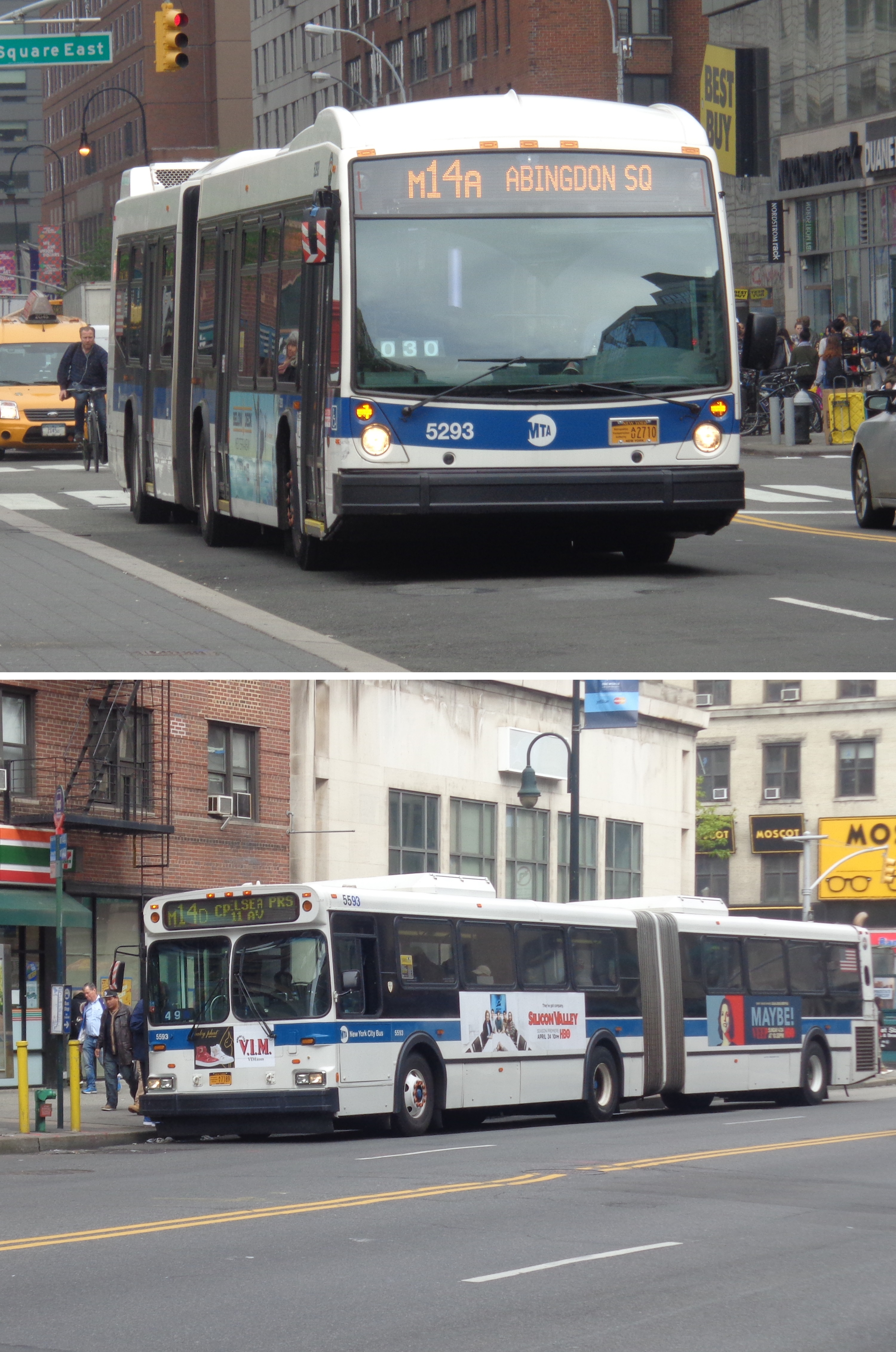
A 2012 Nova Bus LFS Articulated (5293) on the Abingdon Square-bound M14A (top) and a 2003 New Flyer D60HF (5593) on the Chelsea Piers-bound M14D (bottom) along 14th Street in Manhattan, prior to SBS implementation

The tracks were built by several companies and pieced together by the Metropolitan Street Railway by 1899. The Bleecker Street and Fulton Ferry Railroad built the 14th Street tracks west of 9th Avenue, the Central Crosstown Railroad built from 9th Avenue to Union Square, and the Forty-Second Street and Grand Street Ferry Railroad built from Union Square to Avenue A and south on Avenue A. The Metropolitan Crosstown built a short connection at Union Square to connect the two halves, and tracks north on 11th Avenue to the West 23rd Street Ferry.

When the Williamsburg Bridge opened in 1904, 14th Street cars were rerouted to use the bridge (running east on Delancey Street from the one-way pair of Clinton Street northbound and Essex Street southbound), running as the 14th Street-Williamsburg Bridge Line until 1911. Buses were substituted for streetcars by the New York City Omnibus Corporation on April 20, 1936.

Avenue D service was added on January 28, 1951, initially running from Broadway along 14th Street, Avenue D and Columbia Street to Stanton Street, and returning on Cannon Street and Houston Street.

In 1956, New York City Omnibus Corporation became Fifth Avenue Coach Lines; the Manhattan and Bronx Surface Transit Operating Authority (MaBSTOA) subsidiary of the New York City Transit Authority took over operations in 1962.

The route was once operated by the now defunct Hudson Pier Depot and was known only as the M14. When the depot was taken over by the Quill depot, it was separated into three lines, the M14A, M14C and M14D. Following the September 11 attacks, security measures at the Consolidated Edison power plant were tightened, and the block of East 14th Street between Avenue C and Avenue D was closed to the public. Service was consolidated on the Avenue C and Avenue D branches of the M14, with bus service running along Avenue C, East 10th Street, and Avenue D. In May 2002, the MTA announced plans to consolidate the two routes to improve service, and make operations simpler. Eventually it was decided since the route ran primarily on Avenue D the route would be renamed M14D.

From 2004 to 2006, the M14C briefly returned running down Avenue C to Houston Street, then turning east towards Avenue D/Columbia Street and resuming the normal route. This new route began running late and caused confusion with the M21 on Avenue C and eventually service returned to its current state as the M14A and M14D. Afterward, Avenue C was temporarily served by the M21 bus, but since 2010, it has been served by the M9 bus.

=== Select Bus Service ===
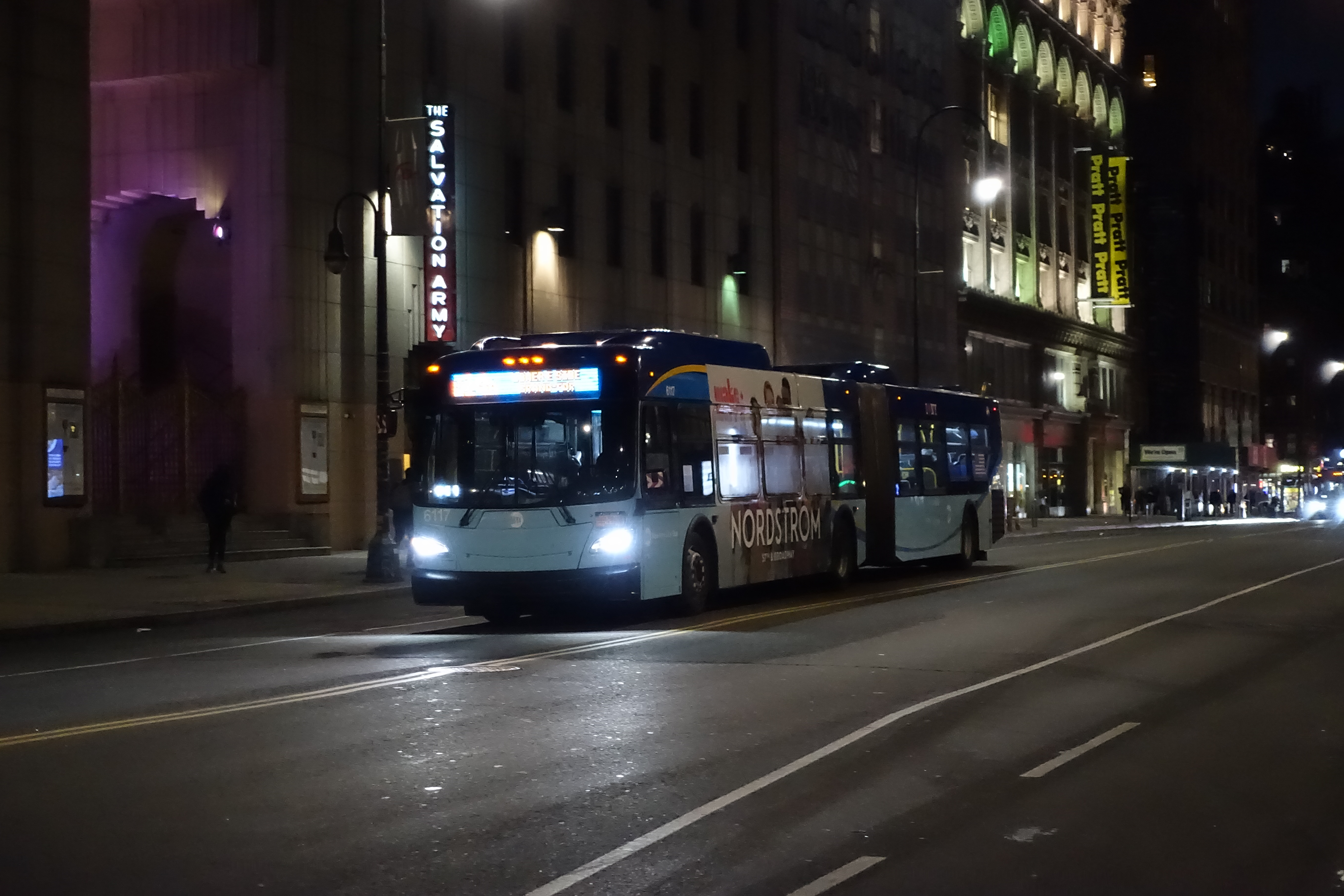
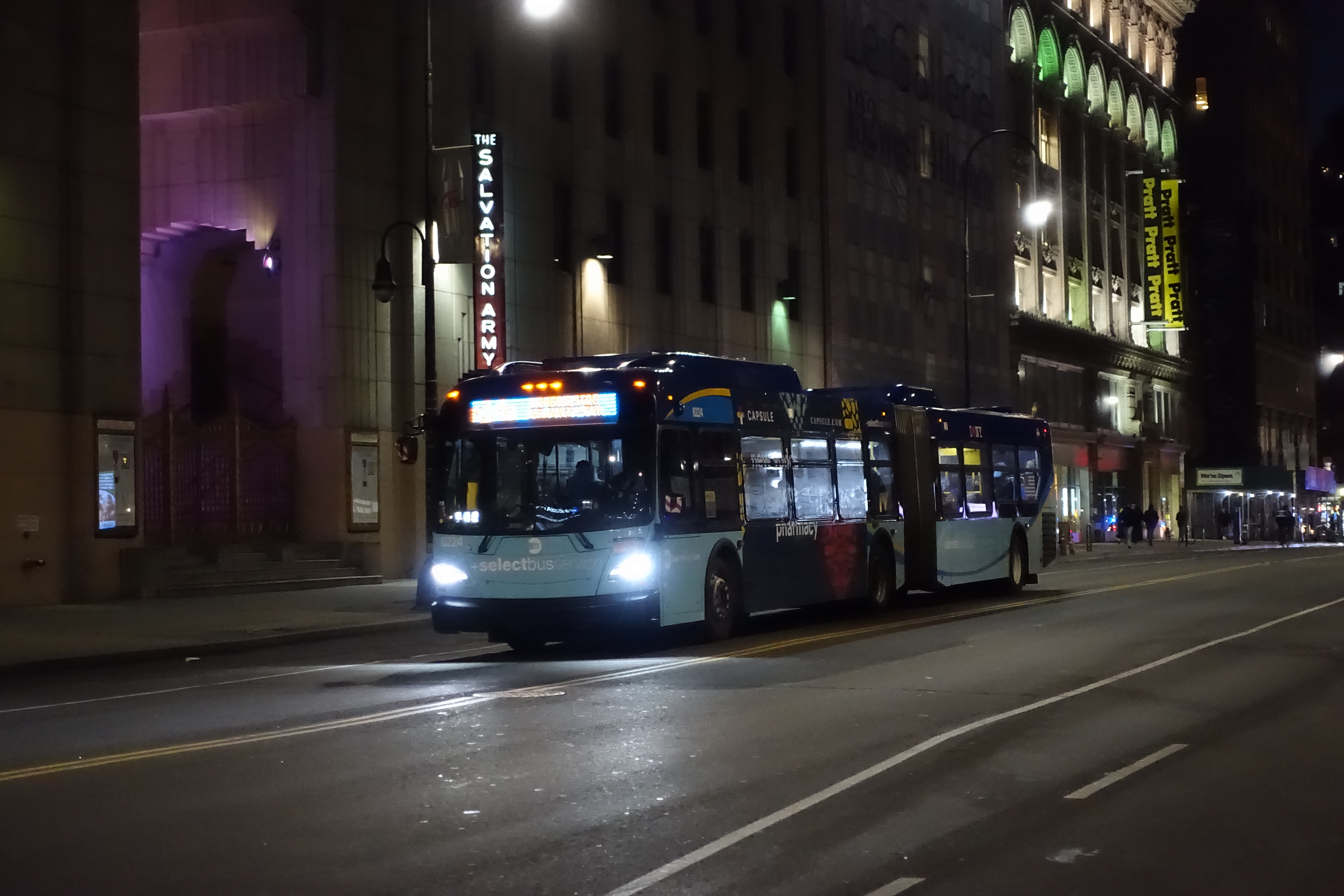
Two XD60s: one 2017 (6117) on the Grand Street-bound M14A SBS, and one 2019 (6224) on the Delancey Street-bound M14D SBS, at 14th Street/6th Avenue in Chelsea/Greenwich Village, Manhattan in January 2022.

In April 2019, a Select Bus Service line was planned to run along 14th Street to provide alternate service during the original L train shutdown plan. Service was expected to operate from Ninth Avenue to Avenue C, then turn north along Avenue C to 20th Street, where there would be a ferry transfer. This route was to be another branch supplementing the existing M14A/D designation, but the existing lines would not be converted to Select Bus Service. To facilitate bus trips on the M14 corridor, the 14th Street busway would be implemented, turning parts of 14th Street into a bus-only street during rush hours. The Select Bus Service route was to be implemented by January 6, 2019, three months before the tunnel was set to shut down. It was to initially run with five stops in each direction between First Avenue/14th Street and 10th Avenue/14th Street. Local service on the M14A and M14D would be retained with minor modifications. One or two weeks before the tunnel would originally close, the M14 SBS was to be extended to Stuyvesant Cove. The M14A/D local and the M14 SBS would be able to serve a combined 84,000 passengers every hour, with a bus every two minutes during rush hours. During late night hours, the M14 SBS would be replaced by the L14 SBS route to the Bedford Avenue station in Brooklyn. After the 14th Street Tunnel work was completed, some version of M14 SBS service would continue operating.

On January 4, 2019, Governor Andrew Cuomo announced that the L train shutdown would be modified. An alternate plan of weekend and late-night construction would be executed instead, therefore putting the initial M14 SBS plan in limbo. New York City Transit later announced that it still planned to implement SBS along the corridor, and continued to work with the DOT on a plan for permanent service. The preliminary plan was to convert both the M14A and M14D routes into SBS routes. On March 6, 2019, the NYCDOT met with elected officials and revealed plans to implement Select Bus Service on both the M14A and the M14D in June 2019, with an accelerated timeline to provide an alternative to L service. The implementation of bus lanes on the branches on the Lower East Side was to be implemented later on. Bus stops on each branch would be spaced out to speed up service. The M14A's terminal loop through Abingdon Square was to be implemented on a 9-month trial due to difficulty of bus operations there, as well as complaints of buses laying over in the Abingdon Square area. If the terminal was eliminated during or after the trial, service would be extended to Tenth Avenue. As of May 2022, the M14A continues to serve Abingdon Square at all times. Bus lanes would either make use of the busway layout intended for the Tunnel shutdown or would consist of standard bus lanes.

In April 2019, the busway was added back to the plan. SBS was later pushed back to July 1, 2019. However, due to a lawsuit, the busway was not implemented as scheduled, and after another delay that August, went into effect on October 3, 2019. The busway was so successful on its first day that M14 buses had to be slowed down in order to keep from running ahead of their posted schedules. In December 2019, the M14A/D SBS were the launch routes for the MTA's new battery-electric New Flyer Xcelsior XE60 buses.

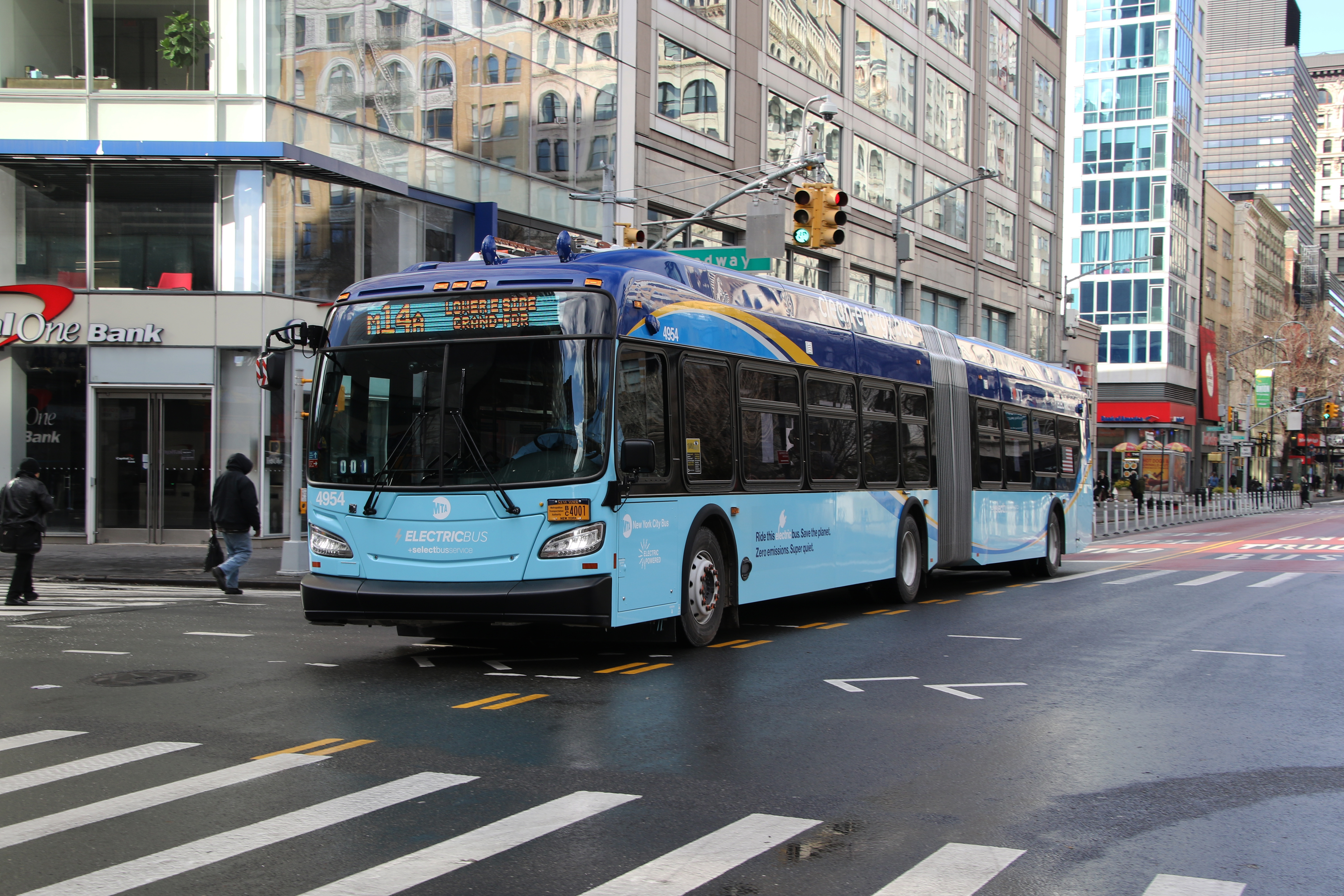
A 2019 XE60 (4954) on the Lower East Side-bound M14A SBS at East 14th Street/Broadway (Union Square)

== Incidents ==
On February 12, 2014, a bus driver named William Peña was operating an eastbound M14 bus when there was a crash on Seventh Avenue. Someone stole a delivery truck who drove past the red light and crashed into the bus, sending it into a building. The scaffolding fell onto the bus, and Peña was killed. In memory of the driver, the MTA re-numbered the bus involved in the accident.
