= M15 (New York City bus) =

Bus route in Manhattan, New York

m15 m15
- First and Second Avenues Line
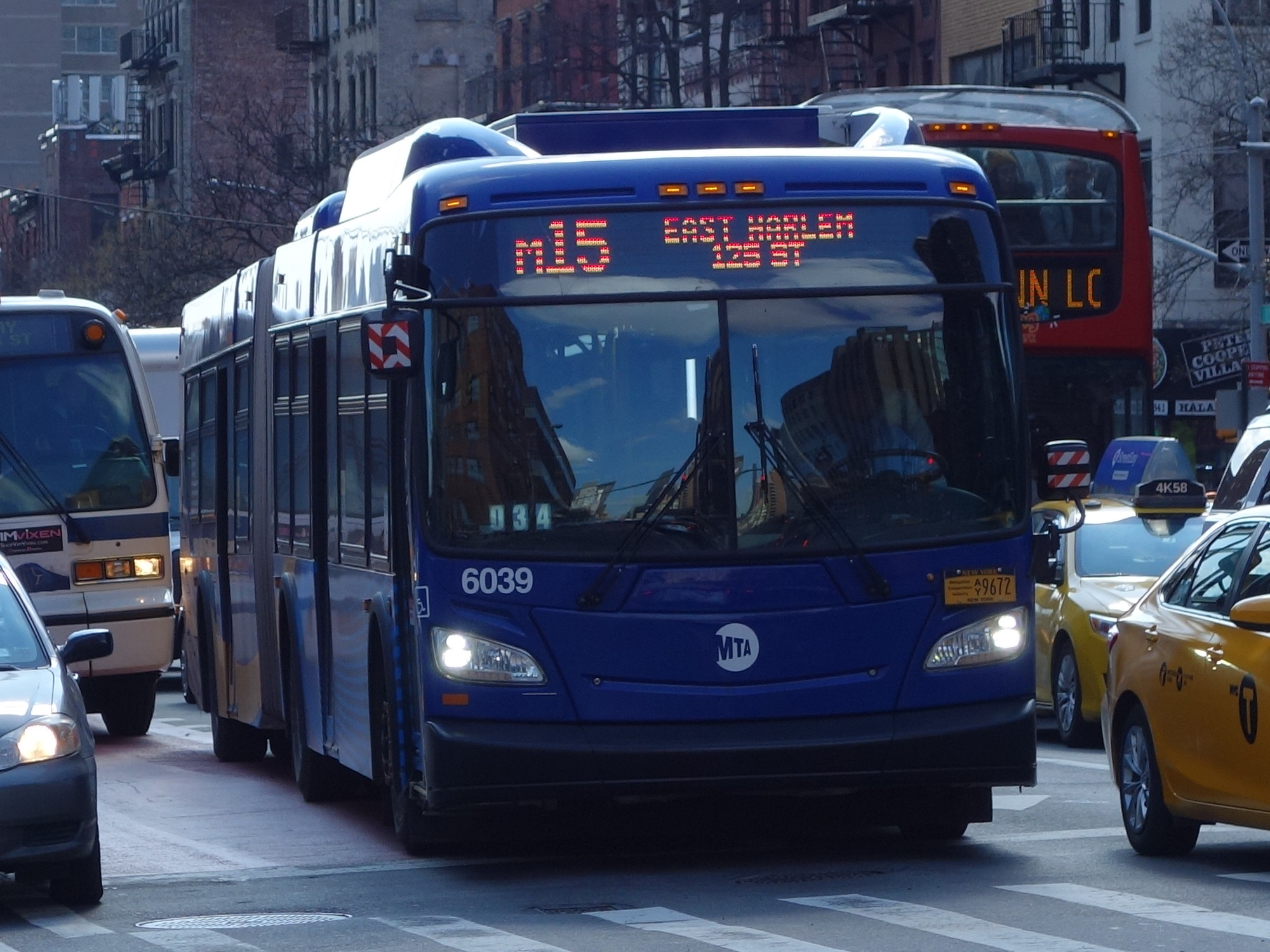
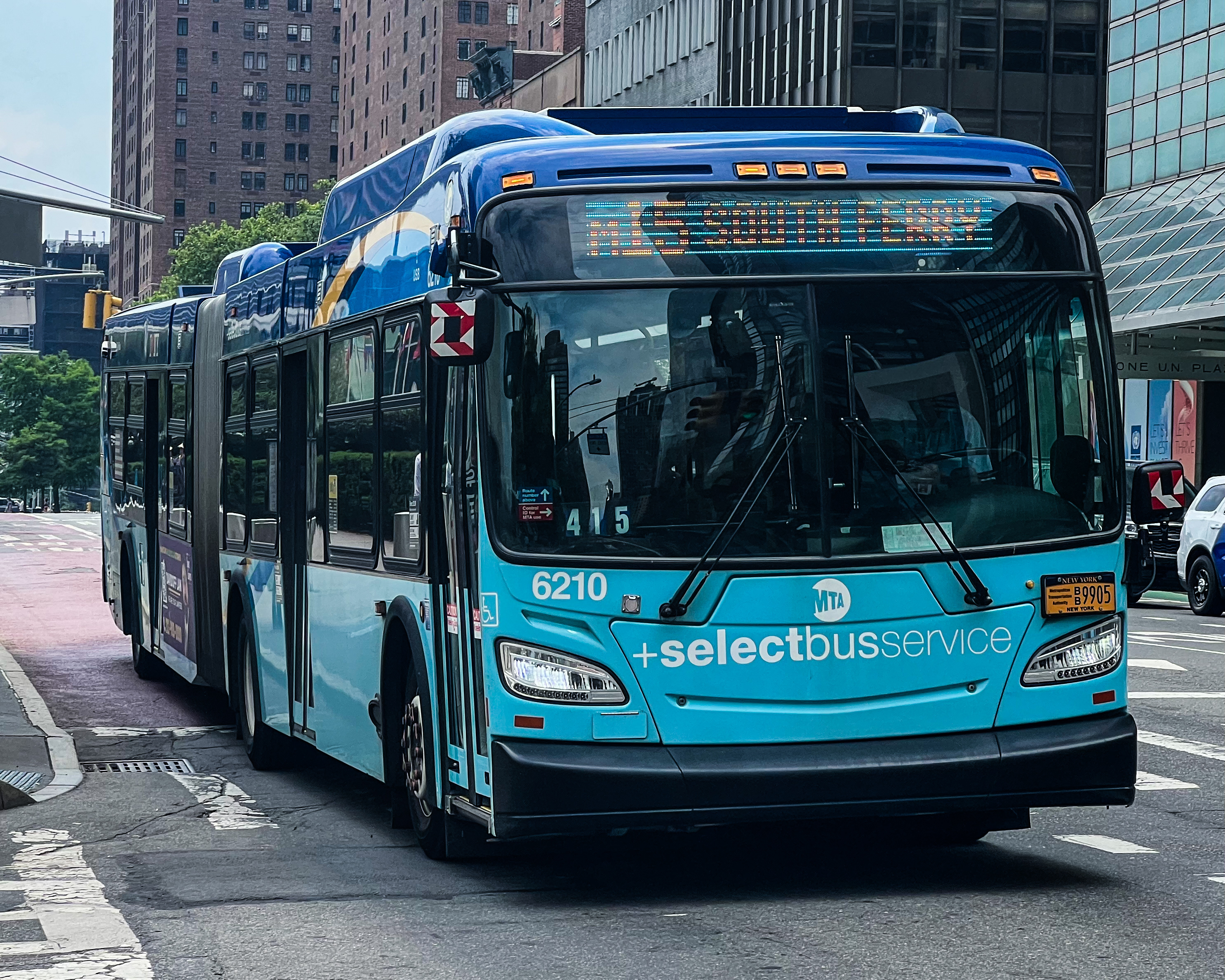
- A 2017 XD60 (6039) on the Harlem-bound M15 local and a 2019 XD60 (6210) on the South Ferry-bound M15 SBS

Overview
- System: MTA Regional Bus Operations
- Operator: Manhattan and Bronx Surface Transit Operating Authority
- Garage: Tuskegee Airmen Depot (local); Mother Clara Hale Depot (SBS)
- Vehicle: Nova Bus LFS articulated New Flyer Xcelsior XD60 (main vehicles); Nova Bus LFS; Nova Bus LFS HEV (local supplemental service); New Flyer Xcelsior XDE40 (SBS supplemental service)
- Livery: M15 SBS: Select Bus Service

Route
- Locale: Manhattan, New York, U.S.
- Communities served: East Harlem, Upper East Side, Yorkville, Lenox Hill, Turtle Bay, Murray Hill, Kips Bay, Gramercy Park, East Village, Lower East Side, Chinatown, Financial District
- Landmarks served: Manhattan Bridge, Brooklyn Bridge, United Nations
- Start: East Harlem – 126th Street
- Via: First Avenue (northbound); Second Avenue (southbound); Allen Street; Water Street
- End: Pike Street / Cherry Street (local only); South Ferry (both variants)
- Length: 8.6 miles (13.8 km) (southbound)

Service
- Operates: 24 hours; no SBS or Cherry Street service at night
- Annual patronage: 11,963,784 (2025)
- Transfers: Yes
- Timetable: M15 M15 SBS

The First and Second Avenues Line, also known as the Second Avenue Line, is a bus route in Manhattan, New York City, running mostly along Second Avenue (and northbound on First Avenue since 1951) from Lower Manhattan to East Harlem. Originally a streetcar line along Second Avenue, it is now the M15 bus route, the busiest bus route in the city and United States, carrying 57,000 riders daily and 16.4 million riders annually. MTA Regional Bus Operations, under the New York City Bus and Select Bus Service brands, operates the local out of the Tuskegee Airmen Bus Depot and the SBS from the Mother Clara Hale Bus Depot. Service is operated with articulated buses, unless supplemental service is needed.

== History ==
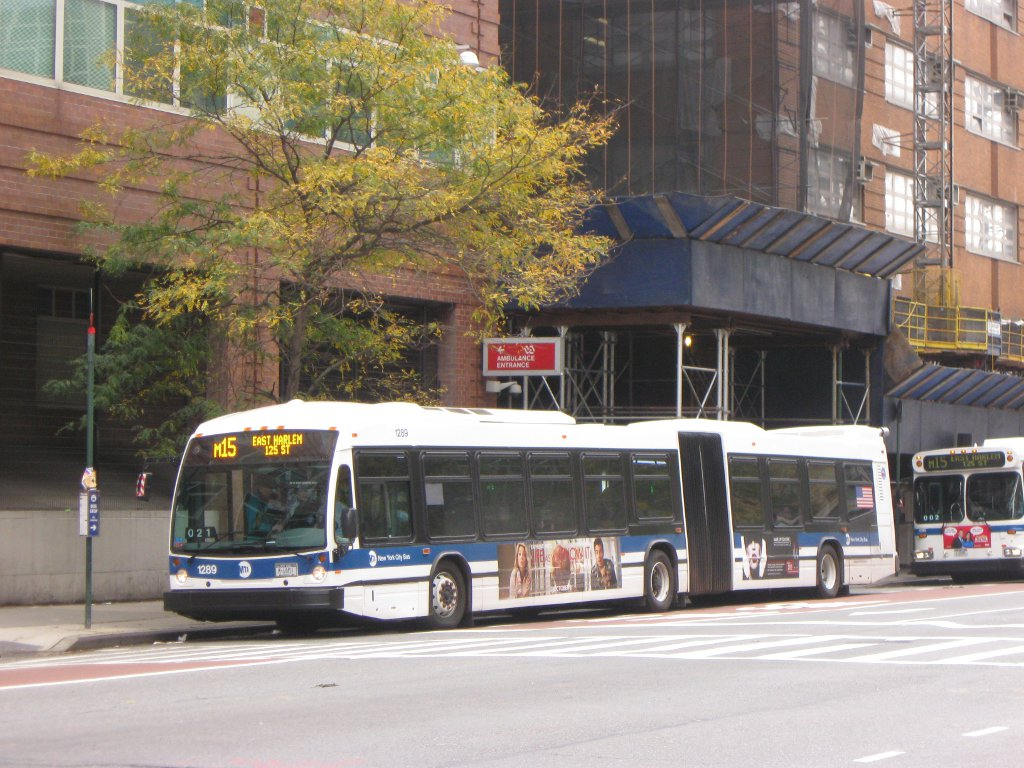
A 2010 Nova Bus LFS Articulated (1289) and a New Flyer D60HF on the M15 stop at VA Hospital, heading to East Harlem.

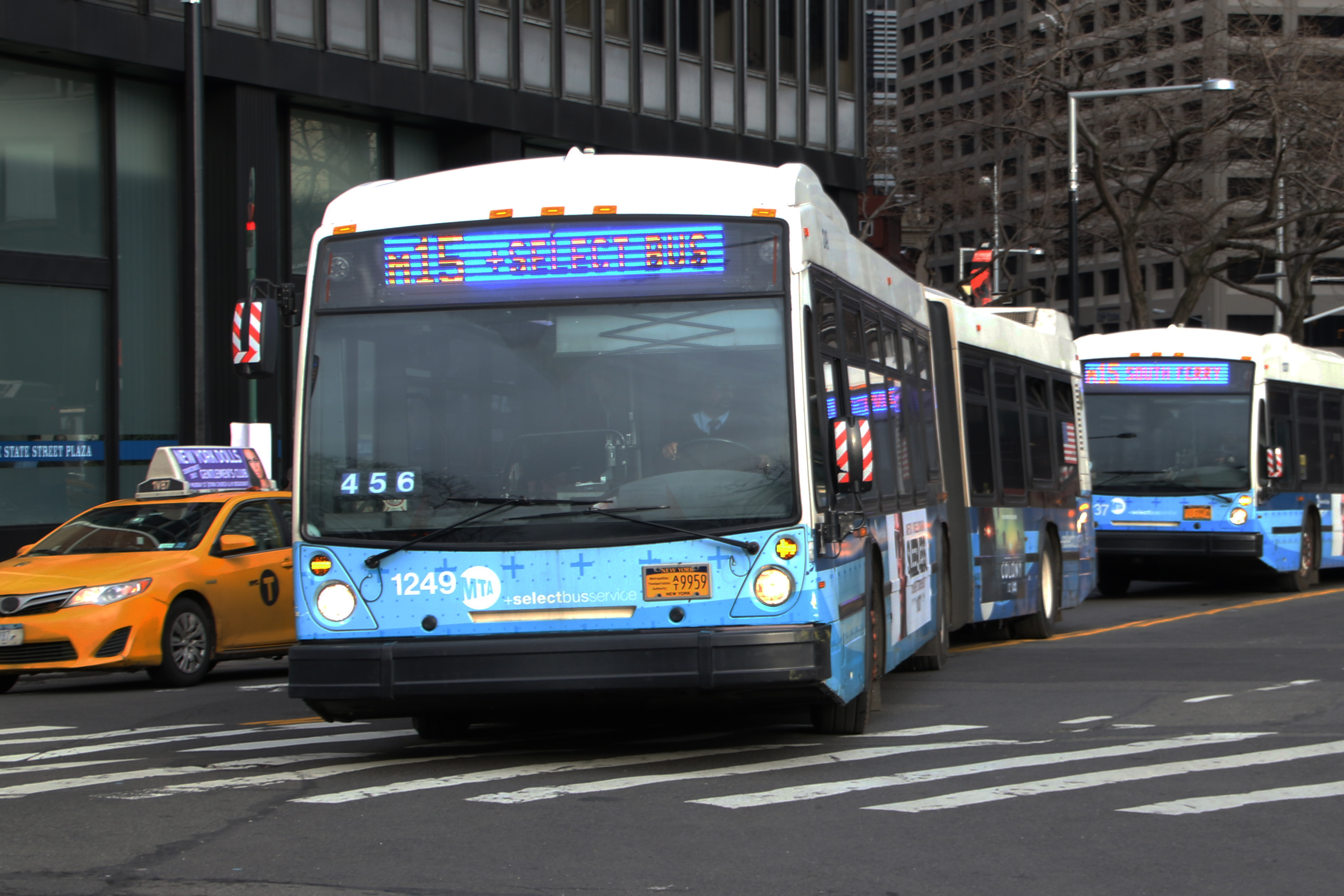
Two 2010 Nova Bus LFS Articulates (1249 & 1237) on the M15 SBS approaching South Ferry

The Second Avenue Railroad opened the line in 1853 and 1854, from Peck Slip on the East River north along Pearl Street, Bowery (shared with the Third Avenue Line), Grand Street, Chrystie Street, and Second Avenue to East Harlem. A short branch was later built along Stuyvesant Street and Astor Place to end at Broadway in NoHo. The Metropolitan Street Railway leased the line in January 1898, and on April 3 the line from Astor Place to Manhattan was electrified. The original line was later electrified to the Bowery, where streetcars used the Third Avenue Line to City Hall, and the line to Peck Slip was abandoned.

Buses were substituted for streetcars by the East Side Omnibus Corporation on June 25, 1933. The New York City Board of Transportation took over operations in 1948, with the New York City Transit Authority (NYCTA) replacing it in 1953.

Limited-stop service began on September 13, 1976, with buses making only 15 stops, spaced every eight blocks, between 126th Street and Houston Street, saving riders up to 23 minutes. Limited-stop service ran every six minutes on weekdays, heading southbound in the morning, between 7:12 and 9:21 a.m., and northbound in the afternoon, between 4:12 and 6:11 p.m. These buses were identified by signs on the lower right side of the windshield. As part of the project, new dedicated bus lanes were installed.

On September 7, 1987, a public hearing was held to discuss the NYCTA's plan to reduce the span of weekend evening M15 service to City Hall and Park Row from ending at 12:40 a.m. to ending at 8:10 p.m.. In addition, the hours of weekday service were to be lengthened slightly. The changes were to be made to provide a more uniform service frequency and service pattern.

On January 13, 1997, 108 more limited-stop trips were added on weekdays. In June 2002 as part of an outside study, the First/Second Avenues corridor was identified for the implementation of bus rapid transit (BRT) service, due to heavy ridership and slow travel speeds on the corridor. In November 2002, the MTA Board voted to lengthen the span of weekday evening southbound service by one hour to 7:50 p.m., weekday northbound service by 1.5 hours to 9:45 p.m., the span of northbound evening Saturday service by one hour to 8:25 p.m., and the span of northbound Sunday service to 8:10 p.m.. The service increase was expected to result in no change in costs initially. Though the change was initially expected to take effect in March 2003, it was implemented on April 14, 2003.

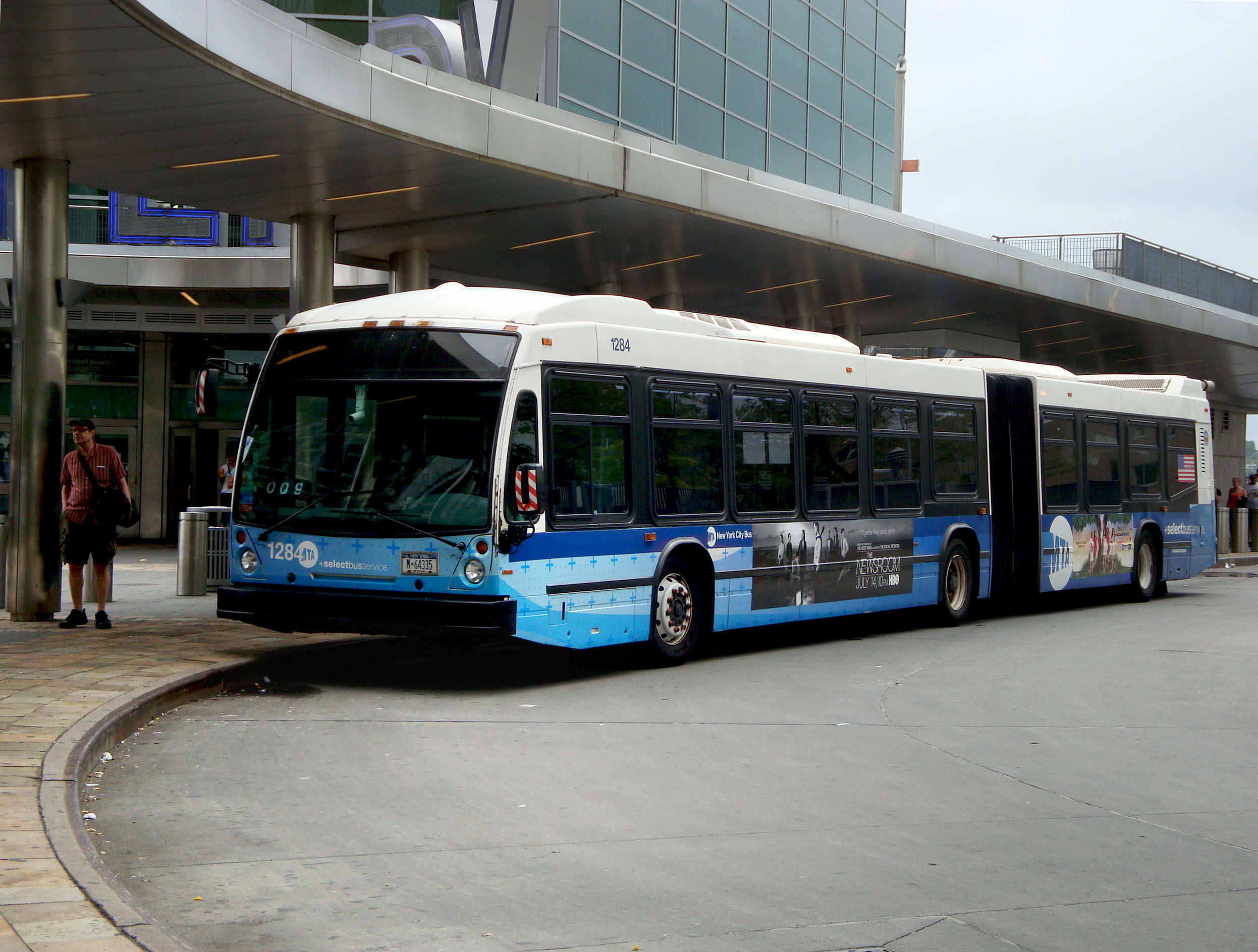
A 2010 Nova Bus LFS Articulated (1284) on the M15 SBS laying over at South Ferry

In late 2004, the Metropolitan Transportation Authority (MTA) and the New York City Department of Transportation selected the route as one of the candidates for bus rapid transit service, along with Fordham Road (since implemented), Nostrand Avenue, Merrick Boulevard, and Hylan Boulevard. This evolved into Phase I of the Select Bus Service (SBS) program in 2006. On October 10, 2010, service began on the M15 Select Bus Service, replacing limited stop service. Limited buses made all stops south of Houston Street. Prior to the implementation of the M15 SBS, previous M15 Limited stops were eliminated at St Mark's Place and East 72nd Street north of Houston Street. Several stops south of Houston Street were also eliminated. Due to the construction of the Second Avenue Subway, the M15 SBS initially had no stop at 72nd Street, even though that was a major street that had been served by limited-stop buses. Both the M15 local and M15 SBS were previously assigned to the 126th Street Depot until January 4, 2015.

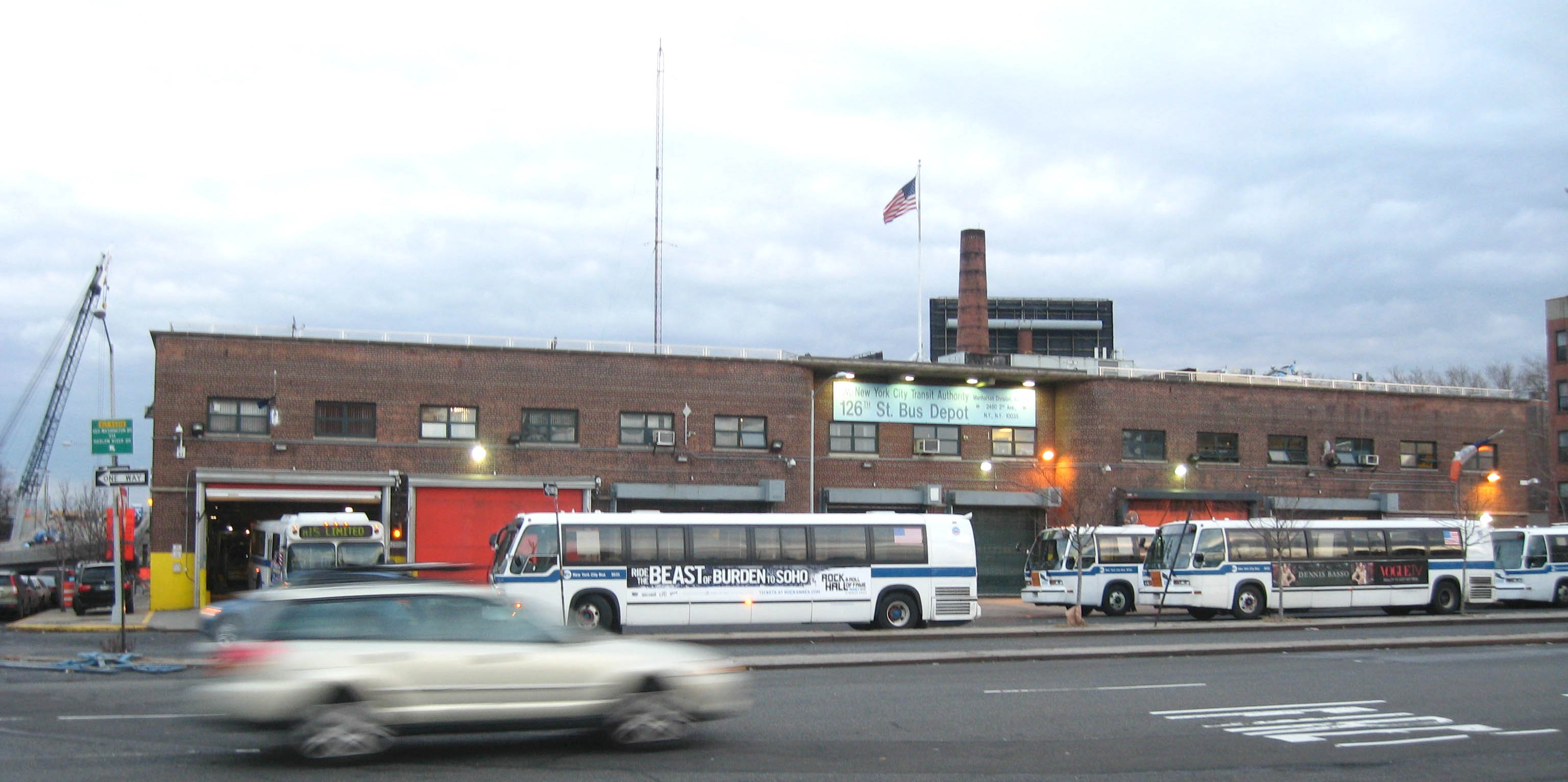
A D60HF leaving 126th Street Depot onto the M15 Limited, plus four RTSs outside the depot

== Route description ==
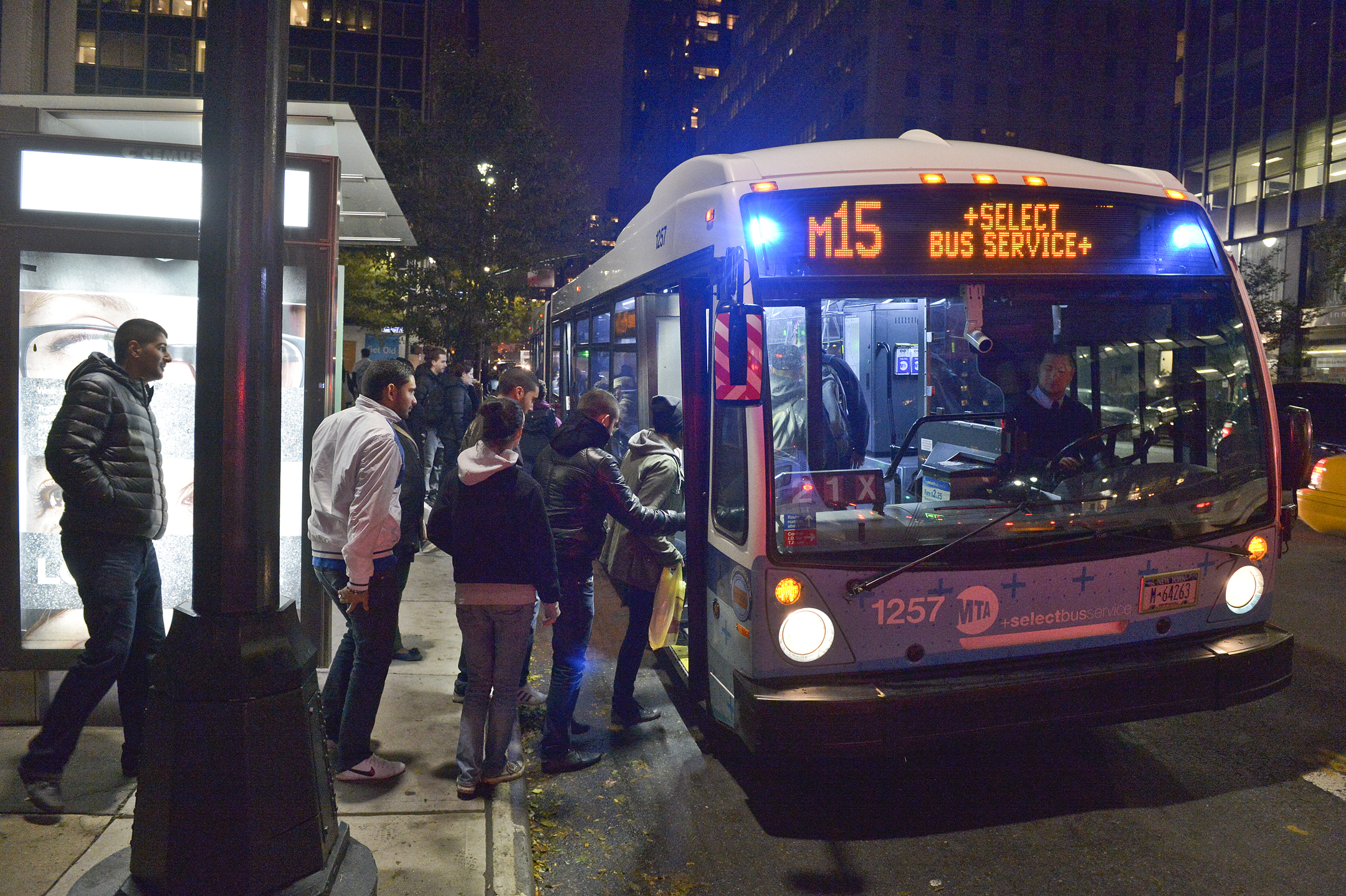

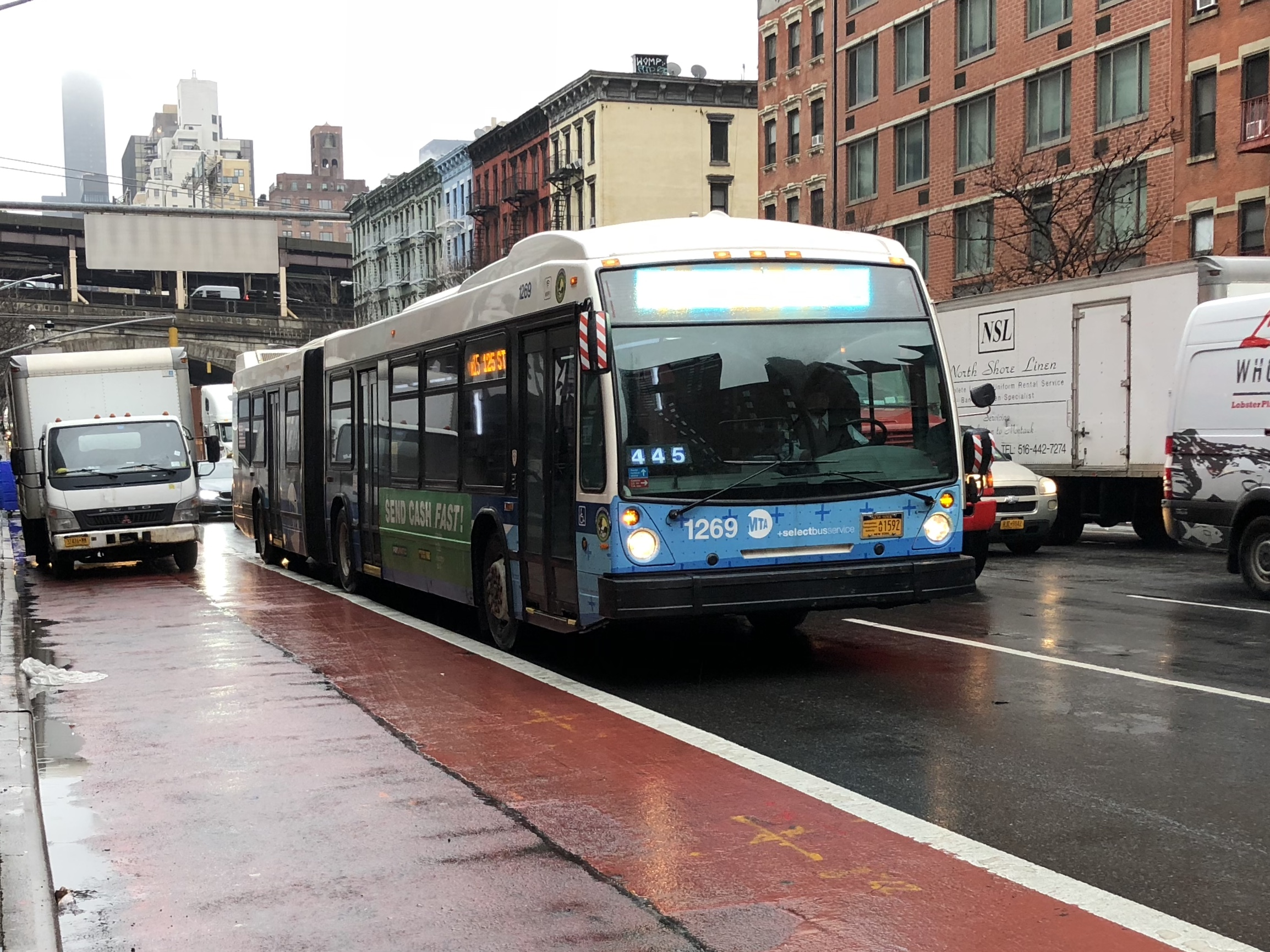
Two 2010 Nova Bus LFS Articulates on the M15 SBS: 1257 to South Ferry, during the discontinued blue light era, and 1269 to 125th St at East 62nd Street/1st Avenue, during the current blue signage era

The M15 runs between South Ferry in the Financial District and 126th Street in East Harlem. Southbound service use Second Avenue it makes a right onto East Houston Street, a left onto Allen Street. The buses travel along Madison Street, make a turn onto Pike Street, and northbound service use First Avenue. During the daytime and evening hours, local service alternates between Whitehall Street and Pike Street / Cherry Street. During AM Rush Hour, some Select Bus Service trips originate or terminate at Houston Street. Overnight service is provided by local buses only, serving Whitehall Street-South Ferry. Select Bus Service trips terminate at the South Ferry bus loop. By then, the MTA had discontinued service to City Hall due to budget cuts.

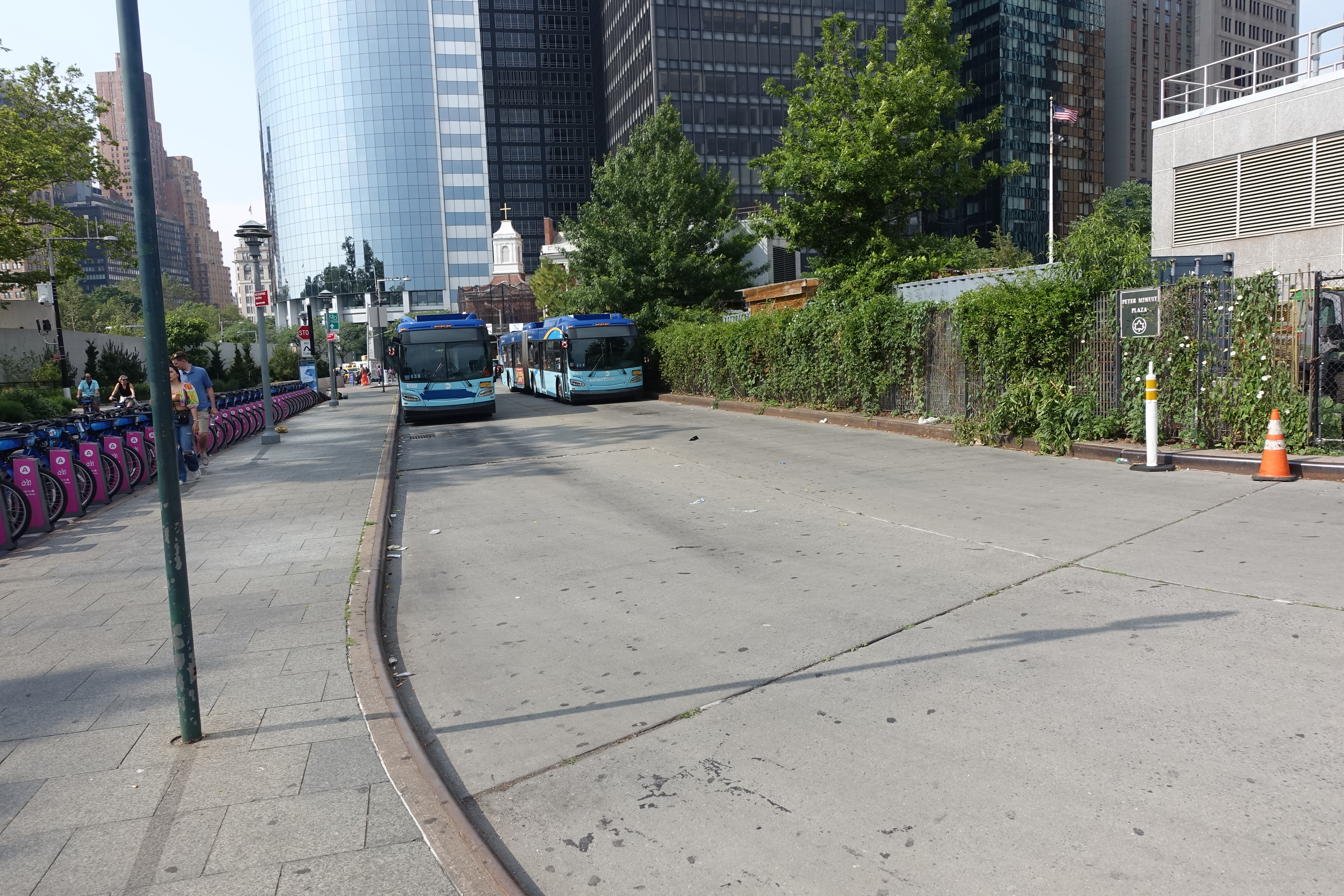
Two 2017 XD60s (6102 & 6103) on the M15 SBS laying over in the South Ferry Bus Loop at South Street/Peter Minuit Place in Lower Manhattan in June 2023, after terminated.

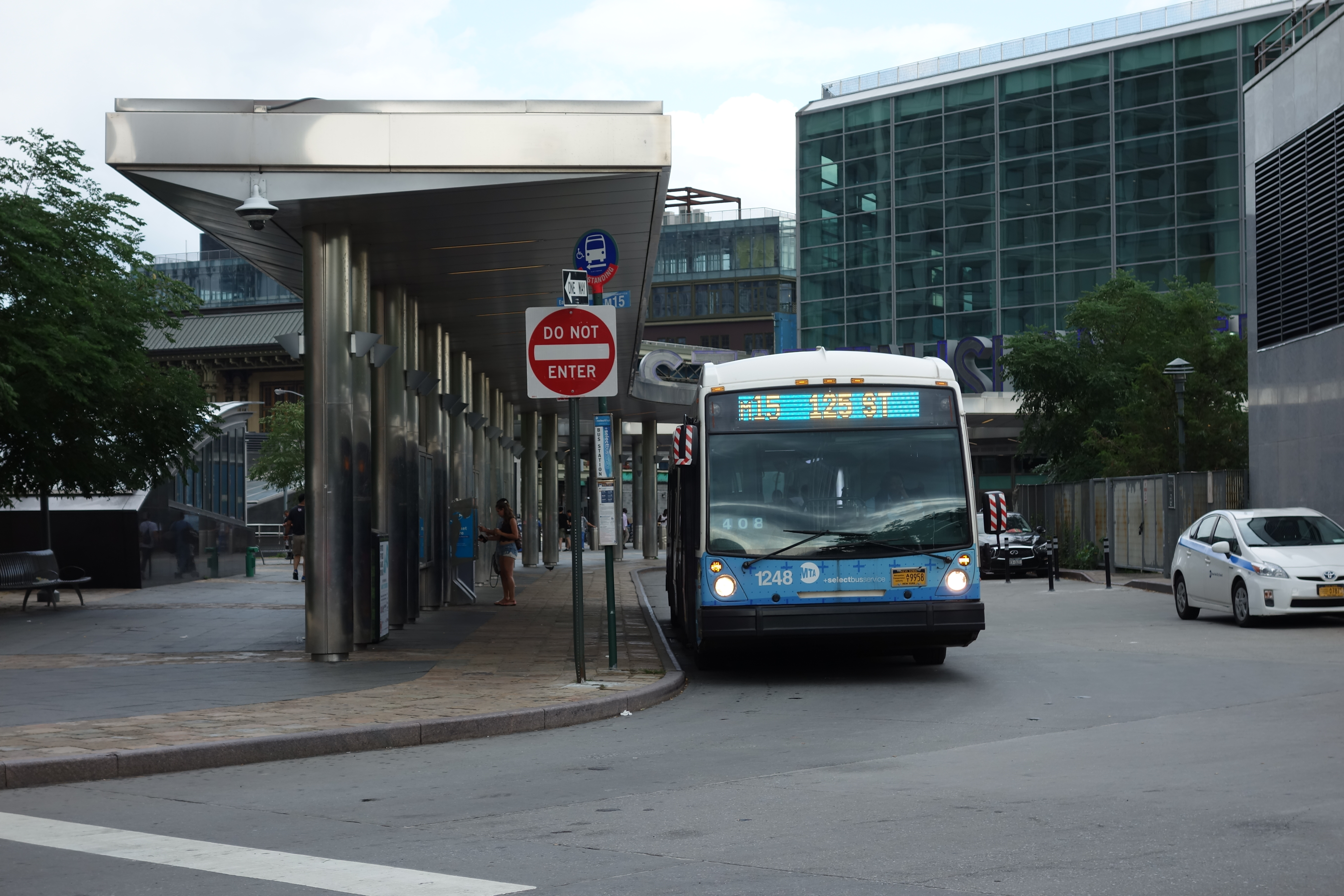
A 2010 Nova Bus LFS Articulated (1248) on the M15 SBS at South Ferry, waiting to leave for 125th Street in August 2018

=== Select Bus Service Stops ===
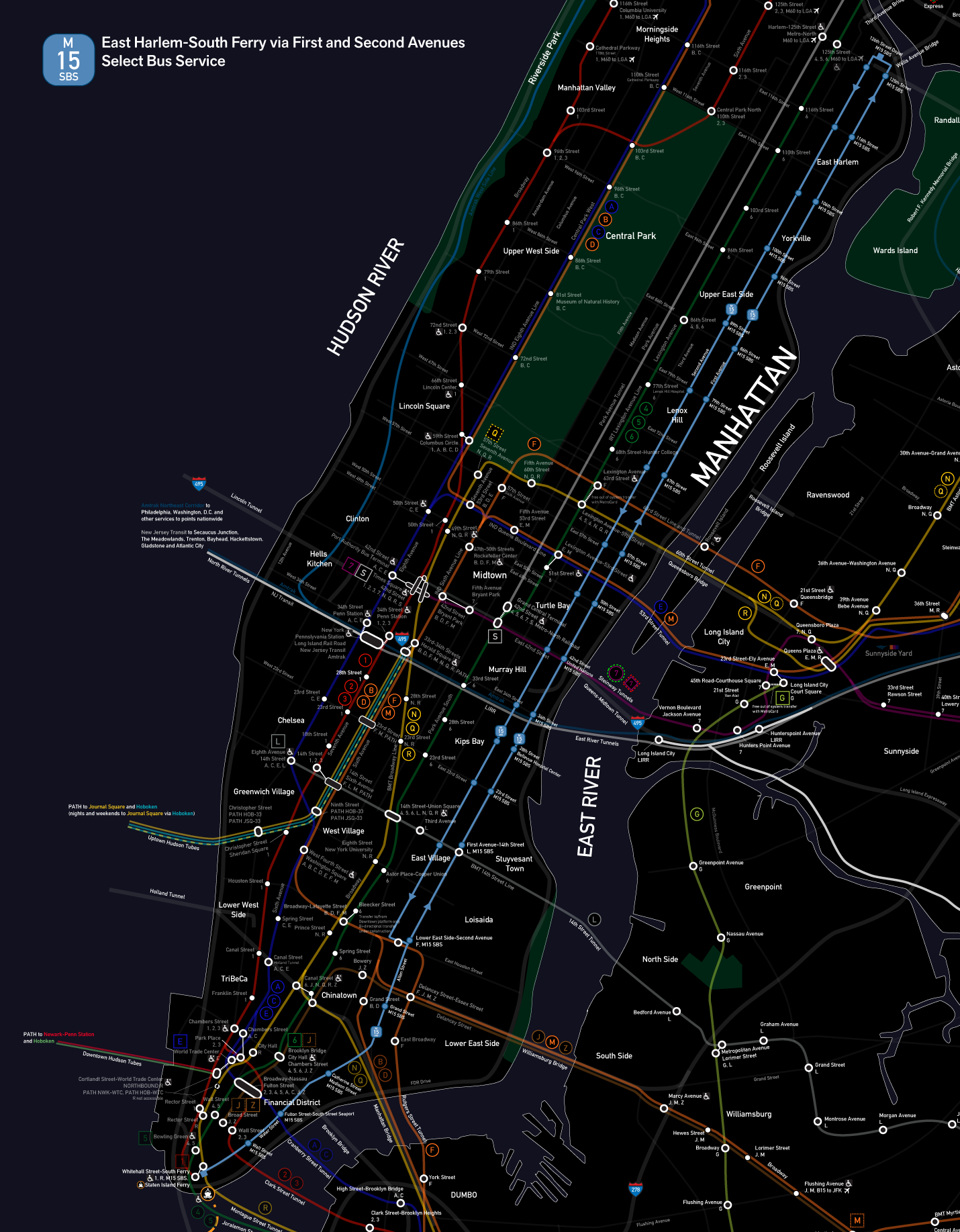
A geographically correct map of the M15 Select Bus Service, showing all stations and connections. The route is shown in turquoise.

| Station Street traveled | Direction | Connections |
|---|---|---|
| 126th Street | Northbound terminus, southbound station | NYC Bus: M15 Local |
| 125th Street | Bidirectional | NYC Bus: M15 Local, M35, M60 SBS, M125 |
| 115th / 116th Streets | Bidirectional | NYC Bus: M15 Local, M116 (at 116th Street) |
| 106th Street | Bidirectional | NYC Bus: M15 Local, M106 |
| 95th / 97th Streets Metropolitan Hospital | Bidirectional | NYC Bus: M15 Local, M96; NYC Subway: at 96th Street |
| 86th Street | Bidirectional | NYC Bus: M15 Local, M86 SBS; NYC Subway: at 86th Street |
| 79th Street | Bidirectional | NYC Bus: M15 Local, M79 SBS |
| 67th / 68th Streets | Bidirectional | NYC Bus: M15 Local, M66 |
| 57th / 58th Streets | Bidirectional | NYC Bus: M15 Local, M31, M57, MTA Bus: Q32, Q60, Roosevelt Island Tram |
| 50th Street | Bidirectional | NYC Bus: M15 Local, M50 |
| 42nd / 44th Streets United Nations | Bidirectional | NYC Bus: M15 Local, M42 |
| 34th Street NYU Langone Medical Center | Bidirectional | NYC Bus: M15 Local, M34/M34A SBS (M34A westbound only on First Avenue) |
| 28th / 29th Streets Bellevue Hospital | Bidirectional | NYC Bus: M15 Local, M9, M34A SBS |
| 23rd / 25th Streets VA Hospital | Bidirectional | NYC Bus: M15 Local, M9, M23 SBS, M34A SBS |
| 14th Street | Bidirectional | NYC Bus: M14A SBS, M14D SBS, M15 Local; NYC Subway: train at First Avenue (northbound only) |
| First Street | Northbound only | NYC Bus: M15 Local, M21; NYC Subway: trains at Second Avenue |
Northbound service uses First Avenue, southbound service uses Second Avenue
| Houston Street | Southbound only | NYC Bus: M15 Local, M21; NYC Subway: trains at Second Avenue |
| Hester / Grand Streets | Bidirectional | NYC Bus: M15 Local; NYC Subway: trains at Grand Street |
| Catherine Street Madison Street | Bidirectional | NYC Bus: M15 Local, M22 (eastbound only |
| Fulton Street South Street Seaport | Bidirectional | NYC Bus: M15 Local; Downtown Connection: Downtown Loop |
| Wall Street Water Street | Bidirectional | NYC Bus: M15 Local; Downtown Connection: Downtown Loop |
| South Ferry Whitehall Terminal | Southbound terminal, northbound station | NYC Bus: M15 Local, M20, M55; NYC Subway: trains at South Ferry/Whitehall Street; Staten Island Ferry |

== Incidents ==
On July 5, 2024, an operator was driving an M15 SBS bus uptown on First Avenue and was in the dedicated bus lane when a taxi swerved into the lane at 74th Street. The operator avoided the taxi and ended up crashing into a tree on the sidewalk. He and two passengers on the bus were injured.

An Xclesior XD60 (6079) operating on the M15 local bus to Harlem in 2017
