= 17th and 18th Streets Crosstown Line =

The 17th and 18th Streets Crosstown Line was a public transit line in Manhattan, New York City, United States, running mostly along 14th Street, 17th Street, and 18th Street from the West 14th Street Ferry in Chelsea and Christopher Street Ferry in the West Village to the East 23rd Street Ferry at Peter Cooper Village. It was not replaced with a trolley line or bus route when it was abandoned in 1913.

== History ==
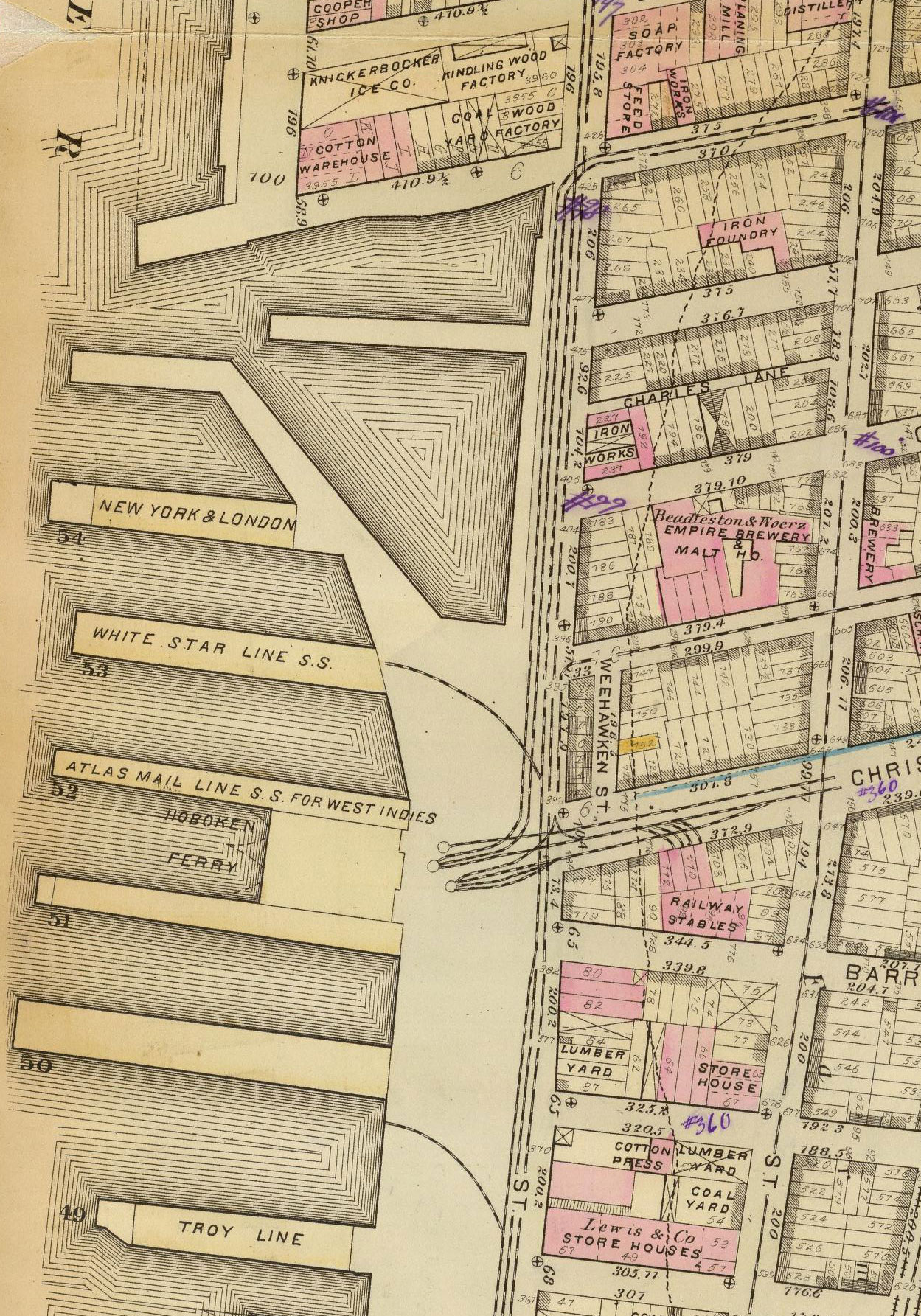
1879 map of the Christopher Street Ferry area, including the 17th and 18th Streets Crosstown Line, 8th Street Crosstown Line, and West Belt Line

The Central Crosstown Railroad was chartered March 28, 1873, and opened within a few years. The original line began at the Christopher Street Ferry and ran north on West Street (west of the Central Park, North and East River trackage), northeast on 11th Street, north on 7th Avenue (along Broadway and Seventh Avenue Railroad trackage), east on 14th Street to Union Square, north on Broadway (also Broadway and Seventh Avenue Railroad trackage), east on 17th Street (eastbound) and 18th Street (westbound), north on 1st Avenue (Central Park, North and East River Railroad trackage), and east on 23rd Street. Another line opened later, continuing west on 14th Street, including Bleecker Street and Fulton Ferry Railroad trackage west of 9th Avenue.

The company leased the Christopher and Tenth Street Railroad, which also ran east from the Christopher Street Ferry, on May 28, 1890, and the Central Crosstown was acquired by the Metropolitan Street Railway in May 1897, though not leased until February 8, 1904. By 1907, the line to the Christopher Street Ferry was gone, and the 14th Street-Williamsburg Bridge Line used the 14th Street trackage west of Union Square. Instead, 17th and 18th Streets cars continued south from Union Square on University Place on a remnant of the original Broadway Line, ending at 8th Street. Service was terminated in 1913.
