= Houston Street =

Street in Manhattan, New York

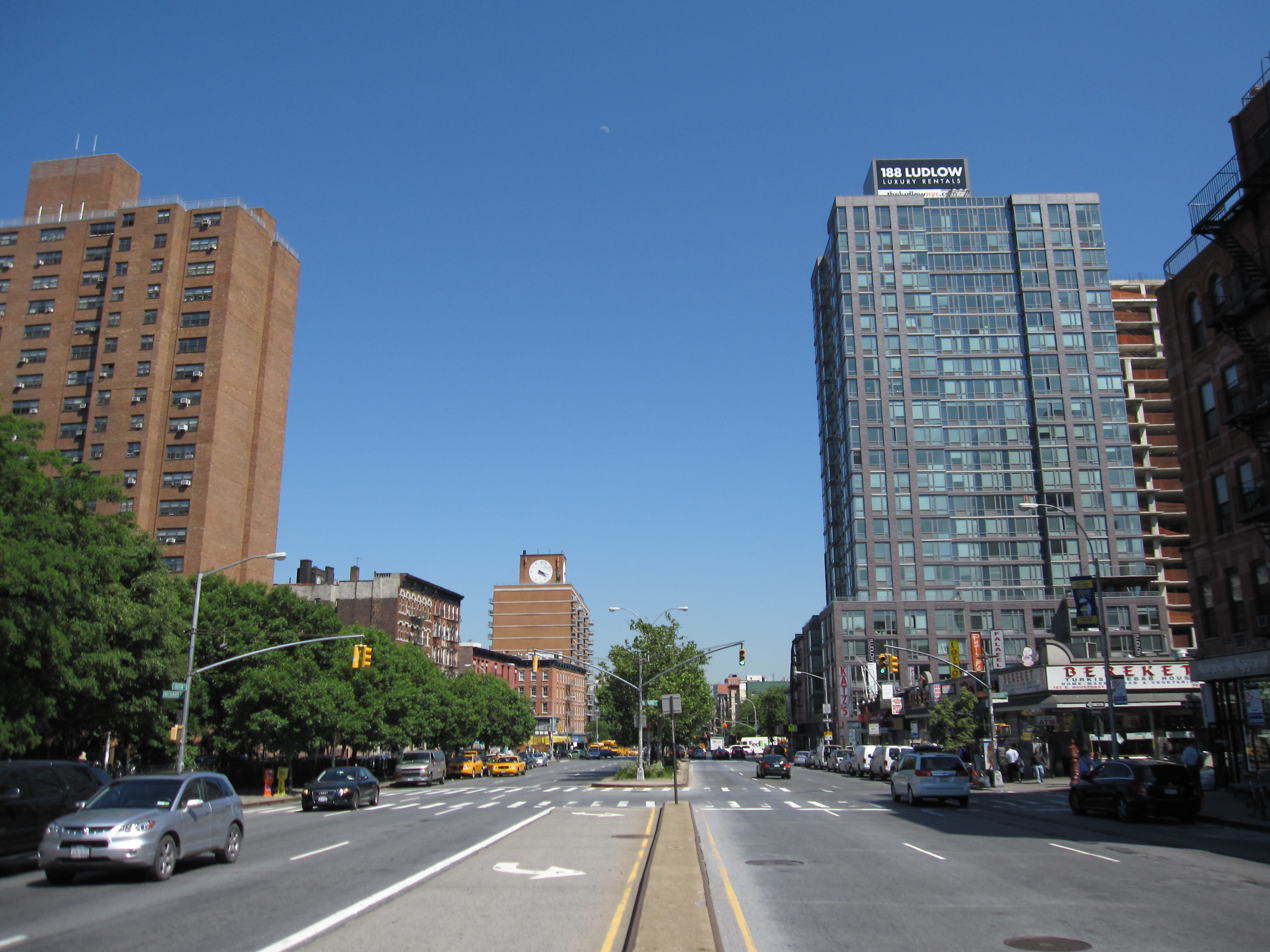
- Looking east from Orchard Street
- Interactive map of Houston Street
- Namesake: William Houstoun
- Length: 2.0 mi (3.2 km)
- Location: New York County, New York, United States
- ZIP Codes: 10002, 10009, 10012, 10014
- West end: NY 9A/West Side Highway
- East end: Franklin D. Roosevelt East River Drive (FDR Drive)

Houston Street (/ˈhaʊstən/ HOW-stən) is a major east–west thoroughfare in Lower Manhattan in New York City, New York. It runs the full width of the island of Manhattan, from FDR Drive along the East River in the east to the West Side Highway along the Hudson River in the west. The street is divided into west and east sections by Broadway.

Houston Street generally serves as the boundary between neighborhoods on the East Side of Manhattan—Alphabet City, the East Village, NoHo, Greenwich Village, and the West Village to the north; and the Lower East Side, most of the Bowery, Nolita, and SoHo to the south. The numeric street-naming grid in Manhattan, created as part of the Commissioners' Plan of 1811, begins immediately north of Houston Street with 1st Street at Avenue A.

The street's name is pronounced "HOW-stən" (/ˈhaʊstən/), in contrast to the city of Houston, Texas, whose name is pronounced "HYOO-stən" (/ˈhjuːstən/). The street was named for William Houstoun, whose surname was pronounced "HOW-stən", while the city was named for Sam Houston.

== Description ==
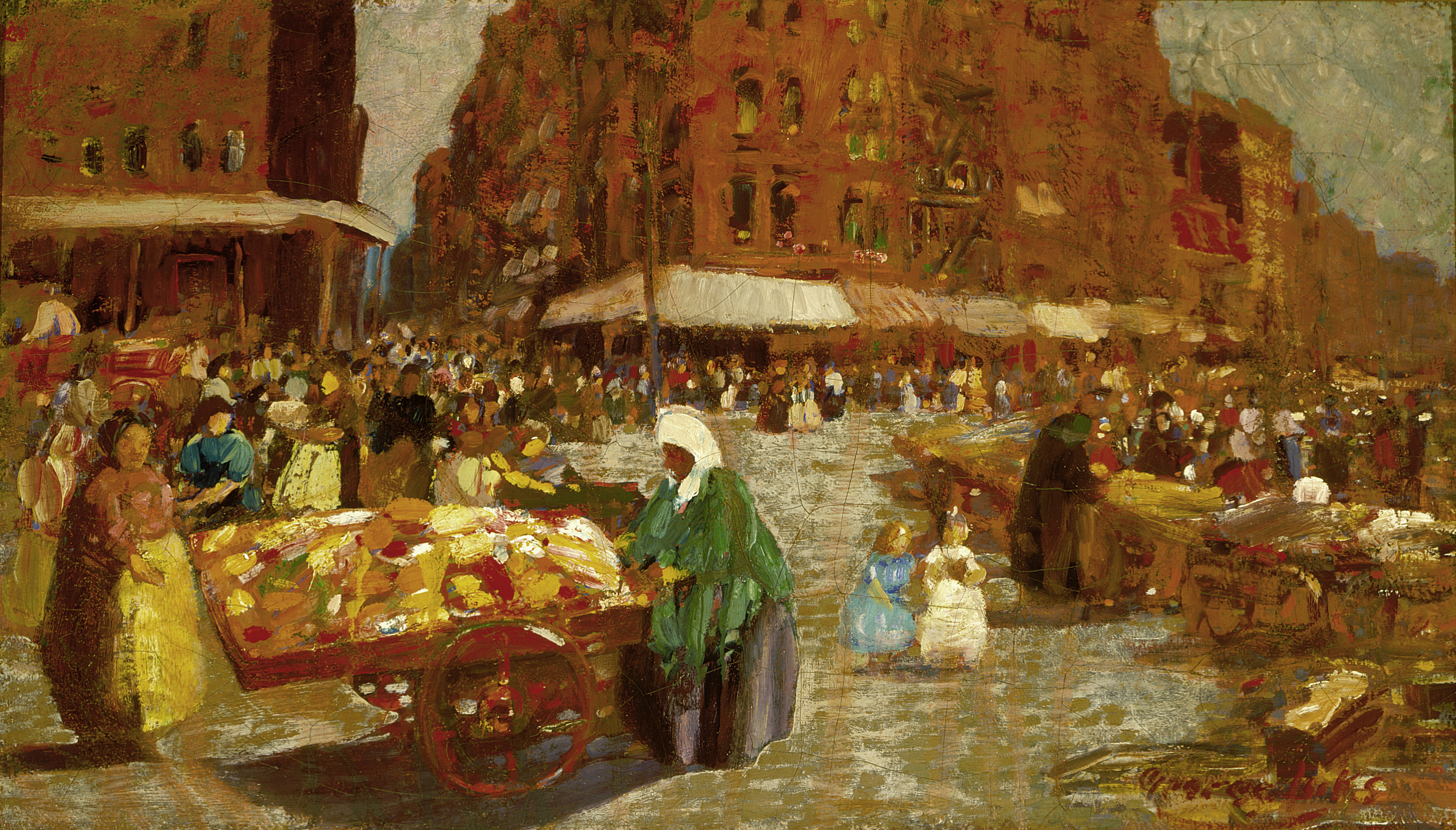
Houston Street (1917) by George Luks, Saint Louis Art Museum

At its east end, Houston Street meets FDR Drive in an interchange at East River Park. West of FDR Drive, it intersects with Avenue D. Further west, other streets, including First Avenue, the Bowery, Lafayette Street and Broadway, intersect Houston Street. The Broadway intersection is the division point between East Houston Street and West Houston Street. Sixth Avenue intersects Houston Street at a curve in the road in Greenwich Village. East of Sixth Avenue, Houston street is bidirectional and separated by a median; west of Sixth, the street is narrower and unidirectional westbound. West Houston Street terminates at an intersection with West Street near Pier 40 on the Hudson River.

== History ==
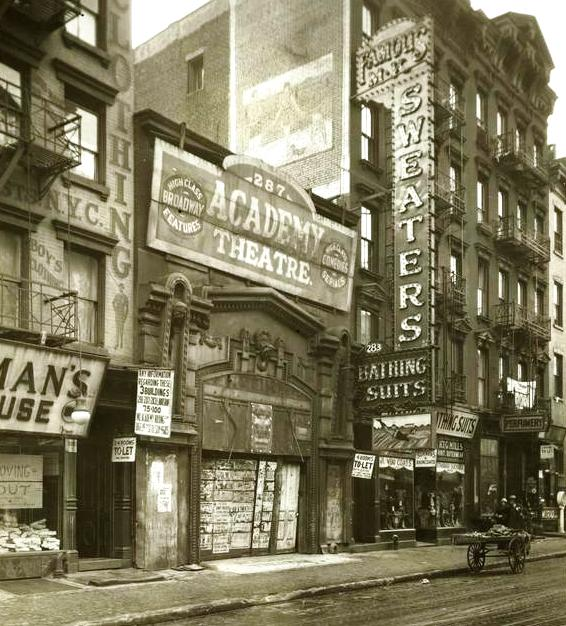
East Houston Street between Clinton and Suffolk Streets in the 1920s

Houston Street is named for William Houstoun, who was a delegate from the state of Georgia to the Continental Congress from 1784 through 1786 and to the Constitutional Convention in 1787. The street was christened by Nicholas Bayard (b. 1736), whose daughter, Mary, was married to Houstoun in 1788. The couple met while Houstoun, a member of an ancient and aristocratic Scottish family, was serving in the Congress. Bayard cut the street through a tract he owned in the vicinity of Canal Street in which he lived, and the city later extended it to include North Street, the northern border of New York's east side at the beginning of the 19th century.

The current spelling of the name is a corruption: the street appears as Houstoun in the city's Common Council minutes for 1808 and the official map drawn in 1811 to establish the street grid that is still current. In those years, the Texas hero Sam Houston, for whom the street is sometimes incorrectly said to have been named, was an unknown teenager in Tennessee. Also mistaken is the explanation that the name derives from the Dutch words huis for house and tuin for garden. The narrow, westernmost stretch of the current Houston Street, from Sixth Avenue to the West Side Highway, was known as "Hammersley Street" (also spelled "Hamersly Street") until the middle 19th century, and was inside Greenwich Village. It later came to be regarded as the Village's southern boundary.

In 1891, Nikola Tesla established his laboratory on Houston Street. Much of Tesla's research was lost in an 1895 fire.

The street, originally narrow, was markedly widened from Sixth Avenue to Essex Street in the early 1930s during construction of the Independent Subway System's Sixth Avenue Line. The street widening involved demolition of buildings on both sides of the street, resulting in numerous small, empty lots. Although some of these lots have been redeveloped, many of them are now used by vendors, and some have been turned into playgrounds and, more recently, community gardens.

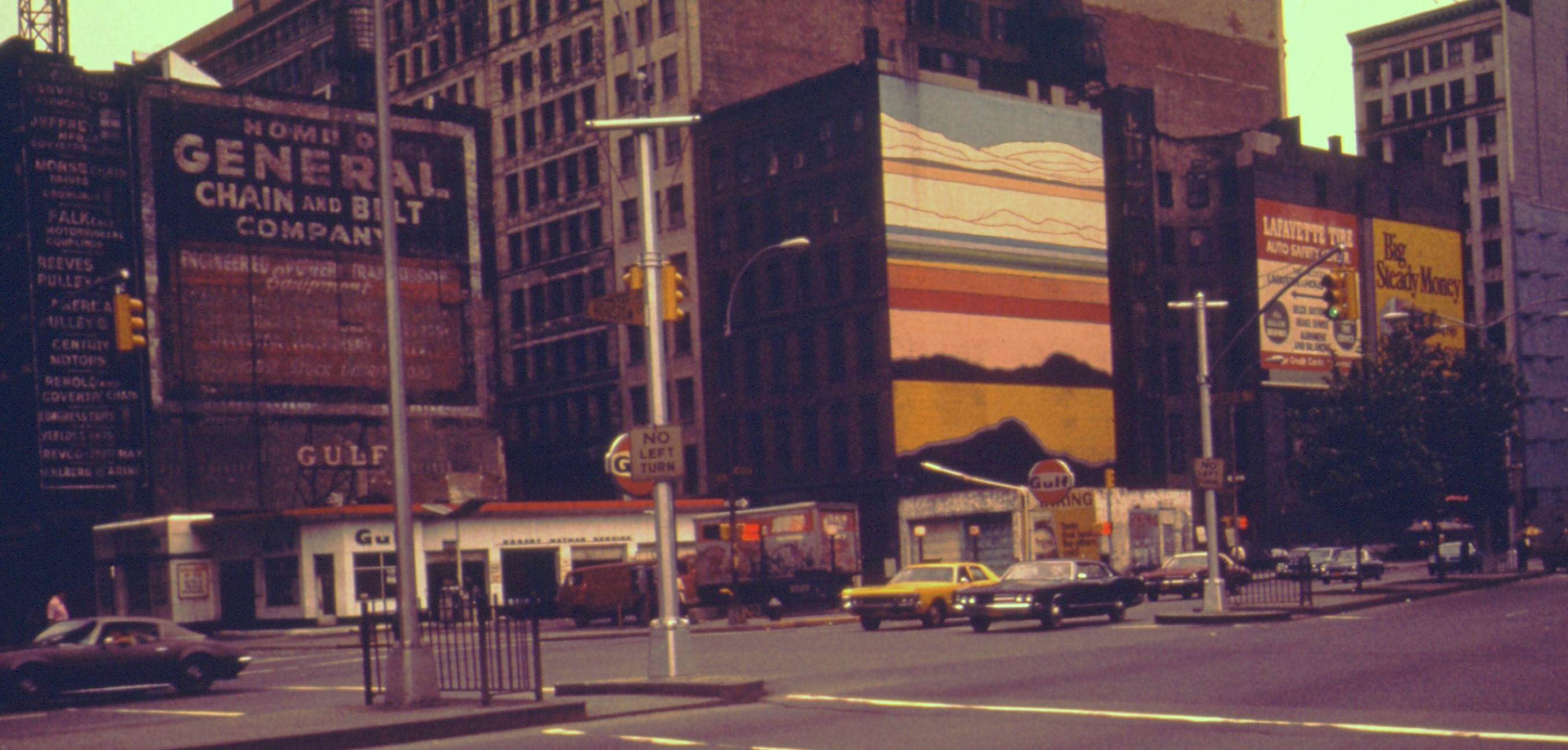
Houston Street at Lafayette Street in 1974

Lower Manhattan's SoHo district takes its name from an acronym for "South of Houston", as the street serves as SoHo's northern boundary; another, narrower neighborhood north of Houston Street is correspondingly called NoHo.

In 1971, Houston Street became the southernmost street in Manhattan to extend between both the Hudson and East Rivers, when the World Trade Center was constructed and deprived Fulton Street of that title. With the reconstruction of the World Trade Center, Fulton Street was extended past Church Street to West Street, but is closed off to vehicular traffic west of Church Street.

A reconstruction project rebuilt parts of the street between 2005 and 2018.

== Transportation ==
As of 2024, Houston Street is served by the M21 New York City Bus route from Columbia to Washington Streets westbound, and from 6th Avenue to the FDR Drive eastbound. The bus route itself had replaced an earlier streetcar line, which is now the M9 between Avenues A and C. Additional service is provided by the eastbound M14D SBS east of Avenue D and the downtown M15 from Second Avenue to Allen Street. The M15 SBS does not make any stops on Houston Street.

A portion of the New York City Subway's IND Sixth Avenue Line runs under Houston Street, between Sixth Avenue to just before Avenue A; there are stations at Second Avenue (F and <F> trains) and Broadway – Lafayette Street (B, D, F, <F>, and M trains). Additionally, there is a station at Seventh Avenue, for the Houston Street (1 and 2 trains). The Bleecker Street station (4, 6, and <6> trains) has station entrances on the north side of Houston Street, due to its connection with the Broadway – Lafayette Street station as part of a larger station complex.

Exit 5 on the FDR Drive is on Houston Street. The street also connects directly with the West Side Highway; however, by then, Houston Street is westbound-only.
