= Avenue D (Manhattan) =

Avenue in Manhattan, New York

- Abraham E. Kazan Street; Columbia Street
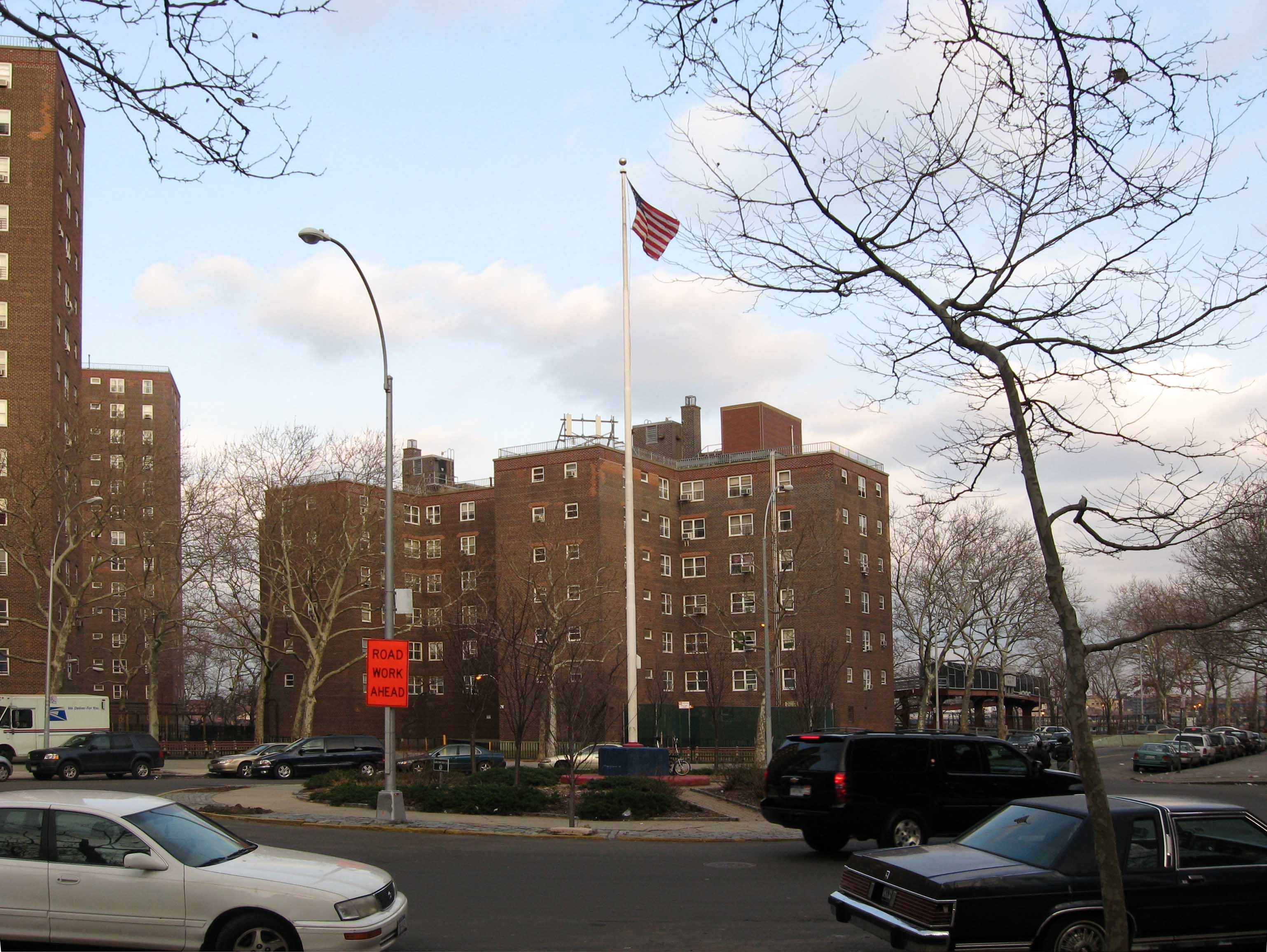
- The Jacob Riis Houses, located on Avenue D
- Owner: City of New York
- Maintained by: NYCDOT
- Length: 0.9 mi (1.4 km)
- Location: Manhattan, New York City
- ZIP Codes: 10002, 10009
- South end: Houston Street in Lower East Side
- North end: 13th Street in Alphabet City
- East: Franklin D. Roosevelt Drive
- West: Avenue C

Construction
- Commissioned: March 1811

Avenue D is the easternmost named avenue in the East Village neighborhood of Manhattan, New York City, east of Avenue C and west of the FDR Drive. It runs through East 13th and Houston Streets, and continues south of Houston Street as Columbia Street until petering out at Grand Street. Avenues A, B, C and D are the origin of the name of the section of the East Village neighborhood through which they run, Alphabet City.

== History ==
The street was created by the Commissioners' Plan of 1811, as one of 16 north–south streets specified as 100 feet (30 m) in width; they include 12 numbered avenues, and four (located east of First Avenue) designated by letter.

By March 1926, the segment of Avenue D between 14th and 15th Streets was identified as being "closed and discontinued" on the city map to accommodate future expansion of the East River Generating Station. After the events of September 11, 2001, the segment of Avenue D between 13th and 14th Streets was closed to traffic for security purposes due to the presence of the power plant.

In 1969, the segment of Columbia Street between Grand and Delancey Streets was named in honor of Abraham E. Kazan.

== Transportation ==
The M14D SBS is the primary server of the Avenue D/Columbia Street corridor, running south of East 10th Street either to Houston Street (southbound) or from Delancey Street (northbound); the latter is shared with the westbound M21 bus until Houston Street. Both routes serve the Baruch Houses.

== Structures ==
Among the structures along this avenue are:

- Dry Dock Park, located at the northern end (11th and Avenue D), a small park with a public pool—named for the neighborhood's former tradition of ship repair. The corner was formerly the site of the Corn Exchange Bank Trust Co.
- Many of the larger Public Housing projects in Alphabet City are on Avenue D. The east side of Avenue D is flanked by the Jacob Riis Houses (NYCHA housing), named for photographer Jacob Riis, who chronicled the plight of the city's poorest residents. The development was designed by Walker & Gillette and was completed in 1949. Other projects include Baruch Houses, LaGuardia Houses, and the Lillian Wald Houses, named for Lillian D. Wald (1867–1940), who provided aid to the Lower East Side through the Henry Street Settlement and the Visiting Nurses Society.
- Between 5th and 6th Streets, east of Avenue D, was formerly the location of the "Boys Brotherhood Republic", a self-governing youth project of the Henry Street Settlement.
