= M8 (New York City bus) =

Bus route in Manhattan, New York

m8
- Eighth and Ninth Streets Crosstown
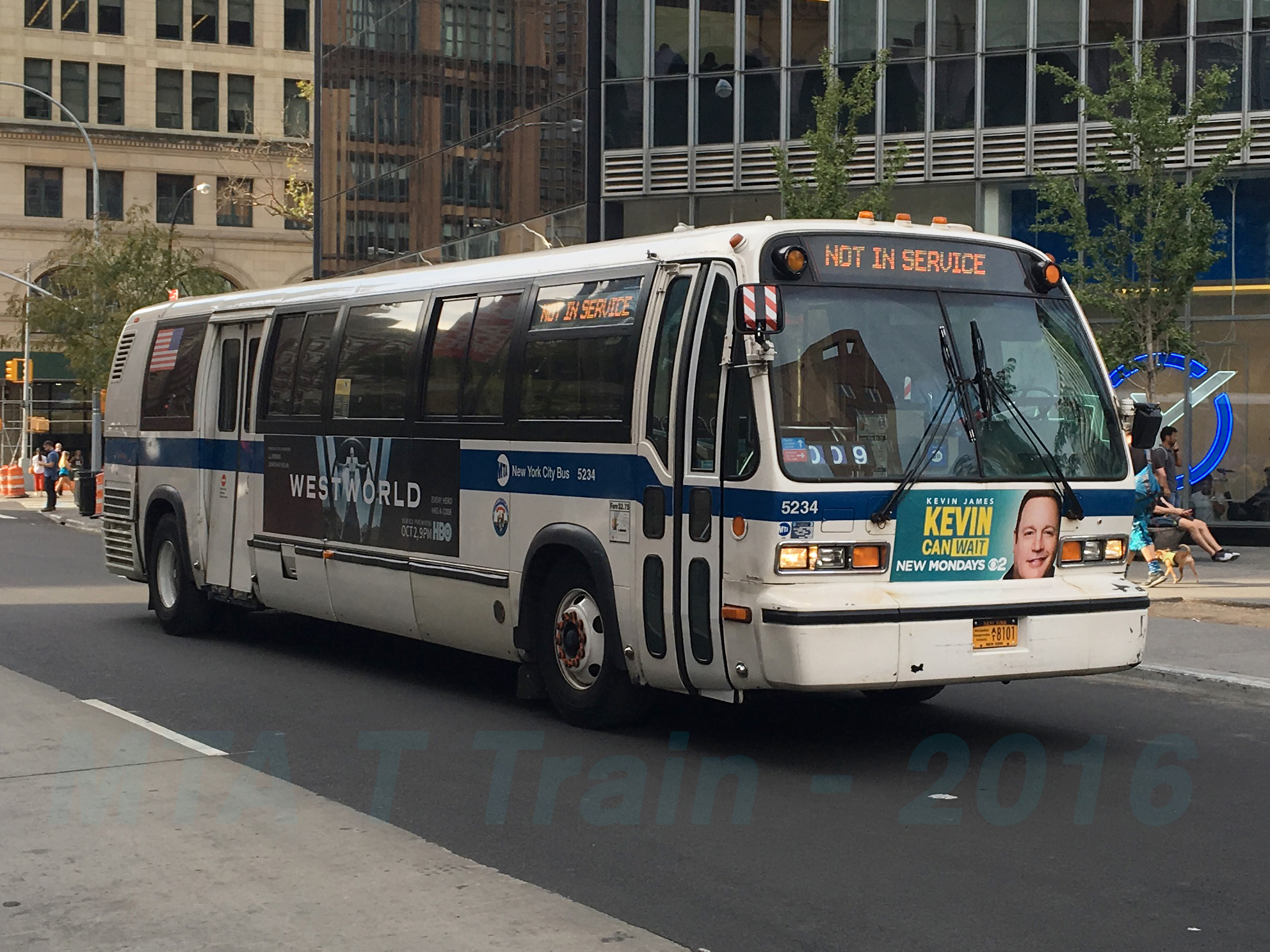
- A now-retired 1999 Nova Bus RTS-06 (5234) on the East Village-bound M8.

Overview
- System: MTA Regional Bus Operations
- Operator: Manhattan and Bronx Surface Transit Operating Authority
- Garage: Michael J. Quill Depot
- Vehicle: New Flyer Xcelsior XD40; New Flyer Xcelsior XE40; Nova Bus LFS HEV
- Began service: 1873 (train); 1936 (streetcar); 1962 (bus)

Route
- Locale: Manhattan, New York, U.S.
- Start: West Village - West Street and Christopher Street
- Via: Eighth Street (eastbound); Ninth Street (westbound)
- End: East Village - 10th Street and Avenue D
- Length: 2.3 miles (3.7 km) (eastbound)

Service
- Frequency: 5:00 AM – 1:00 AM
- Annual patronage: 325,171 (2025)
- Transfers: Yes (within 2 hours)
- Timetable: M8

The Eighth and Ninth Streets Crosstown is a public transit line in Manhattan, New York City, running mostly along Eighth Street, Ninth Street, Tenth Street, and Christopher Street through the West Village, Greenwich Village, and East Village. Originally a streetcar line, it is now the M8 bus route, operated by the Manhattan and Bronx Surface Transit Operating Authority.

== Route description ==
The M8 begins at the intersection of Christopher and West Streets, on the west side of Manhattan. From West Street to Greenwich Avenue, the bus runs west along Christopher Street and east along West 10th Street. At Greenwich Avenue, the bus runs west along West 9th Street and east along West 8th Street. These become East 9th and East 8th Streets, respectively, east of Fifth Avenue (east of Third Avenue, East 8th Street is known as St. Mark's Place). At Avenue A, both directions cross over to East 10th Street to avoid Tompkins Square Park. The route terminates on East 10th Street, just east of Avenue D.

== History ==
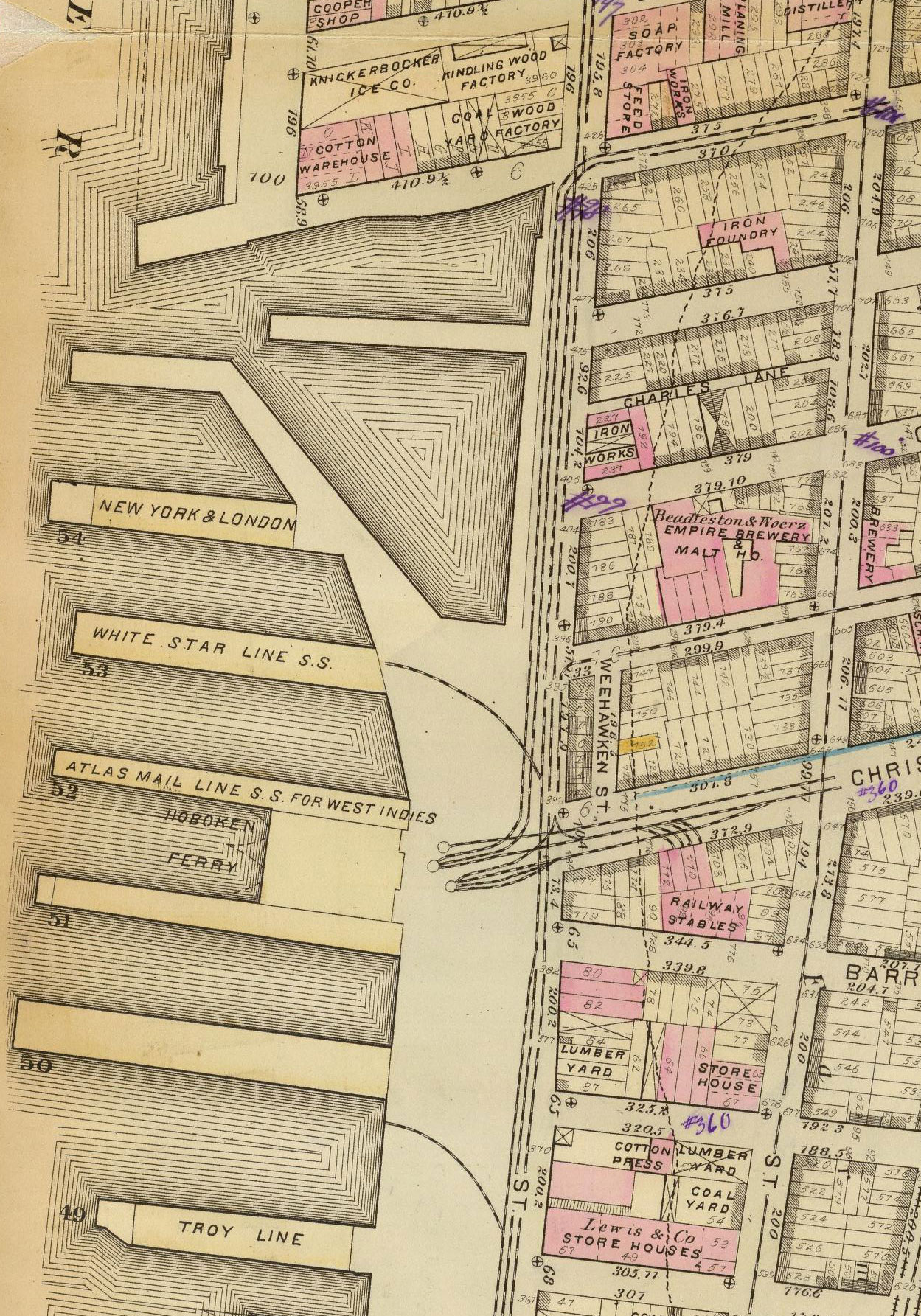
1879 map of the Christopher Street Ferry area, including the Eighth Street Crosstown Line, West Belt Line, and 17th and 18th Streets Crosstown Line

The Christopher and Tenth Street Railroad was chartered on April 25, 1873, and opened soon after (other sources give August 6, 1873, as the incorporation date). It traveled across the island between the Christopher Street Ferry on the Hudson River and the East Tenth Street Ferry on the East River. Tracks were built east from the Christopher Street Ferry dock to West Street, where it crossed the West Belt Line. Eastbound trains continued east on Christopher Street, while the westbound track curved north in West Street after crossing the West Belt Line and turned east on Tenth Street. The one-way pair continued to Greenwich Avenue, through which the Seventh Avenue Line ran; cars turned southeast on Greenwich Avenue and east on Eighth Street along the Seventh Avenue Line tracks. The Seventh Avenue Line turned south at Macdougal Street, while the Eighth Street Crosstown continued along Eighth Street to Cooper Square. There the westbound track split to the northeast on Astor Place/Stuyvesant Street to reach Ninth Street, and the tracks were separated in Eighth and Ninth Streets to Avenue A. Trains turned north in Avenue A for two blocks (eastbound) or one block (westbound), along Forty-Second Street and Grand Street Ferry Railroad trackage, to Tenth Street, and then turned east again for the rest of the line to the East River. The trackage in Tenth Street east of Avenue C had been built by the Houston, West Street and Pavonia Ferry Railroad.

On May 28, 1890, the Central Crosstown Railroad, which owned the 17th and 18th Streets Crosstown Line from the Christopher Street Ferry east-northeast to the East 23rd Street Ferry, leased the Christopher and Tenth Street Railroad. The growing Metropolitan Street Railway acquired a majority of stock of the Central Crosstown in May 1897, and leased the companies on April 1, 1904. Two months after the Williamsburg Bridge opened, on February 16, 1904, a second service pattern was added, taking some trains south on Avenue A and the one-way pair of Essex Street and Clinton Street (the latter via 1st Street) to reach Delancey Street and the Williamsburg Bridge, ending at a loop on the Brooklyn side. Due to the Metropolitan's bankruptcy, their lines over the bridge were replaced in 1911 by a single one, the Seventh Avenue-Brooklyn Line, which shared trackage with the Seventh Avenue Line from Central Park to Greenwich Village, turning east on the Eighth Street Crosstown Line and over the bridge to Brooklyn. That service was discontinued in 1919.

Buses were substituted for streetcars by the New York City Omnibus Corporation on March 3, 1936. That company changed its name to Fifth Avenue Coach Lines in 1956; the Manhattan and Bronx Surface Transit Operating Authority took over operations in 1962.

=== Budget cuts ===
Because of economic troubles facing the Metropolitan Transportation Authority (MTA) in 2008–2009, the M8 bus was proposed for elimination. However, after community protests, the proposal was withdrawn in May 2009. In June 2010, weekend and overnight service was eliminated. Weekend service was reinstated on April 6, 2014, as part of the MTA's 2013–14 Service Enhancements Program.
