= M21 (New York City bus) =

Bus route in Manhattan, New York

m21
- Houston Street Crosstown
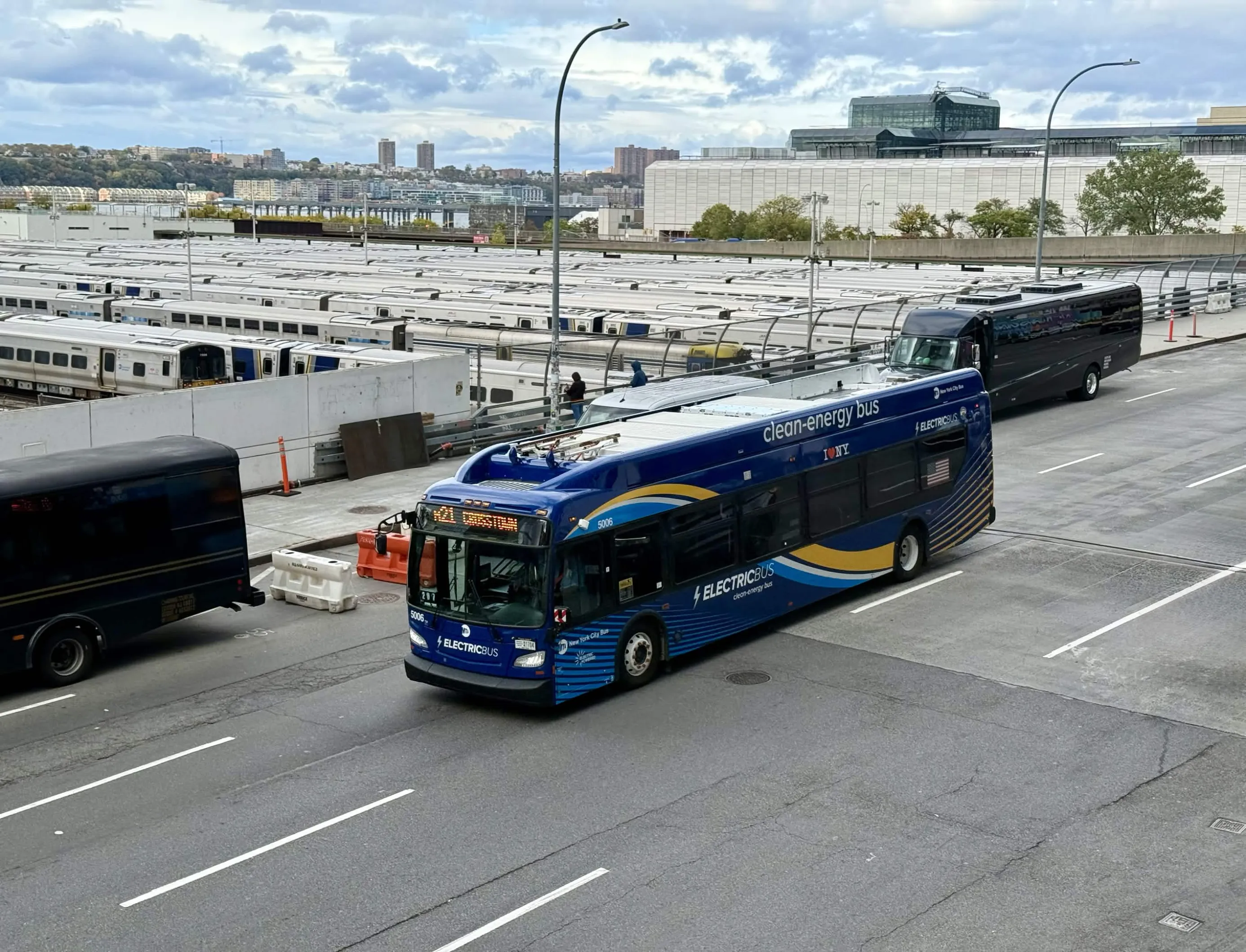
- A New Flyer XE40 (5006) on the M21 near the West Side Yard

Overview
- System: MTA Regional Bus Operations
- Operator: Manhattan and Bronx Surface Transit Operating Authority
- Garage: Michael J. Quill Depot
- Vehicle: New Flyer Xcelsior XD40; New Flyer Xcelsior XE40; Nova Bus LFS HEV

Route
- Locale: Manhattan, New York, U.S.
- Communities served: West Village, SoHo, Lower East Side
- Start: West Village – Spring St and Hudson St; West Village - 6th Avenue and Spring Street (PM rush hour)
- Via: Houston Street
- End: Lower East Side – Grand Street and FDR Drive
- Length: 2.5 miles (4.0 km)

Service
- Weekend frequency: Every 30 minutes
- Operates: 6:30 AM-11:50 PM
- Annual patronage: 350,723 (2025)
- Transfers: Yes
- Timetable: M21

The M21 bus route constitutes a public transit line in Manhattan, New York City. The M21 operates between the West Village and the Lower East Side, serving as a Houston Street crosstown. The M9 and M21 are operated by the Manhattan and Bronx Surface Transit Operating Authority, and based out of the Michael J. Quill Depot.

== Current route ==
The M21 bus route begins at Spring Street and Hudson Street in the West Village. Eastbound buses use Sixth Avenue to access Houston Street, whereas westbound buses use Washington Street to access the terminus. The M21 stays on Houston Street until Columbia Street. Eastbound buses continue to FDR Drive, and use the service road to access Grand Street, where they terminate. Westbound buses then use Lewis Street, Delancey Street, and Columbia Street to access Houston St, where they head back to the West Side. During the afternoon rush hour, M21 buses short turn at Sixth Avenue instead of terminating at Washington Street.

== History ==
=== Early history ===
The M21 was originally the New York City Department of Plant and Structures bus route M10, and later became New York City Omnibus Corporation's route 21. This route replaced New York Railways' Avenue C Line streetcar on September 21, 1919.

=== Recent history ===
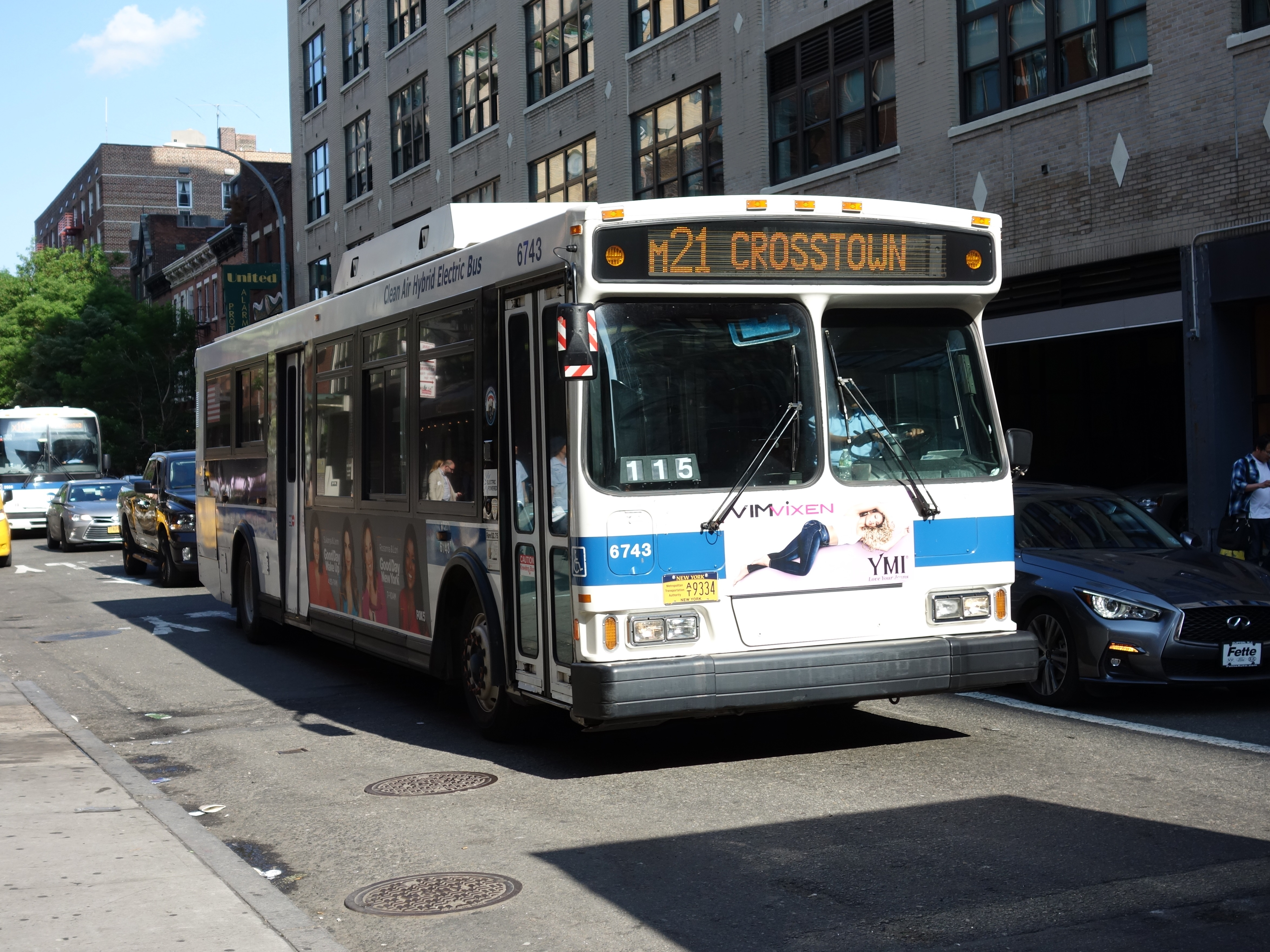
A 2006 Orion VII OG HEV (6743) on the M21 at Houston/Varick Streets in May 2018.

Due to the 2010 budget crisis, the M21 which ran to 29th Street via Avenue C and weekend service was discontinued on June 27, 2010, in conjunction with an extension to its current terminus at Grand Street and FDR Drive. Weekend service was restored on January 6, 2013. On January 3, 2022, the M21 had its western terminus during PM rush hours truncated to 6th Avenue due to rush hour traffic on Varick Street approaching the Holland Tunnel.
