= Cumbo (surname) =

Cumbo is a surname. Some Cumbo families in the United States are of free African-American ancestry, descending from Emanuel Cumbo.

Notable people with the surname include:

- Laurie Cumbo – American politician (born 1975)
- Marion Cumbo – American cellist
- Clarissa Burton Cumbo – American musician and arts patron (1903–1988)
- Edith Cumbo – American 18th-century free Black woman and entrepreneur
- Mary Cumbo – mother of Henry Berry Lowry
- Hugo Cumbo – Vanuatuan judoka
- Jorge Cumbo – Argentine musician (1942–2021)
- Saviour Cumbo - Maltese theologian
