= Dweck =

Dweck or Douek (Arabic: دويك, Hebrew: דוויק, דוויך, דואק) (Note: Other spellings in English include Dweck, Dwek, Doueck, Douak , Dueck, Duek, Dweik,Duwayk, Douec, Dueke, Douwek) is a Sephardic Jewish surname. It may mean "cockerel" or "long-necked earthenware jug" in Arabic. Many of its bearers belong to a Kohenitic family originating in Aleppo, Syria. It is suggested that it is a corruption of the ancient Jewish surname to better suit the Arabic culture into which the Jews assimilated. Notable people with the surname include:

== People ==
- Carol Dweck, American psychologist
- Claudia Roden (née Douek), British cookbook writer
- Ellis Douek, British surgeon
- Ephraim Dowek, Israeli diplomat
- Esther Dweck, Brazilian economist
- Haim Moussa Douek, Egyptian rabbi
- Ḥayyim Saul Duwayk, Syrian rabbi
- Joel Douek, British composer
- Joseph Dweck, American-British rabbi
- Michael Dweck, American visual artist and filmmaker
- Moshe Dwek, Israeli politician
- Ronny Douek Israeli businessman ans social entrepreneur
- Solomon Dwek, Israeli-American real estate investor and FBI informant
- Stephan Dweck, American radio show host
