= Frederick Douglass Houses =

Public housing development in Manhattan, New York

- NYCHA property
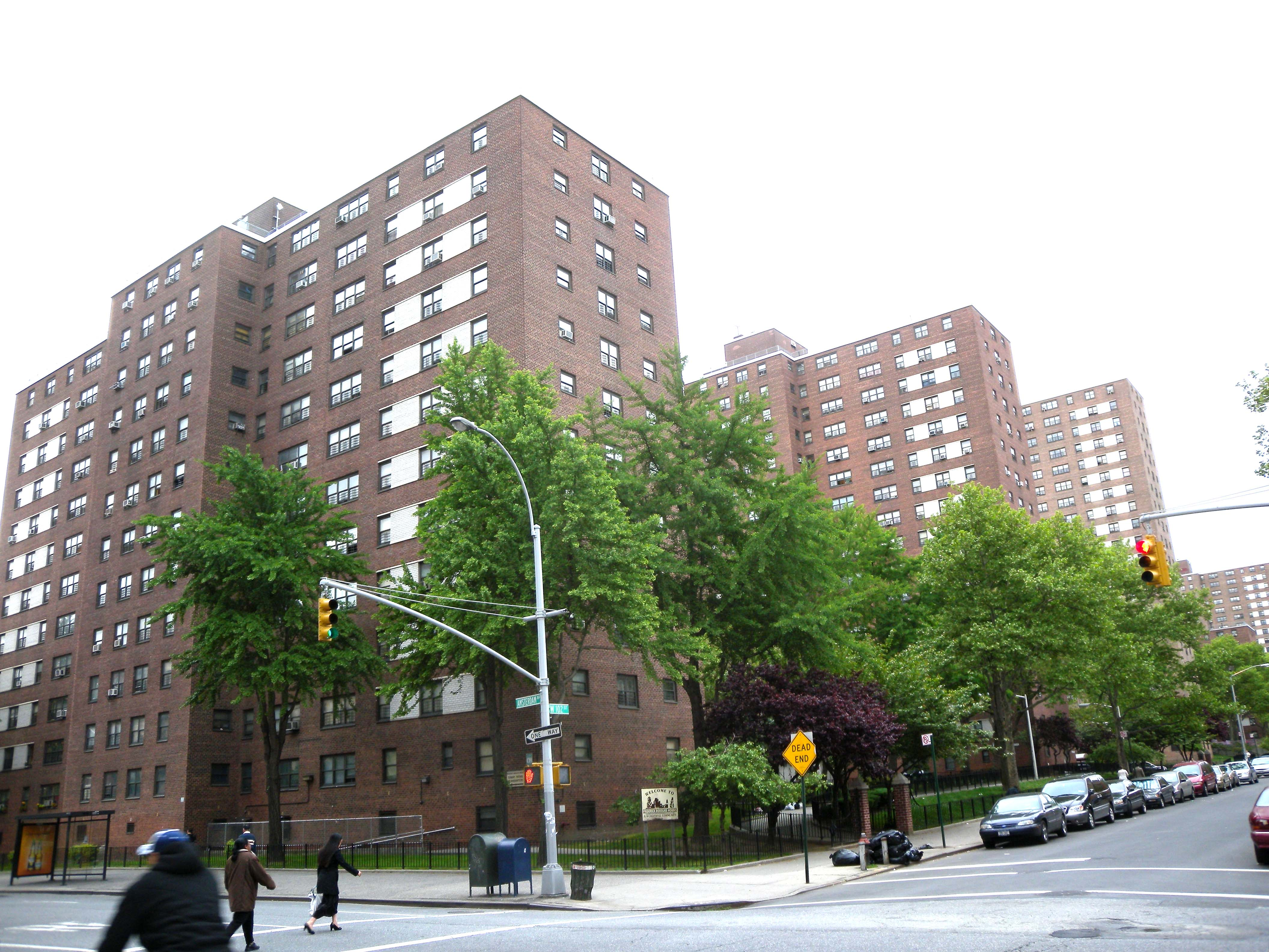
- Interactive map of Frederick Douglass Houses
- Coordinates: 40.797570°N 73.964660°W
- Country: United States
- State: New York
- City: New York City
- Borough: Manhattan

Area
  - Total: 0.019 sq mi (0.049 km^{2})

Population
  - Total: 2,672
  - Density: 140,000/sq mi (54,000/km^{2})
- ZIP codes: 10025
- Area codes: 212, 332, 646, and 917
- Website: my.nycha.info/DevPortal/

The Frederick Douglass Houses are a public housing project located in the New York City borough of Manhattan, in the Manhattan Valley neighborhood of Upper West Side, named for abolitionist and civil rights pioneer Frederick Douglass. The actual buildings are located between 100th Street and 104th Street, to the east of Amsterdam Avenue and the west of Manhattan Avenue. The complex is owned and operated by the New York City Housing Authority.

== Development ==
The development was approved by the New York City Planning Commission on February 7, 1952, as a low-rent housing project to be erected on a 22.5-acre (91,000 m^{2}) site, a "superblock" bounded by Manhattan Avenue, Amsterdam Avenue and West 100th and 104th Streets. The original portion of the complex consists of 17 buildings – 5, 9, 12, 17, 18, and 20 stories tall – completed on May 31, 1958, on a 21.76-acre (8.81 ha) site. The development includes 2,056 apartments housing some 4,588 residents. The Frederick Douglass Addition, completed on June 30, 1965, is a 16-story building with 306 residents on .55-acre (0.22 ha) on Amsterdam Avenue between West 102nd and West 103rd Streets.

The Frederick Douglass Playground covers 1.945 acres (7,870 m^{2}), on Amsterdam Avenue between 100th and 102nd Streets. Land for the playground was acquired by the city in 1954, and the playground was opened on September 10, 1958. The New York City Board of Estimate transferred the property from the New York City Housing Authority to the New York City Department of Parks and Recreation in August 1962, which still is responsible for management of the park.

In 2012, the Frederick Douglass Houses farm was launched through a partnership between NYCHA and Project EATS on the former site of the tennis courts.

The flagship of Hostelling International USA in the United States is on the Frederick Douglass Houses superblock, in a landmark building designed by noted architect Richard Morris Hunt in the 19th century. This popular hostel occupies the entire east blockfront of Amsterdam Avenue between 103rd and 104th Streets.

== Notable residents ==
- David Freeman Wooley (Born 1960), director, producer, author and entrepreneur
- Reggie Carter (1957– 1999), NBA Player, New York Knicks
- Stephan Dweck (Born 1960), humorist and entertainment attorney
- Lawrence Hilton-Jacobs (born 1953), actor
- Monteria Ivey (1960–2001), host of PBS game show Think Twice
- Kelis (born 1979), soul singer
- Mekhi Phifer (born 1974), actor

== See also ==
- New York City Housing Authority
- List of New York City Housing Authority properties
