= Clarissa Burton Cumbo =

American musician and arts patron (1903–1988)

- Born: January 15, 1903; Roseau, Dominica, British West Indies
- Died: August 20, 1988 (aged 85); New York City
- Occupations: Arts patron and promoter
- Spouse: Marion Cumbo

Clarissa Wilhelmina Burton Cumbo (January 15, 1903 – August 20, 1988) was an American musician and arts patron, based in New York and born in the British West Indies.

== Early life ==
Clarissa Wilhelmina Burton was born in Roseau, Dominica, the daughter of English-born Davies Charles Burton (1855–1919) and Jane Elizabeth Pinard Burton (1872–1948). Her father was a cathedral organist and choir director. She moved to New York as a girl, with her family.

== Career ==
Clarissa Cumbo was trained as a pianist and singer. She toured with Josephine Baker in The Chocolate Dandies revue in the 1920s. In 1942, she and her husband joined a committee of "prominent citizens" of Harlem, along with Countee Cullen, Shelton Hale Bishop, and Leathe Colvert Hemachandra, to judge a competition for young singers.

In the 1940s, Cumbo helped to organize the State Orchestra, an interracial ensemble, and the Cosmopolitan Little Symphony, which performed under Everett Lee. She founded Community Friends of Music in 1950, to promote concerts by Black musicians. In the 1960s she co-organized the charity Friends of the Symphony of the New World; her husband played cello in the symphony they supported. In 1970 she and her husband founded a nonprofit organization, Triad Presentations, nurturing and supporting the work of Black composers and musicians. Triad Presentations held an annual concert at Alice Tully Hall.

Clarissa Cumbo received the Howard Jackman Memorial Award from the National Association of Negro Musicians in 1979, "in recognition of her many years of service to composers and musicians." In 1985, the Cumbos were honored by the Harlem School of the Arts for their contributions to classical arts education.

== Personal life ==
In 1924, Clarissa Burton married cellist Marion William Cumbo (1899–1990). They had a son, William Burton Cumbo (1926–1963), who served in the US Navy during World War II. She became an American citizen in 1943. She died in 1988, in New York, aged 85 years.
