= 53rd Street Line =

53rd Street Line may refer to:

- IND 53rd Street Line, an underground line of the New York City Subway in Manhattan and Queens
- 53rd Street Crosstown Line, a former surface transit line in Manhattan, New York City
