= Jim Boyd (newscaster) =

American television news anchor and actor (1942–2026)

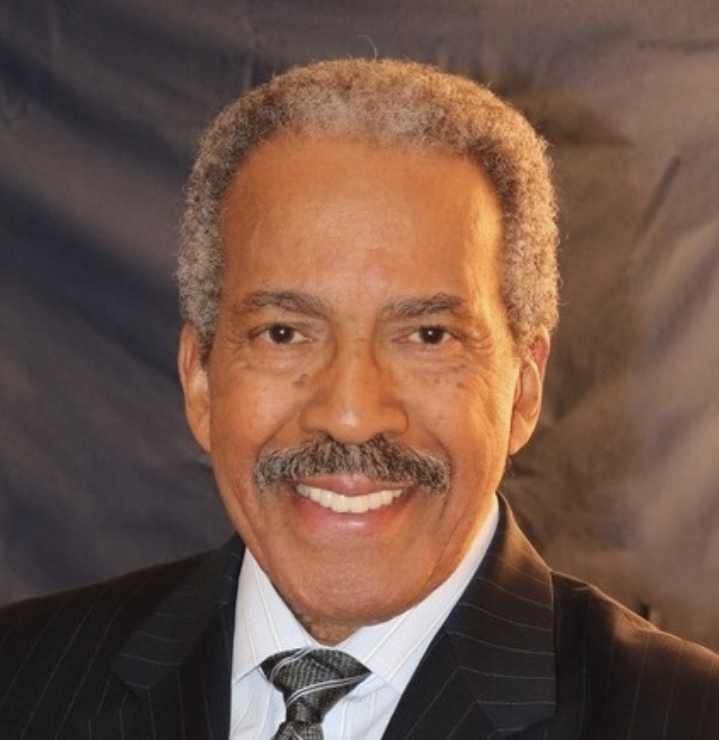
- Born: James Lloyd Boyd; March 26, 1942; New York City, U.S.
- Died: October 27, 2026 (aged 84)
- Occupations: Actor, television news anchor, reporter, journalist
- Years active: 1961–2026
- Spouse: Linda Polach (m. 1984)
- Children: 3

James Lloyd Boyd (March 26, 1942 – October 27, 2026) was an American actor and television news anchor and reporter for WCVB-TV.

== Early life and education ==
Boyd was born in Harlem, New York, on March 26, 1942, he was the son of Edmonia Coleman, a secretary and receptionist and Leroy Homer Boyd, a postal worker, gospel singer and musician. His grandfather Arthur Leroy Boyd was first violinist in the Negro String Quartet, which performed with singer Roland Hayes at New York's Carnegie Hall on November 27, 1925. Boyd had three siblings. He was born in Harlem Hospital, educated in New York City Schools Public School 90, and Public School 68, Humboldt Junior High School 115 and George Washington High School (class of 1958) and attended Long Island University in Brooklyn, New York, and Fairleigh Dickinson University in Teaneck, New Jersey.

== Career ==
Boyd started his broadcasting career at National Educational Television in New York in 1961, beginning as a mail clerk, then production assistant, associate producer and eventually producer for News in Perspective, a bi-weekly news analysis and background program produced in association with The New York Times and hosted by Lester Markel and Clifton Daniel. The program was generally produced in New York City and Washington, DC, but often was produced around the world including Osaka, Japan; Saigon, South Vietnam; Cairo, Egypt; Bonn, Germany; or Paris, France. Boyd began an on-air career in Boston, Massachusetts in 1970, as a general assignment reporter at WHDH-TV (now WCVB-TV). He co-anchored weekend newscasts from 1976 to 1984, early mornings from 1984 to 2000, and noon newscasts from 1984 to 2006, when he was named special correspondent and field reporter for both WCVB's broadcast news operation and its website TheBostonChannel.com (now WCVB.com). He retired at the end of 2008. In 2009, Boyd enrolled as an undergraduate at the University of Massachusetts Boston, transferred to Tufts University in Medford, Massachusetts, and graduated with a Bachelor of Arts degree in sociology in 2013. Throughout his television career, Boyd was a member of AFTRA, which merged with the Screen Actors Guild in 2012 to become SAG-AFTRA. In 2013, after graduating from Tufts, Boyd began acting in television series and motion pictures as an extra or background performer. Projects he appeared on include American Hustle, The Equalizer, The Judge, The Forger, Olive Kitteridge, Unfinished Business, Black Mass, Ted 2, and Spotlight.

== Charitable and community work ==
Boyd did volunteer work with or served on the boards of the YMCA in Roxbury, Massachusetts; Youth Enrichment Services (YES) in Boston; The Arthritis Foundation in Boston; and The Massachusetts Chapter of the Huntington's Disease Society of America. He participated in the SAG-AFTRA Foundation Book Pals program and was a volunteer parent/coach in the Needham Track Club, the Needham Soccer Club, St. Joseph's Parish Youth Basketball program in Needham, Massachusetts, and the Bay State Jaguars AAU Basketball program in Newton, Massachusetts.

== Death ==
Boyd died on October 27, 2026, at the age of 84.

== Awards ==
Boyd received a Golden Circle award from the National Academy of Television Arts and Sciences New England chapter in 2011, and was inducted into the Massachusetts Broadcasters Hall of Fame in 2012.
