= M7 (New York City bus) =

Bus route in Manhattan, New York

m7
- Columbus / Amsterdam / Sixth / Seventh / Lenox Avenues Line
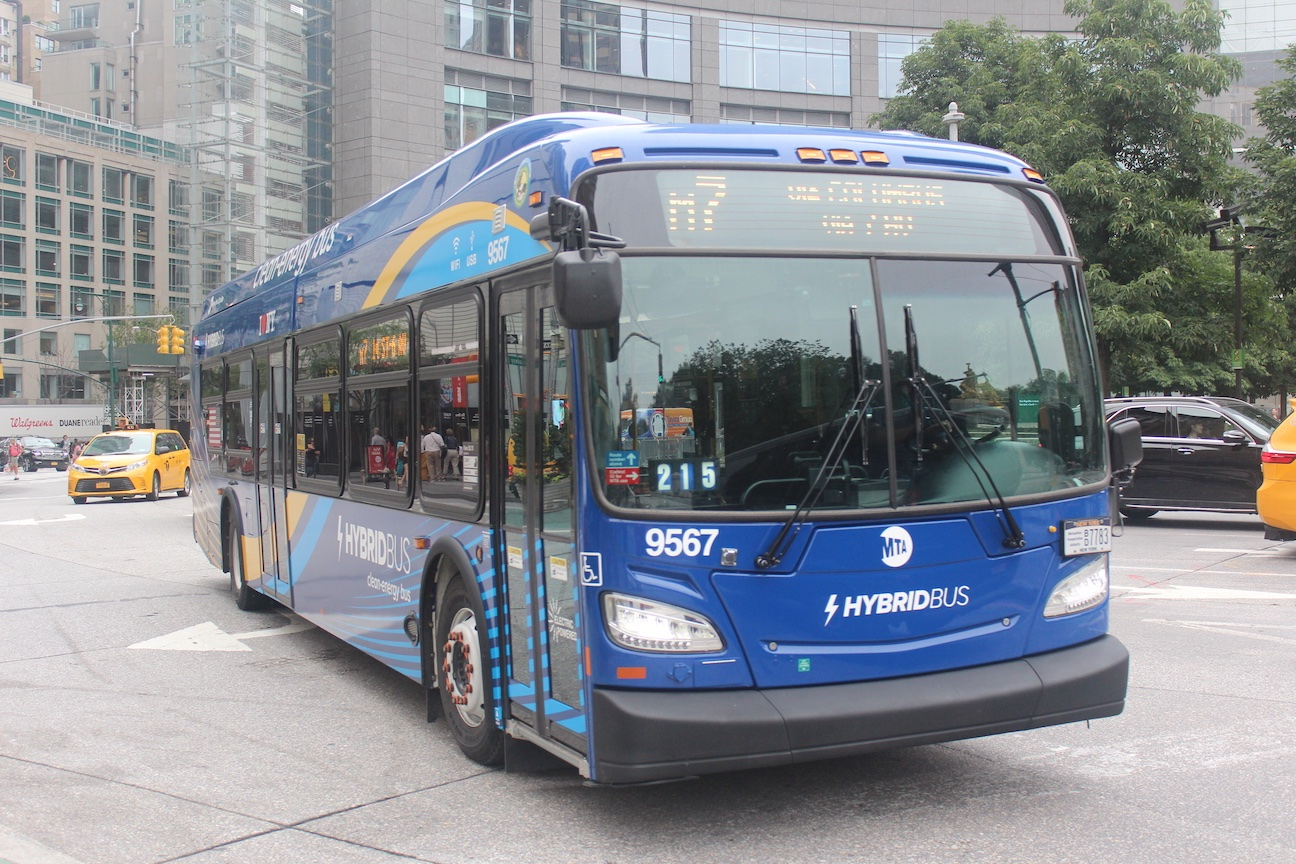
- A 2021 XDE40 (9567) on the 14th St/6th Ave-bound M7

Overview
- System: MTA Regional Bus Operations
- Operator: Manhattan and Bronx Surface Transit Operating Authority
- Garage: Mother Clara Hale Depot
- Vehicle: New Flyer Xcelsior XDE40
- Began service: 1892 (train); 1936 (streetcar); 1962 (bus); 2009–2010 (current alignment)

Route
- Locale: Manhattan, New York, U.S.
- Start: 14th Street / 6th Avenue
- Via: Sixth Avenue (northbound); Seventh Avenue (southbound); Amsterdam Avenue (northbound); Columbus Avenue (southbound); Lenox Avenue
- End: Harlem – 147th Street
- Length: 7.6 miles (12.2 km) (southbound)
- Other routes: M11 9th (Columbus)/10th (Amsterdam) Avs; M102 3rd/Lexington/Lenox Avs

Service
- Operates: 24 hours
- Annual patronage: 2,713,823 (2025)
- Transfers: Yes (within 2 hours)
- Timetable: M7

The M7 is a public transit line in Manhattan, New York City, running mostly along Columbus Avenue, 116th Street, and Lenox Avenue from Lower Manhattan to Harlem. The route was originally the Columbus Avenue Line streetcar, and is now a bus route operated by the New York City Transit Authority under the MaBSTOA subsidiary.

== Route description ==
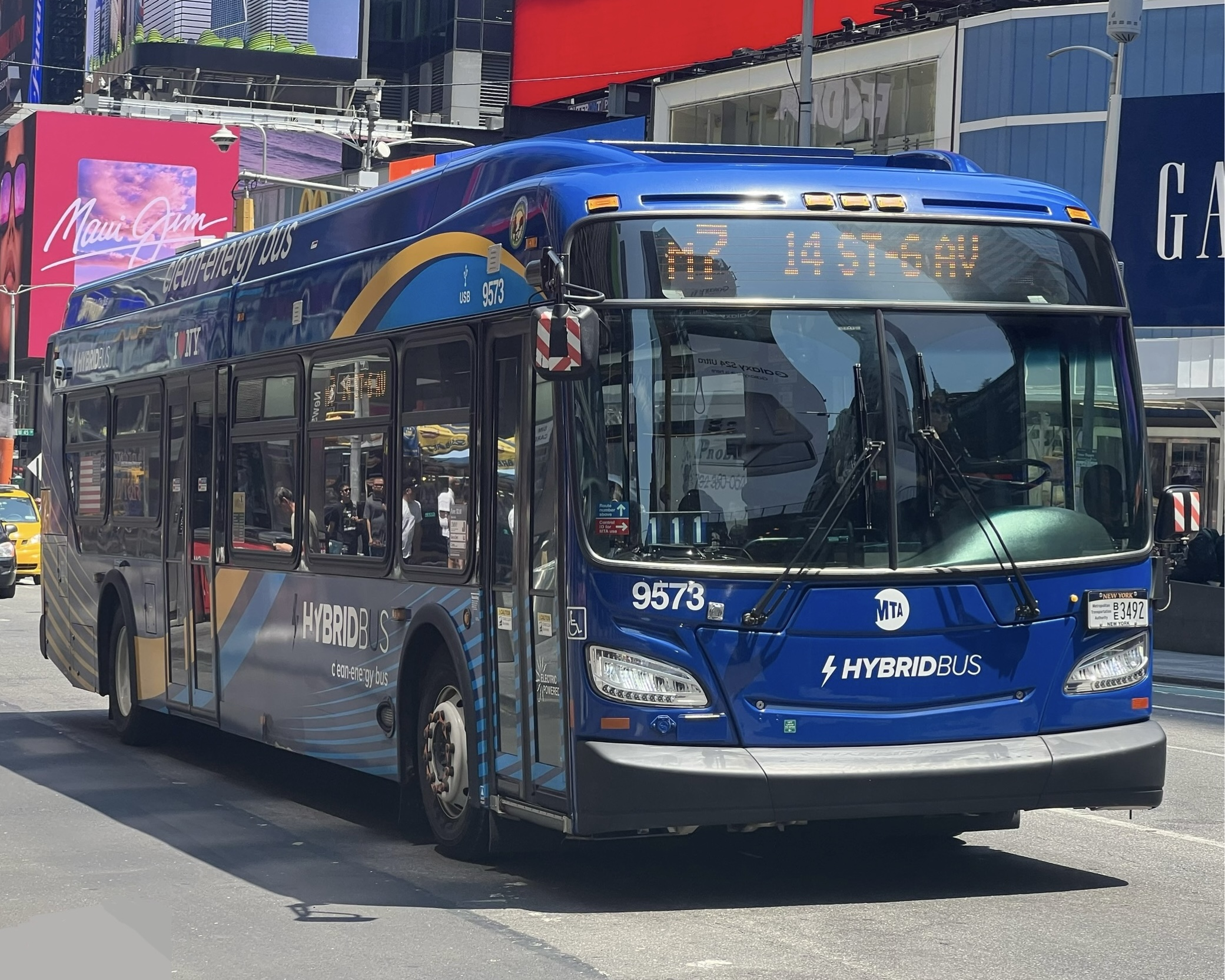
A 2021 XDE40 (9573) on the 14th St-6th Ave bound M7 at West 45th Street/7th Avenue in June 2024

The M7 route begins at the intersection of Sixth Avenue and 14th Street. Northbound it shares Sixth Avenue with the M55 between 14th Street and 44th Street, as well as the M5 above 31st Street. Southbound it shares Seventh Avenue with the M20. The M7 turns west at 59th Street and northwest on Broadway to reach the one-way pair of Amsterdam Avenue (northbound) and Columbus Avenue (southbound). These two streets are shared with the M11. The M7 turns east at 106th Street, north on Manhattan Avenue, east on 116th Street, and north on Lenox Avenue to a loop at the 145th Street subway station. This is the exact path followed by the former streetcar north of 109th Street.

Prior to 2009, southbound M7 service ran along Broadway and terminated at Union Square along 14th Street. This was changed due to pedestrianization of Broadway at Times Square, Duffy Square, and Herald Square, which closed the street to traffic. The southbound M7 now turns left at 14th Street and terminates at Sixth Avenue and 14th Street.

== History ==
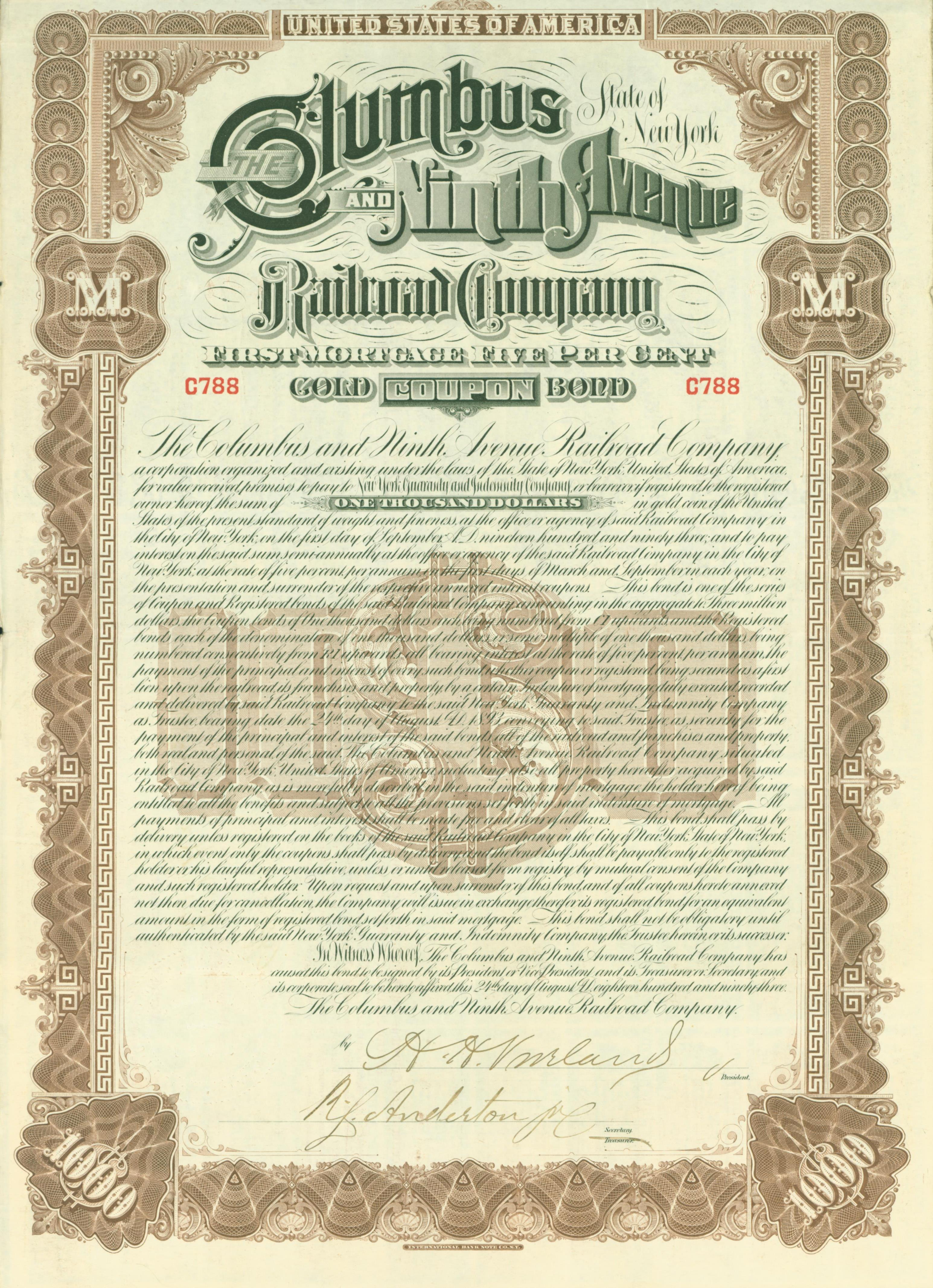
Gold Bond of the Columbus and Ninth Avenue Railroad Company, issued 24. August 1893

The Ninth Avenue Railroad's Ninth Avenue Line used the southernmost part of Columbus Avenue, but cut over along Broadway to use Amsterdam Avenue to Harlem. On December 30, 1892, the Columbus and Ninth Avenue Railroad acquired a franchise from the city to build along Columbus Avenue from Broadway to 110th Street, with a branch west on 106th Street to Amsterdam Avenue. It was soon authorized to build in 109th Street and Manhattan Avenue to 116th Street. The company was consolidated into the Metropolitan Street Railway on November 7, 1895.

Columbus Avenue cars were operated by the Metropolitan along their Broadway Line from lower Manhattan to Midtown, and then along the 53rd Street Crosstown Line (later the 59th Street Crosstown Line) west to 9th Avenue/Columbus Avenue. Cable cars were used from the line's opening on December 6, 1894 until May 1901. After the Metropolitan system was split in 1913, and the Third Avenue Railway acquired the 59th Street Crosstown, 53rd Street was again used.

Buses were substituted for streetcars by the New York City Omnibus Corporation on March 25, 1936. In 1956 it was renamed Fifth Avenue Coach Lines, and the Manhattan and Bronx Surface Transit Operating Authority replaced it in 1962. When Columbus and Amsterdam Avenues became one-way streets, northbound buses were moved to Amsterdam Avenue.

The pedestrianization of Broadway in Times Square and Herald Square in 2009 led southbound buses to be rerouted onto Seventh Avenue instead of Broadway between 59th Street and 14th Street. Consequently, the 14th Street terminus was shifted to Sixth Avenue.

On November 28, 2018, the route's southern terminal was moved to 18th Street and Sixth Avenue. Southbound buses began to run on 16th Street to reach the terminal. As of 2020, the M7 has been restored to 14th Street and Sixth Avenue.

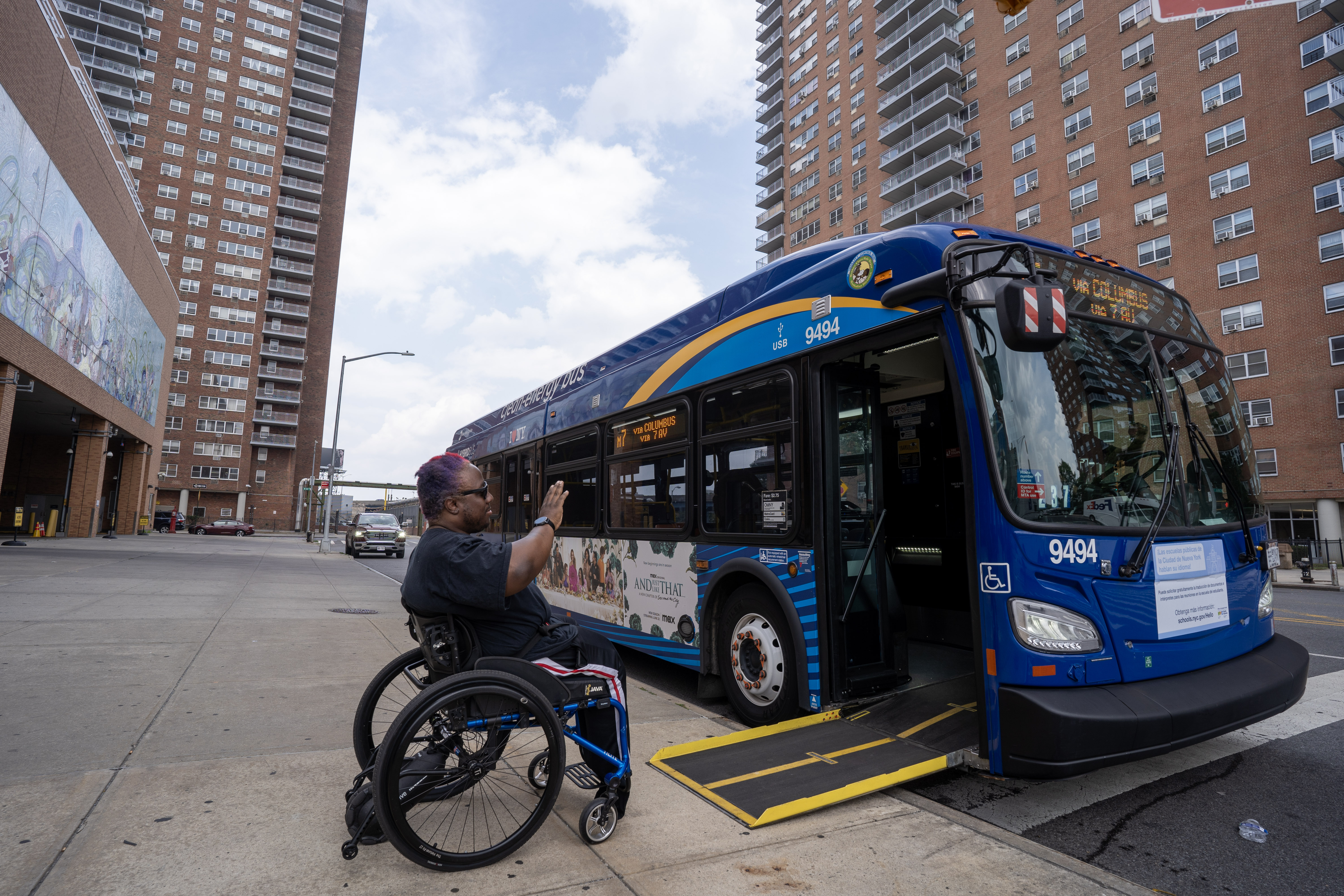
A 2021-22 XDE40 (9494) testing its then-new Quantum Securement for mobility passengers outside Mother Clara Hale Depot

On July 24, 2023, the MTA began a 6-month pilot program where mobility passengers can use an automatic securing device on select M7 buses. Named the Quantum Self Securement Station, these passengers can lock themselves in place without aid from a bus driver, which improves travel time.
