= George Caruana =

Maltese philosopher

- Born: 1831; Victoria, Gozo
- Died: 27 May 1872 (aged 40–41); Malta
- Occupation: Philosophy

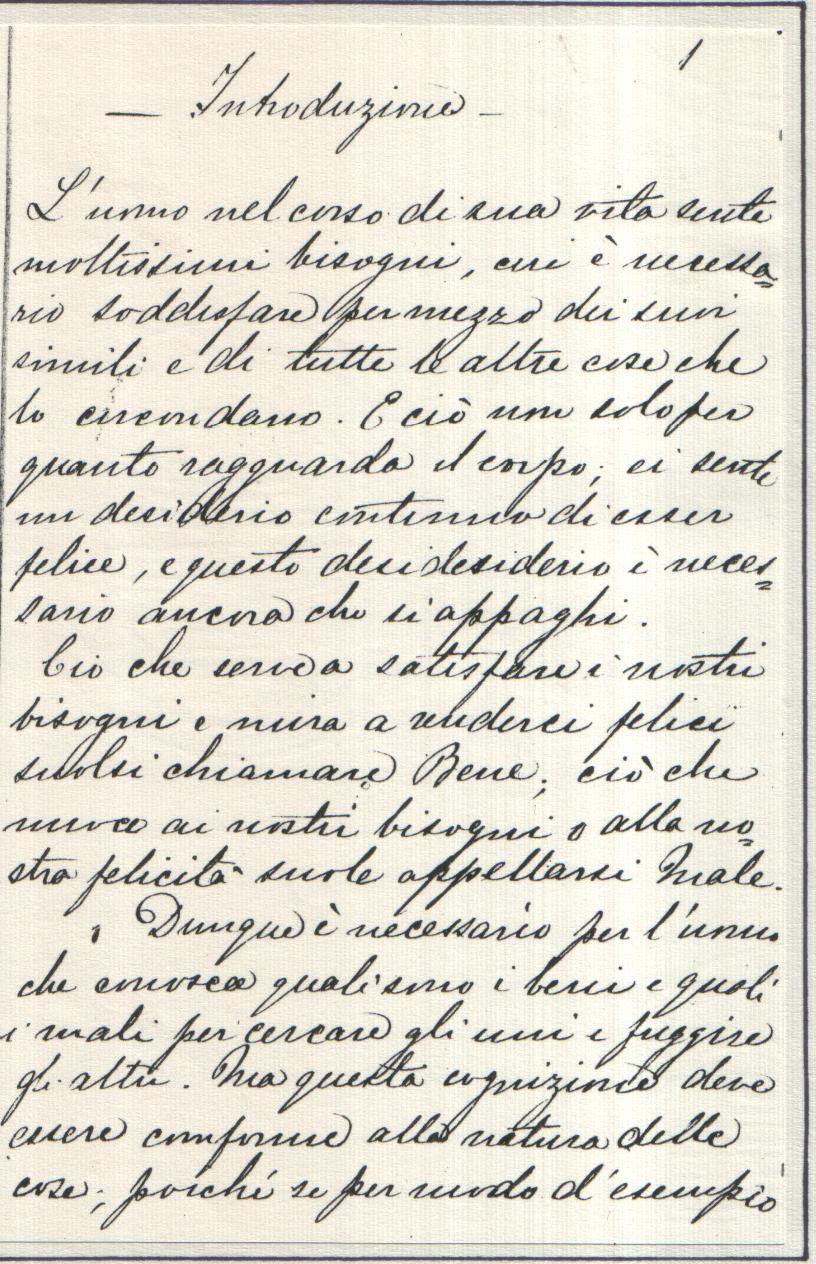
Filosofia (1869) by George Caruana

George Caruana (1831–1872) was a Maltese minor philosopher mostly interested in epistemology. He held the Chair of Philosophy at the University of Malta (1859–72).

== Life ==
Caruana was a diocesan priest. He was born in Victoria, Gozo in 1831, and dedicated his relatively short life to academic work. He studied at the bishop’s seminary in Gozo, and then at the Gregorian University in Rome, Italy, from where he graduated as Doctor of Ecclesiastical Studies. Back in the Maltese islands, in 1858 Caruana was appointed Rector at the bishop’s seminary of Malta. Here he taught philosophy and mathematics. A few months later, in 1859, he was appointed Professor of the Chair of Philosophy at the University of Malta. His teaching compliments here were various: intellectual philosophy, moral philosophy, and metaphysics. During the same time, he was also member of the Committee of the National Library of Malta. Caruana occupied the Chair of Philosophy for thirteen years, until his premature death. He died on 27 May 1872. His funeral oration was delivered by fellow-philosopher Saviour Cumbo.

== Extant work ==
Only one work of Caruana is as yet known to exist. It is simply called Filosofia (Philosophy). The work is still in manuscript form. It is written in Italian, and contains 184 folios in Caruana’s own handwriting. The document is divided into an introduction, chapters, and paragraphs.

Caruana deals with a number of themes, namely, knowledge, truth, nature, conscience, sensibility, imagination, intellect, intuition, judgement, discourse, memory, words, and such like subjects. All are discussed in a philosophically clear and argumentative way.

== See also ==
- Philosophy in Malta
