= Felix Weir =

American violinist (1884–1978)

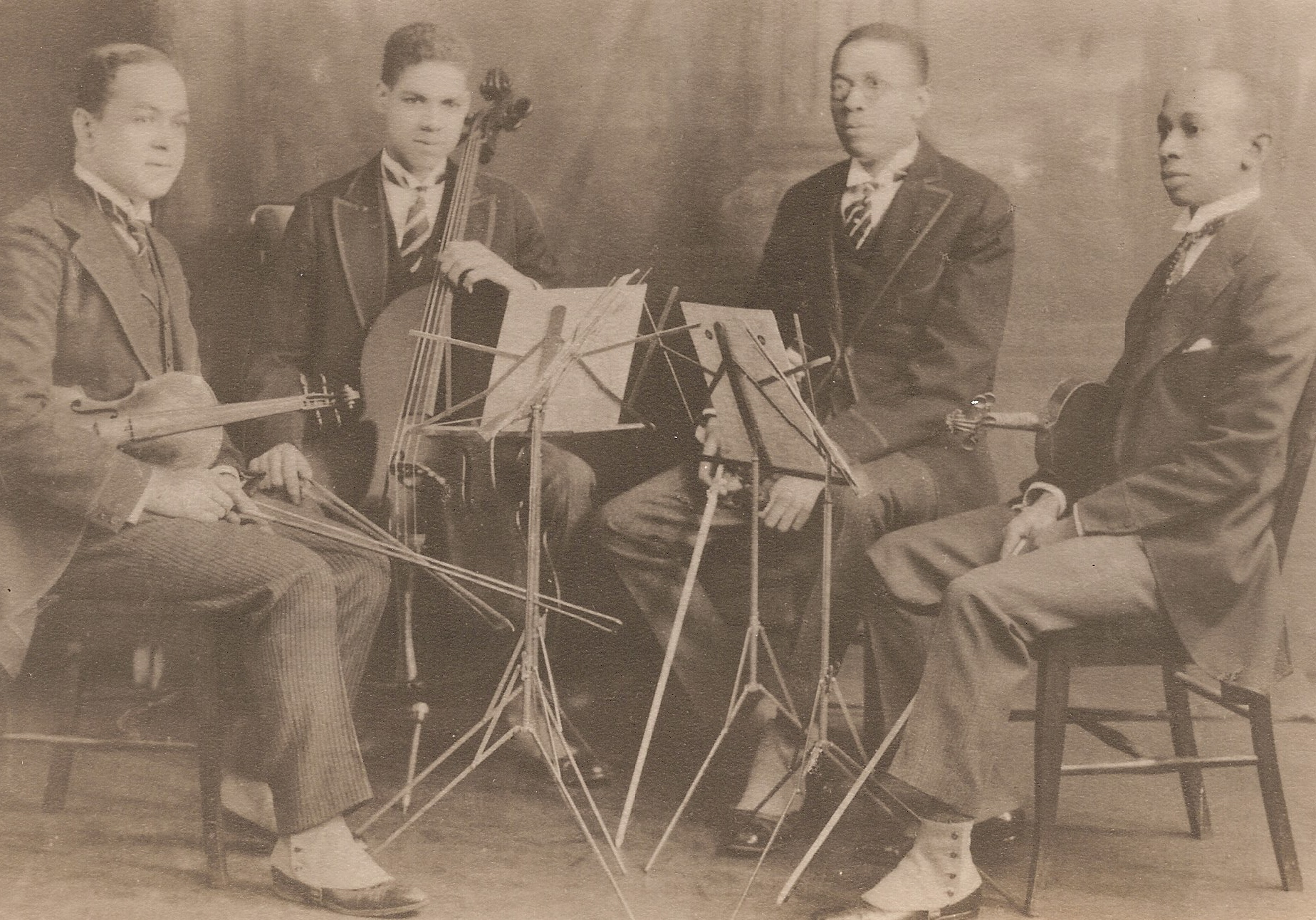
L-R: Felix Weir, Marion Cumbo, Hall Johnson, Arthur Boyd- Members of the Negro String Quartet.

Felix Weir (October 8, 1884 – 1978) was an active African-American violinist during the early 20th century. He was a prominent performer, winning recognition for his virtuosity at a young age. He studied at the Chicago Musical College and the Conservatory at Leipzig, Germany (known today as the University of Music and Theatre Leipzig).

Weir was born in Chicago, Illinois, United States, to parents Charles L. and Frances Fowler Weir.

He attended Chicago public schools and studied music at the Chicago Conservatory of Music, where he won the Diamond medal when he graduated.

In 1904, Weir traveled to Germany to study music. He had planned to stay up to three years, but his uncle, David Weir, the owner of a catering business in Chicago, died unexpectedly in 1905, and the family urged Felix to return home.

Weir remained an active performer throughout his life, most actively in the 1920s and 1930s when he notably performed with the Clef Club orchestras and in Broadway theatre musicals. He was concertmaster for the 1921 version of Shuffle Along, the musical with book by F.E. Miller and Aubrey Lyles and music by Eubie Blake and Noble Sissle. Weir is particularly known for his collaboration with cellist Leonard Jeter (1881–1970) and eventually Jeter's sister Olyve, a pianist. In about 1914, Weir and Leonard Jeter founded the American String Quartet. Later, in 1920, Weir founded the Negro String Quartet, with Weir and Arthur Boyd as first and second violins, Hall Johnson playing viola, and Marion Combo playing the cello. The quartet played at venues around New York City, and was active until 1933.

Weir was also a devoted teacher, teaching music and orchestra in public schools in Washington, D.C. He retired from the city's Cardozo High School in 1942, and later lived with his son, Dr. Reginald Weir, tennis player and physician, and his son's family in Fair Lawn, New Jersey.

== Bibliography ==
- Southern, Eileen (1997). The Music of Black Americans. W. W. Norton & Company, Inc. ISBN 0-393-03843-2
