= Stephan Dweck =

American lawyer and humorist

Stephan Dweck (born 1960) is an American humorist, attorney, radio show host and the author or co-author of several books.

He co-hosted one of the first African American radio sports show, Sports Funk on WFAN-AM radio in New York City with Monteria Ivey. Dweck and Ivey lived in the Frederick Douglass Houses housing project in Manhattan Valley, Manhattan.

Ivey, Dweck and James Percelay co-authored numerous books on African-American humor, from slavery to American ghettos, including the Snaps trilogy. Ivey and Dweck also wrote two books on pick-up lines called You're So Fine I'd Drink a Tub of Your Bathwater and Baby, All Those Curves. And Me With No Brakes. Other books include Laugh Your Ass Off: The Big Book of African American Humor and The Field Guide to White People.

Dweck executive produced the Snaps series for HBO and the animated show The Big Head People for Spike TV. He has worked as a screenwriter for Eddie Murphy Productions and Miramax Films. He also was a regular guest on the IMUS in the morning program.

He is a graduate of Dartmouth College, where he received the Ernest E. Just award for academic excellence. He is a member of Alpha Phi Alpha fraternity, and a member of the New York, New Jersey and Connecticut bar. As an attorney he has represented several rappers, singers and actors, including the cast of the film Paris Is Burning in their lawsuit against the producers of the film. He is also the Executive Producer of Film "No Address" starring Ashanti, Beverly De' Angelo, and Billy Baldwin. He is the executive producer of the film HoodPranks and the executive producer of the movie Mr.Watergate. He is the executive producer of the film "The Plus One". For the past 25 years he has been part of the management team for the artist Ashanti. He is an entertainment lawyer in New York City.
