= Leathe Colvert Hemachandra =

American educator (1900–1953)

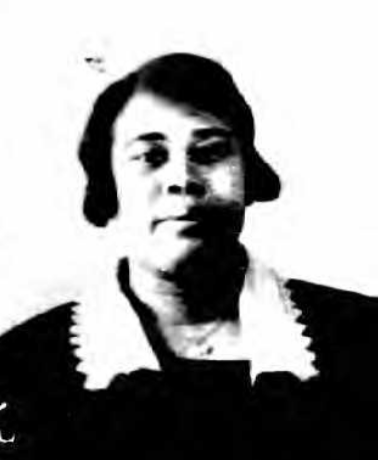
- Leathe Hemachandra's passport photograph from 1924
- Born: Leathe Wade Colvert; January 19, 1900; New York City, New York, U.S.
- Died: April 25, 1953 (aged 53); New York City, New York, US
- Occupation: Educator

Leathe Colvert Hemachandra (January 19, 1900 – April 25, 1953), born Leathe Wade Colvert, was an American educator.

== Early life ==
Leathe Wade Colvert was born in 1900 in New York City, the daughter of William Colvert and Martha A. Pleasant Colvert. She graduated from Hunter College in 1921.

== Career ==
As a young woman in 1919, Leathe Colvert acted in the Provincetown Players production of The Dreamy Kid.

Hemachandra taught at public schools in New York City. In 1940, Mayor Fiorello La Guardia recognized her for her "distinguished service" in the schools, and she was named one of the city's 25 best teachers.

In 1942, she served on a committee of "prominent citizens" of Harlem, including Countee Cullen and Shelton Hale Bishop, to judge auditions for young singers. She was outspoken on the topic of juvenile delinquency, which she preferred to label "parental delinquency". In the 1940s, she taught Black history classes for teachers.

Hemachandra was president (basileus) of the Tau Omega chapter of Alpha Kappa Alpha. was national director of publicity for Alpha Kappa Alpha in the 1940s.

She was a member of the Jamaica, New York, branch of the NAACP, and served on its women's committee. She also wrote poetry. Her son set one of her poems to music.

== Personal life ==
Leathe Colvert married Balatunga E. Hemachandra in 1923, in New York. He was born in Ceylon and was a British subject; they met in Paris. They lived in St. Albans, and had a son, Neal, born in 1930. She was widowed in 1945, and she died from a stroke in 1953, aged 53 years, at a hospital in New York City.
