= Reginald Weir =

American tennis player

Reggie Weir
- Full name: Reginald Storum Weir
- Country (sports): USA
- Born: 30 September 1911 Washington, D.C., United States
- Died: 22 August 1987 (Age 75) Fair Lawn, United States
- Turned pro: 1931 (amateur tour)
- Retired: 1973

Singles
- Career record: 53–71
- Career titles: 6

Reginald Storum Weir also known as Reggie Weir (September 30, 1911 – August 22, 1987) was an American tennis player and physician. He was active from 1931 to 1973 and won 6 career titles, 5 of which came at the ATA National Championships (1931–33, 1937, 1942).

== Tennis career ==
Weir was captain of the City College of New York men's tennis team. After graduating from CCNY in 1931, he was American Tennis Association (ATA) national champion in 1931, 1932, 1933, 1937, and 1942.

With the support of the NAACP, Weir and a partner originally attempted to play at a United States Lawn Tennis Association's (USLTA)-sponsored indoor tournament in 1929, but they were turned away when organizers realized he was African-American. Later, in 1948, he successfully gained entrance to the USLTA's National Indoor Tournament in New York, becoming the first African-American man to play at a USLTA event. He won his first-round game on March 11, 1948, but did not advance further. His entrance to the tournament was the result of several years of lobbying by the ATA, and paved the way for Althea Gibson to be accepted and advance to the quarterfinals the following year.

== Outside of tennis ==
Weir was born on September 30, 1911, in Washington, D.C., to parents, Felix Weir, American violinist and educator, and Ethel Storum Weir. A resident of Fair Lawn, New Jersey, he died there on August 22, 1987. Weir was a graduate of the medical school of New York University and practiced family medicine from 1935 to 1985.
