= Manhattan Valley =

Neighborhood in New York City

Coordinates: 40°47′57″N 73°57′46″W

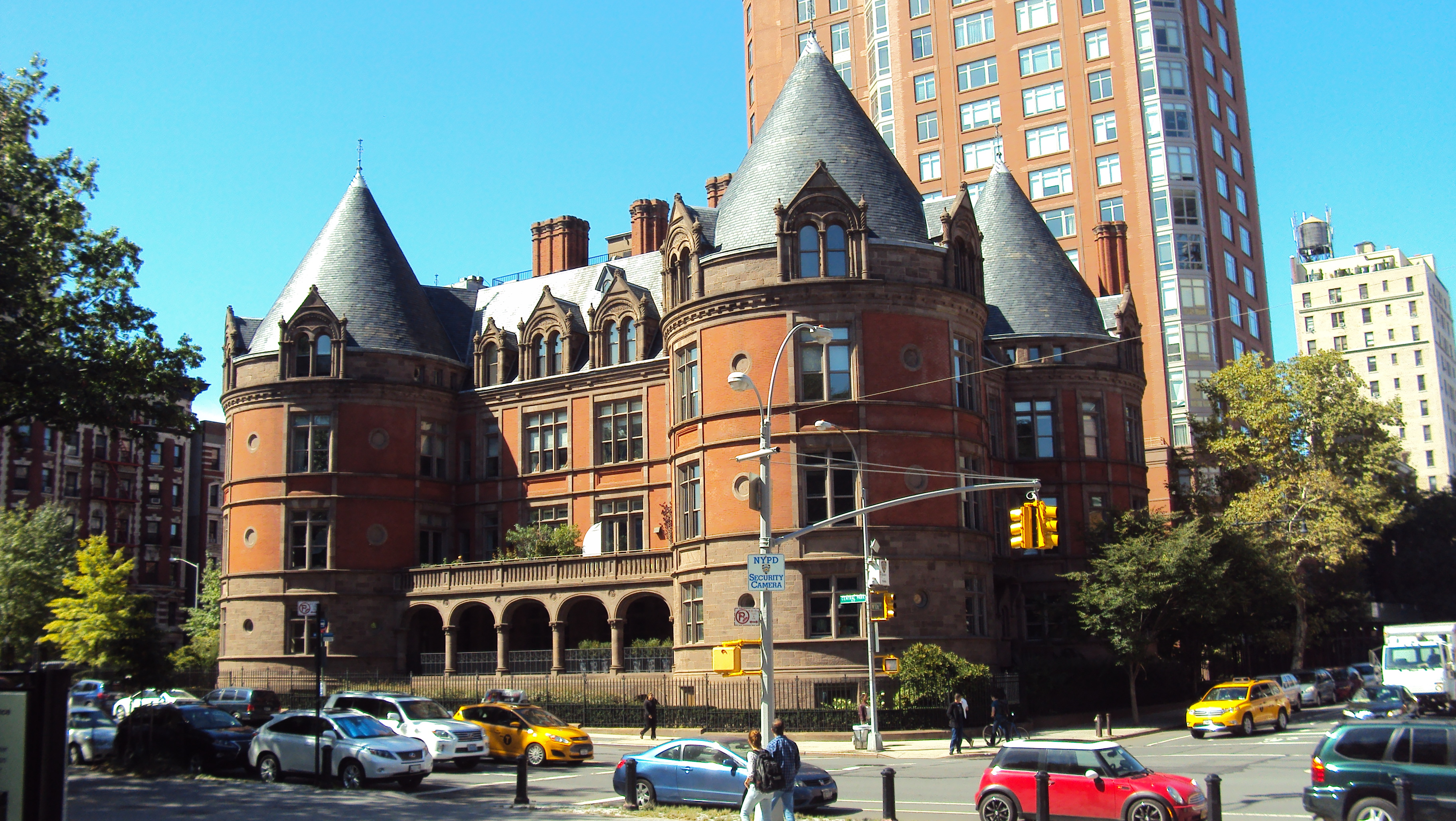
The former New York Cancer Hospital (now a condominium), at Central Park West and 106th St.

Manhattan Valley is a neighborhood in the northern part of the Upper West Side of Manhattan in New York City. It is bounded by West 110th Street to the north, Central Park West to the east, West 96th Street to the south, and Broadway to the west.

== Geography ==
Manhattan Valley occupies a natural depression adjacent to higher ground to the south, west and north. According to at least one old map, streams once flowed east through the area into what is now Central Park.

From west to east, Broadway, Amsterdam Avenue, Columbus Avenue, Manhattan Avenue, and Central Park West are north–south thoroughfares through the neighborhood. Amsterdam Avenue, Broadway, and Central Park West proceed in an uninterrupted grid; Columbus Avenue becomes Morningside Drive north of W. 110th Street. Manhattan Avenue originates at 100th Street and proceeds north into Harlem. Several large swaths of Manhattan Valley are made up of residential developments that break the regular city street grid. The area from W. 100th to W. 97th Streets between Central Park West and Amsterdam Avenue consists of Park West Village, a "towers in a park" housing development. Another superblock, occupied by the Frederick Douglass Houses, lies just to the north, bordered by Amsterdam Avenue, W. 100th Street, Manhattan Avenue, and West 104th Street. Columbus Avenue also passes through both of these developments.

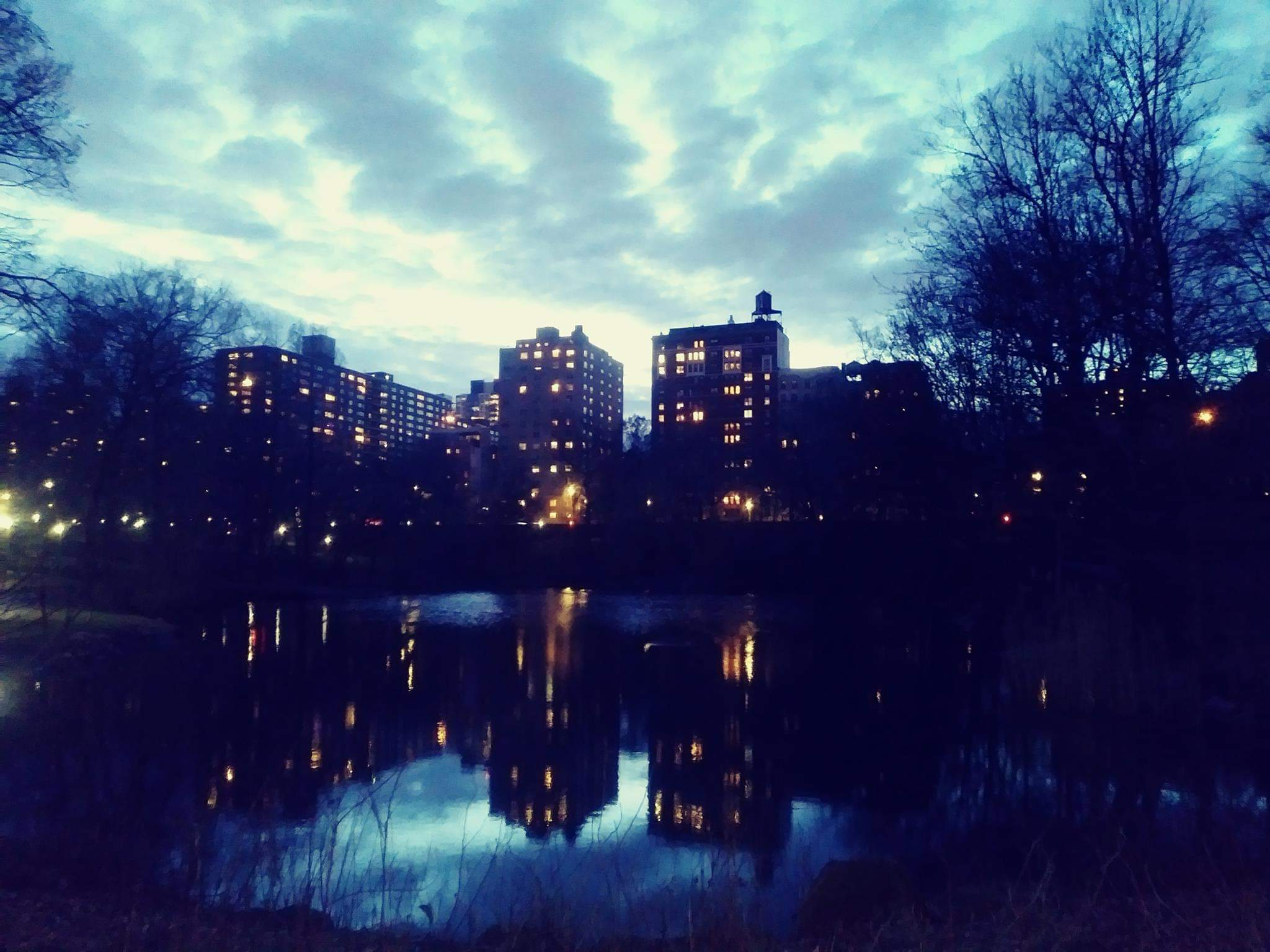
Manhattan Valley: buildings on Central Park West from 100th-102nd Streets, seen from Central Park

== History ==
=== Development ===
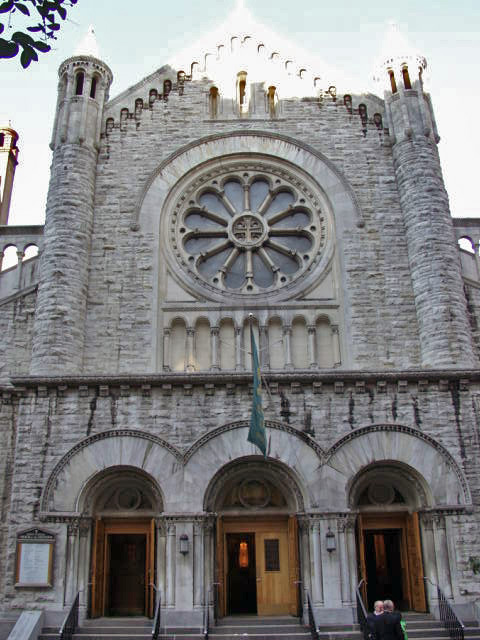
Church of the Ascension, at 107th Street between Amsterdam Avenue and Broadway

Manhattan Valley was part of the Bloomingdale District, the name given to the farms and houses along the Bloomingdale Road along Manhattan's Upper West Side. The Dutch Bloemendaal was Anglicized to "Bloomingdale" or "the Bloomingdale District", for the west side of Manhattan from about 23rd Street up to the Hollow Way (modern 125th Street). It originally consisted of farms and villages along a road (regularized in 1703) known as the Bloomingdale Road. Bloomingdale Road was renamed The Boulevard in 1868, as the farms and villages were divided into building lots and absorbed into the city.

By the 18th century it contained numerous farms and country residences of many of the city's well-off, a major parcel of which was the Apthorp Farm. The main artery was the Bloomingdale Road, which began north of where Broadway and the Bowery Lane (now Fourth Avenue) join (at modern Union Square) and wended its way northward to about modern 116th Street in Morningside Heights, where the road farther north was known as the Kingsbridge Road. Within the confines of the modern-day Upper West Side, the road passed through the hamlets of Harsenville, bounded by 68th Street, 81st Street, Central Park West, and the Hudson River; Strycker's Bay, located on a now-infilled inlet between 86th and 96th Streets; and Bloomingdale Village, a place near the current Columbia University campus.

In the early 1800s, John Clendening owned a farm that covered much of the valley, roughly from the Bloomingdale Road to 8th Avenue between 99th and 105th Streets, with a large mansion near Amsterdam and 104th Streets. (Note: As the farm was acquired prior to the introduction of the Commissioners' Plan of 1811, the boundaries of the farm did not line up precisely with the modern streets set up in the grid plan.) The area was known as the "Clendening Valley". Although the Clendening estate was divided and sold in 1845, the Clendening Valley name persisted until the 1880s, and a Clendening Hotel existed into the early 20th century.

The construction of an elevated aqueduct to carry the Croton Aqueduct over the valley in 1838–1842 separated the eastern side of the valley from the village of Bloomingdale, which had emerged around the Bloomingdale Road until the 1870s, when it was replaced with an underground inverted siphon, and the old aqueduct was torn down. Early development in the 1870s and 1880s focused on institutional care for the sick or aged, and included the Hebrew Home for the Aged, the Catholic Old Age Home, the Home for Respectable Aged Indigent Females, and the Towers Nursing Home constructed as a cancer ward by John Jacob Astor III in 1884. Also located in Manhattan Valley at the time was the New York Cancer Hospital, which was built in 1887 at 455 Central Park West. These, together with the Lion Brewery, gave the area its earliest landmarks. The neighborhood began to fill out residentially at the end of the 19th century and beginning of the 20th, when the New York City Subway's IRT Ninth Avenue Line in 1870 and the IRT Broadway – Seventh Avenue Line in 1904 allowed the public ready access to uptown Manhattan. Columbia's purchase of the Bloomingdale Lunatic Asylum at around the same time as the subway's arrival naturally made the neighborhood more attractive as well.

The area was populated mostly by Irish and German immigrants through the 1950s. Young boys and girls took advantage of Central Park and Riverside Drive or played stickball and roller hockey in the streets. The 1950s saw many migrants from Puerto Rico take up residence on the Upper West Side, and a proposed project to eliminate the older brownstone apartments began to drive earlier residents to the suburbs.

=== Later years ===
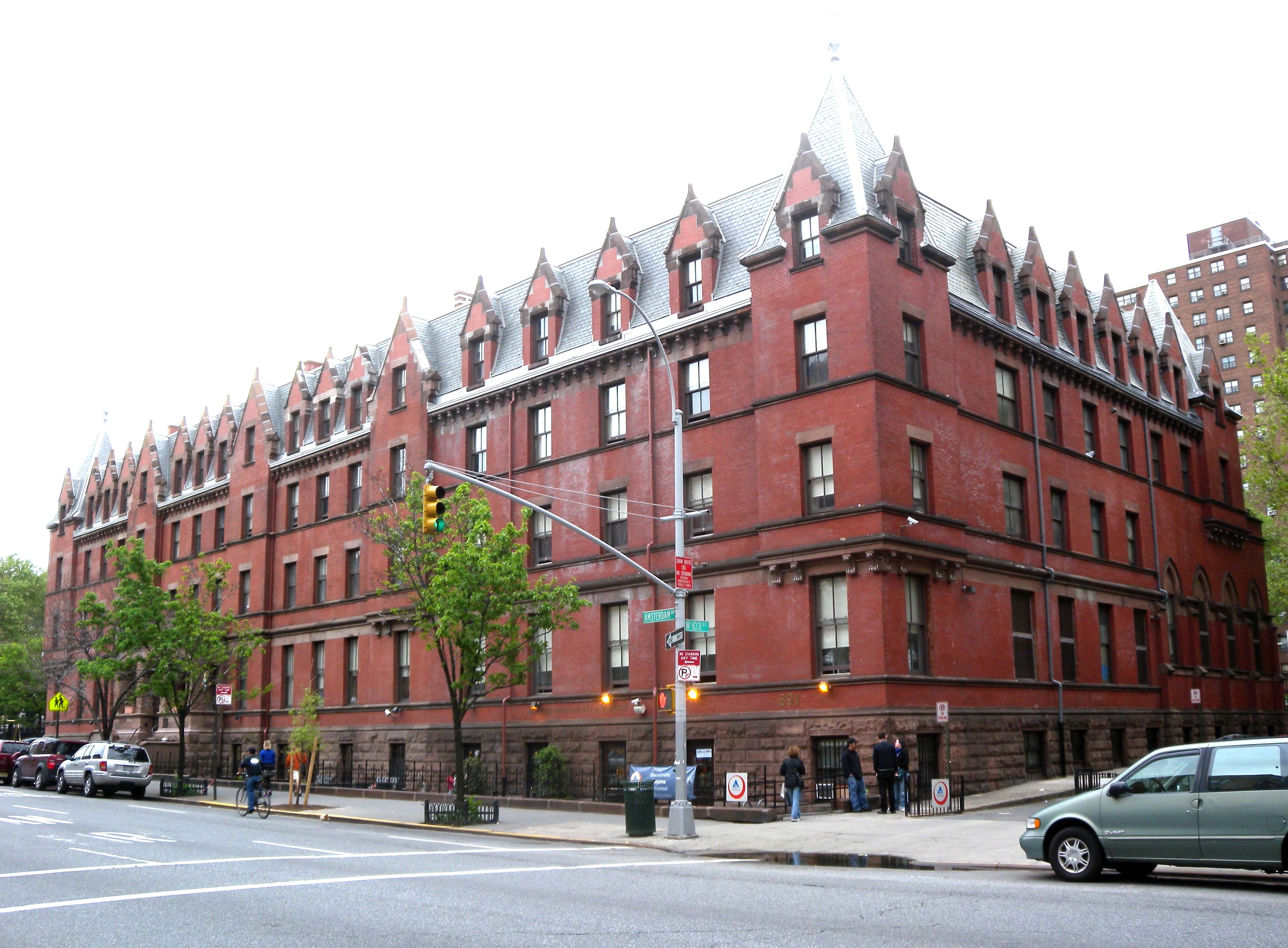
The American Youth Hostels building at Amsterdam and 103rd, formerly the Association Residence Nursing Home, is one of architect Richard Morris Hunt's few surviving projects in New York City.

By the 1950s and 1960s, the area went into decline, in line with a trend of general urban deterioration in Manhattan. As middle-class residents left for the suburbs, buildings were allowed to fall into disrepair and were divided into small units for new low-rent tenants, many of them originally from Puerto Rico. Urban renewal programs, headed by city planner Robert Moses, called for several city blocks to be demolished in order to construct the Frederick Douglass Houses in the superblock where they stand today. The development of the Douglass Houses greatly increased the density of low-income renters without providing much in the way of amenities (food shops, clubs, restaurants, and open space) for them to use. Rampant graft and corruption associated with the project blighted their opening and brought ill repute to the neighborhood, and the debacle contributed strongly to Moses's fall from power and ouster. Although community groups such as the Manhattan Valley Development Corporation tried to find alternative solutions for the housing shortage in the area, the city's 1976 fiscal crisis caused many of these alternate plans to be shelved.

The crime rate in the area increased dramatically, along with drug use and poverty. By 1960, the Bloomingdale neighborhood had the highest juvenile-delinquency rate in Manhattan and the second-highest number of welfare cases per 1,000 residents. New investment came to the area in the 1980s. Soon, however, new investment was brought to a halt by wavering property prices in the late 1980s and early 1990s, combined with the rise of crack use and dealers in the area, which gave Manhattan Valley the reputation as one of the easiest places in the city to score a hit. In addition, there was a lot of violence on the streets of Manhattan Valley, especially at night, when gang wars were prevalent.

With the Wall Street boom in the early 1980s, Manhattan as a whole experienced a sharp recovery. Seventy years after the Bloomingdale Asylum's closing, the provenance of the name was fading into obscurity, and residents and brokers alike began referring to the neighborhood by its present name. The new name and recovery were both much bolstered by the non-profit Manhattan Valley Development Corporation (MVDC), founded in 1968. It sought to differentiate itself from other community-development organizations by opposing the demolition of pre-war buildings in favor of renovation and seeking to promote small business and "prevent harassment by out-side management companies prevalent in low income 'minority' neighborhoods."

=== Gentrification ===
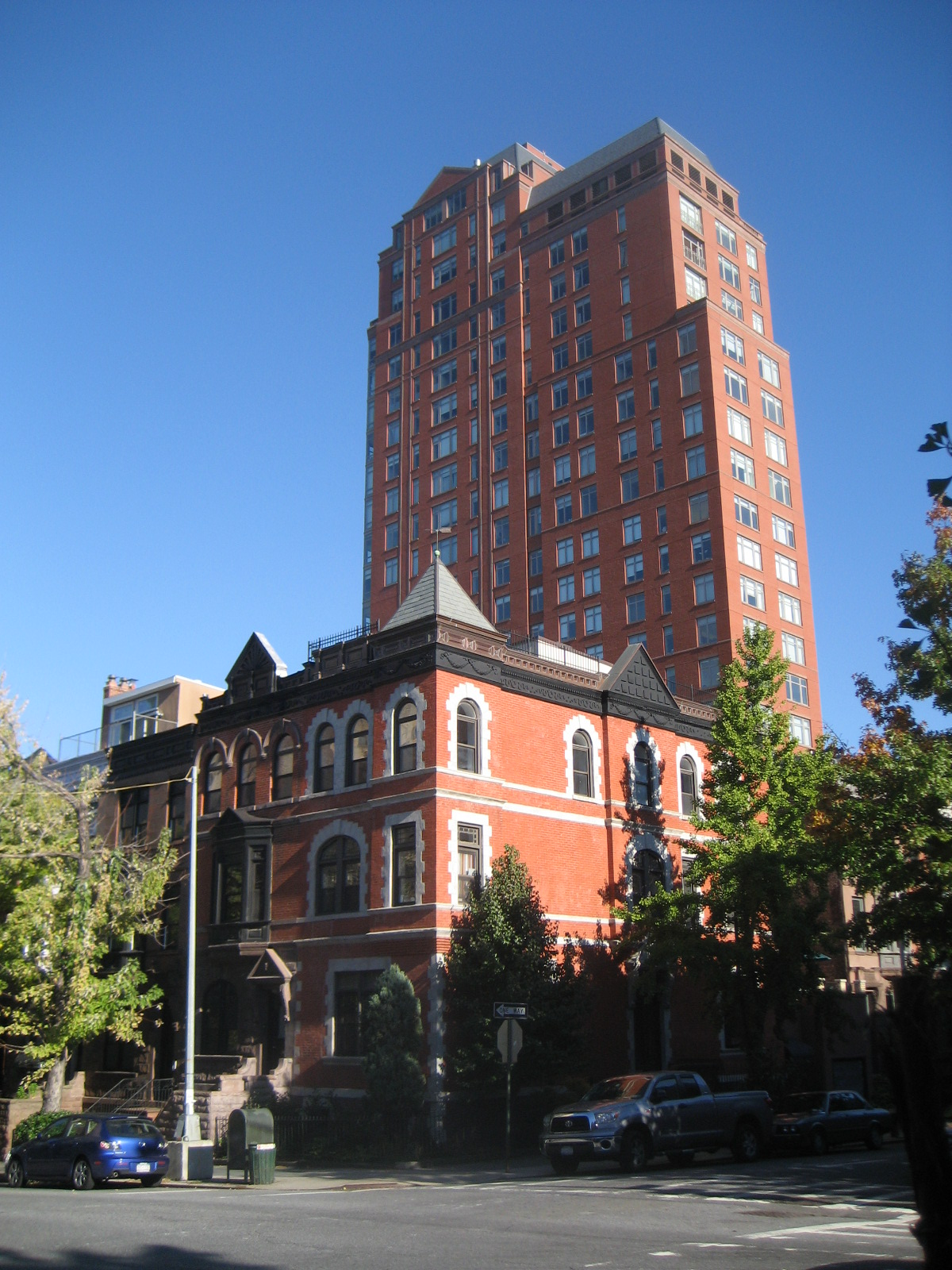
The Manhattan Avenue Historic District

Manhattan Valley has gentrified significantly since the 1980s. With this gentrification, rents in the area rose. The estimated population of Latino residents was fast dwindling by 1987. Meanwhile, nonprofit groups started to renovate many structures that were owned by the city, as well as build housing on previously vacant tracts of land. Reactions to this gentrification were mixed. In 1990, one resident stated, "The crime situation is our biggest threat ... but if we get rid of it, we're also faced with gentrification." Coinciding with this gentrification in 1990, crime was declining steeply, although drug dealings were still common: one large drug arrest had been made in December of that year. The Frederick Douglass Houses, which had become frequented by drug dealers, was thought to be stymieing the development of new housing in the area, which included two apartment towers that had been constructed in the preceding two years.

The Columbus Amsterdam business improvement district was organized in the late 1990s to develop stronger business presence along the main thoroughfares of Columbus and Amsterdam Avenues, and to provide entrepreneurial opportunities to locals.

Apartment block in Park West Village, in the Manhattan Valley neighborhood.

In 2005, brokers estimated that properties in the area were approximately 30% less expensive than comparable properties in the adjacent south. The neighborhood's proximity to the much-valued Central Park as well as to three separate subway lines make it attractive to young commuters, and, as of 2006, prices were rising dramatically as New Yorkers were tipped off by their brokers. Many historical brownstones and townhouses were saved from demolition, particularly east of Columbus Avenue, where the property values are the highest. Yet the area remains diverse, representing a microcosm of the larger city in terms of the different ethnicities, ages and socioeconomic groups living within the same community.

== Demographics ==
According to the 2000 United States census (in which Manhattan Valley's census tracts are 187, 189, 191, 193, and 195), 48,983 people live in the community. Of the population, 44% are of Latino origin, 32% are African Americans, and 24% are Asians, whites, and other races. Fifty-five percent of the residents are of very low income (below 50% of the area's median family income, which is $13,854). In 2009, the more affluent families resided west of Broadway and east of Manhattan Avenue. Of the Manhattan Valley population, 20.76% had income from Social Security and 23% relied on public assistance.

== Landmarks ==
- Frederick Douglass Circle, Central Park West and West 110th Street
- The former East River Savings Bank, which became the Aspirineum, housing a pharmacy, Amsterdam Avenue and West 96th Street
- Church of the Ascension, West 107th Street between Broadway and Amsterdam Avenue
- Straus Park, Broadway and West 106th Street
- The former New York Cancer Hospital at 455 Central Park West between 105th and 106th streets.
- Hotel Marseilles, a New York City designated landmark at Broadway and 103rd Street
- Manhasset Apartments, a New York City designated landmark at Broadway between 108th and 109th streets
- Riverside–West 105th Street Historic District, a New York City designated landmark district

== Notable residents ==
- Ira Cohen, the poet, lived in an apartment at 106th Street and Broadway.
- Barack Obama, later the 44th U.S. president, rented an apartment at 142 West 109th Street, between Columbus Avenue and Amsterdam Avenue, while a student at Columbia University.

=== The Central Park View ===
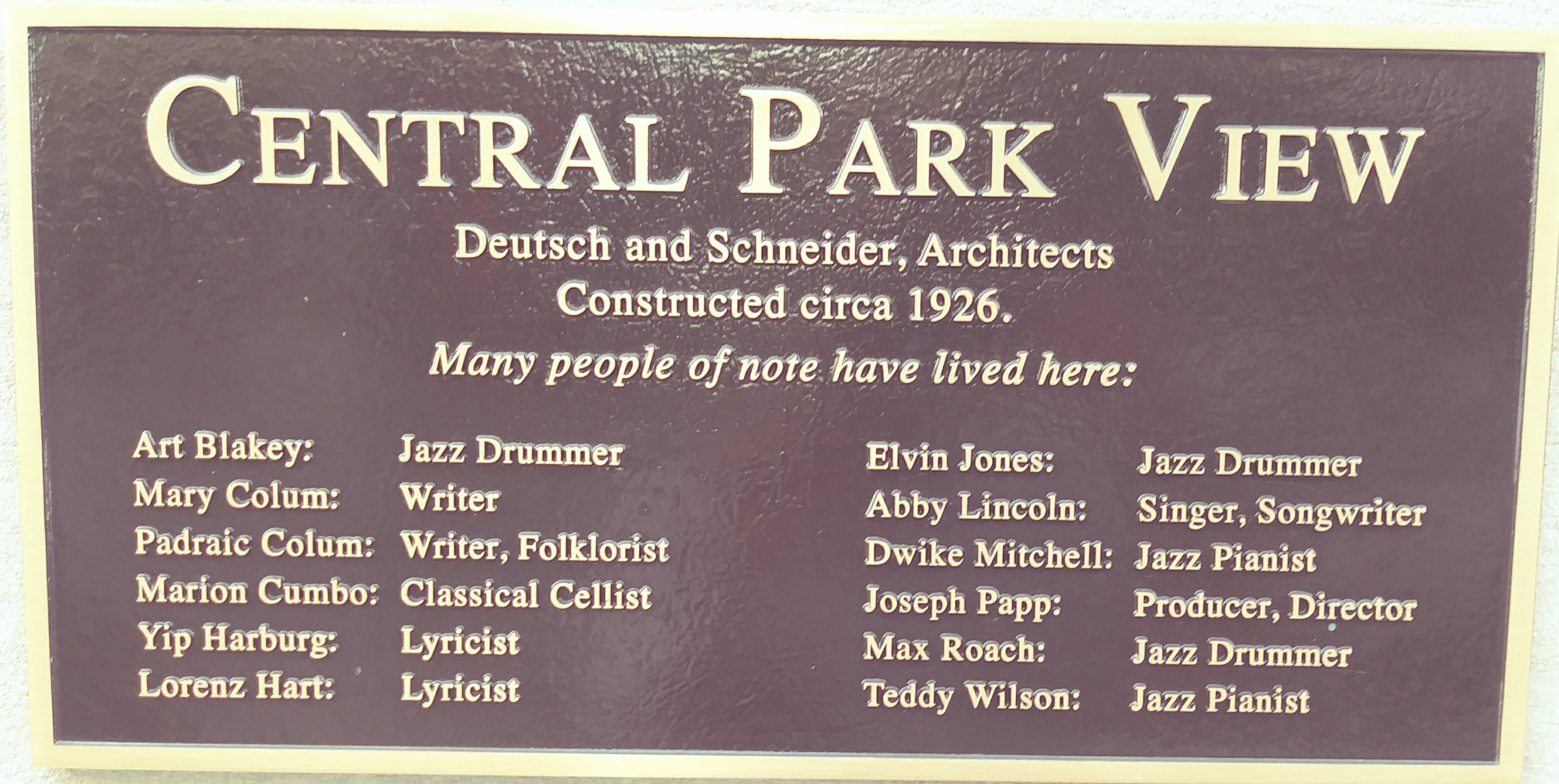
Plaque at 415 Central Park West listing notable residents

A plaque on the outside wall of the Central Park View, an apartment building at 415 Central Park West (at 101st Street), names the following as "people of note" who have lived there:

- Art Blakey
- Mary Colum
- Padraic Colum
- Marion Cumbo
- Yip Harburg
- Lorenz Hart
- Elvin Jones
- "Abby Lincoln" (Abbey Lincoln)
- Dwike Mitchell
- Joseph Papp
- Max Roach
- Teddy Wilson
