= Linda Polach =

American news media executive (born 1951)

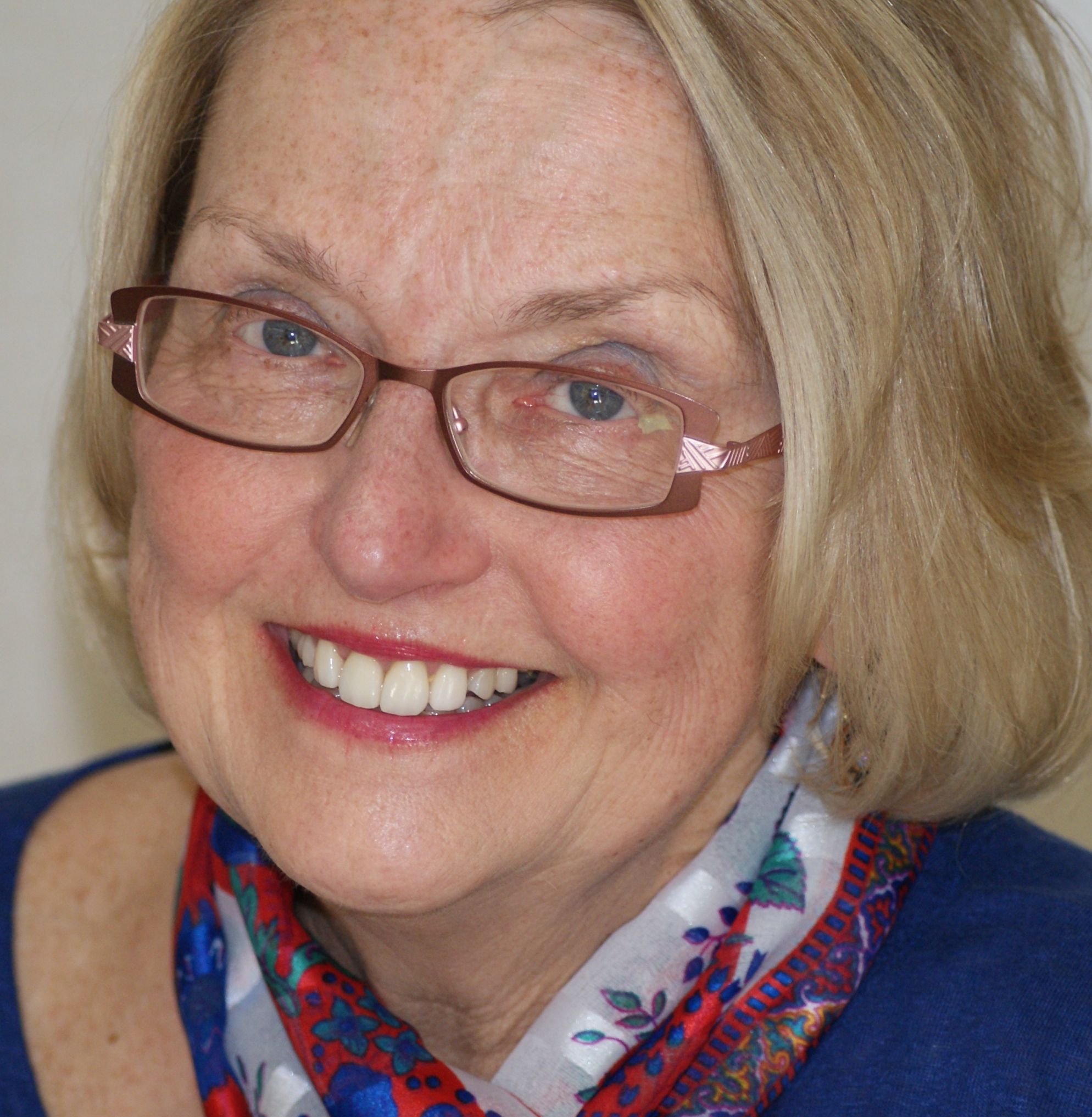
- Polach in 2013
- Born: Linda Louise Polach; June 20, 1951 (age 75); Chicago, Illinois
- Occupations: News Media Executive, News producer Journalist
- Years active: 1974–present
- Spouse: Jim Boyd (m. 1984; died 2026)
- Children: 2

Linda Polach (born June 20, 1951) is an American news media executive. She is currently Executive Director of the WGBH Studio located at for the Boston Public Library for WGBH Educational Foundation in Boston, Massachusetts, operator of WGBH-TV Channel 2 and its all-news radio station WGBH (FM) in Boston, Mass. The studio is one of, if not the only, Public TV/Radio Studios situated in a Public Library anywhere in the world.

== Early life and education ==
Born in Chicago, Illinois Polach is the daughter of Ella Jarolim and Jerry Adam Polach. Her mother grew up in rural Hoxeyville, Michigan. Her father was a US Post Office employee and bank employee from Chicago. He served in the US Army during World War II and spent 26 months as a prisoner of war* after being captured in North Africa. Polach is the product of a Catholic education. She attended St. Adrian Elementary School and Maria High School (Chicago, Illinois). She earned a Bachelor of Arts degree from St. Procopius College (now Benedictine University) in Lisle, Illinois and a master's degree in Journalism from Boston University.

== Career ==
Polach began a career as a teacher at her alma mater Maria High after graduation from St. Procopius. But the lure of journalism that Polach credits to her father's avid newspaper reading and appetite for politics caused her to change careers. As a journalism grad student she took an internship at WCVB-TV and was eventually hired by the station.

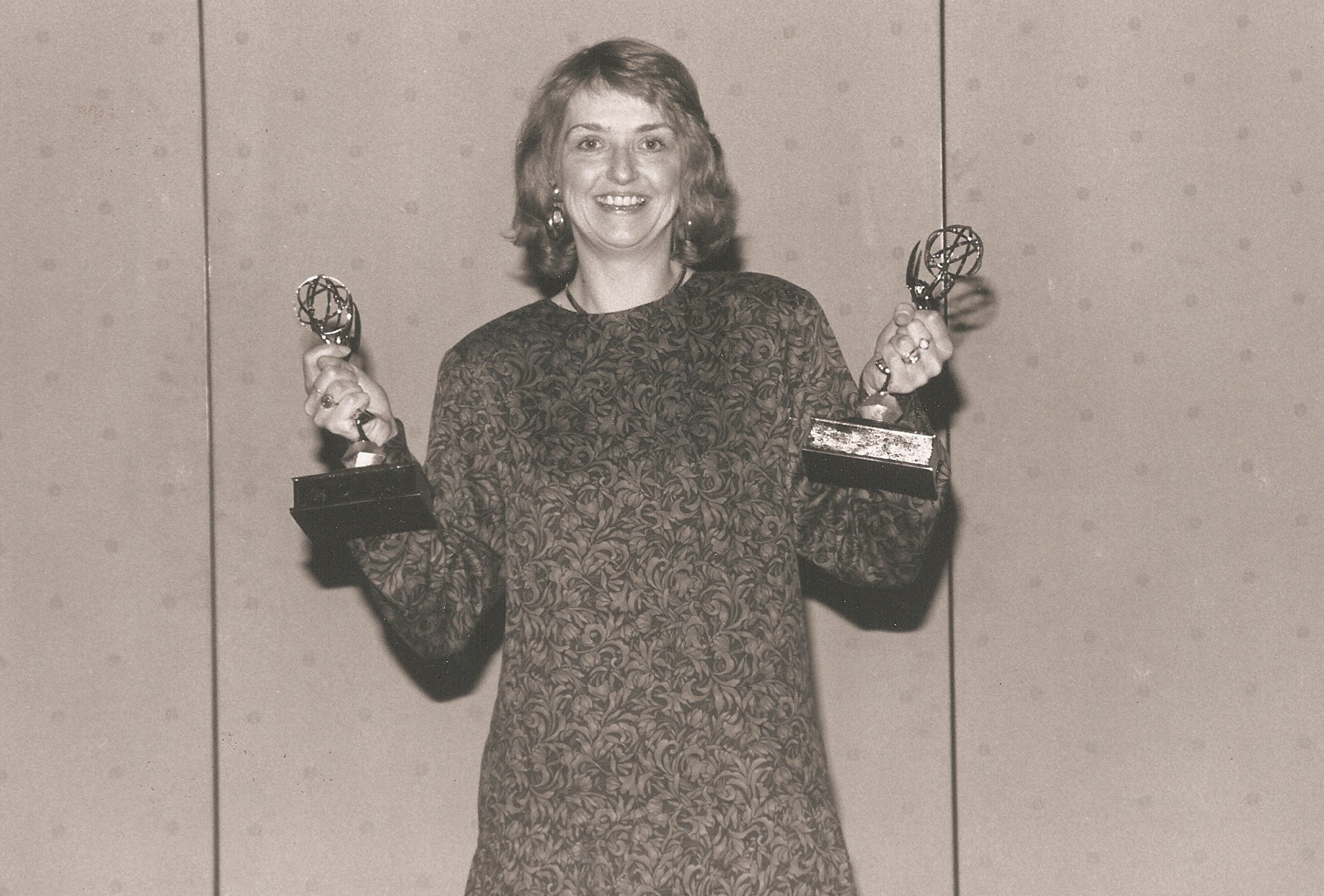
Special Project Producer Linda Polach with Emmys for Space Shuttle Challenger Disaster Coverage

She took on assignments as a news producer, executive producer, director of special projects, planning editor during her 29 years with the American Broadcasting Company affiliate station in Boston. Polach produced WCVB-TV's annual live coverage of the Boston Marathon for more than two decades and in her various capacities won several awards including Emmy Awards for coverage of 1986 Space Shuttle Challenger disaster.

- In 2007 Polach joined WGBH-TV as executive producer of Greater Boston with Emily Rooney and Beat the Press
