= Ellis Douek =

British surgeon (1934–2024)

- Born: 25 April 1934; Cairo, Egypt
- Died: 20 May 2024 (aged 90); London, England
- Occupations: Surgeon and cochlear implant pioneer
- Relatives: Claudia Roden (sister)

Ellis Douek FRCS (25 April 1934 – 20 May 2024) was a British surgeon and cochlear implant pioneer.

== Biography ==
Douek was born in Cairo, Egypt on 25 April 1934, the son of Cesar Elie Douek and his wife Nelly Sassoon. His parents were both from Syrian-Jewish merchant families, and he grew up in Zamalek, Cairo, with his sister Claudia, and brother Zaki.

Douek was a Fellow of the Royal College of Surgeons during his early career. He worked as a consultant otologist at Guy's Hospital between 1970 and 1999, later taking on the title of Emeritus. He became chairman of the hospital's Hearing Research Group in 1974 and held the position until 1999. This group experimented with an "extracochlear electrode that was stationed on the promontory near the round window" at the behest of the Department of Health, which had been encouraged by Deaf MP Jack Ashley. In 1975, he was a member of the Medical Research Council's Hearing Research and, in 1978, the Royal Society of Medicine awarded him the Dalby Prize for hearing research. He served as the Medical Research Council Representative to the European Communities on Hearing Research in 1980 and as the UK Representative to European Communities on Industrial Deafness in 1983.

Douek died on 20 May 2024, at the age of 90.

== Autobiographies ==
Douek is the author of the autobiography A Middle Eastern Affair (2004) (ISBN 978-1870015875), and the medical memoir To Hear Again, To Sing Again (2022).
