= 53rd Street Crosstown Line =

The 53rd Street Crosstown Line was a surface transit line in Manhattan, New York City, United States, running along 53rd Street in Midtown, between Sixth Avenue and Ninth Avenue. It served as a connection between north–south lines during the times that they were not affiliated with the 59th Street Crosstown Line. The street is no longer used by buses, which now use 59th Street to make the crosstown connection.

== History ==
The tracks in 53rd Street were added in 1894, when the Broadway and Columbus Avenue Line, a cable car line, opened. However, the Metropolitan had a lease on the Central Park, North and East River Railroad, the owner of the 59th Street Crosstown Line, and used 59th Street as a connection in the Sixth and Amsterdam Avenues Line. After the Broadway and Columbus Avenue Line was converted to electricity in 1901, those cars were also moved to 59th Street, and a new service - the 53rd Street Line - was added. The route began at Sixth Avenue and 50th Street and traveled north on Sixth Avenue for three blocks, west on 53rd Street to Ninth Avenue, and north on Ninth Avenue to 54th Street.

Effective August 6, 1908, the CPN&ER was separated from the bankrupt Metropolitan, and three lines - the Broadway and Amsterdam Avenue Line, Broadway and Columbus Avenue Line, and Sixth and Amsterdam Avenues Line - were placed on 53rd.

The Ninth Avenue Railroad, which owned the trackage on 53rd Street between Seventh and Ninth Avenues, was split from New York Railways, the Metropolitan's successor, in 1919. The Broadway and Amsterdam Avenue Line and Sixth and Amsterdam Avenues Line were discontinued, while the Broadway and Columbus Avenue Line remained, using trackage rights over the Ninth Avenue's trackage on 53rd Street and Ninth Avenue south of Broadway to reach Columbus Avenue. The Ninth Avenue Railroad brought back the old 53rd Street shuttle to Sixth Avenue.

On February 12, 1936, New York City Omnibus Corporation buses replaced the trolleys on the Broadway and Columbus Avenue Line, ending use of the 53rd Street tracks. The replacement bus - now the M7 - used 54th Street eastbound and 55th Street westbound until after the 59th Street Crosstown Line was replaced by buses.
