= Think Twice (game show) =

- Created by: Mark Maxwell-Smith; Michael Bevan; Bob Boden
- Directed by: Hugh Martin
- Presented by: Monteria Ivey
- Narrated by: Chris Zito
- Country of origin: United States

Production
- Executive producer: Nancy Linde
- Production locations: WGBH Studios; Boston, Massachusetts
- Running time: 30 minutes

Original release
- Network: PBS
- Release: October 10, 1994 – March 6, 1995

Think Twice is a weekend primetime PBS game show hosted by Monteria Ivey and produced by and taped at WGBH-TV in Boston, Massachusetts which ran from October 10, 1994 to March 6, 1995.

== Gameplay ==
Two teams of two compete in a game that challenges their information, imagination, and intuition.

=== The Main Game ===
==== Round 1 (Information) ====
This round is called the "Information Round" because it quizzes the contestants on their height of information. In this round, host Ivey reads a series of questions each with two parts. The first player to buzz-in gets to answer the question; but he/she can only answer one half, because in order to score, his/her partner must answer the other half without conferring. An incorrect answer from the buzz-in player gives the other team the right to answer either half of the question to score, but an incorrect answer from the partner causes the opposing team to capitalize on that miss.

Each correct answer/complete question is worth 10 points. This round is played in an unmentioned time limit; the sound of a cuckoo (sometimes jokingly called a "dying quail" or some variation thereof by host Ivey) signals the end of the round.

==== Round 2 (Imagination) ====
In the "Imagination Round", the contestants were being tested on their creative ability. Before the show, each team had 60 seconds to review a list of nine words/phrases which are all clues to a puzzle. Now on a team's turn (starting with the team with the lowest score), each player had 30 seconds to make up a story using those clues with a minimum of six. Each clue is revealed on a video wall which is turned away from the other team so that they won't see what clues are revealed.

When the storytelling team is done, host Ivey tells the opposing team how many clues were used; if less than six were used, another clue was revealed on the board, but if six or more were used, nothing happens. The opposing team then confer on what they heard and what clues they might have said; then they have a chance guess the subject. When they took their guess, they got a chance to look at what clues were revealed on the board as well as the clues unrevealed, then the subject is revealed. If they are correct they win 50 points; otherwise the storytelling team got the points.

Note: If at any time the storytelling team says the subject, the opposing team automatically gets the 50 points by default.

==== Round 3 (Intuition) ====
The teams were tested on their intuition in this final round of the main game appropriately called the "Intuition Round". Much like Family Feud and Hot Potato, a question with a list of answers was read by host Ivey. On a player's turn (starting with the player on the team that's behind) he/she must give an answer that he/she thinks is on the list. After that, the opposing team can either accept or challenge that answer. They make their decision by pressing a colored button and light up a matching colored light; an acceptance is indicated by a green light (by pressing the green button), and a challenge is indicated by a red light (by pressing the red button). If the team is split in decision, the team captain makes the final decision by pressing a button. On accepting, a correct answer anywhere on the list is worth 10 points; but if the answer is the #1 answer, it's worth 50 points; but if the answer is not on the list, no points are awarded.

On a challenge, if the answer was not on the list, the challengers got 10 points times the number of answers unrevealed (ex: if four answers were not yet revealed, the challenge would be worth 40 points) for a successful challenge; but if the answer was on the list, the challenged team gets the points; they also win 40 bonus points in addition to the challenge points if the answer was number one.

An unlimited number of questions were played according to time, and the team with the most points at the sound of the cuckoo won the game and a Kenwood stereo plus a $500 shopping spree at Borders. The losing team received a $250 Gift Certificate Signals Catalog plus $500 in Microsoft merchandise.

If both teams were tied at the end of the third round, one final list was played where the teams rang in using their green buttons. If the first player to ring in gave the #1 answer their team won automatically; otherwise the members of the opposing team gave another answer. The team that gave the higher answer on the list won.

=== The Bonus Round ===
In the bonus round, the team must answer 6 two-part questions within 60 seconds. For each question, each player supplies one answer. If either one doesn't know an answer, he/she can pass; both players must give a correct answer to the question to get credit. If they can answer six questions before time expires (signaled by a higher-pitched cuckoo and truck horn sound, followed by the "foghorn" [see below]), they each win a $2,500 Keystone America mutual fund.

== Cancellation ==
Think Twice was cancelled after only 12 episodes due to low ratings.
