= Claudia Roden =

British writer and cultural anthropologist (born 1936)

Claudia Roden CBE FRSL
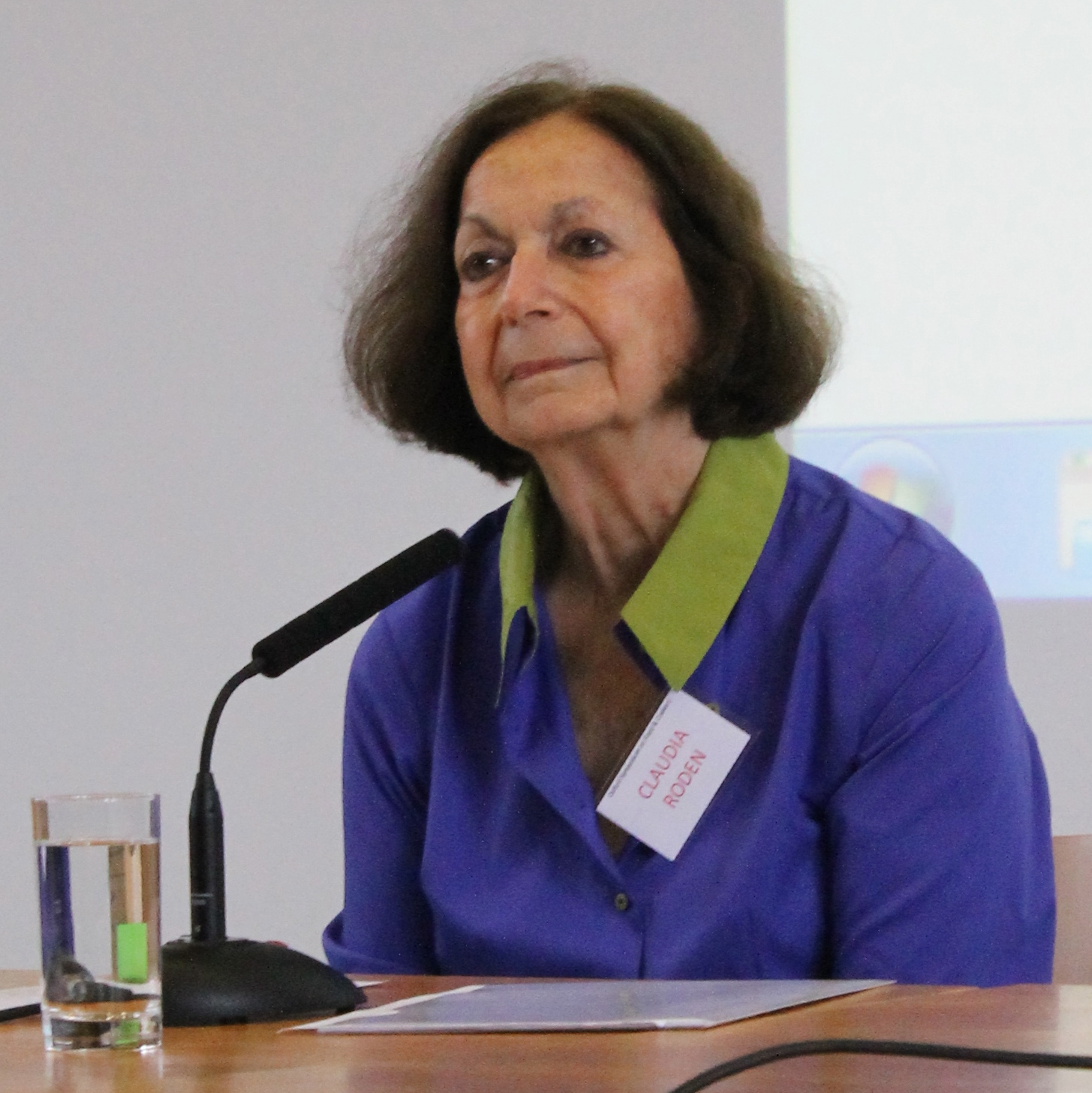
- Roden in 2012
- Born: Claudia Douek; 1936 (age 89–90); Cairo, Egypt
- Occupations: Cookbook writer and cultural anthropologist
- Spouse: Paul Roden (divorced)
- Children: 3
- Relatives: Ellis Douek (brother)

Claudia Roden CBE FRSL (née Douek; born 1936) is an Egyptian-born British cookbook writer and cultural anthropologist of Sephardi/Mizrahi descent. She is best known as the author of Middle Eastern cookbooks including A Book of Middle Eastern Food, The New Book of Middle Eastern Food and Arabesque—Sumptuous Food from Morocco, Turkey and Lebanon.

== Early life ==
Roden was born in 1936 in Cairo, Kingdom of Egypt, the daughter of Cesar Elie Douek and his wife Nelly Sassoon. Her parents were from prominent Syrian-Jewish merchant families who migrated from Aleppo in the previous century; she grew up in Zamalek, Cairo, with two brothers, the surgeon Ellis Douek, and Zaki Douek.

She was Egypt's national backstroke swimming champion at the age of 15.

In 1951 Roden moved to Paris and went to boarding school for three years. In 1954 she moved to London where she studied painting at St. Martin's School of Art. She shared a flat with her brothers Ellis Douek and Zaki Douek. In the London flat Roden, while preparing the meals for her brothers, started to experiment with cooking. She remembered family recipes from Alphandary, pies with aubergine and spinach, and mint and lamb. Both were foods not often cooked in London in that period and so finding ingredients in London was an adventure.

She did not return to Egypt for a quarter of a century, well after her family and most of Cairo's Jewish community had been expelled; many of her books reflect her longing for the close communal culture that was lost, especially as expressed in the culinary arts and social occasions associated with them.

== Career ==
Her first cookbook, A Book of Middle Eastern Food, was published in 1968, and issued in the US in 1972. It presented the cuisine of her childhood in Egypt to a Western audience unfamiliar with Middle Eastern food. The book, which has been updated several times, has influenced food writers and chefs such as Yotam Ottolenghi and Melissa Clark, who have credited her with playing a large role in introducing the food of Egypt in particular and the Middle East in general to Britain and the United States. Paul Levy classes her with such other food writers as Elizabeth David, Julia Child, Jane Grigson, and Sri Owen who, from the 1950s on, "deepened the conversation around food to address questions of culture, context, history and identity." Her many cookbooks, Clark writes, have "produced a genre of works that is at once literary and deeply researched while still being, at heart, practical manuals on how to make delicious meals."

Besides her numerous cookery volumes, Roden has also worked as a food writer and a cooking show presenter for the BBC.

== Roles ==
- President (previously co-chair) of the Oxford Symposium on Food and Cookery (2012 – present)
- Honorary Fellow of University College London (2008)
- Visiting Fellow Yale University, USA (2010 – 2011)
- Honorary Fellow of the School of Oriental and African Studies (2012)

== Personal life ==
In 1959, she married Paul Roden, a clothes importer, and they separated after 15 years. They had three children.

She has lived in Hampstead Garden Suburb since the early 1970s.

== Activities and awards ==
- 1997 - The National Jewish Book Award in the Sephardic and Ashkenazic Culture and Customs category for The Book of Jewish Food
- Roden is a Patron of London-based HIV charity The Food Chain.
- 1999 - Prince Claus Award "in recognition of her exceptional initiatives and achievements in the field of culture." from the Prince Claus Fund, an international culture and development organisation based in Amsterdam.
- 2005 - André Simon Memorial Fund Food Book Prize for non-fiction for The Book of Jewish Food.
- 2005 - Glenfiddich Best Food Book award for Arabesque.
- 2019 : Observer Food Monthly Awards: Lifetime achievement
- 2022 - Roden was appointed Commander of the Order of the British Empire (CBE) in the 2022 New Year Honours for services to food culture.
- 2026 - elected a Fellow of the Royal Society of Literature (FRSL)

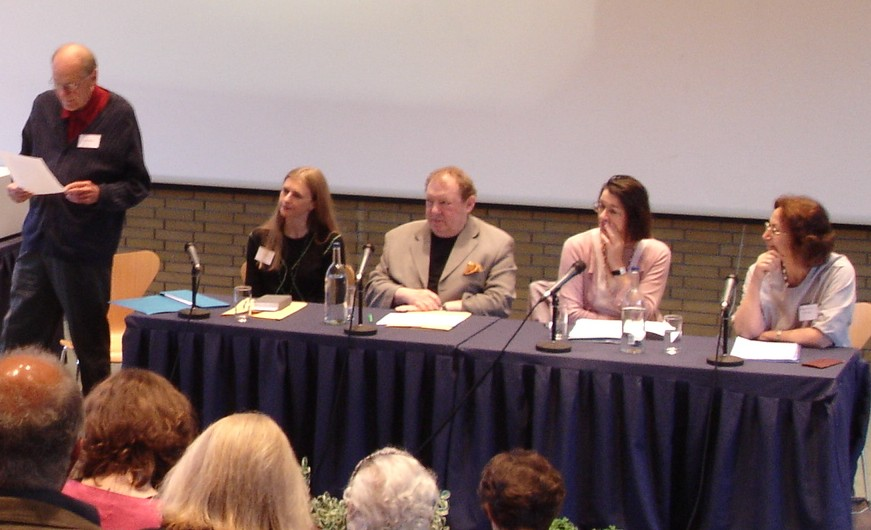
Claudia Roden (right) and Paul Levy (centre) among panellists at the Oxford Symposium, 2006

== Publications ==
- 1968: A Book of Middle Eastern Food, ISBN 978-0-394-71948-1 (reprint)
- 1970: A New Book of Middle Eastern Food, ISBN 978-0-14-046588-4 (reprint)
- 1978 Coffee, (Faber & Faber 1978) New updated edition Pavilion (1994) ISBN 978-1-85793-341-3
- 1981: Picnic: The Complete Guide to Outdoor Food, ISBN 978-0-14-046920-2 (reprint)
- 1986: Middle Eastern Cooking, ISBN 0-7445-0653-0
- 1987: Mediterranean Cookery, accompanied The BBC TV series (BBC Books 1987, newly enlarged edition Penguin Classic 1998) ISBN 978-0-14-027278-9 (reprint)
- 1990: The Food of Italy, ISBN 978-0-09-927325-7 (reprint)
- 1992: Claudia Roden's Invitation to Mediterranean Cooking: 150 Vegetarian and Seafood Recipes, ISBN 978-0-330-39169-6 (reprint)
- 1995: Everything Tastes Better Outdoors, ISBN 0-517-12234-0 (reprint)
- 1996: The Book of Jewish Food: An Odyssey from Samarkand and Vilna to the Present Day, ISBN 978-0-14-046609-6 (reprint)
- 1999: Coffee: A Connoisseur's Companion, ISBN 978-1-86205-283-3
- 1999: Tamarind and Saffron: Favourite Recipes from the Middle East, ISBN 978-0-14-046694-2 (reprint)
- 2000: The New Book of Middle Eastern Food, ISBN 0-375-40506-2
- 2001: Picnics: And Other Outdoor Feasts, ISBN 978-1-904943-17-4 (reprint)
- 2003: Claudia Roden's Foolproof Mediterranean Cooking, ISBN 978-0-563-53496-9
- 2003: Foreword to Traditional Moroccan Cooking by Madame Guinaudeau, ISBN 1-897959-43-5 (reprint)
- 2004: The Arab-Israeli Cookbook: The Recipes, with Robin Soans, ISBN 978-0-9515877-5-1
- 2005: Arabesque - Sumptuous Food from Morocco, Turkey and Lebanon, ISBN 978-0-7181-4581-1
- 2006: Arabesque: A Taste of Morocco, Turkey, and Lebanon, ISBN 978-0-307-26498-5
- 2007: Simple Mediterranean Cookery, ISBN 978-0-563-49327-3
- 2011: The Food of Spain, ISBN 978-0-06-196962-1
- 2021: Claudia Roden’s Mediterranean, ISBN 978-1-9848-5974-7
