= Negro String Quartet =

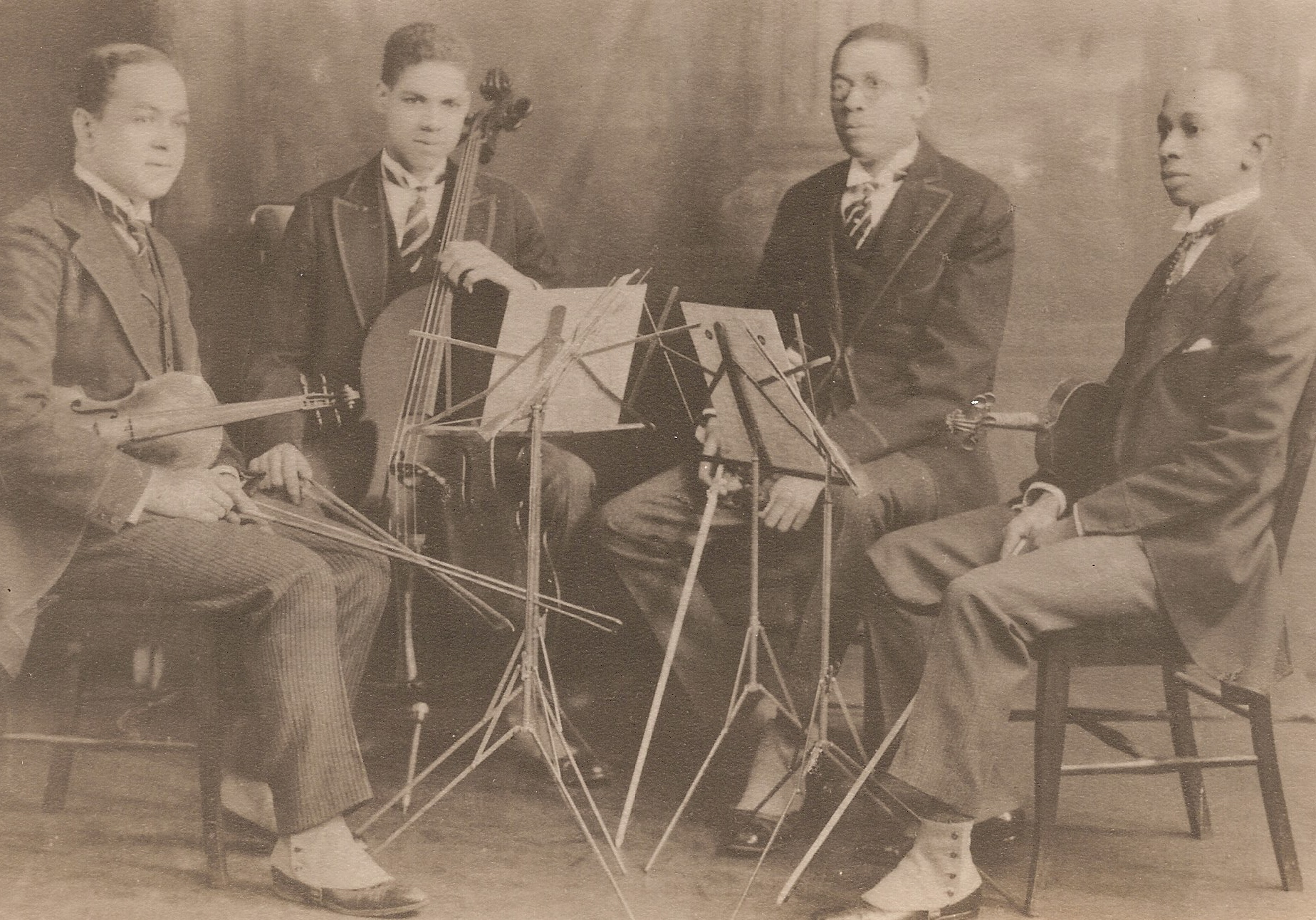
- Weir, Cumbo, Johnson, Boyd

Background information
- Years active: 1920–1933

The Negro String Quartet was a combo that performed in the early 20th century, mainly in churches, community organizations and college venues in New York City. The group was founded by violinist Felix Weir and was active between 1920 and 1933.

== History ==
The quartet was founded by Weir who toured widely in the early 20th century in duet with cellist Leonard Jeter. The pair expanded with the addition of Jeter's sister Olyve at piano. In 1914 Weir and Jeter expanded once again and formed the American String Quartet by dropping pianist Olyve and adding violinists Joseph Lymos and Hall Johnson. Weir made additional changes in 1920. He renamed the group the Negro String Quartet and replaced Jeter with cellist Marion Cumbo, Lymos with first violinist Arthur Boyd and Johnson became the quartet's viola player.

== Noted performance ==
The high point of the group's existence came November 27, 1925, when the Negro String Quartet appeared in concert at New York's Carnegie Hall with renowned singer Roland Hayes. The performance drew praise from New York Times music critic Olin Downes who described the program of classical works and traditional Negro spirituals as coming together "in the presence of a common ideal of beauty," to which the audience that had packed the hall "listened with unusual intentness and applauded with discriminating enthusiasm."
