= Saviour Cumbo =

- Born: 1810; Valletta, Malta
- Died: 1877; Malta
- Occupation: Philosophy

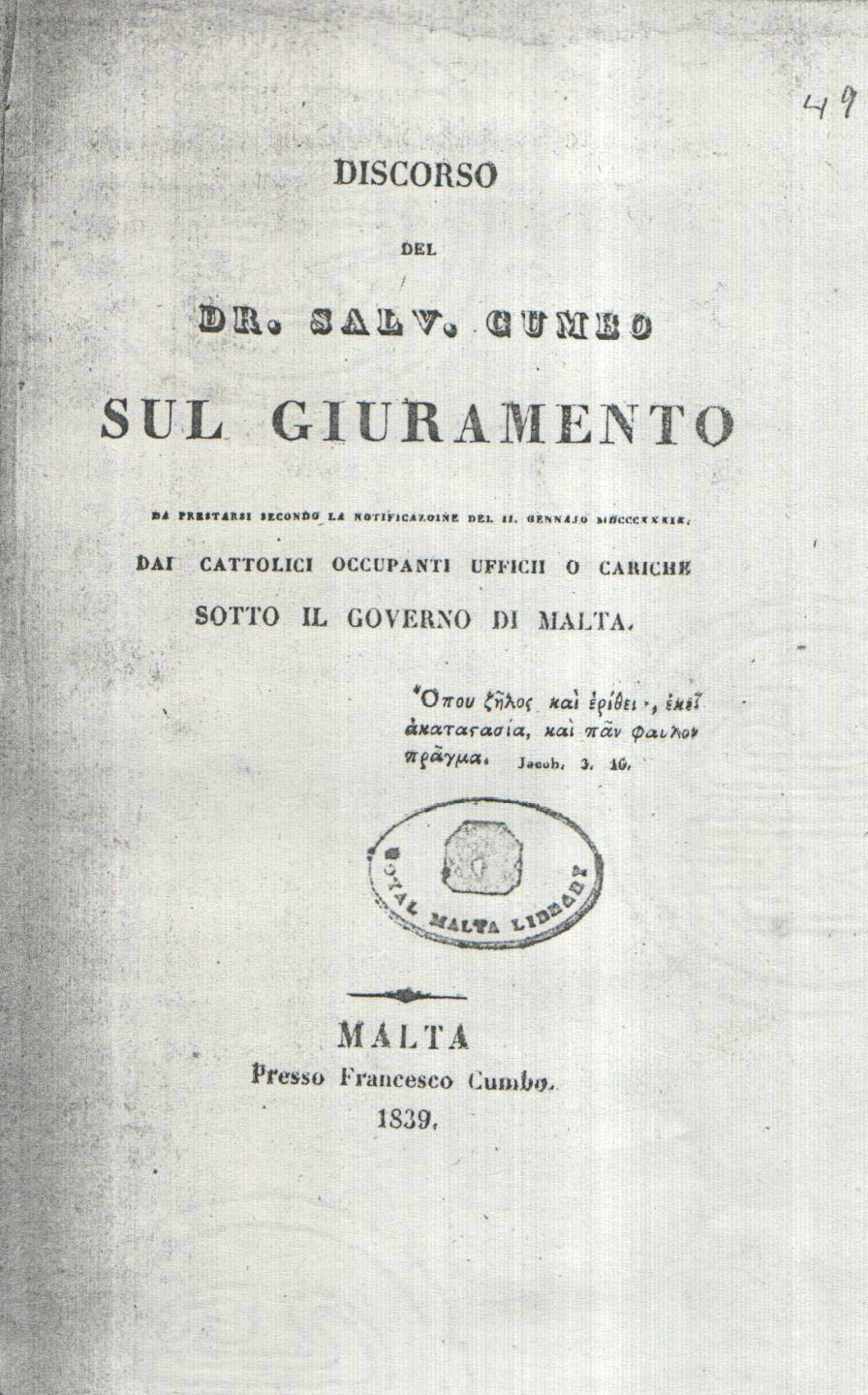
Sul Giuramento (1839) of Saviour Cumbo

Saviour Cumbo (1810–1877) was a Maltese theologian and minor philosopher. His philosophical writings deal mainly with the relationship between reason and faith. Though his engagement with philosophical reflection was peripheral, his contribution in this field was at least interesting and at most insightful. No portrait of him has been identified up till now.

== Life ==
Cumbo was born at Valletta, Malta, in 1810. After entering the diocesan seminary and becoming a priest, he was entrusted with various administrative offices within the diocese of Malta. For many years he was the Vicar-General of the bishop. Concurrently, he taught theology at the University of Malta.

In 1839, he began a periodical called Il Filologo (The Philologist), which was of a literary nature. He issued the periodical for three years. Furthermore, he published various booklets of general public interest. Cumbo died in 1877.

== Works ==
Though Cumbo published profusely, mainly booklets of a few pages, a few of his publications have some philosophical interest, namely:

- 1839 - Piano di Pubblica Instruzione (A Plan for Public Education). Published in Malta (Torchi di Francesco Cumbo), this 48-page book in Italian proposes a plan for public education of every level. The work begins with a preface and an introduction, and then is divided into three main chapters (with the last two sub-divided into 11 and 9 parts respectively.

When speaking of university, Cumbo suggests that students should be given "a deep knowledge of philosophy". In a more concrete manner, he proposes six Chairs: for logic and metaphysics, simple mathematics, pure mathematics, mathematical physics, experimental physics, and maritime studies. For experimental physics, Cumbo suggests building state-of-the-art laboratories.

While proposing his plan, Cumbo takes the opportunity to criticize the current course of philosophy at the University of Malta. He objects to the fact that the course includes Latin, Italian, and English literature, and also economic politics (which he finds "incompatible" with philosophy).

- 1839 - Sul Giuramento (On the Pledge). This 19-page booklet in Italian published in Malta (by Francesco Cumbo), reproduces a speech which Cumbo gave in 1838 to civil servants. The central part of the address deals with the problem encountered by Catholic workers who solemnly pledged their loyalty to a Protestant government (since at the time Malta was under British colonial rule). Though the local authorities of the Catholic Church had declared immoral such a pledge, Cumbo ventures to state in clear terms that it is not so. This irked the local bishop, who accused Cumbo of heresy before the Holy See in Rome. In response, Cumbo wrote Il Trenta Gennajo (below).
- 1839 - Il Trenta Gennajo (30 January). A 19-page essay in Italian written by Cumbo and published in Malta (by Francesco Cumbo) in response to the accusations of heresy leveled against him after publishing the tract Sul Giuramento (above). Cumbo had appeared before the Holy See in Rome on 30 January 1839, hence the title of the booklet. The meeting left Cumbo disappointed. So much so that he then decided to publish this short pamphlet, which eventually he had to issue various editions of it. The writing is a lengthy address to the Bishop of Malta, Francis Saverio Caruana, in which he explains the nature of the issue at hand (that is, on the pledge of Catholic civil servants in Protestant Malta) and describes, point by point, why he had declared it morally acceptable.
- 1839 - Necessità delle Rivelazione per Guida dei Costumi (The Need of Revelation as a Guide to Behaviour). A 20-page pamphlet in Italian (published by the Tipografia Cumbo, Malta) reproduces an address given in 1839 by Cumbo at the Gioventù Maltese delle Sacre Scienze (Maltese Youth of Sacred Sciences). Cumbo examines the relationship between reason and faith. He does this with the issue of civil servants' pledge (see Il Giuramento and Il Trenta Gennajo above) at the back of his mind.
- 1839 - Breve Cenno Sulle Lezioni Scritturali (A Brief Note on Lectures of Scripture). Published in Malta (Tipografia Cumbo), this 16-page pamphlet in Italian is a discussion on some aspects of the lectures given at the University of Malta on the Bible. With his typical passion and analysis, Cumbo makes a philosophical discussion on the relationship of reason to faith.
- 1844 - Influenze del Cristianesimo sul Progresso delle Scienze (Influences of Christianity on the Progress of the Sciences). A 36-page book in Italian published in Malta (Tipografia di Francesco Cumbo) and dedicated to Cardinal Charles Januarius Acton. It reproduces an address given by Cumbo on 1 October 1844, in Valletta at the official opening of the academic year 1844-45 of the University of Malta. The work is divided into an introduction and another eleven main parts. Cumbo concentrates on the literary wealth of humanity, and philosophically discusses our relation to it and our appraisal of it.
- 1874 - De Laudibus Sancti Thomæ (In Praise of Saint Thomas Aquinas). This 6-page leaflet in Italian published in Malta reproduces an address given by Cumbo at the Dominican priory at Valletta. The initiative to publish the address was taken by Cumbo's students (called 'discipulorum', disciples). The work is a rhetorical speech on Thomas Aquinas. Though containing some philosophical interest, the address is mainly oratorical.
- 1872 - Elogio Funebre al Dr. Giorgio Caruana (Funeral Oration for Dr. George Caruana). The oration contained in this 21-page pamphlet in Italian (published at the Tipografia Strada San Domenico No. 75, Valletta), was delivered in May 1872 at the funeral of George Caruana. It is the work of a philosopher paying homage to another philosopher. Considering the occasion, no substantial philosophical material is to be found in this oration. Nevertheless, Cumbo does not deal superficially with the themes of life and death which he addresses.

== See also ==
- Philosophy in Malta
