= Marion Cumbo =

American cellist

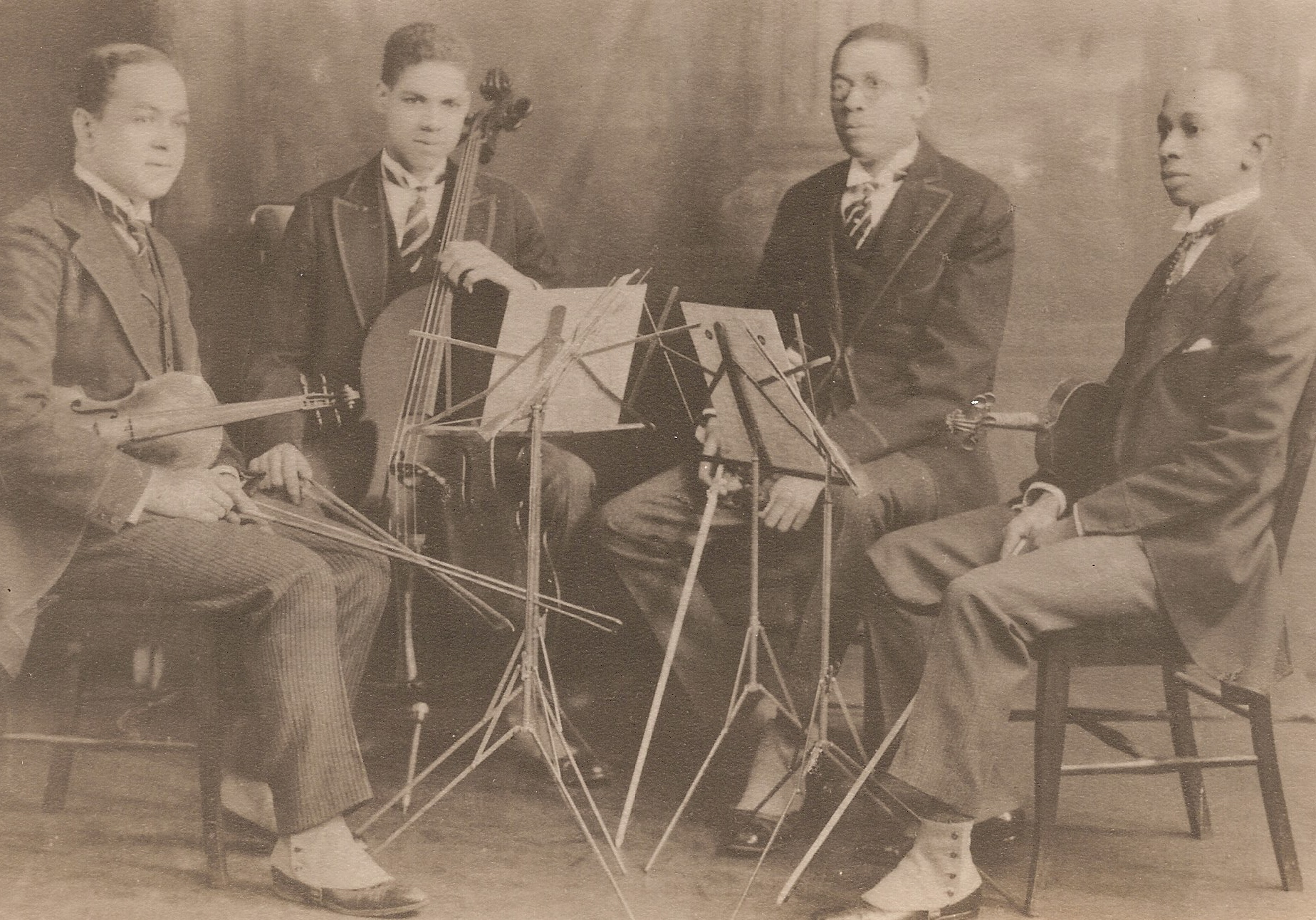
- Marion Cumbo (2nd from left) c.1920

Marion Cumbo (March 1, 1899 – September 17, 1990) was a cellist who was a member of the Negro String Quartet and the American String Quartet. He was married to Clarissa Cumbo.

== Early life ==
Marion Cumbo was born on March 1, 1899, to unknown parents. He grew up in orphanages in New York City alongside his brother, Earle. He was educated in New York City public schools, where his musical talent was discovered, leading to him being offered a slot at the Martin-Smith School of Music leading to his education there, culminating in his becoming a protégé to Minnie Brown. Later, he attended the Institute of Musical Art (now the Juilliard School) which he paid for by performing.

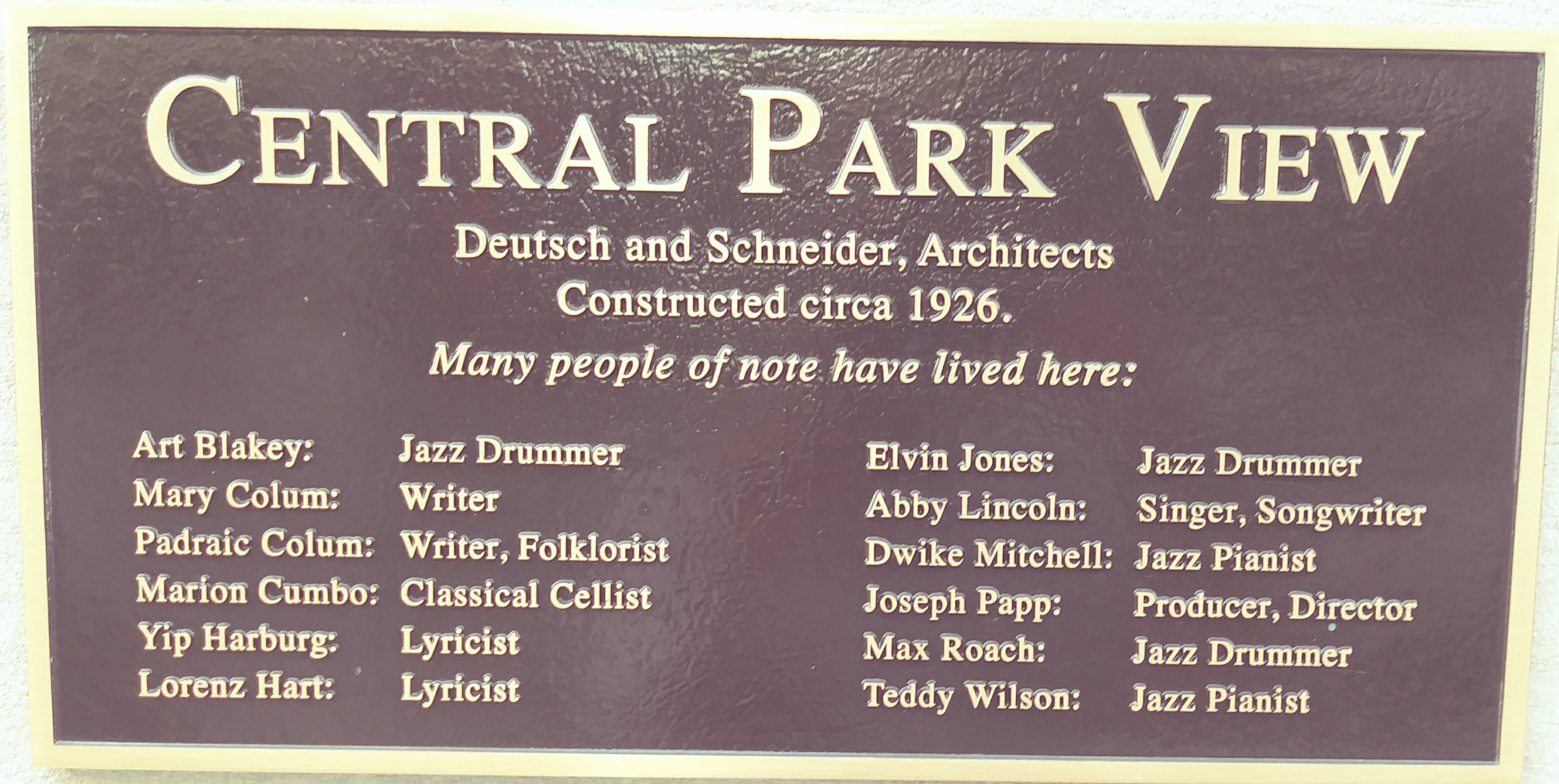
Plaque on his apartment building listing Cumbo as one of the "people of note" who have lived there
