= Shelton Hale Bishop =

- Born: 1889; New York City, United States
- Died: August 25, 1962
- Occupation: Episcopal minister

The Reverend Shelton Hale Bishop (1889 – 25 August 1962, aged 73) was an Episcopal priest who spent most of his career in New York City. He was rector of St. Philip's Episcopal Church in Harlem from 1933 to 1957. His father, Hutchens Chew Bishop, served as rector of the same church from 1886 to 1933.

At age seven, Bishop entered the service of St. Philip's as an acolyte. After receiving his Bachelor of Arts degree from Columbia University in 1911 and graduating from General Theological Seminary, he was ordained deacon in 1914. He then became curate at St. Thomas' Church, Chicago, where he was ordained to the priesthood a year later. From 1916 to 1923, he was rector of Church of the Holy Cross in Pittsburgh, Pennsylvania. He then returned to New York City to serve as assistant to his father at St. Philip's, where he supervised religious education and youth work, eventually succeeding his father as rector in 1933.

In 1944, Father Bishop persuaded the parishioners of St. Philip's to convert a four-story parish house into a community center with recreational facilities. Crowds of children jammed into the facility's gym, which also provided recreation supervisors who cared about them. Bishop realized that only the city could provide Harlem children with facilities at the scale needed to give them any alternatives aside from roaming the streets while their parents were out working. Such alternatives already existed in more high-rent neighborhoods; during the 1930s, Robert Moses built 255 playgrounds in New York City, and only one was in Harlem. Bishop tried to persuade Moses for ten years to build a playground in his neighborhood and advocated for the cause, at one point telling an audience, "The children have no place to go. Day and night they must use the block on which they live for recreation. No wonder they are like caged tigers and, once loose, want to wreak havoc."

In 1957, Bishop retired and relocated to Hawaii, where he became involved in local church activities.
