= Manhattan Avenue (Manhattan) =

Avenue in Manhattan, New York

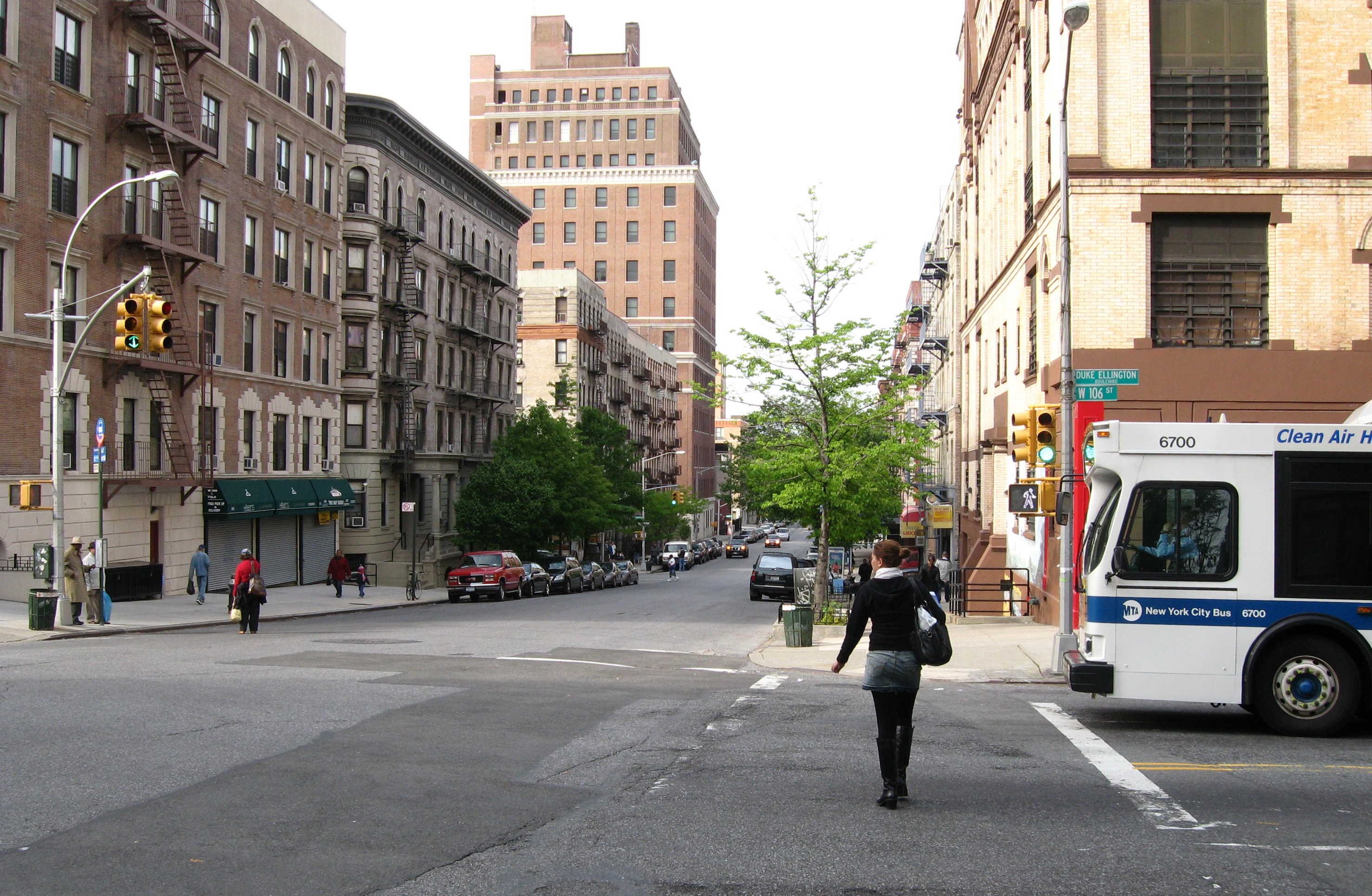
Manhattan Avenue and 106th Street, looking north.

Manhattan Avenue is a street in the Manhattan Valley neighborhood of Manhattan in New York City, extending from 100th Street to 124th Street. Not included in the original Commissioners' Plan of 1811, it is parallel to Columbus Avenue to the west and Central Park West/Frederick Douglass Boulevard to the east.

The avenue saw its first buildings in 1885, a group of row houses on its western side. These buildings were brick with stone and terra-cotta trim.

There are two historic districts on this avenue. Manhattan Avenue between West 120th and 123rd Streets was designated a National Historic District in 1992. The Manhattan Avenue–West 120th–123rd Streets Historic District lies on the western edge of Central Harlem. It is composed of 113 contributing brownstone and brick row houses on four short blocks between 120th and 123rd streets bounded by Morningside and Manhattan Avenues. Additionally, a Manhattan Avenue Historic District between West 105th & West 106th Streets, including 101-137 and 120-140 Manhattan Avenue was designated by the New York City Landmarks Preservation Commission on May 15, 2007.
