= Fifth and Madison Avenues buses =

Bus routes in Manhattan, New York

m1, m2, m3, m4 m1, m2, m4
- Fifth and Madison Avenues Line
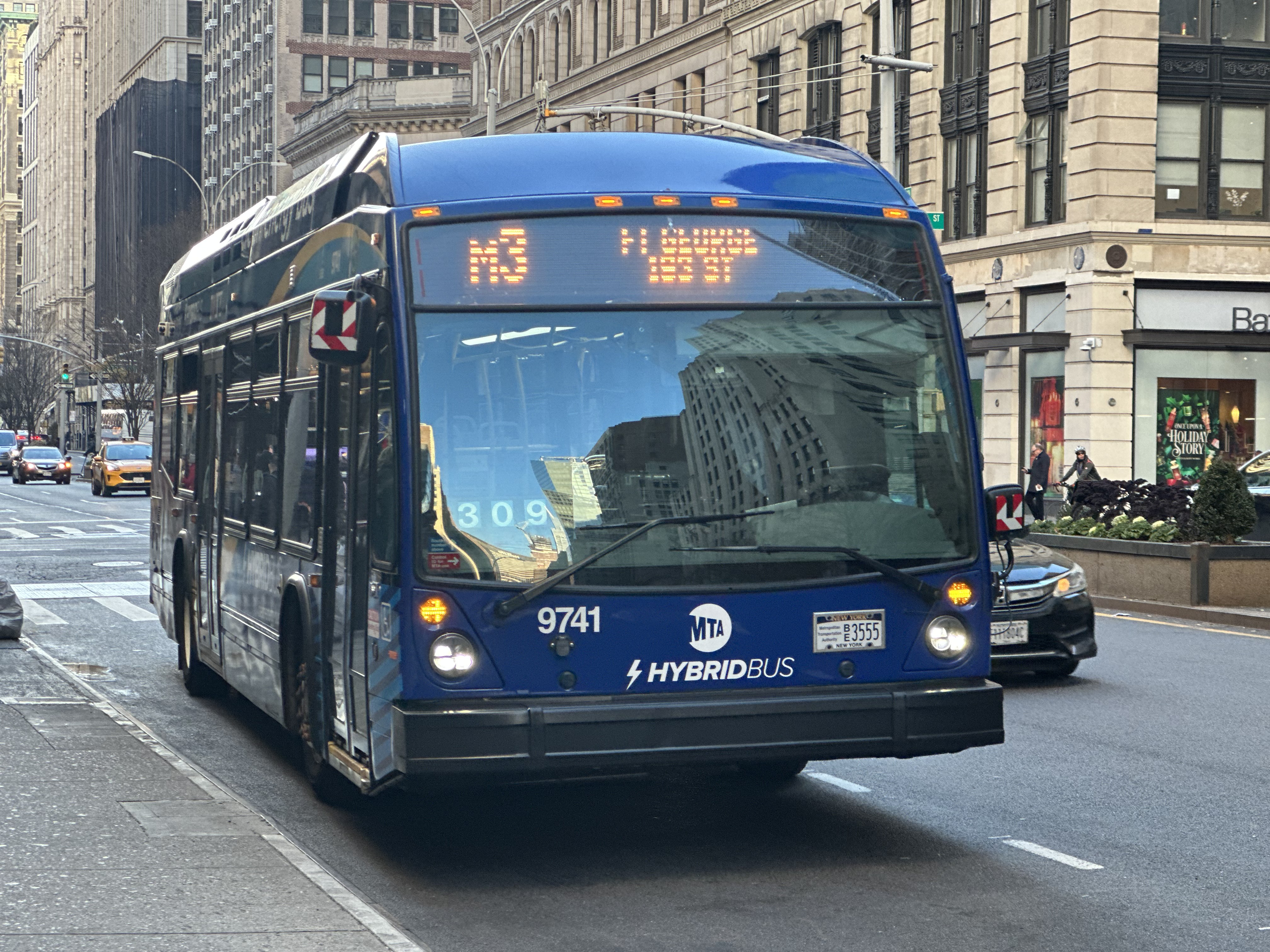
- A 2021 Nova Bus LFS HEV (9741) on the Fort George-bound M3 in 2023.

Overview
- System: MTA Regional Bus Operations
- Operator: Manhattan and Bronx Surface Transit Operating Authority
- Garage: Mother Clara Hale Depot (M1); Manhattanville Depot (M2, M3, M4)
- Vehicle: New Flyer Xcelsior XDE40; Nova Bus LFS HEV (except M1); Orion VII NG HEV (except M1)
- Began service: 1832 (trolley); 1886 (bus); 1966 (current alignment)

Route
- Locale: Manhattan, New York, U.S.
- Start: M1: SoHo – Grand Street; M2-M3: East Village – 8th Street; M4: Midtown – 5th Avenue-32nd Street
- Via: Madison Avenue (northbound); Fifth Avenue (southbound); 110th Street (except M1)
- End: M1: Harlem – 147th Street; M2: Washington Heights – 168th Street; M3: Fort George – 193rd Street; M4: Fort Tryon Park – The Cloisters
- Length: M1 SB: 8.5 miles (13.7 km); M2 SB: 9.3 miles (15.0 km); M3 SB: 10.6 miles (17.1 km); M4 SB: 9.8 miles (15.8 km)
- Other routes: Q32 (Midtown – Jackson Heights via Roosevelt Avenue); M98 3rd/Lexington Avs/Washington Heights; M101 3rd/Lexington/Amsterdam Avs/125th St; M102 3rd/Lexington/Lenox Avs; M103 3rd/Lexington Avs/Bowery

Service
- Operates: 24 hours (M2); 4:50 AM–12:50 AM (M1); 5:40 AM–12:00 AM (M3); 5:35 AM–11:20 PM (M4)
- Ridership: 2,666,596 (M1, 2025); 2,234,550 (M2, 2025); 3,163,778 (M3, 2025); 3,801,278 (M4, 2025)
- Transfers: Yes
- Timetable: M1 M2 M3 M4

The M1, M2, M3, and M4 are four local bus routes that operate along the one-way pair of Madison and Fifth Avenues in the borough of Manhattan in New York City between Greenwich Village and Harlem.

The routes are the successors to the New York and Harlem Railroad's Fourth and Madison Avenues Line, which began operations in 1832 as the first street railway in the world, and several lines of the Fifth Avenue Coach Company, a bus operator that started running on Fifth Avenue in 1886.

== Description ==
The M1, M2, M3, and M4 all run between Midtown or Lower Manhattan and Upper Manhattan, while the Q32 runs from Midtown north along Fifth and Madison Avenues and east over the Queensboro Bridge to Jackson Heights, Queens. The M4 terminates and originates near 32nd Street, while the Q32 begins at Penn Station, joining Madison Avenue at 32nd Street (northbound) and leaving Fifth Avenue at 37th Street (southbound). Thus, all four routes are on Fifth and Madison Avenues from 34th Street to 110th Street.

=== M1 ===
A 2021 XDE40 (9471) on the Harlem-bound M1

The M1 begins its route in SoHo at the intersection of Centre Street and Grand Street. It continues up Centre and Lafayette Streets, then 4th Avenue to Union Square, where it changes names to Union Square East. Union Square East continues past Union Square as Park Avenue South. The M1 turns off Park Avenue South at East 25th Street for one block, and then immediately turns right onto Madison Avenue. The M1 follows Madison Avenue all the way to East 135th Street, where it again turns left for one block, and then immediately turns right onto Fifth Avenue (becoming a two-way at this point). It travels up Fifth to West 139th Street, turns left for a block, and turns right onto Lenox Avenue to its terminus at 148th Street. The M1 travels south the same route, but entirely on Fifth Avenue between 139th Street and 8th Street (except for a short deviation around Marcus Garvey Park at 124th Street), then on Broadway from 8th Street to Grand Street.

During weekdays, every other southbound trip terminates in East Village, Manhattan, using 8th Street (St. Marks Place) to travel between 5th and 4th Avenues. All trips run to/from Grand Street on weekends. Some southbound trips may terminate at 5th Avenue and 42nd Street.

The M1 has a peak direction limited stop service on weekday rush hours, running to/from Grand Street and making limited stops between 8th Street and 110th Street. While the limited is running, local trips run to/from 8th Street; it is local at all other times.

=== M2 ===
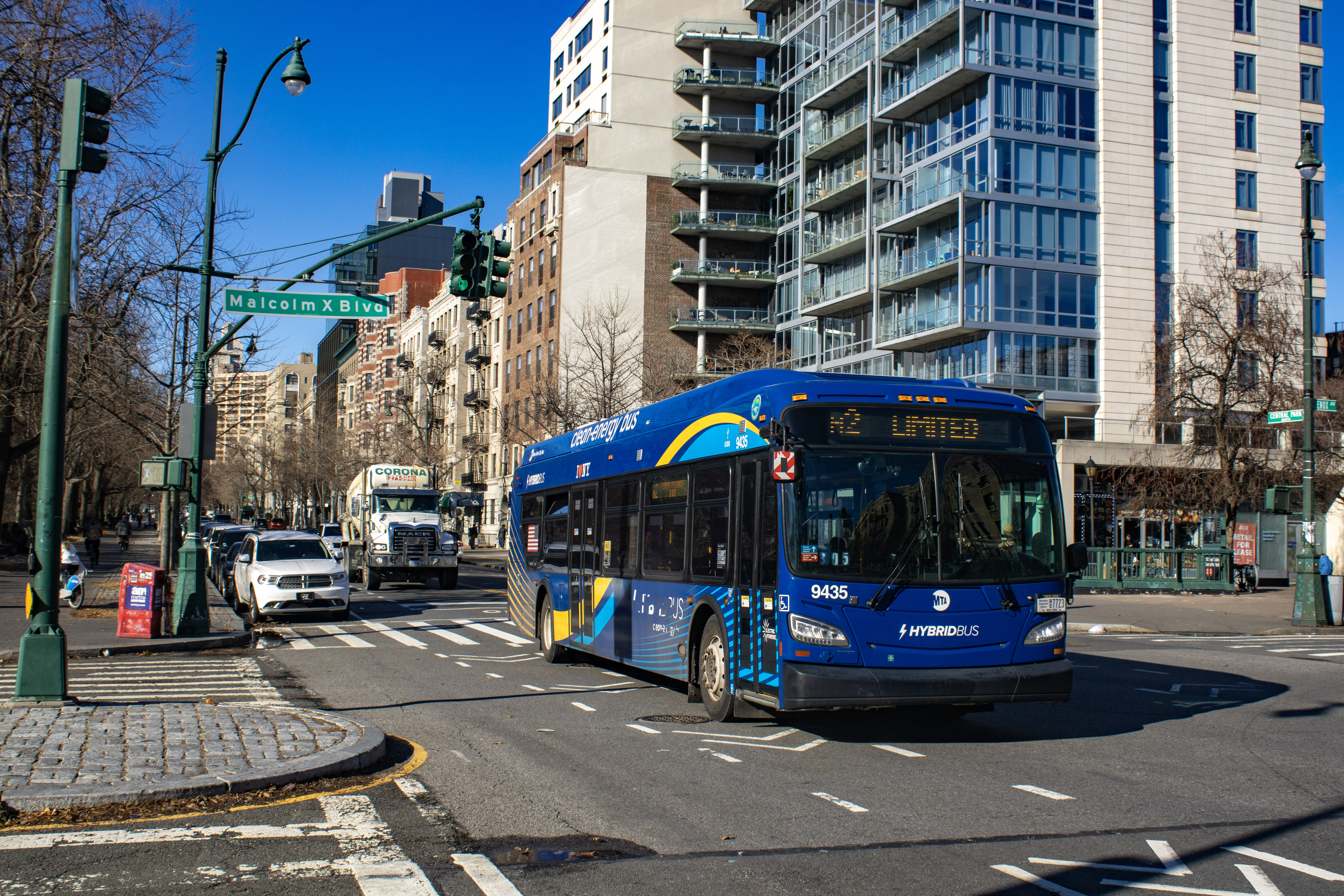
A 2021-2022 XDE40 (9435) on the East Village-bound M2 Limited at Central Park North/Lenox Avenue

The M2 follows the same route as the M1 north until East 110th Street, where it turns west. It travels around Duke Ellington Circle and along Central Park North to Adam Clayton Powell Jr. Boulevard and turns right (north). The M2 follows 7th Avenue (as it is locally known) until West 155th Street, where it turns left and then turns right onto Edgecombe Avenue. The M2 follows Edgecombe Avenue to West 165th Street, and terminates at West 168th Street and Audubon Avenue. It follows the same route south, except using Fifth Avenue instead of Madison.

The M2 also has a limited-stop variant, making limited stops south of 110th Street with no local service during the daytime. At other times, it runs local only. Some northbound buses may terminate at 7th Avenue and 145th Street.

=== M3 ===
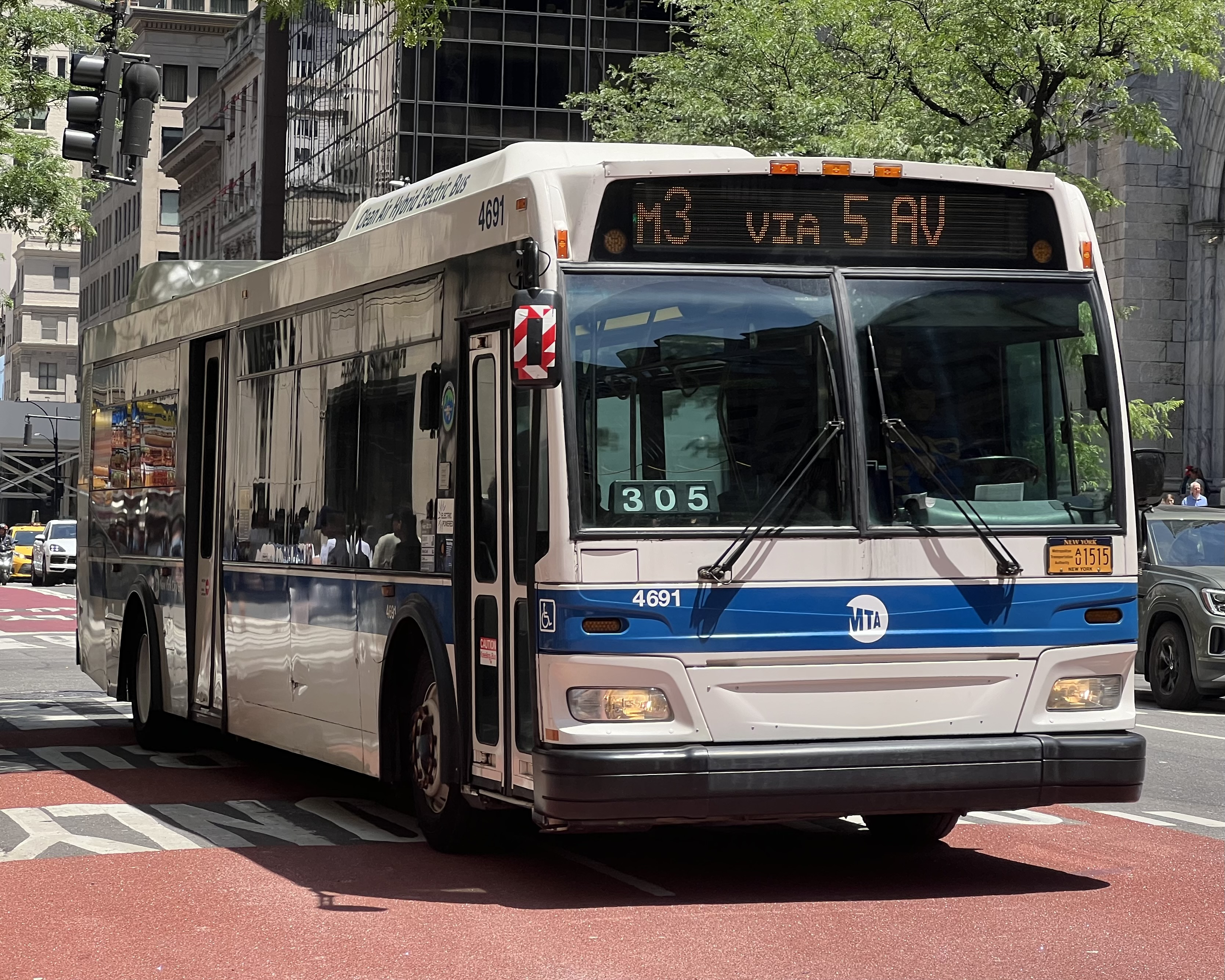
A 2010 Orion VII NG HEV (4691) on the East Village-bound M3 in June 2024

The M3 follows the same route as the M2, except it continues west past Adam Clayton Powell Jr. Boulevard along West 110th Street to Manhattan Avenue. It follows Manhattan Avenue, which becomes St. Nicholas Avenue. At 190th Street, the northbound M3 turns east, then continues north along Amsterdam Avenue to a terminus at St. Nicholas Avenue and West 192nd Street. Southbound buses begin on St. Nicholas Avenue and West 192nd Street and continue down St. Nicholas Avenue, Manhattan Avenue, Central Park North, and Fifth Avenue. During late nights the M3 terminates at St. Nicholas Avenue and West 125th Street.

=== M4 ===
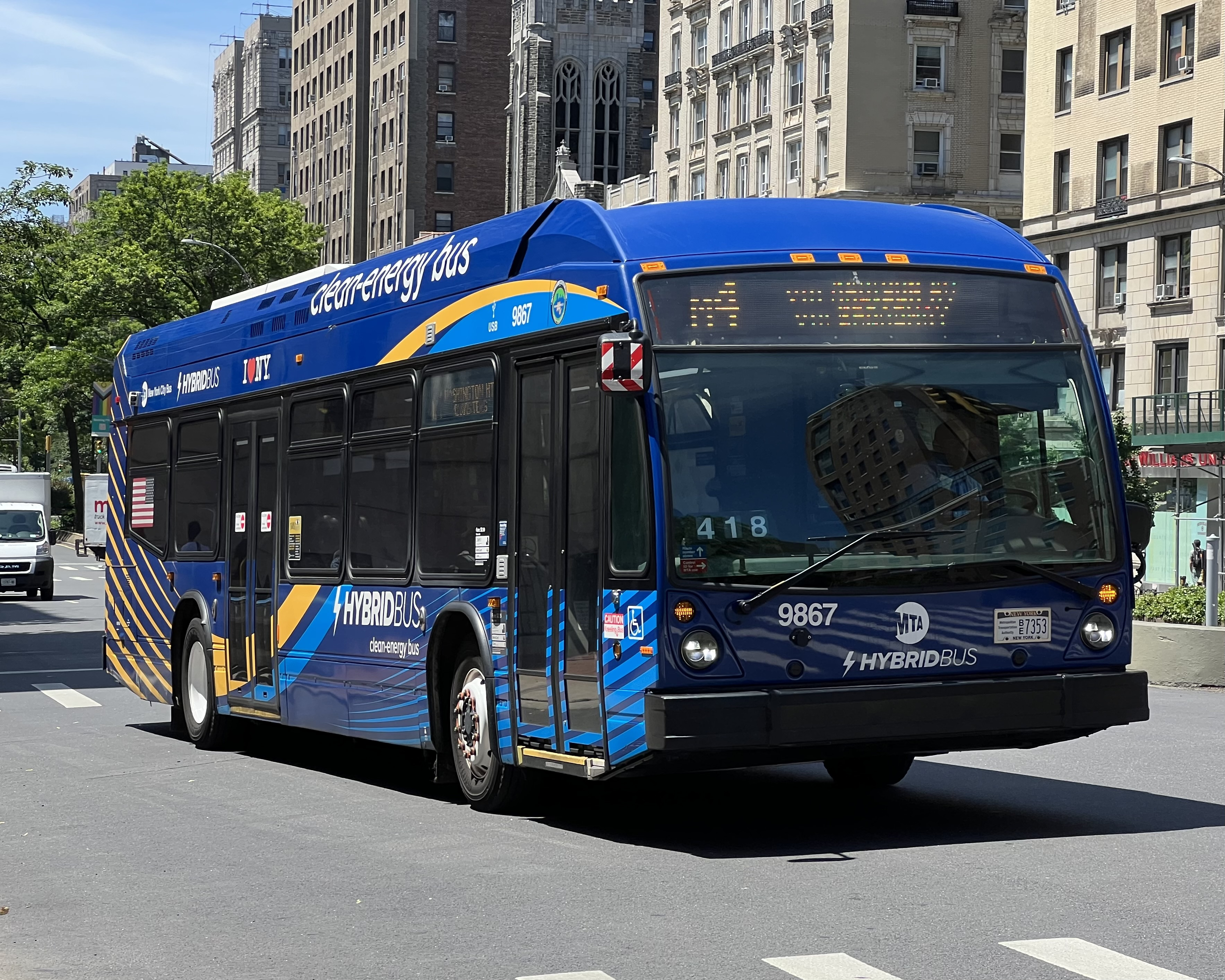
A 2021 Nova Bus LFS HEV (9867) on the Cloisters Museum-bound M4 in June 2024

The M4 begins at the intersection of East 32nd Street and Fifth Avenue in Midtown Manhattan. It turns left onto Madison Avenue and follows the same route as the M3 from here, except it continues west past Manhattan Avenue along West 110th Street, then Cathedral Parkway, to Broadway. The M4 turns north onto Broadway and travels along Broadway to West 165th Street. At 165th Street, the M4 turns left and then immediately turns right onto Fort Washington Avenue. The M4 continues up Fort Washington Avenue to the entrance of Fort Tryon Park. When The Cloisters Museum is open, the M4 continues north along Margaret Corbin Drive to the entrance to the museum.

M4 buses make limited-stops in the peak direction during weekday rush hours (downtown in the morning, uptown in the evening), making limited stops south of 157th Street while also making local stops along 110th Street. Local service runs at all other times. Some northbound buses may terminate at Broadway and 135th Street.

== History ==
=== The Fourth and Madison Avenues Line ===
The New York and Harlem Railroad (NY&H) was the first railroad in Manhattan, opening from City Hall north along Centre Street, Broome Street (northbound trains were later moved to Grand Street), the Bowery, Fourth Avenue, and Park Avenue to Harlem in the 1830s, and was extended southwest along Park Row to Broadway in 1852. A branch opened along 42nd Street and Madison Avenue to 73rd Street in 1870, and the NY&H began to operate streetcars along this route; it was later extended to Harlem.

Buses were substituted for streetcars by the Madison Avenue Coach Company in March 1936. The New York City Omnibus Corporation took over operations in 1951, and changed its name to Fifth Avenue Coach Lines in 1956; the Manhattan and Bronx Surface Transit Operating Authority took over operations in 1962.

When the bus that replaced the Lexington and Lenox Avenues Line was terminated, the Madison Avenue bus was extended west on 139th Street and north on Lenox Avenue to 147th Street. When Madison Avenue became one-way northbound, southbound traffic was moved to Fifth Avenue, replacing the original route of the Fifth Avenue Coach Company. The Fifth Avenue Transportation Company (later the Fifth Avenue Coach Company) began operating stages on Fifth Avenue between 11th Street and 59th Street on January 23, 1886. The company was formed because the wealthy residents of Fifth Avenue did not want a street railway. The route was later extended south to Washington Square Park and north to 89th Street, and in 1900 the company was authorized to extend north to 135th Street, and to operate on other streets including 110th Street and Riverside Drive to 124th Street. More extensions, on 32nd Street from Fifth Avenue west to Seventh Avenue (Penn Station) and north from 110th Street on Seventh Avenue and Manhattan Avenue/St. Nicholas Avenue to 155th Street, were soon authorized. After the company's horse cars were replaced with motor buses in July 1907, it began operating these extensions, and assigned them numbers in 1916 or 1917:

1. Fifth Avenue to 135th Street
2. Fifth and Seventh Avenues to Polo Grounds (155th Street and St. Nicholas Place)
3. Fifth and St. Nicholas Avenues to Polo Grounds
4. Fifth Avenue and Riverside Drive via 110th Street to 135th Street and Broadway
5. Fifth Avenue and Riverside Drive via 57th Street to 135th Street and Broadway
6. 72nd Street Crosstown via 57th Street

The Fifth Avenue Coach Company (FACCo) obtained a permit on July 1, 1925, and on July 9 began operating its 15 and 16 routes. The 15 (now the Q32) began at Fifth Avenue and 25th Street at Madison Square Park, and traveled north on Fifth Avenue, east via 57th Street to the Queensboro Bridge, and along Queens Boulevard, Roosevelt Avenue, and 25th Street (now 82nd Street) to Northern Boulevard in Jackson Heights, Queens. The short 16 (Elmhurst Crosstown) was renamed Q89 on July 1, 1974, began at Roosevelt Avenue and 82nd Street and used Baxter Avenue and Broadway to reach Queens Boulevard in Elmhurst.

Even before the Fifth Avenue company began operating its coaches, the New York and Harlem Railroad was operating its Fourth and Madison Avenues Line of horse cars, later trolleys, mainly on Fourth Avenue below and Madison Avenue above 42nd Street (Grand Central Terminal). The Madison Avenue Coach Company, a New York Railways subsidiary, started operating replacement buses on February 1, 1935. Several changes were made to the route: instead of the Bowery, a shorter alignment via Centre Street and Lafayette Street was used, and a variant stayed on Madison Avenue south to 26th Street and short-turned at Astor Place. As part of the New York City Omnibus Corporation system (NYCO; also a New York Railways subsidiary), these two routes were numbered 1 (via Park Avenue) and 2 (short-turn via Madison Avenue).

=== Extensions and combinations ===
On July 17, 1960, Lexington Avenue and Third Avenue became a one-way pair. The NYCO's 4, which had traveled along Lexington Avenue, 116th Street, and Lenox Avenue to northern Harlem, was discontinued. To cover this travel pattern, the 1 was extended west on 135th Street and north on Lenox Avenue, and the 2 was realigned to turn west on 116th Street and north on Lenox Avenue. The path of the 1 and 2 south of Union Square was changed on November 10, 1963, to use Broadway rather than Fourth Avenue and Lafayette Street, due to Lafayette Street becoming one-way northbound and Broadway becoming one-way southbound. On that same day, the southern terminus for FACCo's 2 and 3 was moved to 8th Street and Fourth Avenue, after terminating the prior two months at 8th Street between Fifth Avenue and University Place following a ban on all bus traffic through their prior terminus of Washington Square imposed by the city on September 2, 1963. As part of the new pattern, the 2 and 3 turned at Fourth Avenue onto Wanamaker Place and then onto Fifth Avenue.

Fifth and Madison Avenues became one-way streets on January 14, 1966, and the four FACCo routes on Fifth Avenue past Central Park and the two NYCO routes on Madison Avenue were combined into four routes on both avenues. In particular, the following changes were made:

- The NYCO's 1 and FACCo's 1 were combined. The northbound route of the new 1 followed the old NYCO 1 along Park Avenue, 39th Street, Madison Avenue, 135th Street, and Lenox Avenue, and the southbound route used Lenox Avenue and 135th Street to join the old FACCo 1 at Fifth Avenue. Buses left the old FACCo route at 40th Street, heading south on the old NYCO route on Park Avenue and Broadway.
- The NYCO's 2 and FACCo's 2 (since extended to 168th Street via Edgecombe Avenue) were combined. Again, the southbound route generally followed the FACCo's 2, and the northbound route was the NYCO's 2. North of 110th Street, the combined route had two variants, watching the two divergent routes. One, designated by MaBSTOA as the Seventh Avenue branch (and numbered 2A), followed the FACCo's 2 along 110th Street and Seventh Avenue, continuing along Seventh and Edgecombe Avenues to 168th Street, while the other (designated the Lenox Avenue branch) used 116th Street and Lenox Avenue to 147th Street (NYCO's 2). FACCo's 2 was renamed 2A from 1966 to 1974, while NYCO's 2 had its route south of 116th Street moved to Third Avenue northbound and Lexington Avenue southbound, and its route number changed to 101A, on March 2, 1969 (renumbered M102 on July 1, 1974).
- The FACCo's 3 (since extended to Fort George via St. Nicholas Avenue), 4 (since extended to Fort Tryon Park via Fort Washington Avenue, and ending at Penn Station in the south), and 15 were essentially moved northbound from Fifth Avenue to Madison Avenue south of 110th Street. Where it made a difference, the NYCO's 2 was more closely followed.

The 1 and 4 routes (later the M1 and M4, respectively) were among the first routes to get limited-stop service, in 1973. In 1976, eight double-decker buses were placed into service on the M4 and M5 routes as part of a two-year test. The buses were 14.5 feet (4.4 m) tall, which required the relocation of several traffic lights and removal of tree limbs along the routes.

=== Recent changes ===
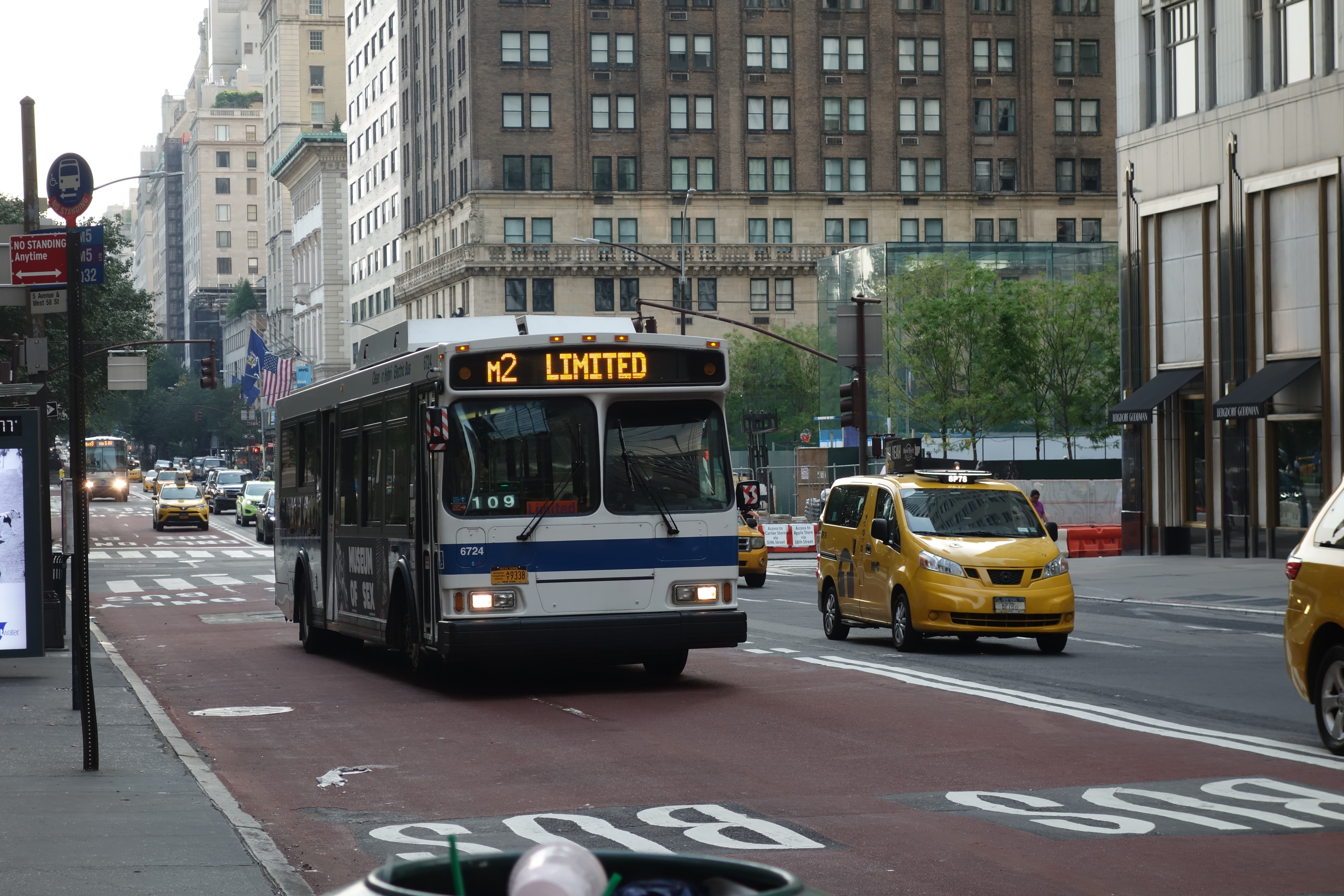
A 2006 Orion VII OG HEV (6724) on the East Village-bound M2 Limited at 57th Street/5th Avenue in August 2018

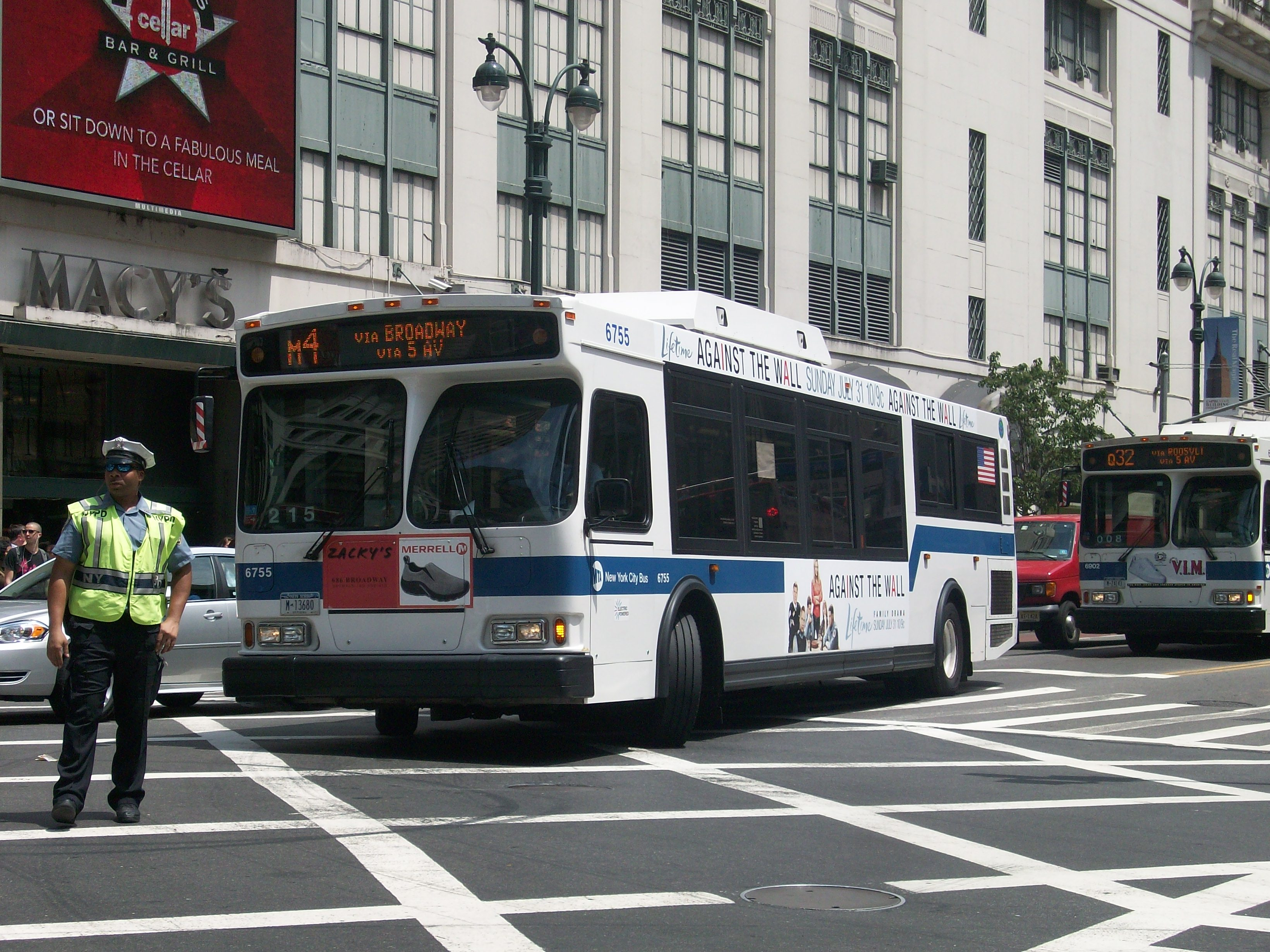
A 2006 Orion VII OG HEV (6755) on the 32nd Street-bound M4 in Midtown along 34th Street in February 2011

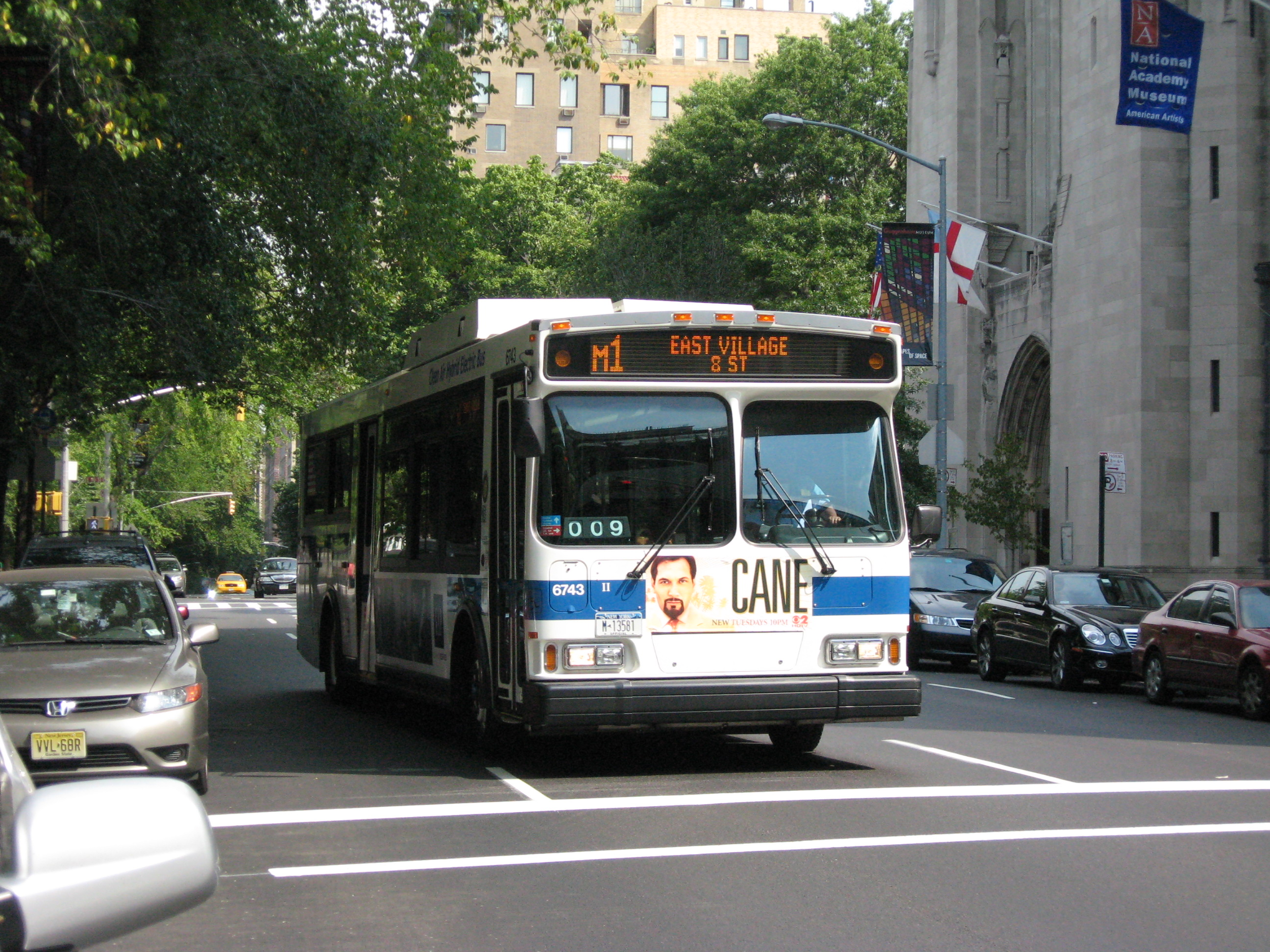
A 2006 Orion VII OG HEV (6743) on the East Village-bound M1 traveling along Fifth Avenue near Central Park.

Limited-stop service on the M2 began between 110th Street and 8th Street on October 14, 1991, replacing local service between 7 a.m. and 7 p.m. In September 1995, limited-stop service was implemented on Saturdays between 10 a.m. and 6 p.m. In January 2000, the MTA Board announced plans to implement limited-stop M2 service on Sundays between 10 a.m. and 6 p.m. due to continued increases in weekend ridership. The change was to take effect in spring 2000, and was expected to reduce costs by $25,000 a year. On May 21, 2000, this change took effect. On the same day, Sunday M3 service began starting 17 minutes earlier.

In March 2000, plans were announced to reroute the M4 to run via the same route in both directions between West 159th Street and West 165th Street. Buses would run via Broadway, West 165th Street, and Fort Washington Avenue. At the time, northbound buses ran via Broadway and West 168th Street before turning north onto Fort Washington Avenue, while southbound buses ran via Fort Washington Avenue before turning south onto Broadway. The change would be made to eliminate the M4's asymmetric route and reroute it from a congested block of West 168th Street. In May 2000, the MTA announced plans to revise the terminal loop for the M2 and M18 bus routes and relocate their terminal from West 167th Street between Audubon Avenue and St. Nicholas Avenue to the northern side of West 168th Street between Audubon Avenue and St. Nicholas Avenue. The M2 made a circuitous route to reach the 168th Street subway station, including a u-turn from northbound St. Nicholas Avenue to southbound Broadway, and the M18 misses the subway station. The M18 bus route missed the terminal loop of the M2 would be revised to run along Audubon Avenue, West 168th Street, and Broadway instead of Audubon Avenue, West 167th Street, St. Nicholas Avenue, West 168th Street, and Broadway. The M18 bus terminal loop would be revised from consisting of Audubon Avenue, West 167th Street, and St. Nicholas Avenue to consisting of Audubon Avenue, West 168th Street, Broadway, West 166th Street, and St. Nicholas Avenue. The revised changes would eliminate the u-turn and, by having southbound M18 buses share a stop with the M2 and M3 at Broadway and West 168th Street, could potentially equalize boarding on those routes. The change was expected to be implemented in mid-2000. On July 2, 2000, the changes in M2, M4, and M18 bus service took effect.

Plans were announced in April 2002 to reroute northbound evening and late night M2 service off of Wanamaker Place, University Place, and East 14th Street and onto Fourth Avenue, which was the route used by M2 during the rest of the day. The change was made so M2 service would not be split between two corridors overnight, to simplify M2 service, reduce travel times by three to five minutes, and consolidate late night M1 and M2 service. The service change took effect on June 30, 2002.

On June 25, 2010, as a result of service cuts, MTA no longer operated weekend M1 service into Midtown, instead terminating at 106th Street. After numerous requests to rescind some of the 2010 service cuts, the MTA restored the M1 to 8th Street on the weekends on January 6, 2013. There was a proposal underway to re-extend this line back down to Worth Street in early 2017. In this proposal, every other bus would go to Worth Street via Bowery and Third Avenue, returning uptown via Centre Street and Lafayette Street. The M1 was extended back down to Grand Street on September 3, 2017, though downtown buses run on Broadway. Service will eventually be re-extended to Worth Street, after which the downtown buses running below 8th Street will be rerouted onto Bowery.

In April 2018, it was proposed to permanently truncate the M4's southern terminal to 41st Street. This was due to a street-widening along 32nd Street that would cause delays for M4 buses from terminating there, since that portion of the route was shared with the Q32, which continues northward from Penn Station to Jackson Heights, Queens. The change would occur in summer 2018. To allow M4 riders to access Penn Station, and vice versa, free transfers would be available between Q32 and M4 buses going in the same direction. However, the plan was then changed to have the M4 continue down to 32nd Street, where it would terminate midway between 5th and Madison Avenues, two blocks from Penn Station. This was likely done to minimize the impact of the route changes because of the 32nd Street widening, while still maintaining the same connectivity with other routes, like the M34 and M34A SBS at 34th Street.

On June 30, 2024, the M2 stop on Audubon Avenue at West 165th Street was discontinued and was redirected to Amsterdam Avenue, and the M3 stop terminal was relocated to St. Nicholas Avenue at West 192nd Street. The northbound M4 stop on East 32nd Street at Fifth Avenue was relocated to Madison Avenue at East 32nd Street. The stop on East 32nd Street at Fifth Avenue was changed to be a drop-off only stop.

== Incidents ==
In the morning rush of April 4, 2014, a bus that was about to do M4 service crashed into Tommy’s Grill & Pizzeria in Washington Heights after a minivan bumped the bus while making a left turn. There were five injuries, but all were in stable condition.
