= M5 and M55 buses =

Bus routes in Manhattan, New York

m5, m55 m5
- Fifth/Sixth Avenues/Broadway Line
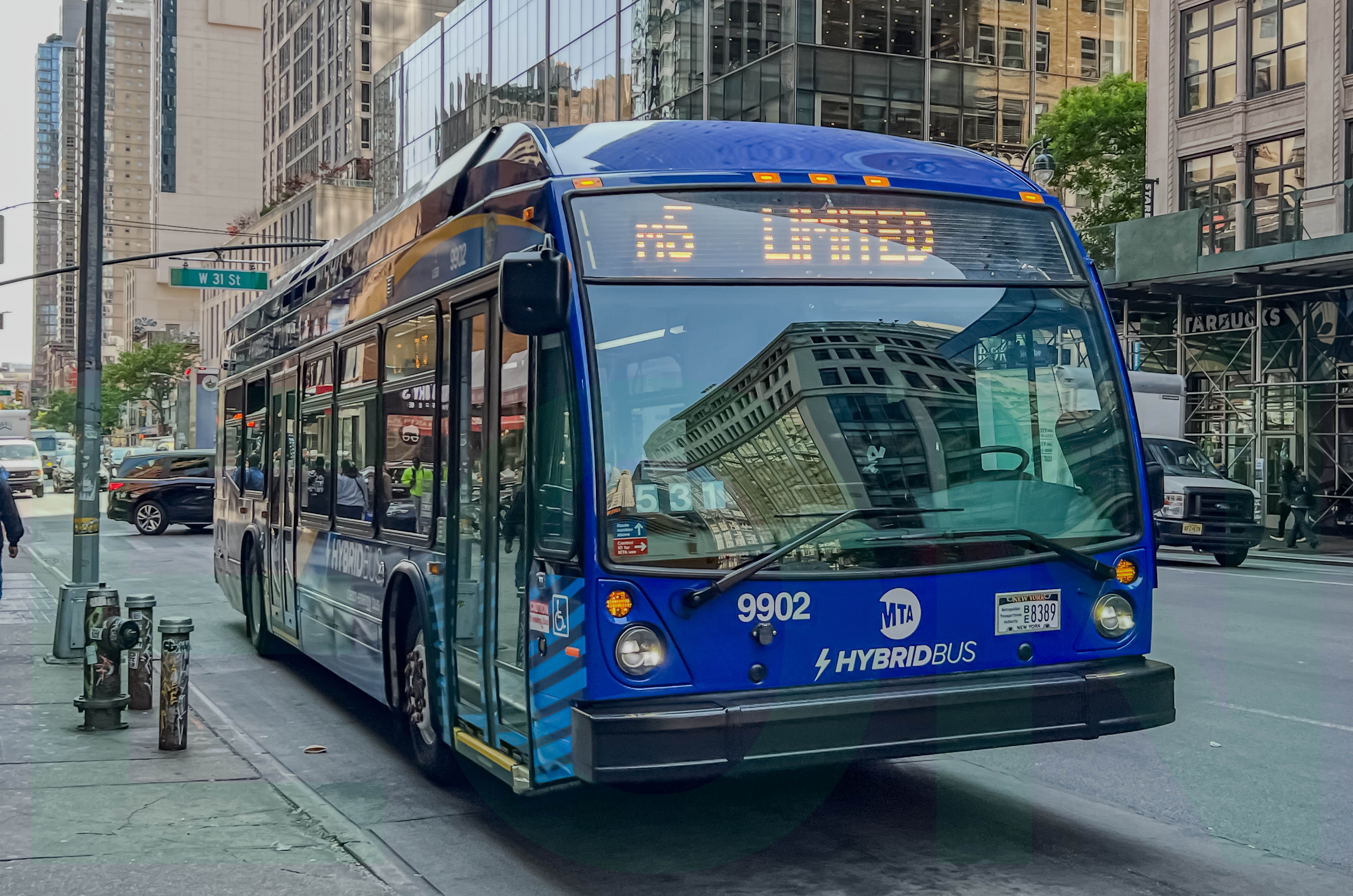
- A 2021 Nova Bus LFS HEV (9902) on the Washington Heights-bound M5 Limited in May 2023

Overview
- System: MTA Regional Bus Operations
- Operator: Manhattan and Bronx Surface Transit Operating Authority
- Garage: Manhattanville Depot (M5); Michael J. Quill Depot (M55)
- Vehicle: Orion VII NG HEV (M5 only); New Flyer Xcelsior XDE40 (M5 only); Nova Bus LFS HEV; New Flyer Xcelsior XD40 (M55 only); New Flyer Xcelsior XE40 (M55 only)
- Began service: 1864 (train); 1893 (streetcar); 1936 (M5 bus); 2017 (M55 bus)

Route
- Locale: Manhattan, New York, U.S.
- Start: M5: Washington Heights – GW Bridge; M55: 44th Street / 6th Avenue
- Via: Fifth Avenue (southbound); Sixth Avenue (northbound); Broadway; Riverside Drive (M5 only)
- End: M5: 31st Street / 6th Avenue; M55: South Ferry
- Length: M5 SB: 8.5 miles (13.7 km); M55 SB: 4.5 miles (7.2 km)

Service
- Operates: 4:50 AM – 1:20 AM
- Annual patronage: 1,844,777 (M5, 2025); 579,332 (M55, 2025)
- Transfers: Yes (within 2 hours)
- Timetable: M5 M55

The M5 and M55 bus routes constitute a public transit corridor in Manhattan, New York City, running along the Fifth / Sixth Avenues / Riverside Drive Line as well as the southern portion of the Broadway Line after the discontinuation of the M6. The routes primarily run along Broadway, Fifth and Sixth Avenues, and Riverside Drive from South Ferry, Lower Manhattan to Washington Heights. The M5 covers the northern portion of the route north of 31st Street, while the M55 operates along the southern portion of the route south of 44th Street. The two routes overlap in Midtown Manhattan. The portion along Broadway south of East 8th Street was originally a streetcar line.

The whole line was a single route, the M5, until January 2017, when the M55 was created.

== Route description ==
=== Broadway Line ===
The Broadway line began at Columbus Circle. It runs east along Central Park South one block, and turned right onto Seventh Avenue. It followed Seventh to Times Square, and bore left on Broadway. It followed Broadway to Madison Square, and bore right onto Fifth Avenue. It ran on Fifth along with the Fifth/Madison Avenue Line to 8th Street. Both lines turned left onto East 8th Street (also known as St. Marks Place) east towards Broadway. The current M5 and M55 follow a similar route, except the M55 does not run on Broadway north of St. Marks Place after the pedestrian plazas were implemented.

=== M5 ===
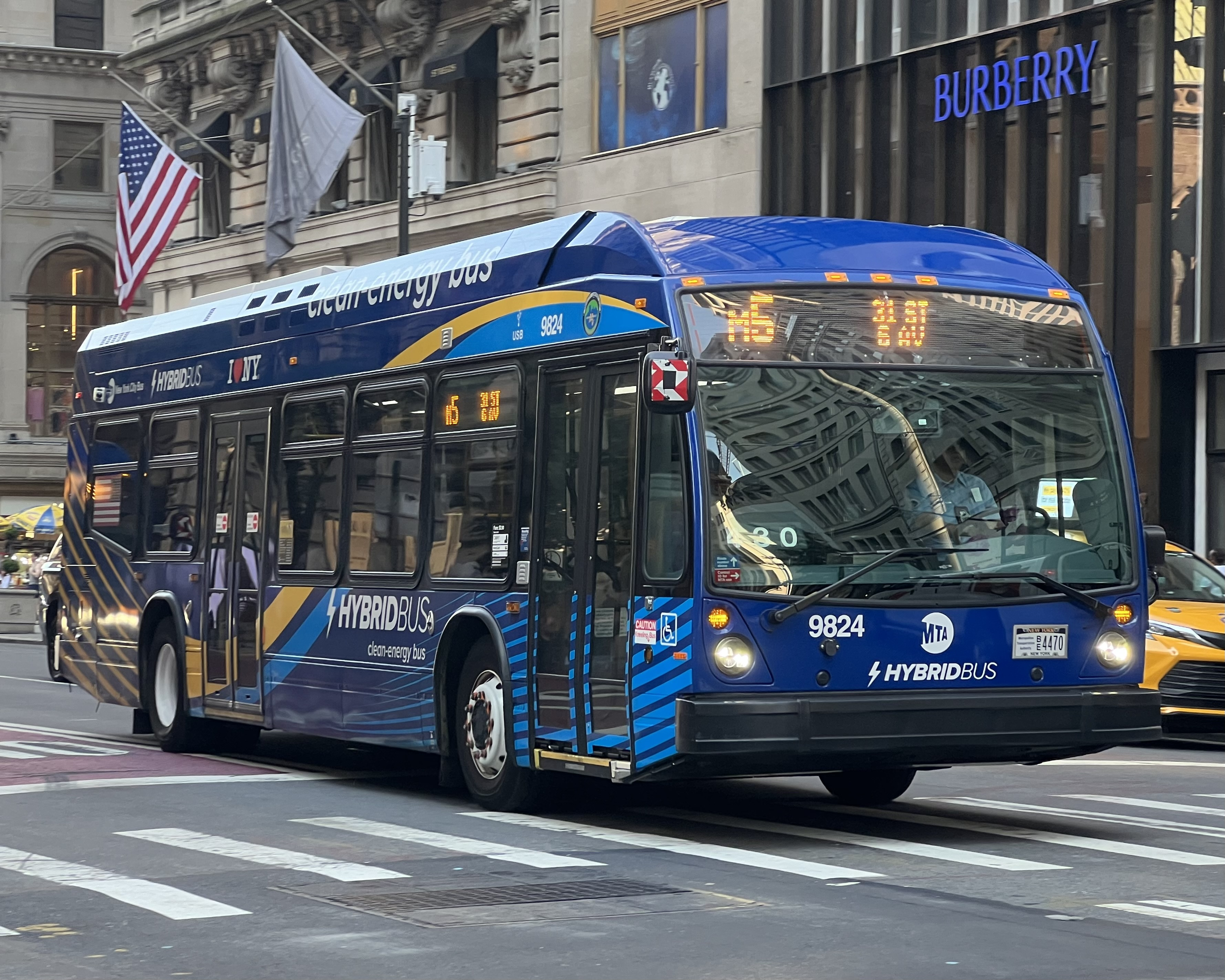
A 2021 Nova Bus LFS HEV (9824) on the 31st St/6th Ave-bound M5 operating along Fifth Avenue in June 2024

The M5 starts at 31st Street between Fifth and Sixth Avenues, using Sixth Avenue northbound and Fifth Avenue southbound until it reaches Central Park South. This corridor is shared by the M1, M2, M3 and M4 routes, and Sixth Avenue with the M7. There, the M5 runs crosstown along Central Park South (West 59th Street) and uptown along Broadway from Columbus Circle to West 72nd Street, where it crosses over to the southern terminus of Riverside Drive. This Broadway section is shared by the M7 and M104, and 72nd Street is shared by the street's M72 crosstown bus route, as well as the M57. The route shifts to Riverside Drive, parallel to Broadway and runs the entire length of the street. This portion is not served by any other bus route. At 135th Street, the bus route goes back to Broadway, where it meets the M4 route, and continues up that street until Fort Washington Avenue, where the M4 shifts on that street to head to The Cloisters while the M5 continues up Broadway until the George Washington Bridge Bus Station at 178th Street.

=== M55 ===
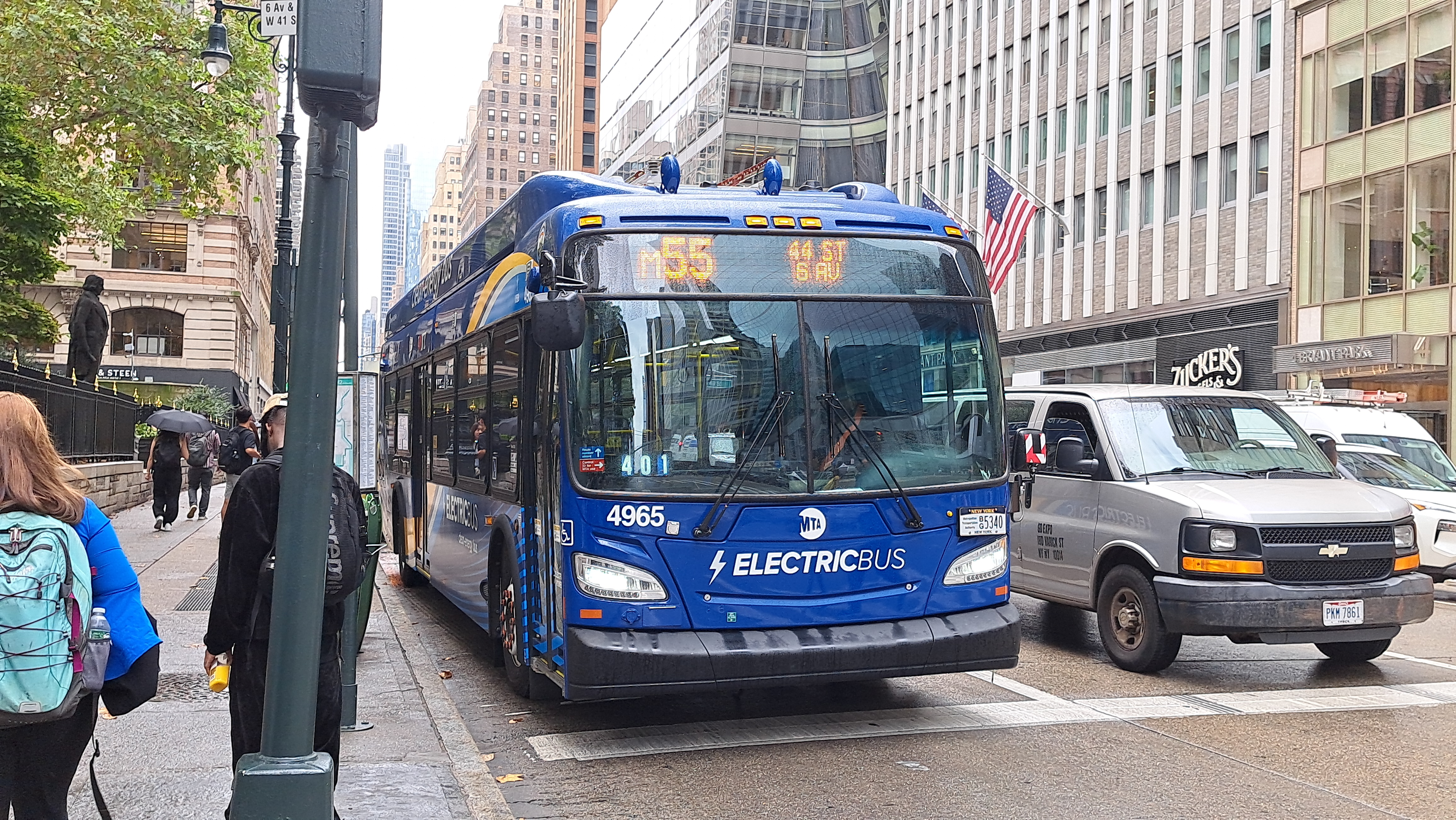
A 2023 New Flyer XE40 (4965) on the 44th St/6th Ave-bound M55.

The northbound M55 route begins at South Ferry and runs uptown on Church Street and Sixth Avenue until 44th Street, where it terminates. Southbound M55 buses run along Fifth Avenue to East 8th Street (also known as St. Marks Place), then turns left to run east on the street towards Broadway. At Broadway, the M55 turns right and terminates at Whitehall Street along the Staten Island Ferry Whitehall Terminal bus loop. Some southbound buses may terminate at Broadway & Chambers Street.

The M5 is based out of Manhattanville Depot, while the M55 is based out of Michael J. Quill Depot. During the daytime on weekdays, all M5 buses make limited stops between 135th and 157th Streets, as well as below 72nd Street. The M5 Limited serves all local stops between 72nd and 135th Streets and north of 157th Street. When the M5 Limited is running, there is no M5 local service. The M55 runs local at all times.

== History ==
=== Streetcar service ===
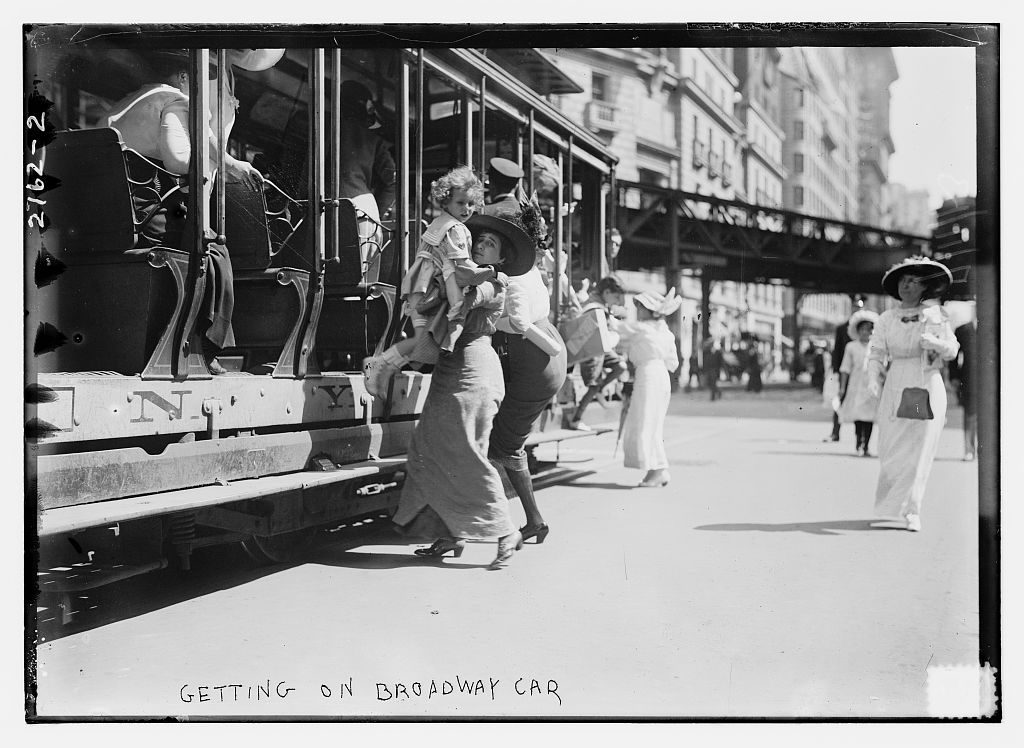
Getting on the Broadway trolley at Herald Square, 1913

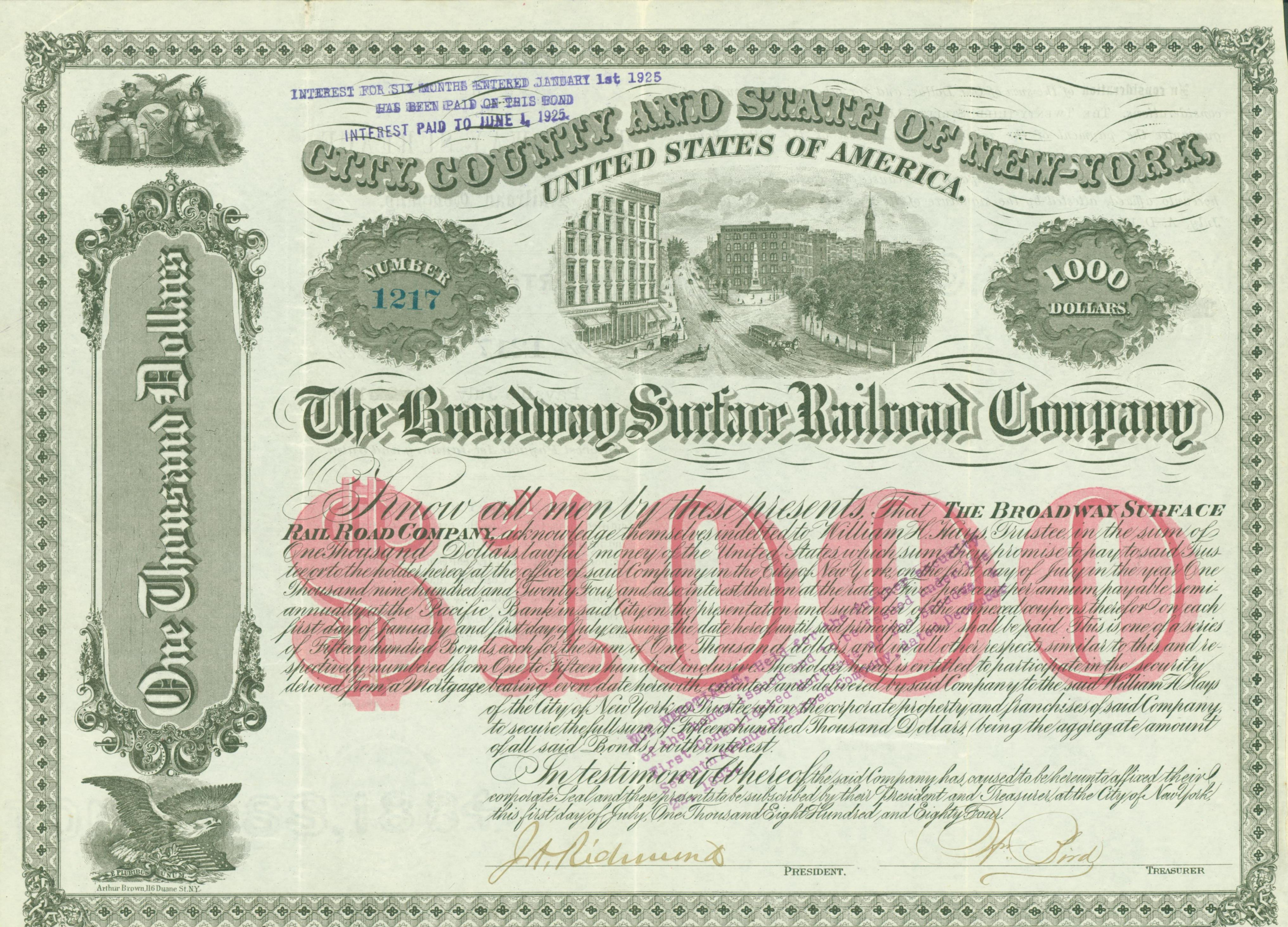
Bond of the Broadway Surface Railroad Company, issued 1. July 1884

The Broadway and Seventh Avenue Railroad opened a line from Lower Manhattan to Central Park in 1864. However, south of Union Square, tracks were not allowed in Broadway due to local opposition. Thus the route began in the trackage west of City Hall, jointly owned by the Sixth Avenue Railroad and Eighth Avenue Railroad, and used the one-way pair of Church Street and West Broadway to Canal Street and Greene Street and Wooster Street to 8th Street, north of which both directions used University Place to Union Square. North of Union Square, tracks were built in Broadway to north of Times Square, where it merged with the Broadway and Seventh Avenue Railroad's other line, along Seventh Avenue, to end at Seventh Avenue and 59th Street.

On May 8, 1884, Jacob Sharp, the owner of the Broadway and Seventh Avenue Railroad, incorporated the Broadway Surface Railroad to run along Broadway from Union Square south to the Bowling Green. It opened in 1885, and was leased to the Broadway and Seventh Avenue Railroad. A cable was installed on May 1, 1893, and the Lexington Avenue Line and Broadway and Columbus Avenue Line were also operated by cable as branches. The Broadway Line was electrified with conduit in May 1901.

The Broadway and Seventh Avenue Railroad was leased by the Houston, West Street and Pavonia Ferry Railroad on June 30, 1893, and the lessee merged with the Broadway Surface Railroad and South Ferry Railroad on November 29, 1893 to form the Metropolitan Street Railway. Buses were substituted for streetcars by the New York City Omnibus Corporation on March 6, 1936, as route number 6. That company changed its name to Fifth Avenue Coach Lines in 1956; the Manhattan and Bronx Surface Transit Operating Authority took over operations in 1962.

=== Reroutes along north-south avenues ===
When Broadway from 34th Street to Columbus Circle, Sixth Avenue from 34th Street to 59th Street, and Seventh Avenue from Times Square to 59th Street became one-way streets on March 10, 1957, the Broadway-Seventh Avenue route 6's northbound route was shifted to Sixth Avenue between 34th and 59th Streets. When several lower Manhattan streets were converted to one-way traffic on June 3, 1962, the 6's northbound path in the area was rearranged to travel along Greenwich Street, Trinity Place and Church Street. Following the one-way conversions of Sixth Avenue below 34th Street to one-way northbound, and of Broadway between 34th and 23rd Streets and between 14th and Canal Streets to one-way southbound, on November 10, 1963, the NYCO's Sixth Avenue bus (numbered 5) was discontinued and absorbed into the 6, now designated the Broadway-Seventh Avenue-Avenue of the Americas Line, and later M6.

Meanwhile, the Fifth Avenue Coach Company had been operating its own route 5, the Fifth Avenue–Riverside Drive line, since August 5, 1900. For decades up to the 1962 MABSTOA takeover, its route largely held the same: running from 168th Street – Washington Heights to Washington Square Park, traveling through Fifth Avenue south of 57th Street, then turning onto Broadway through Columbus Circle, turning at 72nd Street towards Riverside Drive on its way to its northern terminus. The only change in the route path was following Broadway's conversion to one-way southbound between Columbus Circle and Herald Square in 1957, requiring the northbound 5 to turn at 57th Street onto Eighth Avenue en route to Columbus Circle.

=== Bus service ===
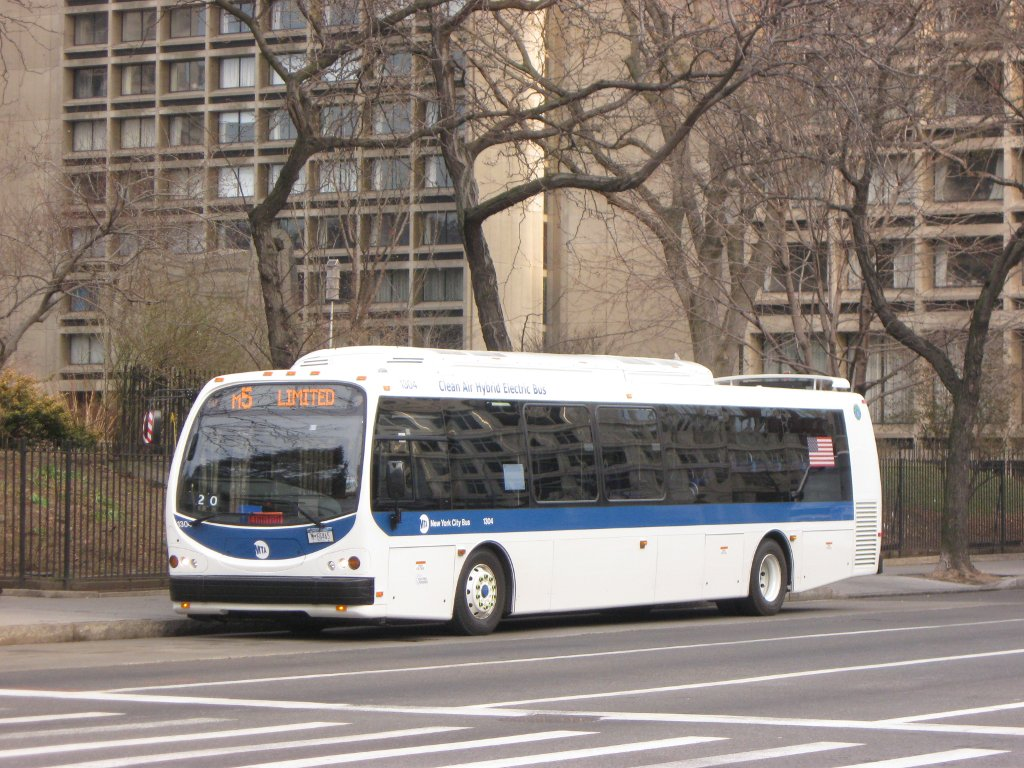
A 2009 DesignLine EcoSaver IV (1304) on the M5 Limited in Greenwich Village in 2009

In the first decade following MABSTOA's 1962 takeover of all Fifth Avenue Coach and Surface Transit lines, several changes to the M5's route were made. After Washington Square Park was closed to bus traffic on September 2, 1963, its southern terminus (and that of today's M2 and M3) was moved to 8th Street west of University Place, then turning on there to 9th Street towards Fifth Avenue. Next, on November 10, 1963 (the same day the NYCO's 5 was discontinued), the southern terminus of the FACCo's 5 was moved to Houston Street and West Broadway, and its route south of 8th Street extended to Broadway southbound and Sixth Avenue northbound (M2 and M3's southern terminus was moved further east to 8th Street and Fourth Avenue in the vicinity of Cooper Square as part of the same service change). The rest of the 5's northbound route below 57th Street was shifted to Sixth Avenue on January 14, 1966 following Fifth Avenue's conversion to one-way southbound.

In 1966, the New York City Transit Authority proposed rerouting alternate 5 buses from Riverside Drive to West End Avenue and Broadway during the evenings, due to frequent muggings on Riverside Drive; the southern half of the route would have remained unchanged. However, residents near Riverside Drive opposed the proposal, which the New York City Board of Estimate ultimately rejected. The 5's northern terminus was extended to 178th Street – George Washington Bridge Bus Station on January 10, 1971. In 1976, eight double-decker buses were placed into service on the M4 and M5 routes as part of a two-year test. The buses were 14.5 feet (4.4 m) tall, which required the relocation of several traffic lights and removal of tree limbs along the routes.

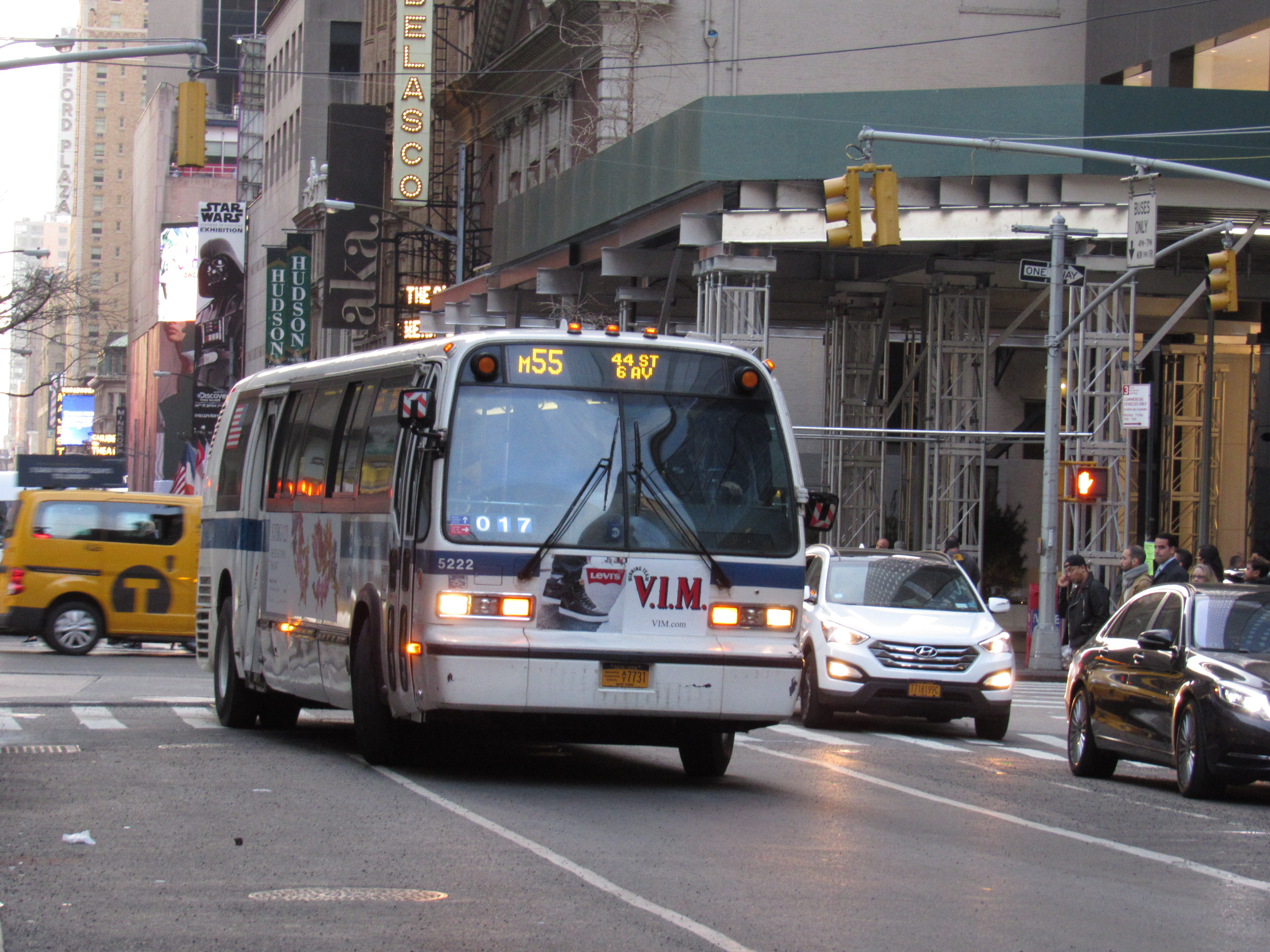
A 1999 Nova Bus RTS-06 (5222) at the M55’s northern terminal (44th St-6th Ave) in Midtown.

Closures of Broadway in the Theater District south of 47th Street and around Herald Square in 2009 resulted in major changes to the M6's southbound service, with the northern half of the route shifting to Seventh Avenue before returning to Broadway in the vicinity of Union Square. On July 13, 2009, southbound M6 service was rerouted to run across 23rd Street instead of 14th Street to provide more consistent service. On June 27, 2010, due to budget problems, the M6 was discontinued and the M5 was extended to South Ferry via Broadway to replace former M1 and M6 service south of Houston Street.

In January 2016, it was proposed to split the M5 into two routes. The uptown section would continue to operate as the M5, running between Washington Heights and West 37th Street in Midtown. The downtown section would be the M55, a new route between Midtown and South Ferry. In July, in response to public comments, the proposal was modified so the routes could have a 13-block overlap in Midtown. Under the modified proposal, the M5 would run between Washington Heights and West 31st Street near Penn Station and Herald Square; the M55 would run between West 44th Street, two blocks north of Bryant Park, and South Ferry, starting on January 8, 2017. The new route would provide 88% of M5 customers to have reliable service without transferring, since many customers from both ends wanted to retain service to Midtown (the area between 34th Street and 59th Street). The M5 would continue to have limited-stop service during the daytime, while the M55 would operate local at all times. Other ideas to improve reliability, which included restoring the M5 and M6 to their pre-2010 services and converting the M5 into a Select Bus Service route, were rejected. A three-legged transfer was provided to M5 and M55 customers along Fifth and Sixth Avenues. The split M5 and M55 routes began service on January 8, 2017.
