= New York Railways Corporation =

Map of the 1911 system

The New York Railways Corporation was a railway company that operated street railways in Manhattan, New York City, United States, between 1925 and 1936. During 1935/1936 it converted its remaining lines to bus routes which were operated by the New York City Omnibus Corporation, and now operated by the Manhattan and Bronx Surface Transit Operating Authority. The organization was the successor to the New York Railways Company which was in receivership.

== History ==
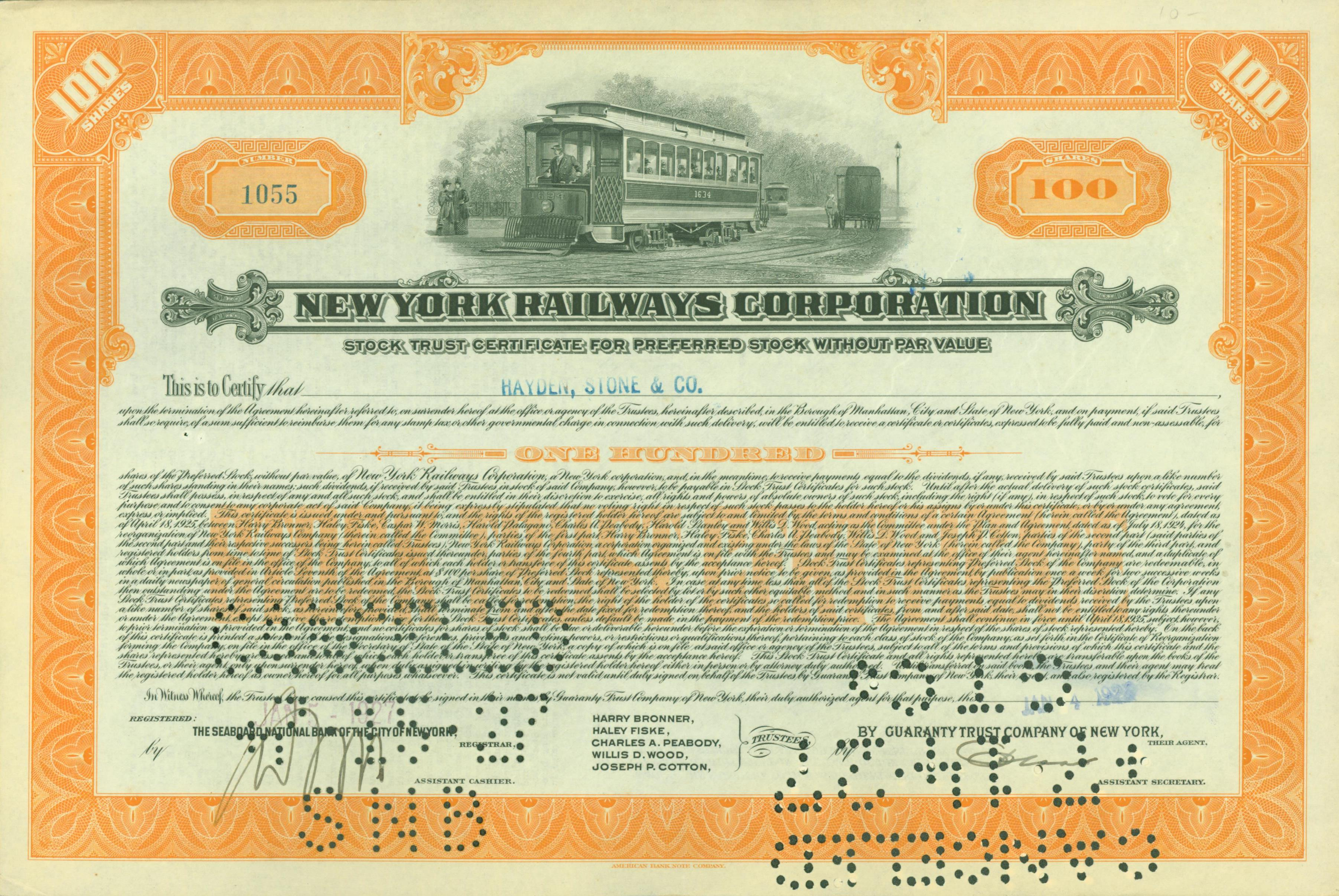
Share of the New York Railways Corporation, issued 5. January 1927

The New York Railways Corporation took over operations from the receivers of the New York Railways Company on May 1, 1925.

A majority of stock was bought in August 1926 by the Fifth Avenue Coach Company which had been acquired by the newly formed the Omnibus Corporation the same year. It was reported at the time that the company had plans to abandon the lines and replace them with buses operated by the newly formed New York City Omnibus Corporation.

The Eighth and Ninth Avenue Railroads merged in December 1926 to form the Eighth and Ninth Avenues Railway, but that company entered receivership on May 5, 1927, and was bought by the Fifth Avenue Coach Company. The New York and Harlem's lines were leased again in 1932.

Conversion to bus operation started with the Fourth and Madison Avenues Line in February 1935 using specially-built larger vehicles from Yellow Coach Manufacturing Company). The line was judged to be a success and the remaining streetcar lines were converted over an 18-month period:

- Sixth Avenue Line - March 12, 1936
- Seventh Avenue Line - March 6, 1936
- Eighth Avenue Line - November 12, 1935
- Ninth and Amsterdam Avenues Line - November 12, 1935
- Broadway Line - February 12, 1936
- Columbus Avenue Line - February 12, 1936
- Lexington Avenue Line - March 25, 1936
- Eighth Street Crosstown Line - March 6, 1936
- 14th Street Crosstown Line - April 20, 1936
- 23rd Street Crosstown Line - April 8, 1936
- 34th Street Crosstown Line - April 1, 1936
- 86th Street Crosstown Line - June 8, 1936
- 116th Street Crosstown Line - April 1, 1936

Due to a stockholders' lawsuit, the company had to operate a single trolley trip on each line until early June 1936 to retain the franchises. The 86th Street Crosstown Line was the last New York Railways line because Green Bus Lines was operating buses along 86th Street. The New York and Harlem Railroad trolleys (Fourth and Madison Avenues; 86th Street Crosstown was not replaced with buses) were replaced by Madison Avenue Coach Company buses, and the Eighth and Ninth Avenues Railway trolleys by Eighth Avenue Coach Company buses, both companies owned by Fifth Avenue Coach.
