= New York and Harlem Railroad =

American railroad and tramway (1832-1935)

- New York and Harlem Railroad (red) and New York Central system (orange) as of 1918

Overview
- Locale: New York
- Dates of operation: 1832–1873 (main line); 1832–1896 and 1920–1935 (streetcars)
- Successor: New York Central Railroad (north of 42nd Street); New York City Railway (south of 42nd Street)

Technical
- Track gauge: 4 ft 8 1/2 in (1,435 mm) standard gauge

The New York and Harlem Railroad (now the Metro-North Railroad's Harlem Line) was one of the first railroads in the United States, and was the world's first street railway. Designed by John Stephenson, it was opened in stages between 1832 and 1852 between Lower Manhattan Island to and beyond Harlem. Horses initially pulled railway carriages, followed by a conversion to steam engines, then on to battery-powered Julien electric traction cars. In 1907, the then leaseholders of the line, New York City Railway, a streetcar operator, went into receivership. Following a further receivership in 1932, the New York Railways Corporation converted the line to bus operation. The Murray Hill Tunnel now carries a lane of road traffic, but not the buses.

The line became part of the New York Central Railroad system with trackage rights granted to the New York, New Haven and Hartford Railroad into Manhattan. It is now part of the Metro-North Railroad system, and the only Manhattan trackage of that system. As of 2017, Metro-North operates commuter passenger service from Grand Central Terminal, via Southeast (change from electric to diesel power), to Wassaic. The trackless right-of-way from Wassaic to Chatham is being converted to the Harlem Valley Rail Trail.

== History ==
The New York and Harlem Railroad was first built from the original Grand Central Terminal on 42nd Street in New York City to suburban Harlem. Opposition to the charter was voiced by steamboat proprietors, whose service was successfully competed against by the new railroad; to avoid steamboat competition on the Hudson River, the tracks were laid on the east side of Manhattan Island, away from the Hudson. The railroad was extended an additional 125 miles (201 km) northward, reaching Chatham, New York in 1852. When the railroad was extended further, it provided a rail route for people and commerce northward to Albany, Boston, and towns in Vermont and Canada. The completion of the Harlem Valley Railroad also resulted in the availability of products transported by rail directly to New York City, rather than depending on river transport via Poughkeepsie.

In 1831, when the New York and Harlem Railroad received its charter, it was an early commuter railroad connecting Harlem with lower Manhattan (New York City). Early in the 1840s, the Harlem Valley Railroad was extended northward into Westchester County, and then was authorized by the New York State Legislature to be further extended northward in order to create a connection with Albany. On May 12, 1846, a new competitor received its charter to build a railroad alongside the Hudson River between New York City's lower Manhattan west side and Albany, backed mostly by wealthy Poughkeepsie manufacturers and merchants. (It was completed to Albany on October 3, 1851, after a great amount of costly blasting, filling and tunneling the craggy eastern shore of the Hudson River.) The Harlem Valley's directors started to worry that Boston would have a competitive advantage over New York City for the expanding "western trade." An easier and less-costly inland route, also to be named "Harlem Valley", was thus created.

=== Construction ===
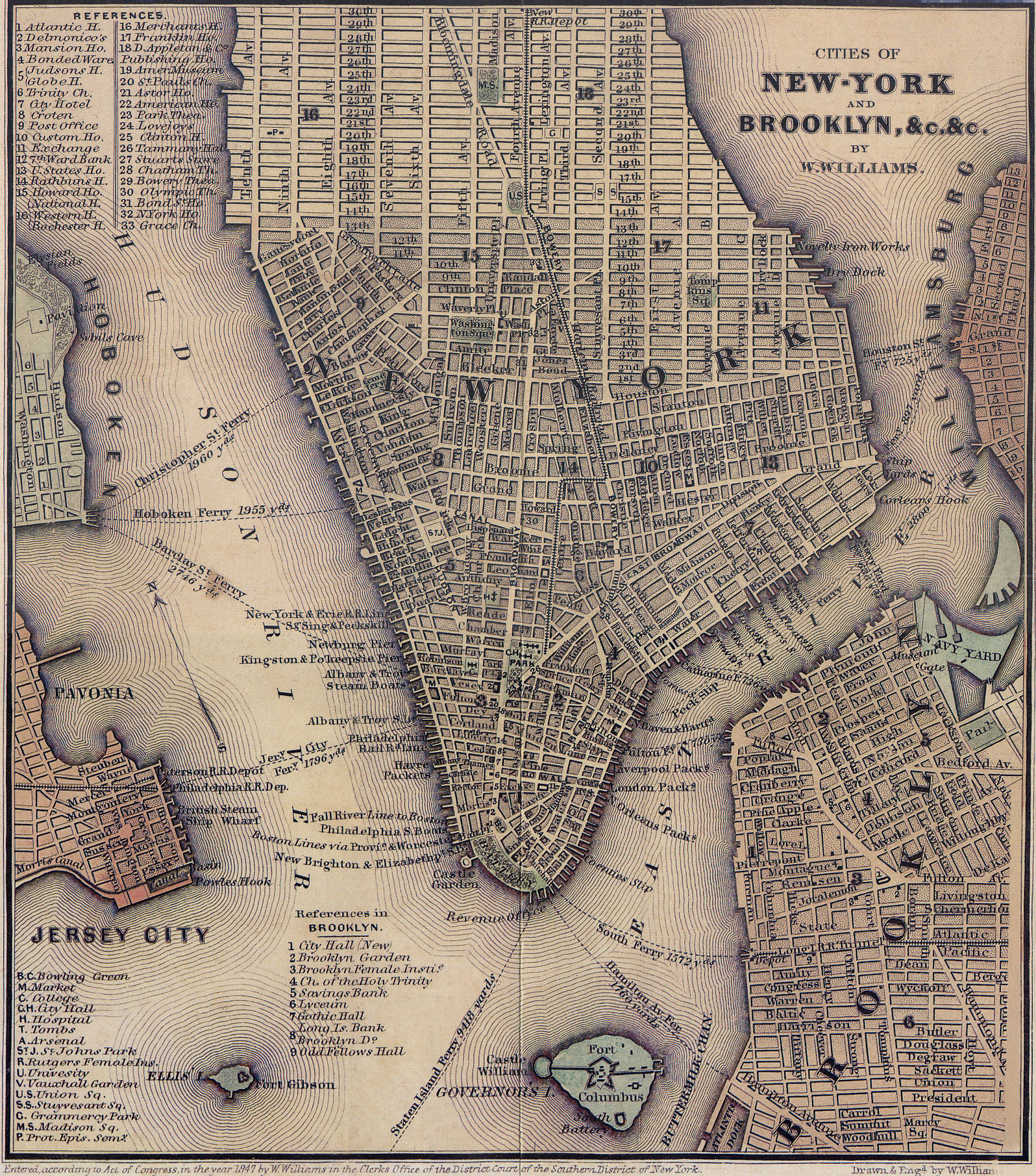
An 1847 map of Lower Manhattan; the only railroad in Manhattan at that time was the New York and Harlem Railroad

The company was incorporated on April 25, 1831 as the New York and Harlem Railroad, to link New York City with suburban Harlem. Among the company's founders was John Mason, a wealthy banker and president of Chemical Bank who was among the largest landowners in New York City. They decided to build their railroad on the eastern side of Manhattan Island, convinced that it would never be able to compete with steamboat traffic on the Hudson River.

The first section, along Bowery from Prince Street north to 14th Street, opened on November 26, 1832. After that, the following sections opened:

- June 10, 1833 – north along Fourth Avenue to 32nd Street
- May 9, 1834 – north along Fourth Avenue to Yorkville, including the Murray Hill Tunnel
- October 26, 1837 – north along Fourth Avenue to Harlem, including the Yorkville Tunnel
- May 4, 1839 – south along Bowery, Broome Street and Centre Street to City Hall at Centre Street and Park Row
- September 3, 1842 – north to Williamsbridge
- December 1, 1844 – north to White Plains
- June 1, 1847 – north to Croton Falls
- December 31, 1848 – north to Dover Plains
- January 19, 1852 – north to Chatham Four Corners with a connection to the Albany and West Stockbridge Railroad, and trackage rights northwest to Albany.
- November 26, 1852 – south along Park Row to Astor House at Park Row and Broadway
- A freight branch was built to Port Morris, following the 1853 purchase of the Spuyten Duyvil and Port Morris Railroad and abandoned late in the 20th century. Parts are still visible.

Between 1847 and 1856, a track was built in Grand Street between Centre Street and Bowery (along with one block on the Bowery) for northbound trains. Southbound trains continued to use the old route.

In 1864 or 1865, a branch was added for trains between downtown and the East 34th Street Ferry Landing, running along 32nd Street, Lexington Avenue and 34th Street. This was the start of separate horse car service, running between Astor House and the ferry.

Grand Central Depot opened just north of 42nd Street in October, 1871, and intercity passenger trains from the north were ended there. Freight trains continued to operate along the tracks south of Grand Central, as did streetcars (still turning off at 42nd Street).

=== Operation and control ===
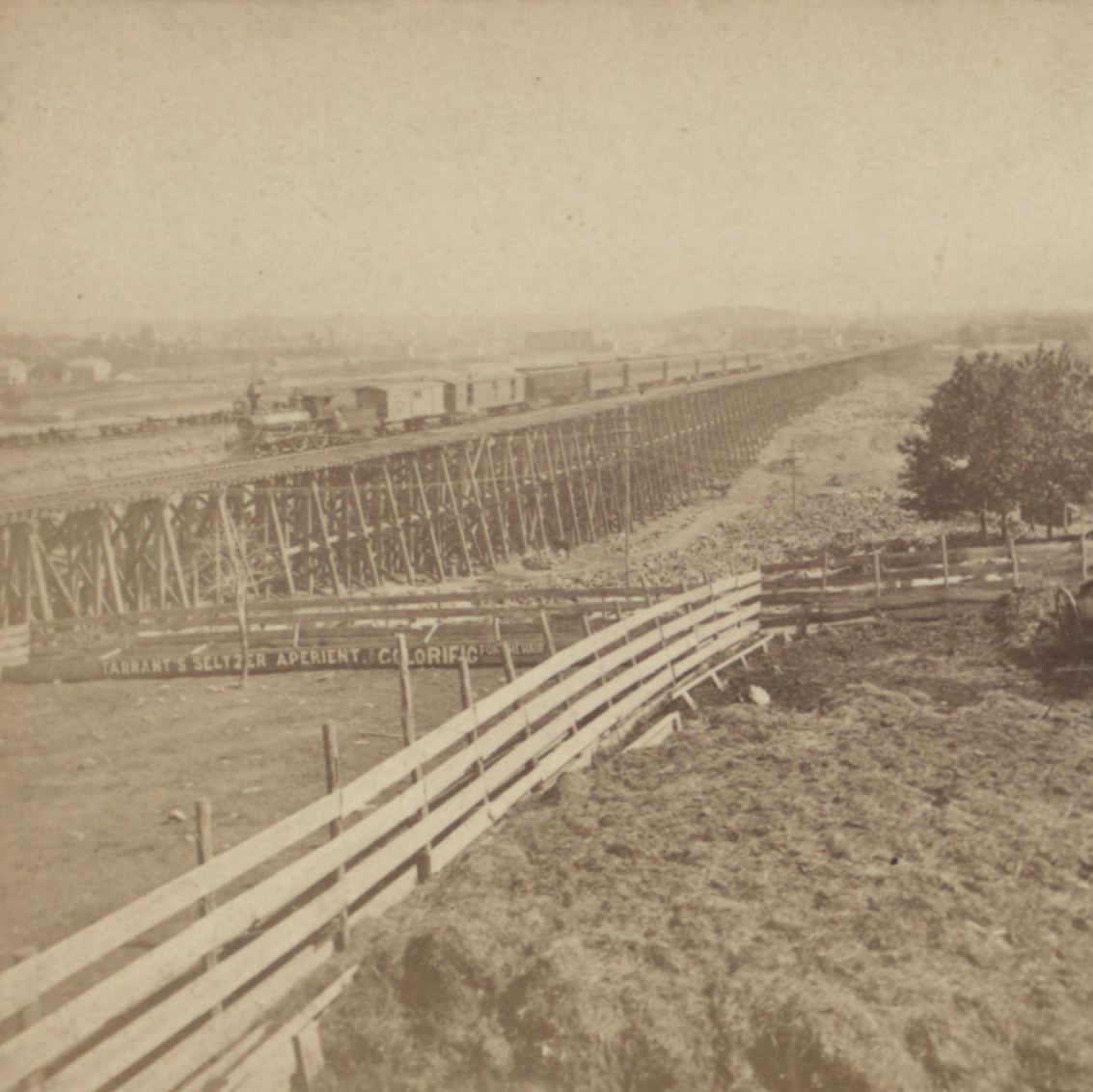
Railroad trestle work, between 100th & 116th Streets on 4th Avenue, New York, c. 1870

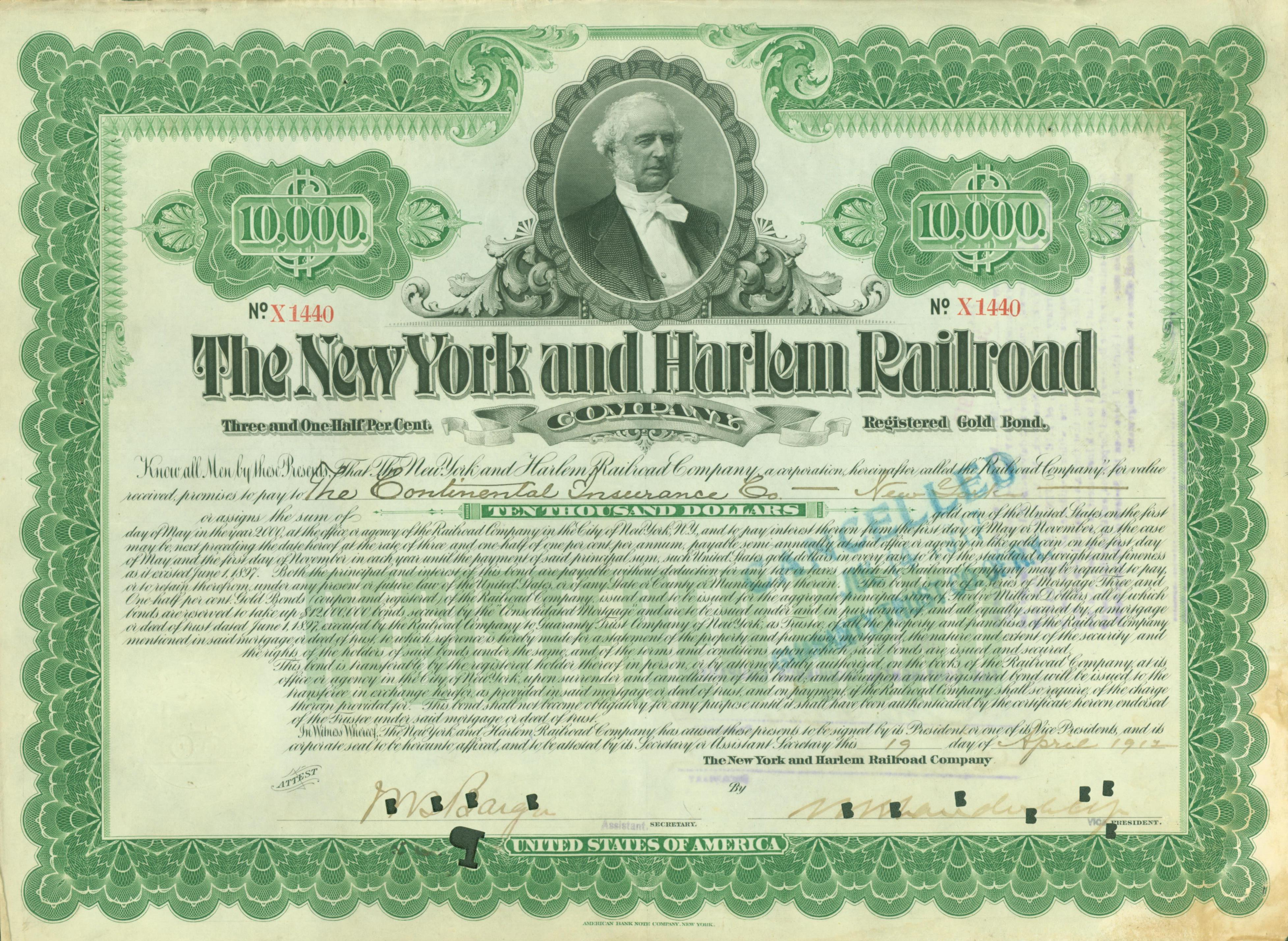
Gold Bond of the New York and Harlem Railroad, issued 19 April 1917

As in other early railroads, the dominant propulsion in the railroad's early years was horse power. In 1837, steam engines were introduced, but their use was limited to areas outside of the heavily settled parts of the city, which was then south of 23rd Street.

The New York City Common Council passed an ordinance on December 27, 1854, to take effect in 18 months, barring the NY&H from using steam power south of 42nd Street, due to complaints by persons whose property abutted the right-of-way. Before that, the steam locomotives had run to 32nd Street. When the ordinance took effect, the NY&H had not done anything. After much debate, including an injunction issued preventing the city from enforcing the ordinance, the courts struck down the injunction on July 30, 1858.

In 1864, the railroad was purchased by Cornelius Vanderbilt, who consolidated it five years later with the Hudson River Railroad to form the New York Central and Hudson River Railroad: a precursor of the much larger New York Central Railroad.

On July 2, 1870, horsecars started to run not only to the 34th Street Ferry but to 73rd Street via Madison Avenue. These trains ran through the Murray Hill Tunnel and turned west on 42nd before going north on Madison (northbound cars used Vanderbilt Avenue to 44th Street). The line was soon extended to 86th Street and then to Harlem.

On April 1, 1873, the NY&H leased its freight lines to the New York Central and Hudson River Railroad, but the horsecar line south of Grand Central remained separate. This eventually became the New York Central Railroad and then part of Penn Central and Conrail. Metro-North Railroad took over the line in 1983.

The first electric streetcar open to passengers in New York City, a Julien electric traction car, was run on September 17, 1888 on the line to 86th Street. The line went back to using horses for a time, but switched to a "below-grade third rail" (commonly called a "conduit") in 1897. On July 1, 1896, the Metropolitan Street Railway leased the streetcar lines.

=== Receivership and conversion to bus operation ===
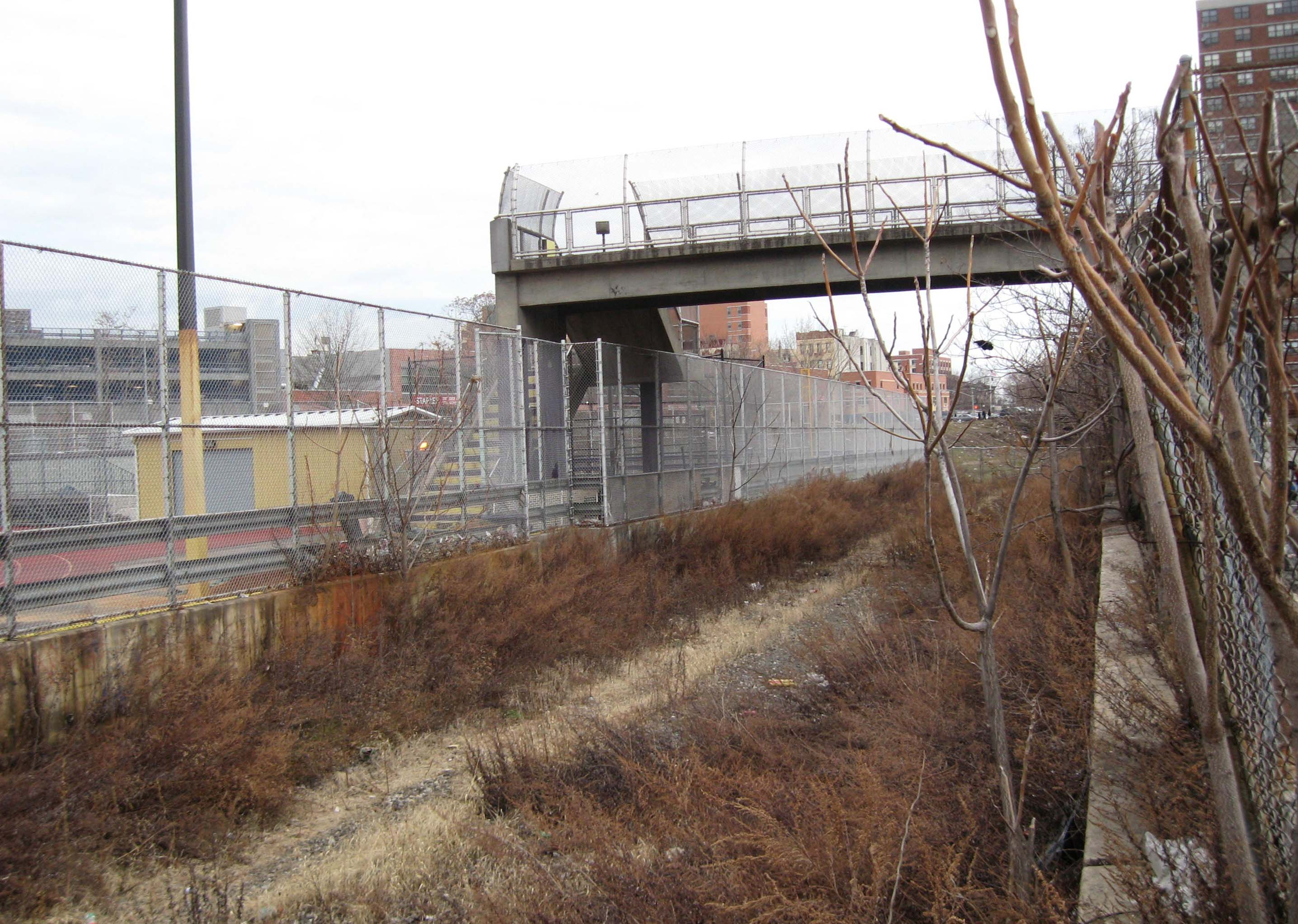
Abandoned Port Morris Branch.

The New York City Railway, which leased the Metropolitan, and hence also these lines, went into receivership on September 24, 1907. The receivers returned operation of the Fourth Avenue line back to the Metropolitan Street Railway on July 31, 1908. The lease was terminated on January 31, 1920, with operation returned to the NY&H.

On October 10, 1932, it was leased again, this time to the New York Railways Corporation, with the right to convert the line to bus operation. The stockholders voted to do this on February 19, 1934.

An approximation of the route is now traveled by NYCT Bus's M1 bus. The Murray Hill Tunnel now carries a lane of roadway, but not the buses.

== See also ==
- Harlem Line
