= Fifth Avenue Transportation Company =

Defunct transportation company in New York City

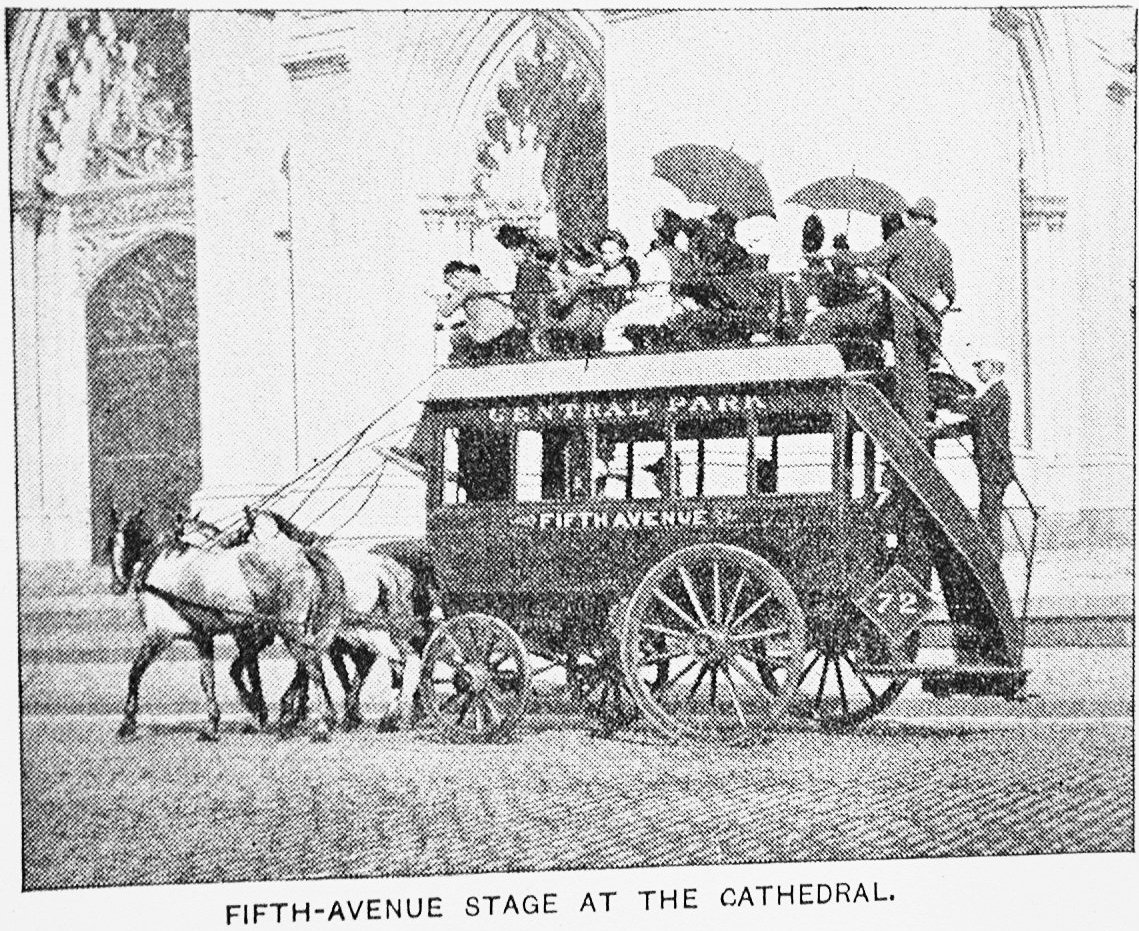
- A Fifth Avenue Transportation Company omnibus to Central Park
- Industry: Transportation
- Founded: 1885; 140 years ago in New York City, United States
- Defunct: 1896
- Fate: Declared for bankruptcy
- Successor: Fifth Avenue Coach Company
- Key people: Elliott Fitch Shepard (controlling stockholder from 1888 to 1893)

The Fifth Avenue Transportation Company was a transportation company based in New York which was founded in 1885 and operated of horse-and-omnnibus transit along Fifth Avenue, with a route running from 89th Street to Bleecker Street using horse-drawn omnibuses. Fifth Avenue was unusual in that its residents opposed the installation of railway track for streetcars and was the only avenue in Manhattan to never see streetcar service. The company was declared bankrupt of the earlier operator in 1896, and was succeeded by the Fifth Avenue Coach Company

From 1888 until his death in 1893, lawyer Elliott Fitch Shepard was the company's controlling stockholder. He acted on his religious beliefs of the holiness of the Christian Sabbath, forcing the company to halt its operations on Sunday, the Sabbath.
