= Fifth Avenue Coach Company =

Defunct bus company in the New York metropolitan area

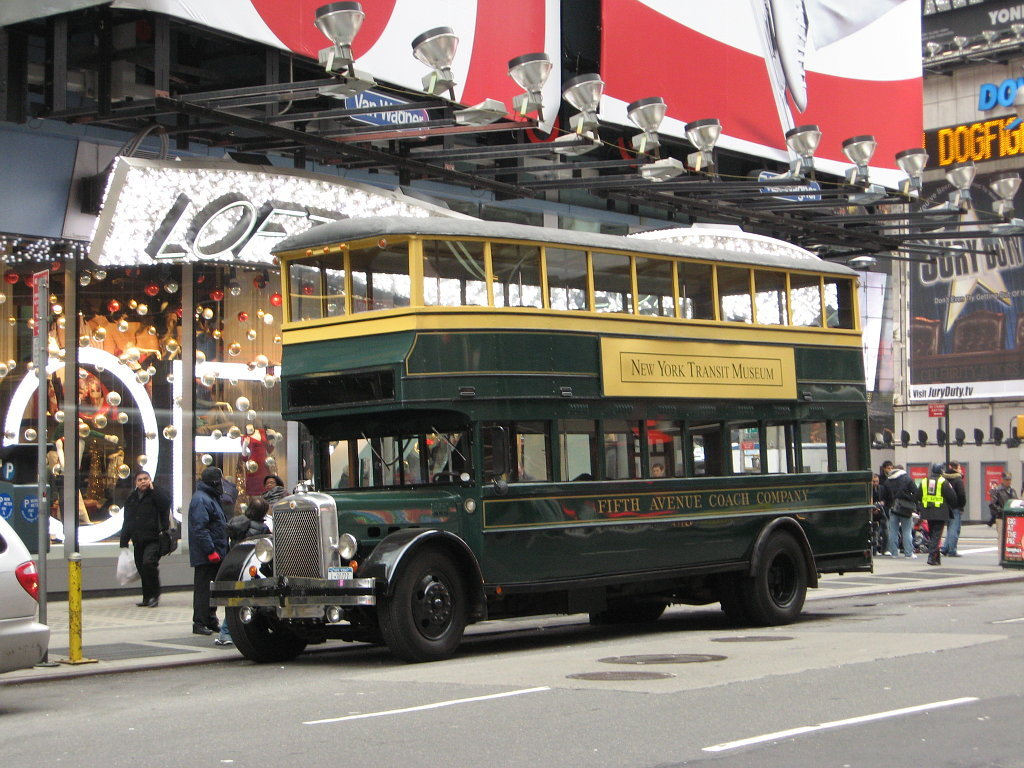
- FACCO Yellow Coach #1263, which ran from 1931 to 1953, and for other operators for 50+ years afterward throughout the US and Canada, preserved by the New York Transit Museum and on display near Times Square in Manhattan.
- Parent: See the article
- Founded: 1896; 129 years ago
- Defunct: 1962; 63 years ago
- Headquarters: 605 West 132nd Street; New York, NY
- Locale: Greater New York
- Service area: Manhattan, Queens, The Bronx, and Westchester County
- Service type: Local bus transit

The Fifth Avenue Coach Company was a bus operator in Manhattan, The Bronx, Queens, and Westchester County, New York, providing public transit between 1896 and 1954 after which services were taken over by the New York City Omnibus Corporation. It succeeded the Fifth Avenue Transportation Company.

== History ==
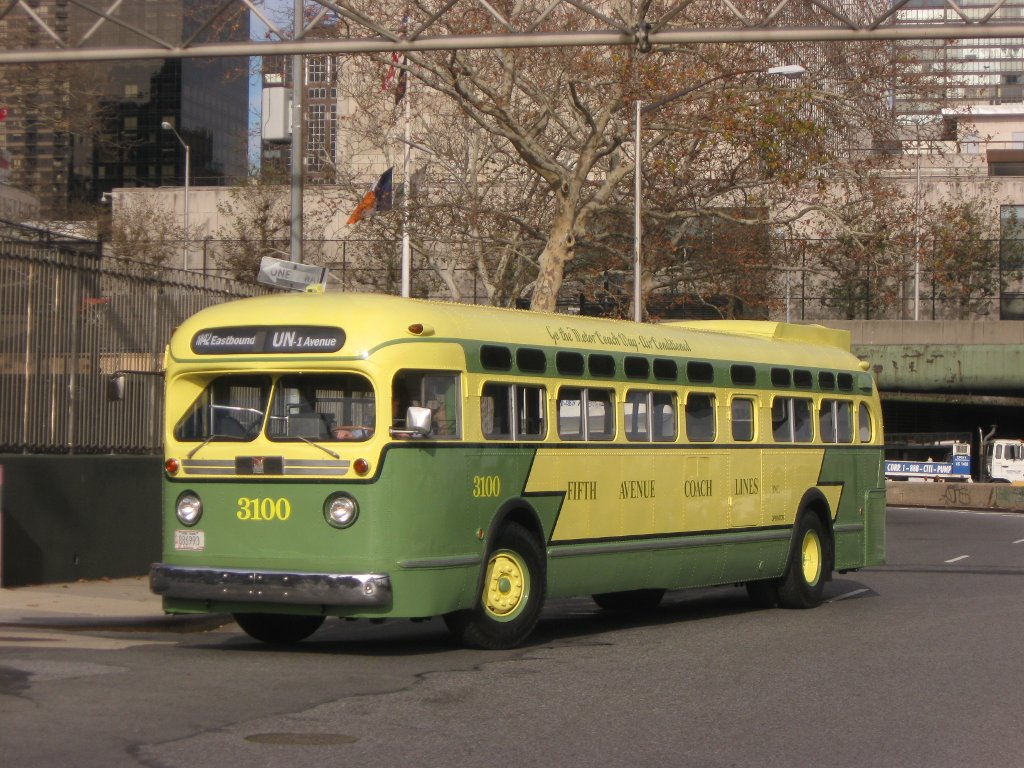
A single-deck Fifth Avenue Coach bus operated in the late 1950s, running here in special holiday service in November 2009.

The company was founded in 1896 when it succeeded the bankrupt Fifth Avenue Transportation Company. It initially operated existing horse-and-omnibus transit along Fifth Avenue, with a route running from 89th Street to Bleecker Street. Fifth Avenue is the only avenue in Manhattan never to see streetcar service due to the opposition of residents to the installation of railway track for streetcars. The company introduced electric buses two years later and was acquired by the newly formed New York Transportation Company in 1899.

They introduced a fleet of 15 of their own motorbuses in 1907 that operated along Fifth Avenue and on some crosstown routes. The company became independent of the New York Transportation Company in 1912.

In 1925, the year that they came under control of The Omnibus Corporation, the company purchased a majority share in the New York Railways Corporation.

When the New York Railways Corporation started converting streetcar lines to buses in 1935–36, the new replacement bus services were operated by the New York City Omnibus Corporation, which had been formed in 1926 and had shared management with The Omnibus Corporation. New York Railways Corporation was dissolved in 1936.

The New York and Harlem Railroad trolleys were replaced by Madison Avenue Coach Company, Inc. buses, and the Eighth and Ninth Avenue Railway trolleys by Eighth Avenue Coach Corporation buses, both companies owned by Fifth Avenue Coach. (Fourth and Madison Avenues; 86th Street Crosstown was not replaced with buses). Madison Avenue Coach and Eighth Avenue Coach were folded into New York City Omnibus in November 1951.

In 1954, The Omnibus Corporation sold the Fifth Avenue Coach Company to the New York City Omnibus Corporation which changed its name to Fifth Avenue Coach Lines two years later. In 1956, the company also acquired the Westchester Street Transportation Company, a bus company previously affiliated with the Third Avenue Railway. The same year, they also acquired the Surface Transportation Corporation, and allowed it to operate under a new name as a subsidiary of Fifth Avenue. After a strike in 1962, and a fight for control with financier Harry Weinberg, bus operations were taken over by the city. Buses in Westchester survived the strike and city takeover until they were acquired by Liberty Lines Transit in 1969.

== Routes ==
The routes that were operated by the Fifth Avenue Coach Company are listed below.

Route	Terminal A	Major streets of travel	Terminal B
1	Washington Square Park	Fifth Avenue	Harlem; 5 Avenue/138 Street
2	Madison Square	Fifth Avenue; Seventh Avenue (today's Adam Clayton Powell Boulevard); Edgecombe Avenue	Washington Heights; Broadway/167 Street
3	Washington Square Park	Fifth Avenue; St. Nicholas Avenue or Convent Avenue (within Hamilton Heights); St. Nicholas Avenue (within Washington Heights)	Washington Heights; St. Nicholas Avenue/193 Street
4	New York Penn Station	Fifth Avenue; Central Park North/Cathedral Parkway; Riverside Drive; Broadway; Fort Washington Avenue	The Cloisters
5/19	Washington Square Park	Fifth Avenue; West 57 Street; Broadway; Riverside Drive (through the Upper West Side); Broadway (5 through Hamilton Heights); Riverside Drive (19 through Hamilton Heights)	Washington Heights; Broadway/167 Street
6	Upper West Side; West 72 Street; Central Park West	Broadway; West 57 Street; Fifth Avenue; East 72 Street	Yorkville; East 72 Street/York Avenue
9	Washington Square Park	Fifth Avenue; West 57 Street; Broadway	Upper West Side; West 72 Street; Central Park West
15	Madison Square	Fifth Avenue; Queensboro Bridge; Queens Boulevard; Roosevelt Avenue	Jackson Heights Northern Boulevard/81 Street; or: Corona Flushing Meadows–Corona Park
16	Jackson Heights; Northern Boulevard/81 Street	81/82 Streets; Baxter Avenue; Broadway	Elmhurst; Broadway and Queens Boulevard
20	Hell's Kitchen; 12 Avenue/West 55 Street	57 Street Crosstown	Sutton Place; Sutton Place and East 59 Street

== See also ==
- Manhattan and Bronx Surface Transit Operating Authority, successor to FACCST within New York City
- Liberty Lines Transit, Inc., successor to the FACCST routes in Westchester County
