= New York City Omnibus Corporation =

Defunct bus company in New York City

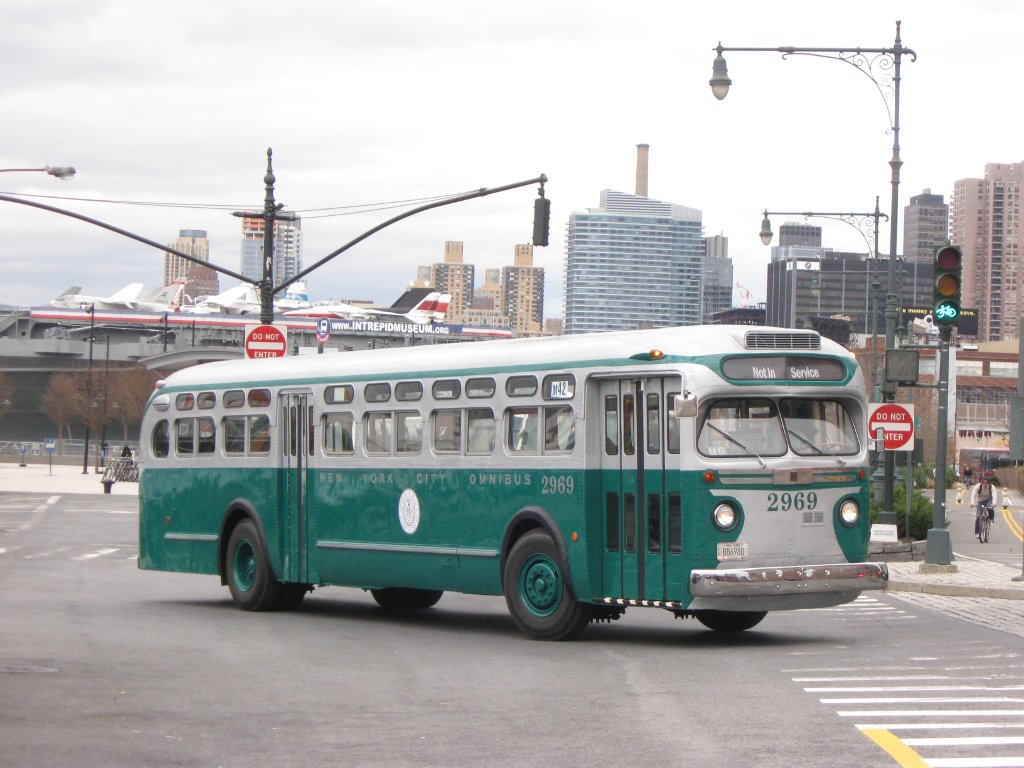
- A restored New York City Omnibus 1948 GMC Bus at the Circle Line terminal in 2009 This is NYC Transit originally fleet no. 4789 renumbered to represent NYCO 2969 and lettered New York City Omnibus for historical reasons. The original 2969 was a GM TDH 4509 a year or so newer than the bus in the photo. The original ran in a simpler green and yellow scheme, later repainted two tone green under MaBSTOA. The original was retired after 1966, but some buses of this class ran on and off as needed until early 1970.
- Founded: 1926
- Ceased operation: 1962
- Defunct: Yes
- Headquarters: New York City
- Locale: Manhattan & Queens
- Service type: Bus
- Routes: 23
- Stops: Civic Center; Astor Place; Gramercy Park; South Ferry; Tribeca; SoHo; Greenwich Village; Abingdon Square; Chelsea; Clinton; Upper West Side; East Harlem; South Bronx; Harlem; Central Park South; Polo Grounds; Williamsburg Bridge; East Village; Lower East Side; Kips Bay; Murray Hill; Yorkville; Randalls and Wards Islands; Astoria

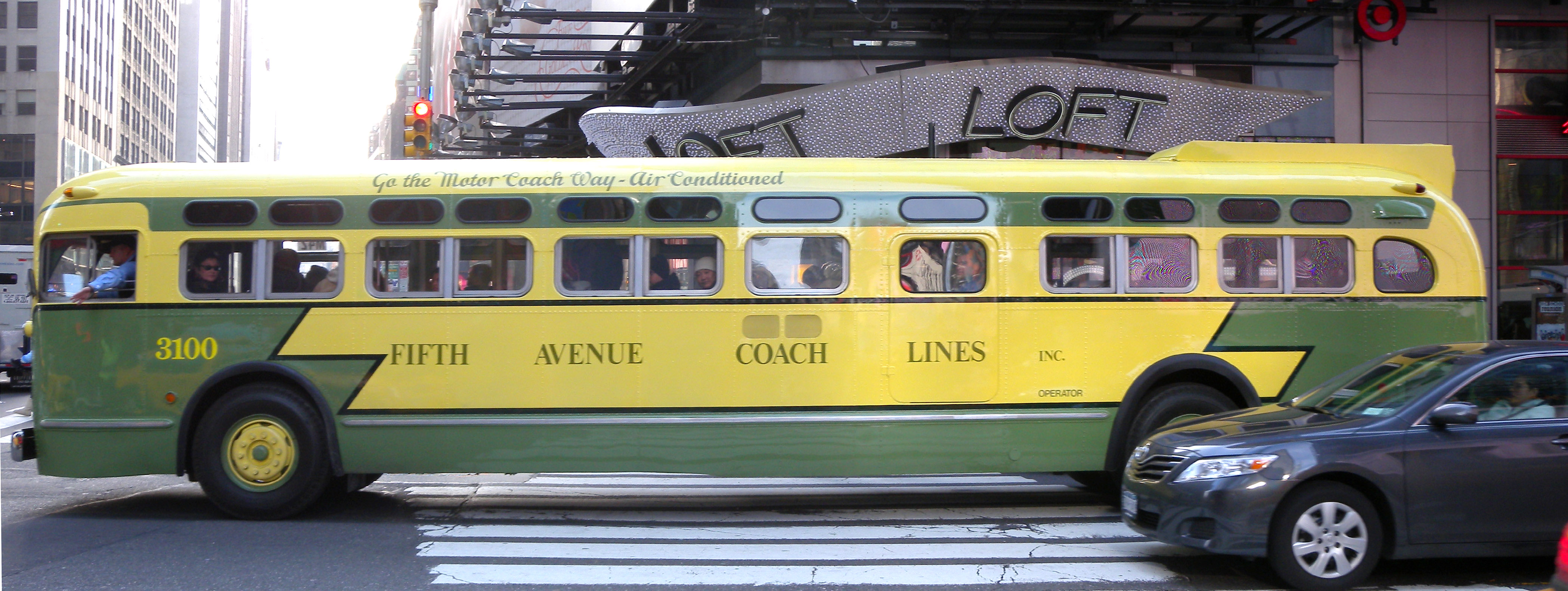
Fifth Avenue Coach Lines bus in special holiday service in Times Square, 2009

The New York City Omnibus Corporation (NYCO, later Fifth Avenue Coach Lines, Inc.) ran bus services in New York City between 1926 and 1962. It expanded in 1935/36 with new bus routes to replace the New York Railways Corporation streetcars when these were dismantled. It further expanded with the acquisition of the Fifth Avenue Coach Company from The Omnibus Corporation in 1954. NYCO was renamed the "Fifth Avenue Coach Lines, Inc." in 1956, becoming bankrupt in 1962, after which operations were taken over by the Manhattan and Bronx Surface Transit Operating Authority.

== History ==
The New York City Omnibus Corporation was formed in 1926 with John A. Ritchie as president. Richie was also president of The Omnibus Corporation founded a year earlier.

The company introduced new bus lines to replace the streetcar lines being withdrawn by the New York Railways Corporation in 1935/36, which The Omnibus Corporation also owned.

In 1954, the company purchased the Fifth Avenue Coach Company from The Omnibus Corporation and renamed itself as "Fifth Avenue Coach Lines, Inc." on May 14, 1956. They also acquired the Third Avenue Railway-owned Surface Transportation Corporation on December 17 that same year, and created an operating subsidiary, Surface Transit, Inc., to administer their routes.

The company went bankrupt in 1962 and the services were taken over by the Manhattan and Bronx Surface Transit Operating Authority.

== Routes ==
The routes that were operated by the New York City Omnibus Corporation are listed below.

Route	Terminal A	Major streets of travel	Terminal B
1/2	Civic Center Park Row/City Hall; or: Astor Place 8 Street/4 Avenue	Fourth Avenue; Madison Avenue (1 via Park Avenue) (2 via Madison Avenue)	Harlem; Madison Avenue/135 Street
3/4	Gramercy Park 23 Street/Lexington Avenue; or: Astor Place 8 Street/4 Avenue	Lexington Avenue (3 and 4); Lenox Avenue (4 only)	East Harlem Lexington Avenue/131 Street; or: Harlem Lenox Avenue/146 Street
5	Civic Center; Park Row/City Hall	Sixth Avenue	Central Park South; 59 Street/6 Avenue
6	South Ferry	Broadway; Seventh Avenue	Central Park South; 59 Street/7 Avenue
7	Gramercy Park; 23 Street/Broadway	Broadway; Columbus Avenue; Lenox Avenue	Harlem; 146 Street/Lenox Avenue
8/9	Tribeca Canal Street/Varick Street; or: Astor Place 8 Street/4 Avenue	Seventh Avenue (8 to Canal and Varick Streets) (9 to 8th Street and 4th Avenue)	Central Park South; 7 Avenue/59 Street
10	SoHo; Cortlandt Street	Eighth Avenue; Central Park West	Polo Grounds; 159 Street/8 Avenue
11	Greenwich Village; Abingdon Square	Ninth Avenue; Amsterdam Avenue	Harlem; La Salle Street/Broadway
12	SoHo; West Street/Watts Street	Spring and Delancey Streets Crosstown	Williamsburg Bridge; Mangin Street/Delancey Street
13	Greenwich Village; West Street/Christopher Street	8 Street Crosstown	East Village; Avenue D/West 10 Street
14	Chelsea; West 22 Street/11 Avenue	14 Street Crosstown	East Village Avenue D/East 14 Street; or: Lower East Side Delancey Street/Essex Street
15	Chelsea; 11 Avenue/West 23 Street	23 Street Crosstown	Kips Bay; FDR Drive/East 23 Street
16	Clinton 12 Avenue/West 34 Street; or: Clinton 12 Avenue/West 42 Street via 8 Avenue	34 Street Crosstown	Murray Hill; 1 Avenue/East 34 Street
17	Upper West Side; West End Avenue/West 79 Street	79 Street Crosstown	Yorkville; East End Avenue/East 79 Street
18	Upper West Side; West End Avenue/West 86 Street	86 Street Crosstown	Yorkville East End Avenue/East 86 Street; or: Yorkville York Avenue/East 91 Street
19	Upper West Side; West End Avenue/West 96 Street	96 Street Crosstown	Yorkville; York Avenue/East 91 Street
20	Upper West Side; West End Avenue/West 106 Street	116 Street Crosstown	East Harlem; FDR Drive/East 116 Street
21	SoHo; West Street/Watts Street	Houston Street and Avenue C Crosstown	Kips Bay; 27 Street/1 Avenue
22	Lower East Side; Clinton Street/South Street	Pitt Street; Ridge Street	Lower East Side; Houston Street/FDR Drive
TB	East Harlem Lexington Avenue/East 125 Street; or: South Bronx 138 Street/Jackson Avenue	Triborough Bridge	Randalls and Wards Islands; or: Astoria 37 Street/24 Avenue
