= 1918–1920 New York City rent strikes =

Historical event

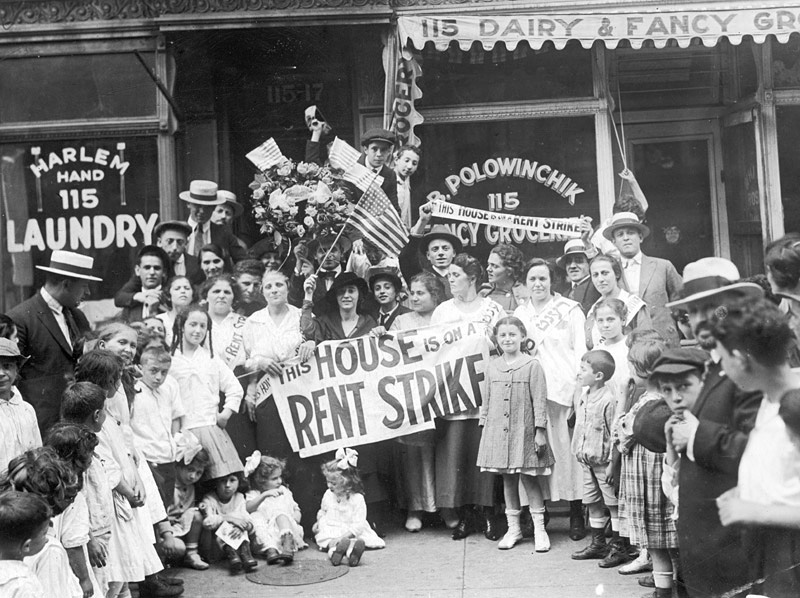
- Tenants standing outside a building in Harlem where all tenants went on strike in September 1919.
- Date: 1918–1920
- Location: New York City and Jersey City
- Caused by: Rent increases and housing shortage, Failure to provide heat and hot water, Use of monthly, oral, unwritten leases
- Goals: Apartment heating; Rent reversals or decreases; Tenant power and protections
- Methods: Rent strike; Picketing; Solidarity actions; Apartment 'boarding'
- Result: Partial tenant union victory: City legal requirement, under health code, for all landlords to provide heating with rent; First rent laws in the US passed by NY State; Rent decreases and eviction reversals won by many individual unions; Passage of new tenant eviction protections; Increased political legitimacy of tenant advocacy

Parties
Tenants; Socialist Party of America; Greater NY Tenants League (Note: (25,000 Members)) Bronx Tenants League Washington Heights Tenants League Williamsburg Tenant League; Workmen's Consumer League of Brownsville; Brownsville Tenant League; Socialist Consumer League; East Side Tenants League; Brooklyn Tenants Union; Harlem Tenants League (Note: First formation of it, different from the one formed in 1928); Yorkville Tenant Union	Landlords; Greater New York Taxpayers Association (GNYTA) United Real Estate Owners Association (UREO): Realtors; Real Estate Board of New York (REBNY): Police; Magistrates

Lead figures
	John Francis Hylan

Number
10,000s to 100,000s of striking tenants	

Casualties and losses
Many arrests and evictions	

The rent strikes of 1918–1920 were some of the most significant tenant mobilizations against landlords in New York City history. (Note: lawson 1986a, p. 51.) A housing shortage caused by World War I had exacerbated tenant conditions, with the construction industry being redirected to support the war effort. In addition, newly available defense jobs attracted thousands of new families to the city, further reducing property vacancy rates. As a result, overcrowding, poor conditions, frequent raising of rents, and speculation by landlords were common. (Note: lawson 1986a, p. 51, 53.) These long-term circumstances, and a nationwide coal shortage that culminated in a dangerous heating crisis for tenants, catalyzed the subsequent organizing and wave of rent strikes across the city.

It is unclear exactly how many tenants were involved in the rent strikes during this period, but strikes were widespread, with poor, middle-working-class, and upper-class families across the city participating. Major newspapers largely covered only a few of the largest and most dramatic strikes. While some statements on the extent the strikes were contradictory, at least several tens of thousands, (Note: At minimum 30,000+ based on available sources (Note: lawson 1986a, p. 63, 75.) (Note: Day 1999, p. 100,103.) (Note: copeland 2000, p. 8.) (Note: copeland 2000.)) and likely hundreds of thousands of tenants, struck across the city over the two-year period. The strikes affected hundreds, potentially even thousands, of apartment buildings in New York City.

Overall, the wave of rent strikes had notable implications. It led to the passage of the NY April and Emergency Rent Laws, and caused a fundamental shift in tenant-landlord relations. Many strikes were successful in reversing rent increases and winning concessions for tenants. The strikes would lay the groundwork for the city's rent strikes during the Great Depression. (Note: lawson 1986a.)

== Background ==
=== Lease structure ===
Very few tenants in New York City had written housing leases at this time. (Note: lawson 1986a, p. 55.) (Note: copeland 2000, p. 5.) Instead, the vast majority of tenants depended on oral leases, a practice that existed under common law that had the same legal status as written leases. Importantly, an old statute reenacted in 1896, stated that leases of unspecified duration would expire on May 1 annually. For this reason, a tenant could legally challenge a landlord who asked for a rent increase on October 1 on the grounds they had oral agreements that fixed the price of the rent until April 30.

However, landlords would later use the lack of written agreements to justify not providing certain services, which would cause the period's first rent strikes. The protection of tenant lease lengths in unwritten agreements would also be removed during the very beginning of the rent strike wave in April 1918 with the Ottinger (Note: Nicknamed after its sponsor, Albert E. Ottinger) law, opening the floodgates for monthly rent increases.

==== 'Lessees' system ====
In New York, there existed two distinct forms of landlords: property owners and property leaseholders, or 'lessees'. The owners, rather than operate the building themselves, often left the work to lessee landlords through a system of subleasing. Lessees would pay a fixed yearly fee and then collect the rents, and keep a percentage of the rent collected. This often added a double burden on the renter in terms of costs. It also allowed property owners to distance themselves from the poor conditions of tenement housing. A full three-fourths of tenement housing was managed by lessees. (Note: lawson 1986a, p. 54.)

Lessees were often tenants without sufficient money to become a landlord themselves, typically living in the same building as those they collected rent from. They were largely hated and tenants saw them as traitors. Lessees commonly increased rents and cut services. The lessee system was often blamed as the cause of the crisis by landlord owners, and as an aggravating factor by tenants.

=== Earlier strikes and protests ===
In both 1904 and 1907, cross-building rent strikes occurred in New York City. The strikes were primarily concentrated within the Lower East Side and led by local Jewish immigrant women in response to rent increases in conjunction with harsh economic conditions. Between 1904 and 1916, a few other individual building strikes also occurred in the city.

In 1900, the Lower East Side was reportedly one of the most densely populated places on Earth, with over 700 inhabitants per acre (1,700/ha). Most buildings were shabbily built, fire trap, multifamily tenements that lacked proper sanitation. Both strikes were firmly rooted and facilitated by the local social networks created by the women who lived in the neighborhood.

For both strikes, the Socialist Party of America provided support and became involved after the strikes had begun. The party was primarily composed of men, although women were crucial to the movement and at forefront of grassroots organizing and local associations. Then, as more hierarchical, broader organizations joined, the movements became primarily composed of men in leadership positions, despite women working as the vast majority of organizers. The cause of this can be broadly attributed to structural sexism and persistent gender roles, which often blocked initial access to leadership roles. After a structure integrated with a movement, however, women would slowly fill its leadership positions.

The organizational capacity and experience gained from these strikes, such as the newly formed building organizations, neighborhoods organizations, and tenant leagues, helped support later NYC rent strikes.

==== 1916 Harlem housing protest ====
In late 1916, facing rising rents and poor housing conditions, tenants in Harlem started organizing a community led campaign against extortion by landlords. The organizing was led by Black Women in the community, with a series of mass meetings of black & white tenants, the Urban League and other community organizations.

On October 2, 1916, Mrs.Winnie Jones and the tenants of 143rd street, between 7th & 8th Avenues, formed the Neighborhood Association (NA), intending to raise funds for a campaign against "extortionate rentals which are being forced upon them by both colored and white agents [landlords & real estate agents]".

William McNichols of the Negro Civic Improvement League (NCIL) joined the NA, and collected rent receipts from and then compared the rents being charged between white and black tenants. Both white and black tenants opposed the actions of the landlords.

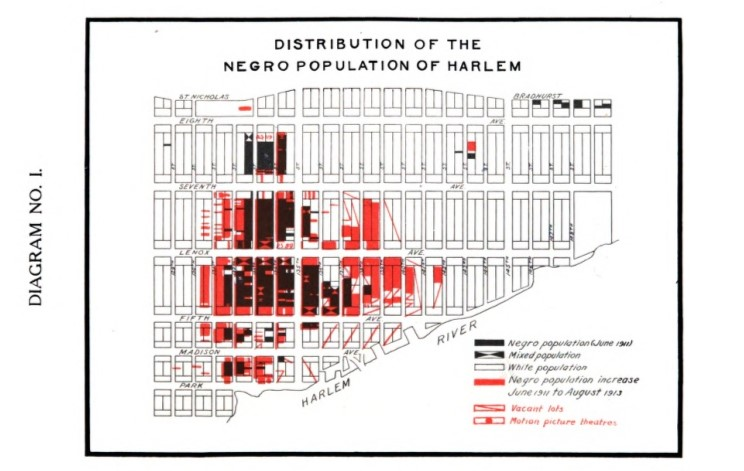
A 1915 report titled Housing Conditions Among Negroes In Harlem, New York City by the National Urban League highlighting residential segregation.

One common tactic by landlords relied on existing residential segregation to increase rents. Because black tenants had fewer options, they could often be forced to pay higher rents then white tenants. Often landlords would increase the rents of white tenants hoping they would leave for cheaper housing, or evicted them to charge black tenants higher rents. One petition by white tenants in Harlem stated on this issue that it was, "unfair to be forced to move when they have no objection to living in adjacent houses to their colored neighbor... We understand that the whole scheme is to obtain more rents for the apartments, which, it is claimed, colored people are willing to pay."

A mass meeting was held in October, 1916 at Public School 89, at 135th St. & Lenox Avenue, where more than 1,500 people attended to protest the increasing rentals and confronted landlords and real estate agents of Harlem. The meeting was later seen as a success, with one black and one white landlord reducing their rents from $1 to $3 per apartment. The meeting also further empowered the tenants to challenge negligent landlords in court.

In November, when the Grohem Brother realty firm failed to provide heat to building tenants, they filled a complaint with the National Urban League, which then tenant organizer Mrs. C. DeSilva collected signatures to be presented to the owner Cassel Cohen. However, before the petition was submitted heat was turned on but, with a notice rent would be raised $1 to $3 an apartment. Tenants heavily protested against this and sent another petition. The Grohem Brothers realty firm attempted to intimidate tenants who signed the petition, targeting tenant organizer Mrs. C DeSilva in particular, serving her a eviction notice. In response the New York Age, a Black newspaper provided her immediately with legal counsel. Grohem attempted after court to offer DeSilva the option to remain in the apartment at $20/month if she paid the one dollar cost of the eviction warrant, in an attempt to stop her tenant organizing. She refused.

The tenants continued holding mass meetings, in total lasting for 3 months. At one of these meetings Black realtor John M. Royall, complained about the tenants organizing saying, “it was nothing but a socialist idea or grafting scheme.”, many tenants decried such statements as the complicity of black realtors in oppressing black Harlemites. While short-lived, the protests set up the political networks tenants would use later on.

==== 1917 Crotona Park rent strike ====
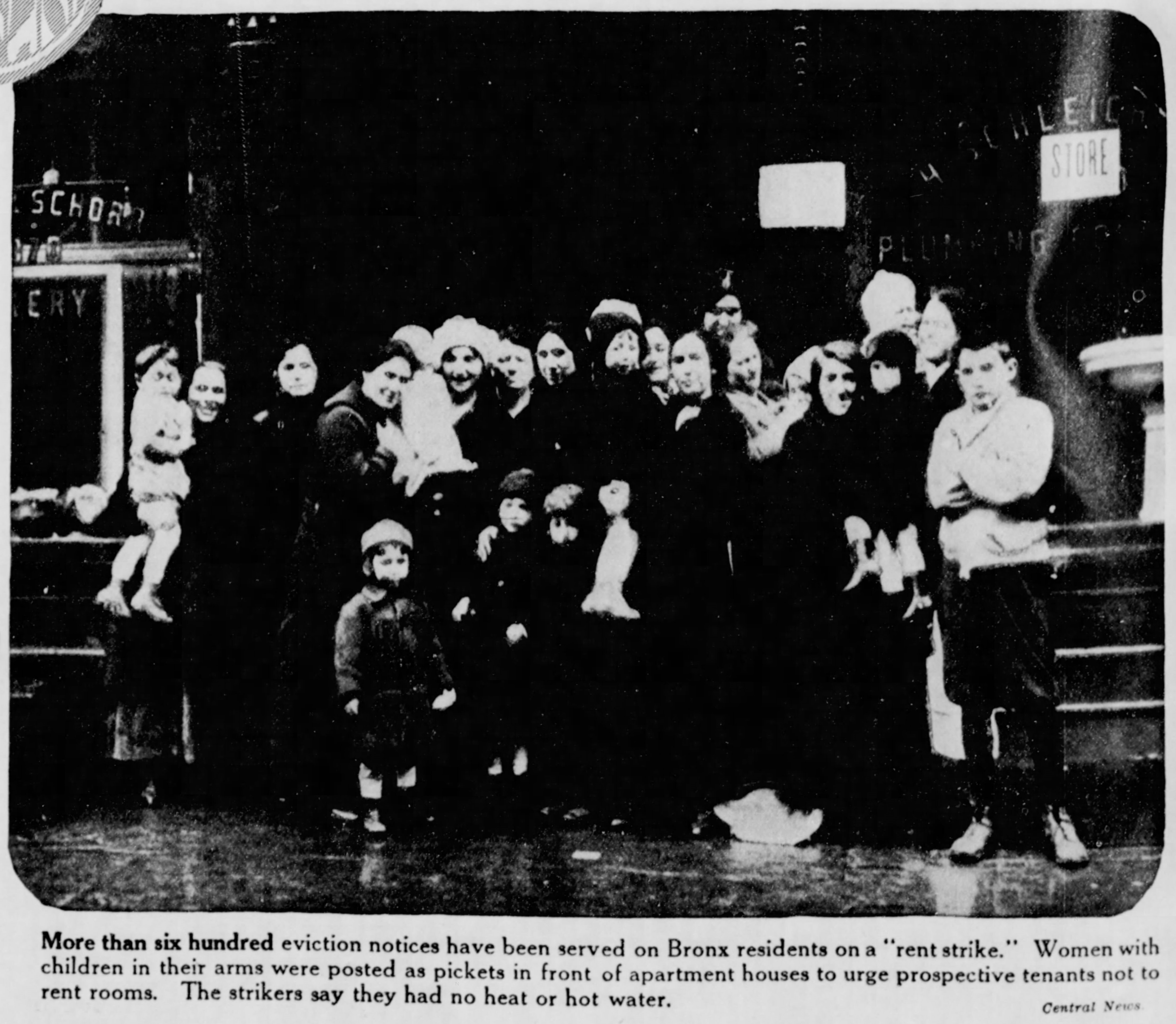

In January 1917, tenants living near Crotona Park in the Bronx held a rent strike. The neighborhood mostly consisted of lower-class residents, with a large immigrant population of Russian Jewish (Note: This could also more broadly mean Eastern European Jewish immigrant families. Jewish Working Class in America notes that many academic texts often mistakenly conflate the two; When many were originally from villages, towns, and industrializing cities within the Lithuanian commonwealth and Kingdom of Poland within the Russian Empire, or the Austria-Hungarian Galicia Region.) families. Many of them had moved out from the Lower East Side in search of better tenement conditions and they often had trouble paying rent due to their precarious position. It became significantly more difficult to pay rent in 1917 after repeated rent increases, and landlords' failure to provide heat and hot water that year. Around 500 to 1,000 residents across 25 buildings organized in late December 1916 through the Socialist Women's Consumer League of the Bronx. The January rent increase would have been the third in four months.

Theresa Malkiel, a member of the Socialist Party and a suffragist, urged the tenants to reject the rent increase demand effective January 1, 1917, which they did, refusing to pay rent until heat and hot water returned. The Bronx Tenants Protective Association was formed by tenants during this time, and they collected a small strike fund and organized a picket force of women for the apartments. Leon Malkiel, a Socialist lawyer and husband of Theresa Malkiel, agreed to help defend them in court. (Note: copeland 2000, p. 18–19.) Landlords responded with eviction notices. They also eventually reduced the rent hike from $2 to $1 per month, which some of the tenants accepted. The strike did not break until after the first cases had been ruled on in court. (Note: lawson 1986a, p. 54-55.)

On January 5, 1917, 296 tenants were ordered to pay the set rent for their flats, without heat, or leave. (Note: copeland 2000, p. 24.) By January 11, most striking tenants had reportedly been ordered to pay their rents or leave the building. Despite this, members of the association continued their efforts and, on January 17, they held a meeting that formally established the Bronx Tenants League through the enrollment of 150 charter members, and announced plans to form affiliates in all the city's boroughs. However, it seems that no other major rent strikes occurred in New York City that year. The Bronx Tenant League and other associations often modeled themselves on the principles of trade unionism. Members carried union cards, walked picket lines, and spoke in terms describing class conflict, which also often gave them access to New York's union network. (Note: copeland 2000, p. 19–20.) The Bronx Tenant League would become an important, central organizing body for striking tenants across the city during the early stages of the 1918–1920 rent strikes and remained prominent throughout.

== Strikes ==
=== 1918 ===
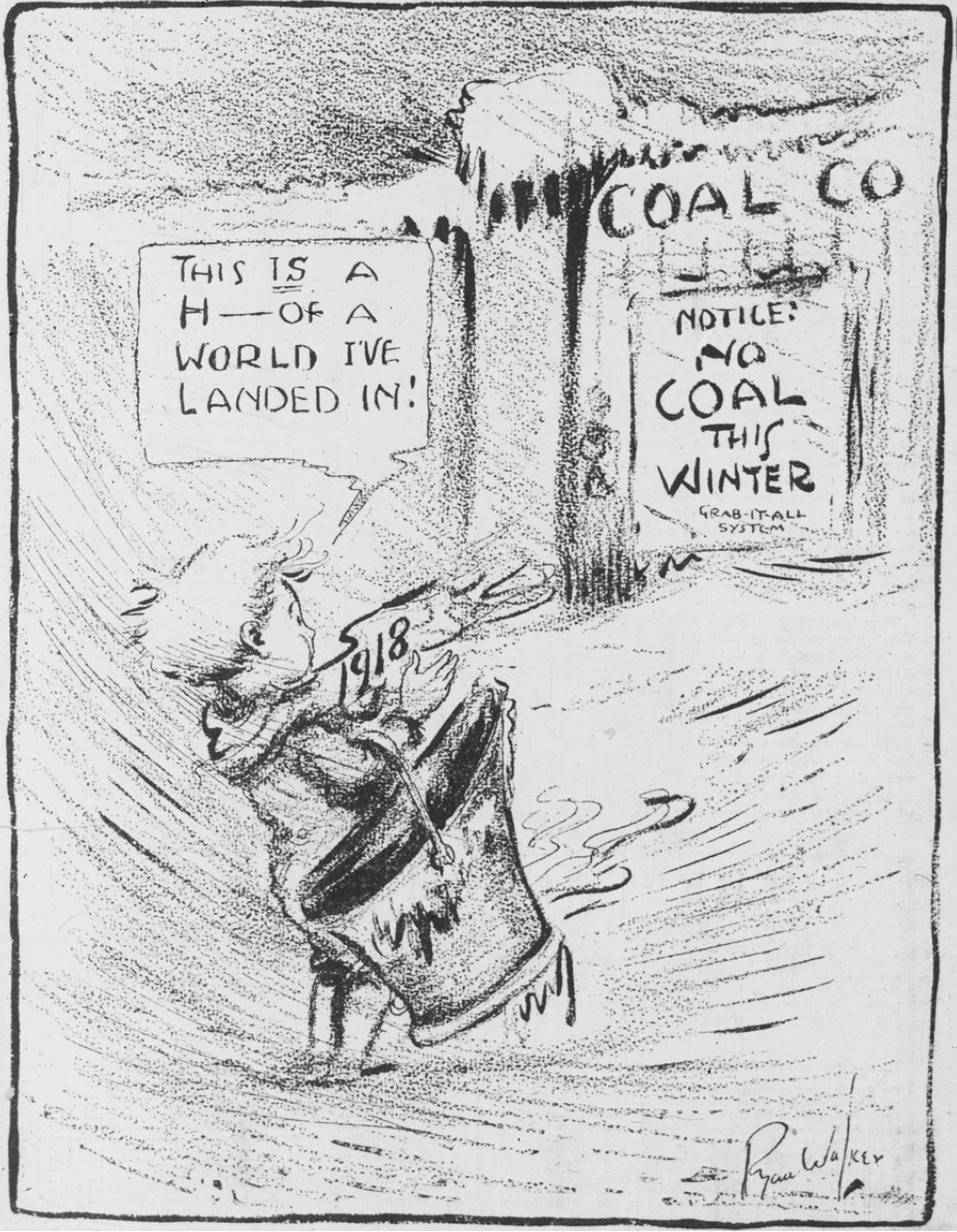
"No Coal This Winter", December 30, 1917

The strike wave had roots in a heating crisis that occurred in the city in late 1917. The early winter months of 1918 especially were characterized by a particularly severe coal shortage across the country as a result of World War I fuel rationing. New York City was hit the hardest by the shortage because of its lack of long-term local coal stockpiles. This was worsened further by the abnormally cold winter in New York City that year. The lack of coal would become one of the main motives for the early rent strikes because landlords stopped providing heating.

Alongside the coal crisis, landlords had more leverage over tenants to raise rents than they had had in decades. The World War I redirection of the construction industry to war efforts had caused a housing shortage. New defense jobs also attracted thousands of new families to the city, further reducing property vacancy rates. Under these conditions, landlords frequently raised rents and speculated on land.

In early February, the County Fuel Administrator noted, "the zero whether has ... frozen the rivers, the kills, and the slips so that it is well neigh impossible to move coal barges". The rivers from due to an atypically cold 1917–18 winter, worsening the already acute crisis. The coal that did arrive on trains in New Jersey was often frozen solid, and had to be thawed before it could be loaded onto barges and taken into the city.

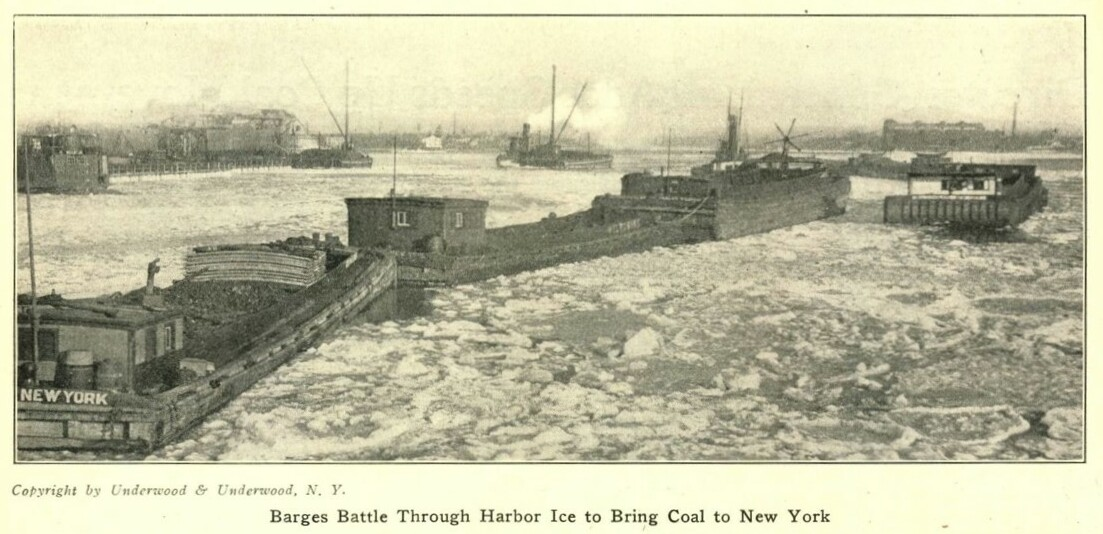
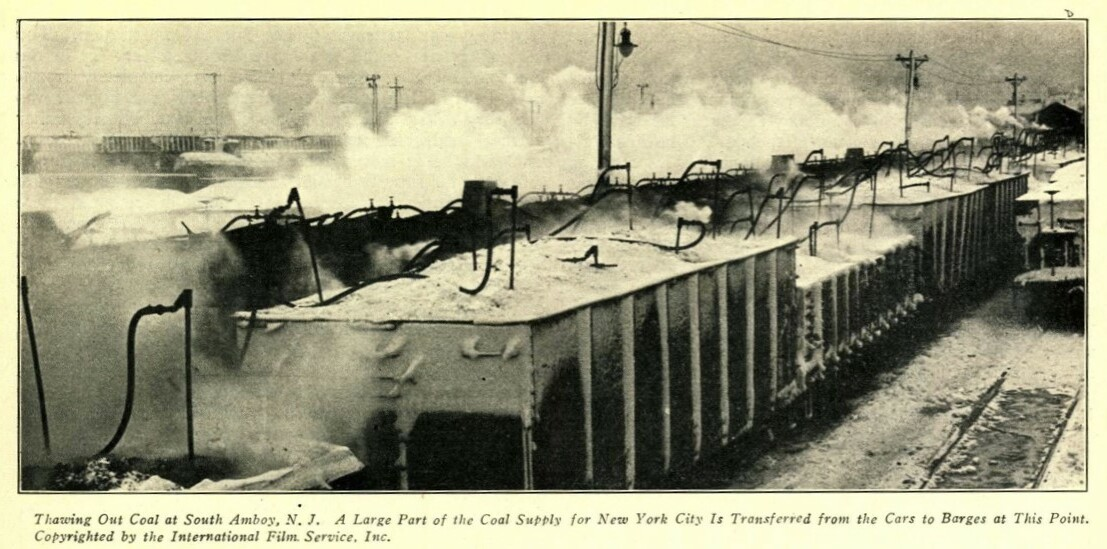

Thousand died of pneumonia and other respiratory diseases, and hundreds got frostbite as a result of the coal shortage. A third of all apartments were without any coal. One social worker described the situation in the tenements, which housed the poorest residents in the city.

"Conditions are beyond description. Gas is frozen, homes are dark, no water in the toilets, sanitary conditions unspeakable, faces blue and pinched from the bitter cold and ever so many kiddies down with pneumonia."

In this period, the vast majority of New York City tenants had oral, not written, leases, with certain protections established for oral lease lengths. Previously, it was standard for landlords to provide coal, which was cheap to provide before the shortage, without extra costs to middle- to upper-working-class tenants. However, there was no legal requirement for landlords to provide heating without an agreement in the lease. In practice, a judge would only rule that a landlord was required to provide heating if it was stipulated in a written lease. Tenants' initial attempts at resolution through courts, suing for breach of contract, failed.

The coal shortage affected not just poorer tenants, but also the middle- to upper-class tenants. As a result of the crisis, tenant organizations started forming. Tenants in the Bronx and elsewhere started withholding portions of rent to cover the personal cost of heating or to compensate for the cold, poor and middle-class tenants alike. Many bought gas heaters and fuel to run them, and deducted that cost from rent. In response, landlords promptly took their tenants to court and threatened evictions.

One early event was reported on January 4, where the newly formed Yorkville tenant union had started a rent strike in response to the lack of any steam heating. Similarly, when a rent strike was occurred in the Bronx, on January 29, the Federation of Bronx Property Owners issued an ultimatum to 4,000 tenants in a printed notice,

"Your rent pays for the room you occupy. Not for steam, heat or hot water. Agree to this or vacate!"

In addition to being a response to the rent strike, the stated goal by the Great New York Taxpayers Association (GNYTA)—the major landlord association, which had instructed its members (Note: Including the Federation of Bronx Property Owners) to distribute notices across the city to their tenants—was to form an additional legal basis for not providing heat. (Note: Day 1999, p. 100–01.) The Bronx Tenants League, (Note: Formed in the early 1917 Crotona Park strike) whose members were withholding rent, then called a mass meeting in response for January 31, and were rallying around the slogan, "No Heat, No Rent". The tenants would win rent reductions in court.

Early on, following the start of rent strikes, judges began ruling against landlords. In a prominent case, Austin Wall won after his landlord had sued him for nonpayment of January rent. The lease was written with a guarantee of heat and hot water, and he argued that failure to provide heat forced him to buy a gas heater, which he then deducted from rent. The judge ruled in his favor, allowing the deduction, and other judges had also started ruling ad hoc in favor of tenants. A few days later, in mid-January, the New York Supreme Court ruled in favor of oral lease tenants, stating that, even in cases with no agreement, if the facilities existed in the tenement, the landlord had to provide heat. (Note: Day 1999, p. 98, 214.)

In Williamsburg, a young Socialist lawyer, Joseph Klein, ended up winning a succession of rent cases in municipal courts starting in February. Then, in early, March he began to organize buildings. By April, he had established the Williamsburg Tenants League, and threatened to lead a widespread general rent strike against all profiteering landlords. (Note: lawson 1986a, p. 56, 90.) (Note: Day 1999, p. 139.)

In February, Socialist politician of the New York State Assembly and tenant activist Samuel Orr introduced a bill that would require landlords to keep tenements at 68 °F (20 °C) from October to April, with any landlords who failed to do so being denied the benefits of summary eviction proceedings laws. That same month, the Washington Heights Tenants League was formed. Its goal was to ensure heat in the buildings, but the League also more broadly stated its intent to fight for tenant rights beyond heating. (Note: Day 1999, p. 98–99, 214.) Clarence Y. Palitz, a lawyer who had represented hundreds of tenants in Bronx and a Democratic alderman, noted that with the coal shortage, five out of six tenants in Manhattan and Bronx relied exclusively on steam heat, a form of central heating that could only be provided by the landlord. Meanwhile, the heat bills proposed to mitigate the crisis during this early period ended up being killed in assembly, but had the effect of further publicizing the issue. (Note: lawson 1986a, p. 56.)

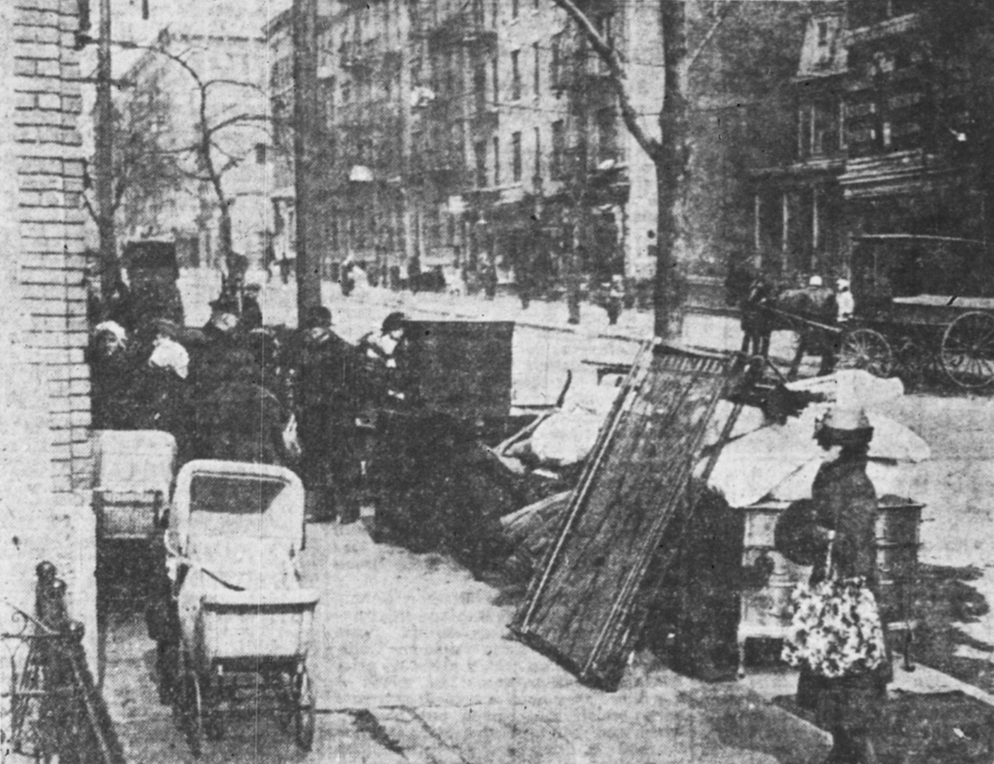
"They Asked Heat and Got This" - Published February 20, 1918

While the courts' heat rulings were favorable for tenants, their effect was ultimately limited. Such rulings did not exhaust landlords legal or extra-legal options. Most notably, no-cause eviction, in which a landlord could evict any tenants they deemed undesirable, including those paying rent and without needing to prove fault in court, remained the law. (Note: Day 1999, p. 101.) (Note: lawson 1986a, p. 72.) Eight families in the Bronx who paid rent but complained about the lack of heat received no-cause eviction notices from their landlords in late February. They were given five days to move out, after which their furniture was placed in the street. (Note: Day 1999, p. 101–02, 215.)

==== The 'Reign of Terror' ====
In February and April, around 1,000 tenants of the Brownsville (Note: Similar to the Lower East Side, Brownsville was largely made up of tenement housing, which had worse conditions and housed the poorer families within NYC compared to the more expensive apartment housing.) Workmen's Consumer League (BWCL) staged periodic strikes against rent rather than heat. Rent had been raised multiple times that year, going from $14 to $23 per month. This incited a more violent phase of the conflict. (Note: Day 1999, p. 103.) (Note: lawson 1986a, p. 57.)

Facing unfavorable court rulings, landlords began organizing into local group organizations and started using police, city marshals, and hired gangs of men to break the rent strikes. This period would be dubbed by tenant activists as the landlords' "reign of terror", which would last well into 1919. During the early BWCL strikes, landlords were accompanied by his lawyers and police to several of the tenements, and ordered the arrest of some of the strike leaders. Landlords had critical allies in the municipal police: Brownsville Chief Issac Frank openly sided with them, and began a campaign to undermine the GYNTL, arresting tenant leaders and attempting to curtail tenants' ability to picket. (Note: Day 1999, p. 104–05.)

The Brownsville tenants had similarly faced a lack of hot water, heat, or gas during the earlier winter months before the strike began, like many across the city, but struck against rents. Aaron Stein was a crucial early organizer, and was evicted by his landlord. While Leo Gitlin, founder of the Brownsville Consumer and Workingmen's League seven years earlier, joined the conflict of renters in January. By March, three to four large apartments were participating in the Brownsville rent strike.

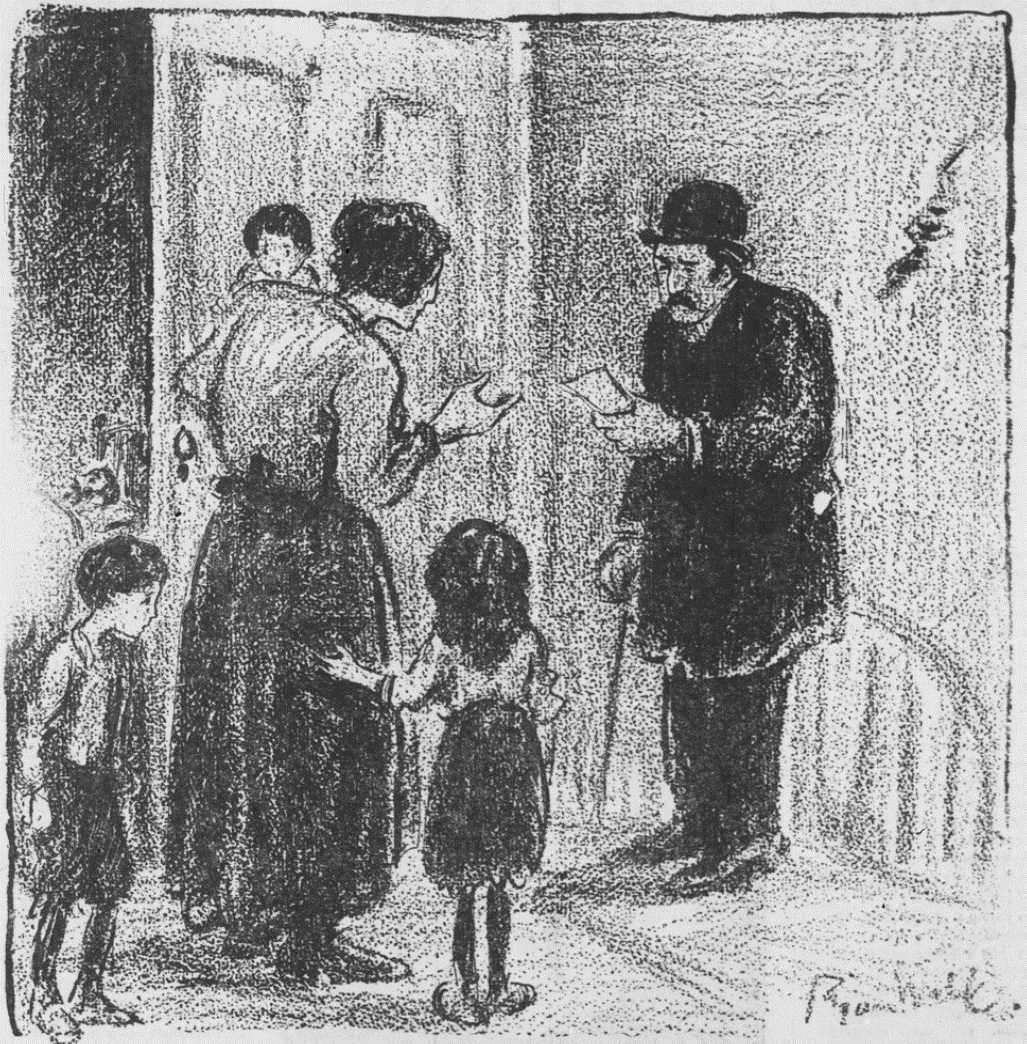
"Rent Day" March 24, 1918

In April, the state of New York enacted the Ottinger Law. The real estate industry strongly supported the bill because it changed existing law so that all oral leases expired automatically at the end of the month unless written otherwise. Previously, under common law, leases without a specified orally agreed date expired on the city's traditional Moving Day of May 1, which often provided some protection against rent raises (Note: (When taken to court)) to NYC tenants on oral leases, who made up the majority of NYC tenants. The law effectively removed this protection, giving landlords the ability to raise rent every month without legal contest. Previously, they had faced legal hurdles, with juries under the former law often ruling against landlords for lease violations. This change exacerbated the housing crisis.

Tenant unions used a variety of tactics to deal with attempts to break their pickets and strikes. (Note: Day 1999, p. 106.) For evicted families, 'boarding' or 'doubling up' was common: a non-evicted family would take another evicted family in to stay in their apartment, often also storing their furniture for them. The evicted family would reside there, and continue picketing the struck apartment. Often, two extra families would be boarding in another's apartment. Picketers often wore sashes stating their apartment complex number, or that they were on rent strike.

An April 9 article in the New York Evening Call describes some of the tactics used during a rent strike in Brownsville. During the strike, one tenement house in the neighborhood sat entirely empty after every tenant had been evicted; meanwhile, courthouses remained crowded with large groups of women holding each of their eviction notices. Entire neighborhood blocks were organized and picketed, filled with a procession of women wheeling baby carriages back and forth in front of struck apartments. Sympathy rent strikes were also a prevalent tactic. While sweeping evictions had been a successful strategy for landlords in breaking the 1907 New York City Rent Strike, this tactic proved ineffective in breaking the 1918–1920 strike. After school, the children of striking families would parade through the neighborhood to gain support from other tenants, singing songs with the following chorus:

"Strike, Strike, Strike!
I'm a striker, you're a striker
Strike, Strike, Strike!"

Police Captain Frank of Brownsville refused to permit the tenants to hold open-air meetings, and prevented them from wearing sashes displaying the address of their struck homes. The Brownsville rent strike in April had 1,000 families participating, surpassing the previous large strikes in the earlier months of 1918, as the result of a landlords demanding a rent increase from $3 to $5 monthly, to be implemented come the end of leases on May 1.

In late May, the major landlord group, the GNYTA began hiring gangs of men to disrupt the picketing women in Brownsville, and seriously wounded one of the picketers in an attempt to provoke a riot. Courts refused to issue warrants against the GNYTA or their hired men. Harassment by GNYTA hired men became common, in some cases escalating into violent battles. GYNTA was not isolated in employing these extralegal tactics—many landlord organizations (Note: The tenement specific landlord organizations, which housed the poorest residents in NYC, were often the most extreme. They were the first to adopt the use of extralegal violent tactics.) utilized harassment and intimidation, and hired vigilantes in attempts to break picket lines and their corresponding rent strikes. (Note: Day 1999, p. 103–104.) This also included the use of illegal self-proclaimed "marshals" in requesting and processing evictions who began appearing in court. Some of these marshals were paid up to $2,000 (equivalent to $37,140 in 2025) a month. (Note: Day 1999, p. 145.)

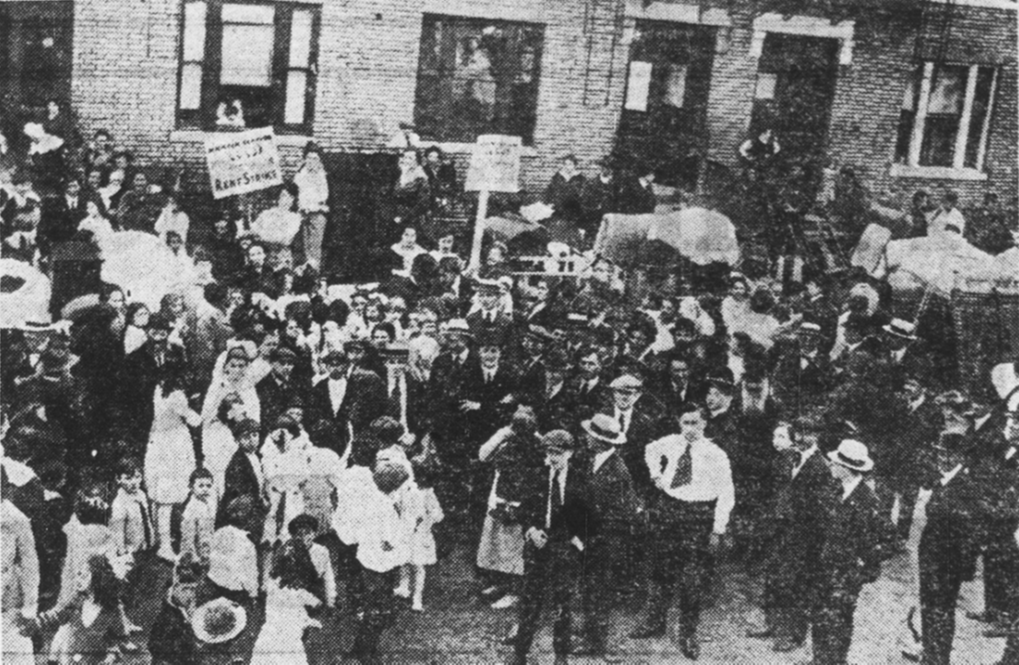
"Evicted Brownsville Rent Strikers Make Their Homes in the Streets", published May 21, 1918

In May, over 1,000 families participated in rent strikes. That month, the Greater New York Tenants League (GNYTL) formed from a merger of the Bronx Tenants League, Washington Heights Tenant League, and Williamsburg Tenants League. (Note: Day 1999, p. 102.) (Note: copeland 2000, p. 18.) They worked alongside the more radical Brownsville tenant unions, broadening their focus to fighting rising rents as the heating crisis subsided with warmer weather.

Alongside rent strikes, they organized certain legislative attempts.Working together with Socialist party members, they called for state reforms to limit rent increases and offer greater tenant legal protections. They met with city Mayor James Hylan who expressed sympathy but did not sufficiently address the crisis. In August of that year, they sent a delegation to Albany to meet Governor Charles Whitman; he ignored their demands. The GNYTL also employed attorneys to help defend tenants in eviction court proceedings and worked to publicize the plight of tenants. It also started hiring people to help organize those who were currently unorganized. For the Bronx the chief organizer for this was Mary Mardfin, a former head secretary of the league and a tenant. (Note: copeland 2000, p. 20.)

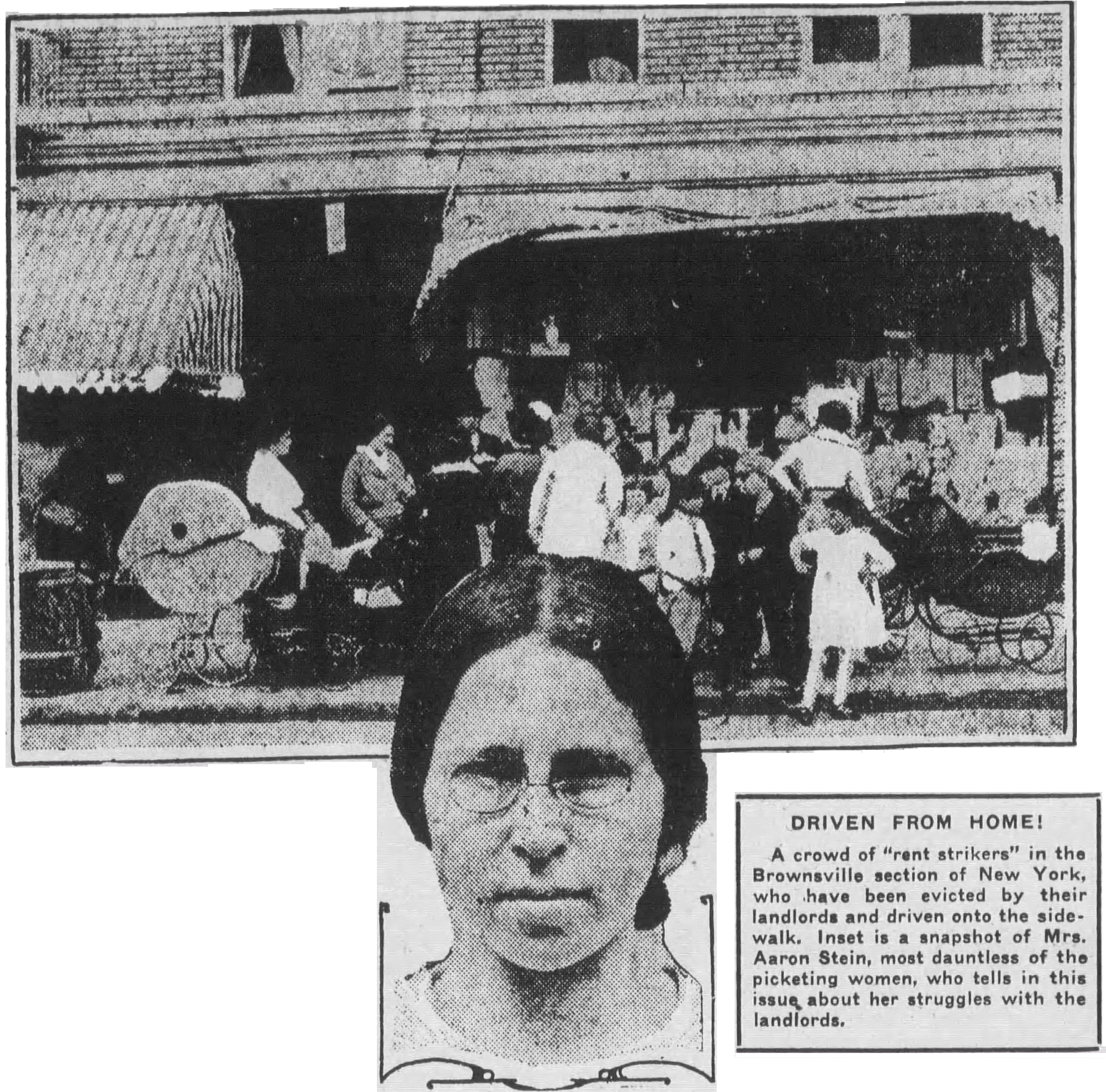
Aaron Stein, one of the tenant leaders of a Brownsville rent strike.
- Published June 1918

A reporter for the Portsmouth Star noted of the Brownsville strike in June,

I found the women of the neighborhood very reticent to talk. They have been so terrorized by policemen and plain-clothes men, and so many have been arrested and fined for "creating a disturbance" or 'obstructing the sidewalk' or have been put on the landlords blacklist and driven from the district, that they are afraid to further air their troubles to strangers.

Aaron Stein said the following,

We seem helpless. Everybody is against us. The policemen tell us that, if we are seen in front of the house, they will take us away in the patrol wagon. One of the judges says we may picket, and another says we mustn't ... The other day a policeman drew an imaginary line across the sidewalk and threatened, if I crossed it, that he would arrest me.

On June 23, the New-York Tribune characterized the cries of "Bolshevik" and "Socialist" directed at picketers as reflective of a contempt for any attempts by workers to better their conditions, rather than a credible indictment of the picketers. The article describes police prodding and badgering picketers until they showed aggression, after which they were arrested and held for six to eight hours. It also mentions that, in response to the vast arrests of calm pickets, tenants started acting more aggressively, with Stein at one point threatening a policemen. Captain Frank is described as forbidding any open-air meetings, and Leo Gitlin's arrest by his police is also detailed. Lastly, the entire group of strikers were evicted by June with all apartment rent strike signs reportedly down, while the committee continued to hold meetings.

Widespread rent strikes similarly occurred across the city in August. That month, the earlier heating rulings that protected rent deductions faced complete rollbacks. First, it was ruled in the appellate court that tenants could only deduct the cost of purchased heaters, not fuel. Shortly after, the court ruled that a landlord's only obligation was to leave tenants in "quiet enjoyment" of the place, completely removing the heat requirement. (Note: Day 1999, p. 107–108.)

By late summer, the continued pressure from landlords, police, and judges had created a relative feeling of desperation among tenants, however they continued to organize and strike. The tenants also expanded their criticisms of landlords over apartment conditions in violation of the health code and landlords' leasing discrimination against families with children.

===== Tenant politics and the November 1918 elections =====
In New York's November elections, the Socialist party faced a series of unexpected losses. There was a significant decline compared to the previous year's election in which the Socialist party won 22% of the mayoral vote, electing ten assemblymen, and seven alderman. This was in part due to them being the only party willing to state their opposition to World War 1. (Note: lawson 1986a, p. 57–58.)

Leading up to these 1918 election, the New York tenant leagues eventually endorsed the Socialist party due to their clear pro-tenant rent policies. However, the Socialist share of the vote declined slightly in most districts because Democrats and Republicans had formed a temporary fusion ticket movement.

Early calls for a fusion ticket movement began in July 1918 by the National Security League's Congressional Campaign Committee, which expected the Socialist party to successfully expand on their 1917 elections wins if the Democrats and Republicans did not strategize to combine their votes. They expected the Socialist party succeed in five city districts (Note: 12th, 20th, 10th, 13th & 14th districts) otherwise. To combat this, they called for only Republicans to run in the highly Socialist strongholds of 10th and 20th Districts, and for Democrats to be allotted the 12th, 13th and 14th Districts, which were seen as likely Socialist wins. Both parties endorsed each other in those districts. President Woodrow Wilson had also voiced their public support of such an action, calling for Democrats to follow it. This agreement was slightly modified and formally ratified later that month by the Republican County Committee and Democratic Tammany Hall executive committee. Republicans would endorse Democrats in the 12th and 13th districts, with them running in the primaries of both parties. Democrats then also agreed to endorse republican candidates in the 14th and 20th districts. Over the following months, the parties negotiated who specifically to nominate from each party for the seats, settling on Fiorello La Guardia for the 14th District for the US House of Representative seat against Socialist party politician Scott Nearing.<

The Socialist share of the vote declined in most districts due to the fusion ticket movement and the war being near its end; (Note: Armistice occurred on November 11, 1918 only a week after the November 5, 1918 elections) 8 of the 10 Socialist party's assemblymen were successfully unseated in this election. This, however, did not cripple the chances of legislation to solve the crisis. Despite many Democrats and Republicans successfully unseating Socialists in their strongholds, the newly elected politicians saw their position as fragile if they did nothing to solve the worsening housing crisis as it worsened, and tenant discontent and action continued. As a result, in early 1919, many non-Socialist politicians started more openly talking about the crisis, especially those who won in Socialist strongholds.

===== Return of heat requirements =====
In December, city health commissioner Royal Copeland amended the health code so that landlords were now required to maintain heat, at 68 °F (20 °C) during normal waking hours in any apartments they rented between October and April, which helped fully solve the issue in the court system. (Note: copeland 2000, p. 25.) (Note: Day 1999, p. 109.) A staff of 50 officers was also mobilized to help enforce the provisions.

=== 1919 ===
Throughout the period of rent strikes across the city, Antisemitism and Red Scare rhetoric became common among statements by public officials and the later-formed conservative tenant advocacy groups. In many cases, this rhetoric characterized landlords as "Bolsheviki Russian Jew Landlords". Striking tenants were often characterized as Jewish immigrants without agency, unaware of American norms who were "tricked" into striking by Socialists. (Note: lawson 1986a, p. 70–72.) That year, laws were also passed that banned waving red flags from striking apartments, and city ordinances banned the use of foreign languages in street meetings. (Note: Day 1999, p. 122, 220.)

In an example emblematic of pervasive bigotry, Fiorello La Guardia at one point shouted at a heckling landlord, "Yes, hiss, my friends. You people who emigrated from the pales of Russia but a short time ago" at a hearing in Albany. Key sections of strikers were Jewish immigrants, primarily within the tenement housing of the Lower East Side and Brownsville. This was a result of the poor and crowded conditions of tenement buildings, relative poverty as immigrants, and the strong community networks that Jewish Immigrant women relied on and further built on during the 1904 and 1907 NYC Rent Strikes, not because socialists had "tricked" the immigrant tenants. The radical politics among many Jewish immigrants, particularly on the Lower East Side and in Brownsville, were longstanding in NYC before the 1918–1920 strikes as intentional responses to deal with rampant discrimination and oppression.

1919 was also characterized by the return of rampant property speculation through real estate curb markets. Tenement owners and lessees would rapidly buy and sell tenements, the buyers would then immediately raise rents, and quickly sell them to another buyer at a higher price, using the higher rent to inflate its value. Those who participated in this practice were known as "leasters" and the practice dramatically increased the rent burden on tenants. (Note: Day 1999, p. 110–111.)

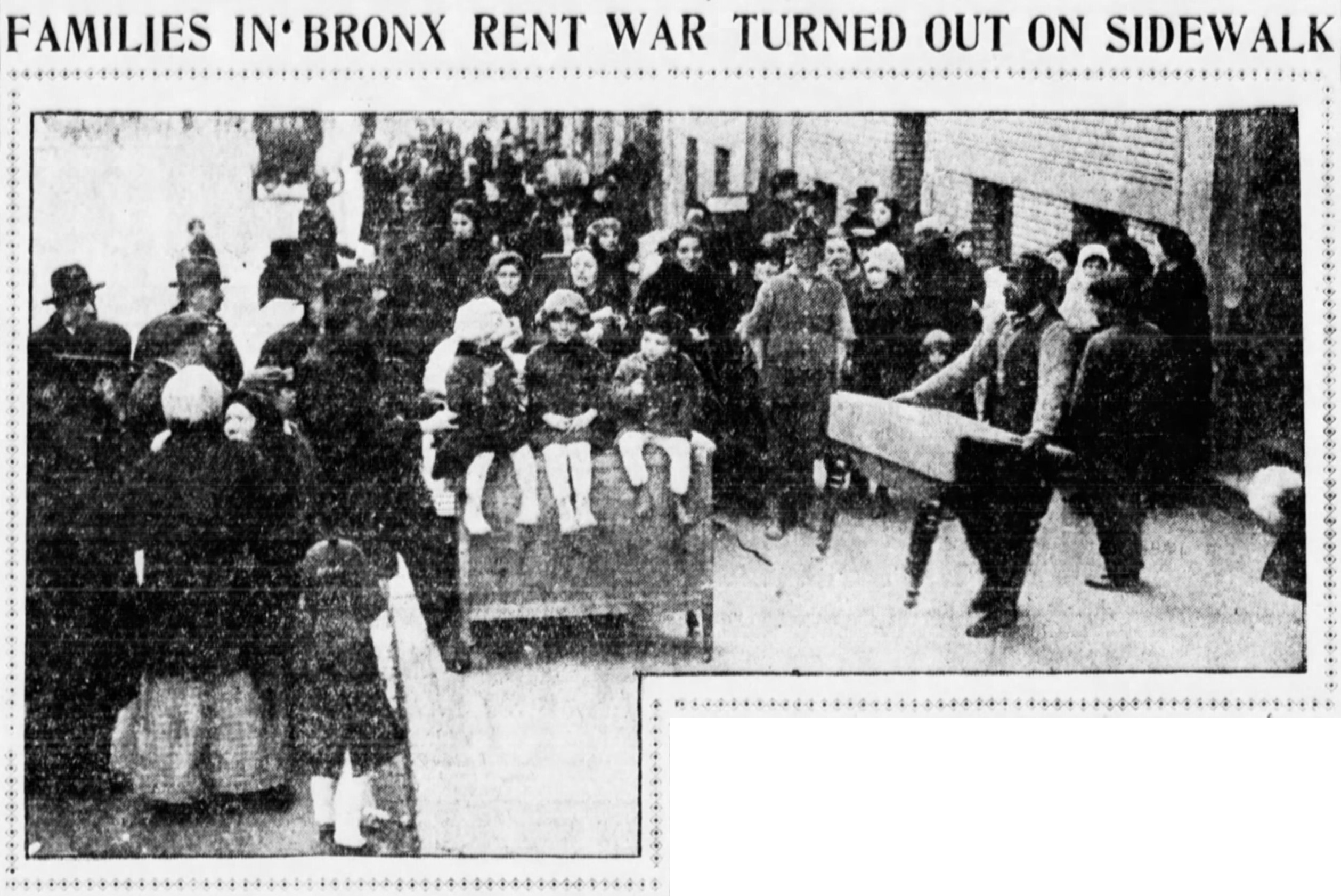
Three Bronx families being evicted on January 20, 1919

In January, Governor Al Smith established the Reconstruction Committee led by progressive Abram Isaac Elkus. The committee had a broad focus on many different social and economic issues, including housing. It argued against rent control and new tenant laws. Instead, the committee called for public housing and local housing boards, but first attempted to advocate for and use private philanthropy methods to alleviate the housing shortage. Ultimately, this did little to address the immediate housing crisis, but its proposals laid the foundation for the eventually establishing the New York Board of Housing in 1926 and New York public housing in the 1930s. (Note: Day 1999, p. 129–131.)

In March, the state legislature established the Joint Committee to Investigate Seditious Activities, known commonly as the Lusk Committee, to investigate suspected political radicals. Later from June 1919 to February 1920, the committee staged a series of raids within NYC and across New York, arresting thousands and seizing large amounts of radical political literature. (Note: Day 1999, p. 121–122.)

In April, the NY state Joint Legislative Committee on Housing (Lockwood Committee) was formed, and conducted lengthy hearings and investigations from April 1919 to March 1920. The committee eventually led a very limited number of prosecutions against sand and gravel dealers in 1920, which had little overall effect on racketeering or the supply and cost of housing in the city. It also proposed legislation to deal with the rent crisis that would eventually be used to promote the passage of the Emergency Rent Laws later in September 1920. (Note: Day 1999, p. 131–133.)

==== MCRP and landlord groups ====
In response to the crisis, The Mayor's Committee on Rent Profiteering (MCRP) was formed on April 14, 1919. The committee worked to settle rent disputes and assisted tenants. At the same time, it attempted to attack and destroy the Socialist-led tenant associations. (Note: copeland 2000, p. 29.) The MCRP was crucially designed based on, and as an alternative to, the comparable tenant union negotiating committees. The MCRP's policies focused primarily on limiting the tenant organizers' influence, rather than the landlords'. (Note: Day 1999, p. 112.) Both Mayor John F. Hylan and committee chairmen Nathan Hirsch (Note: Tax Commissioner, a former realtor, and member of the United Real Estate Owners Association (UREO) (Note: Day 1999, p. 111.)) viewed the committee's central role as defusing Socialist influence and popularity, not necessarily addressing the housing crisis.

In a letter indicative of this approach, Nathan Hirsch wrote to the Mayor Hylan, (Note: copeland 2000, p. 33.)

"The spirit of unrest, by many called 'Bolshevism,' is gaining very rapidly and will soon, if not checked, be a great and grave source of danger to the republic ... I have come to the conclusion that 'Bolshevism' is the result of a misunderstanding which, by proper education, mediation, publicity, and conciliation, could be overcome."

The MCRP's role of resolving disputes between tenants and landlords was ultimately moot, if not counterproductive, to tenants. The committee had no discretionary power to enforce any of its decisions. It could push a landlord to appear, in accordance with a committee summons, through threatening to raise the landlord's property taxes through a property reassessment of the raised rents. However, the committee had no methods at its disposal to use or attempt to force landlords to respect the committee's final decisions. Overall, several problems existed:

- Many cases never reached any decision
- There were very long wait times until a case would be heard
- Little to no protection from landlord retaliation existed for tenants who went to the committee
- Cases were typically drawn out into incredibly time-consuming investigations
- Of the decisions that were reached, it is unclear how many were respected, but violation of the decision was common. (Note: Day 1999, p. 116–117.)

Many of the different tenant union organizations ultimately labeled the MCRP as a "farce" after its ineffectiveness became clear. (Note: Day 1999, p. 117.)

The MCRP had the ability to put some public pressure on landlords through bad PR. However, the committee's rhetoric largely kept its focus on the case of bad individual landlords as the root of the crisis, rather than propose broader solutions to a structural problem. (Note: Day 1999, p. 114.) The MCRP, led by Hirsch, also began directly attacking tenant groups in late 1919, particularly focusing on Socialist tenant groups. The MCRP and the mayor began heavily publicized criminal proceedings against tenant organizers, accusing them of financial fraud. (Note: Day 1999, p. 113.) In September 1919, the MCRP brought criminal proceedings against the Socialist East Side Tenants League shortly after the league was formed. While in November 1919, three members of the Harlem's Tenants League were sentenced to workhouses for conspiracy. (Note: Day 1999, p. 113–114.)

That same month, the committee released a 100-page report on its activities. In the report, the United Real Estate Association claimed of the situation,

"There are probably 200,000 potential anarchists in the City only waiting a favorable opportunity to raise the flag of Soviet government, and their leaders are utilizing the rent and housing situation to accentuate the discontent that exists—witness the formation of rent leagues all over the City and the resultant rent strikes. It therefore behooves every landlord and every realty organization to 'go easy' on 'rent increases' during the coming winter. If they don't do this, there will not only be trouble in the City but the 1920 State Legislature will see bills introduced that will cause landlords to regret that they ever raised rents—no matter how little"

The United Real Estate Owners Association (UREO) was the most prominent real estate group within New York. It comprised a federation of different independent, local real estate groups. The landlord organization GNYTA had often lobbied together with UREO for the same issues beginning in 1910 and, following the start of the rent strikes, they began forging closer ties with each other, particularly regarding the issue of tenement ownership. (Note: Day 1999, p. 125–29.)

The last major group opposed to the tenants organizations was the Real Estate Board of New York (REBNY), a realtor and not landlord group. It often had large disagreements with the two other groups. REBNY, as a realtor group, was also significantly more powerful and influential within the legislature than either of the others. The group emphasized the professionalization of the industry, and thus supported licensing tenement leases and annual fees, and supported a bill to require licensing and regulation of real estate brokers, which UREO and GNYTA both vehemently opposed. Even among the UREO and GYNTA, infighting occurred. By the height of the housing crisis, with no end in sight, each group fractured in their approaches, both internally aned externally. (Note: Day 1999, p. 126–29.) GYNTA, which most directly represented the tenement landlords, was the least amendable to providing any concessions to tenants. While the UREO, led by Stewart Browne, in contrast, at one point called for some concessions and restraint by landlords for fear that, without it, landlords would lose entirely and be legislated,

"unless real estate do something that will protect their tenants as well as themselves the legislature will pass bills that will make owners look for years to come ... Any real estate owner who is not satisfied with 20 per cent net is going to get it in the neck. He will have the courts fixing rentals."

— Stewart Browne, UREO

That April, members of the GNYTL called a meeting of all striking tenants in the Bronx, and collected strike funds from members. The Workmen's Consumer League of Brownsville also started making plans for living in tents during the summer months to resist the rent increases. That month, the Brooklyn Tenants Union (BTU) formed with the support of Socialist assemblyman Charles Soloman. The BTU quickly demanded 10 percent rent reductions. After the building owners refused, the BTU called a rent strike against eight buildings owned by the president of the landlord association. On April 8, 1919, more than 350 tenants appeared in the Bronx Municipal Court to ask Justice Robitzek to take action to either prevent landlords from raising rent or to delay their evictions. Beyond extending the time when eviction notices became effective, the justice reportedly could do little for those who went before him. Robitzek stated, "This sort of rent raising is practically encouraging Bolshevism. They are doing their best to spread that disease." The strike lasted for 10 weeks, during which tenant leaders were beaten, houses picketed, potential tenants threatened, and one building fully evicted. By the end, tenants had won the rent reductions, however 72 of the 192 families were evicted before the end of the strike.

On May 5, the New York Times reported on the crowded New York Municipal courts, with 2,000 cases on the calendar. The MCRP represented many tenants in court, and many ended being dropped on technicalities or given grants of stay. The MCRP's program to use churches to house evicted tenants is described, with a total capacity of 9,000 to be expected from the participating churches in Manhattan and Brooklyn. Leo Gitlin, secretary of the Workingman's Consumer league of Brownsville, later said in response that people wouldn't use them and that it was foolish of the MCRP to spend so much time on it, as people who were evicted were simply 'doubling up' with friends or other families. It was also reported that 200 eviction proceedings, had begun against striking Brownsville tenants asking for a 10% rent decrease.

On May 10, The Brooklyn Daily Eagle reported that over 3,000 families were currently active in a Brownsville rent strike. According to Samuel Spivack, secretary of the BTU, around one hundred tenants had been evicted so far. During this time, moving men struck for higher wages, which thrilled the Brownsville tenants because it helped protect them from further eviction. The BTU issued a call for all "fraternal, religious and civic organizations" to attend a mass meeting at the Brownsville Labor Lyceum (Note: 219 Sackman Street, Brooklyn, NY) the night of May 20, stating the United Hebrew Trades also had sympathy for the strike and might offer material support. The legislative committee (the Lockwood Committee) had also been appointed by the senate and assembly to probe the rental situation in NYC, set to meet that day May 10, and were expected to confer with the MCRP. J.B. Allee, who the paper noted was speaking from a reality company's point of view, wrote both to the state governor and mayor's committee suggesting a cap on rent raises above 25% relative to May 1, 1914, prices as a means of stopping the rent panic. On May 15, The New York Times reported that instead around 1,500 Brownsville tenants were on strike. It claimed tenants had discussed the potential of a general Brownsville rent strike if their issues were not resolved by June 1, which would involve several thousand tenants. The tenants' main goal was to receive a year-long lease that would freeze rents for the year. Hirschfield of the MCRP told tenants that they had no power to stop landlords from raising rents but, in the event of increases, the city could increase tax assessments.

In June, while the Brooklyn Tenants League was on strike, a few strikers were arraigned in New Jersey Avenue court for "disorderly conduct", with $200 (equivalent to $3,714 in 2025) bail, they were jailed on an accusation that they had called people scabs. Judge Richards reportedly told them in court, "You're all a bunch of Bolsheviki, and I'll give you only one hour to pay up or get out." That same month, a session was called to both consider a women's suffrage amendment to the federal constitution and the housing crisis. On the MCRP's recommendations, a small series of laws was passed, which increased the required period of notice from 10 to 20 days and increased the maximum stay of eviction a judge could give to 20 days. (Note: lawson 1986a, p. 60–61.) While in August, the New York Times reported that 22 strikes were ongoing in the Bronx, most had 5 to 6 families, while one of the strikes included 68 families.

The union ties that many neighborhood associations had often proved useful during rent strikes. One such example occurred in September 1919, when a reality company attempted to evict 450 families through the use of a unionized moving company. The union moving men refused to move the belongings when the women on the tenant picket line, who were a part of the Williamsburg Tenants' League, showed their league membership cards. As a result, the landlord was unable to find a new moving company, which was further hindered by the high prices for the job, providing the tenants more time. Afterwards, the involved tenant strikers continued to picket and parade throughout the district. When the City Marshall attempted to use non-union movers the picketing tenants 'pitched in' or criticized them and, according to one paper, the movers were obliged to get out of the neighborhood as quick as possible.

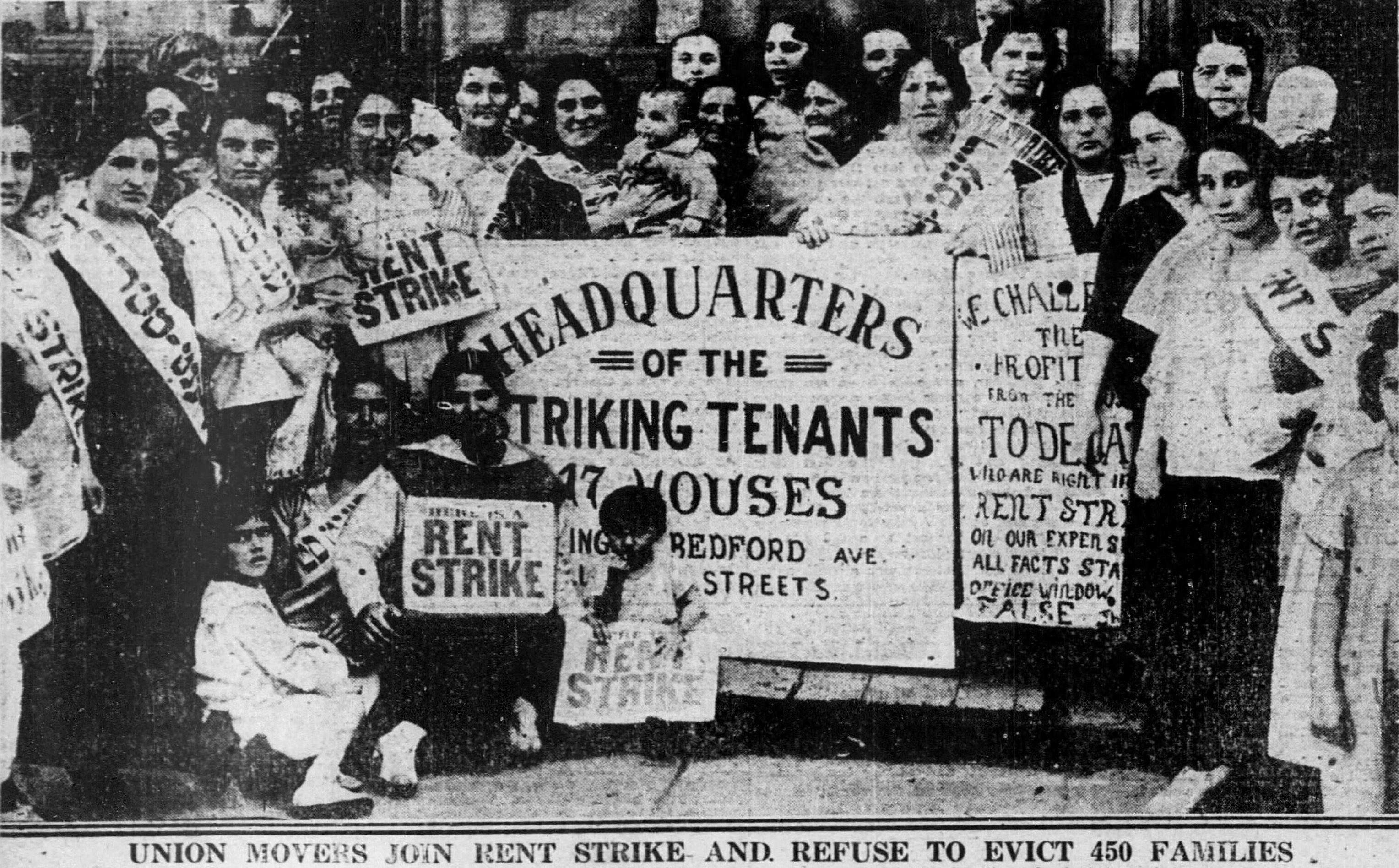
"Union Movers Join Rent Strike and Refuse to Evict 450 Families" - Pub. Sept 6, 1919

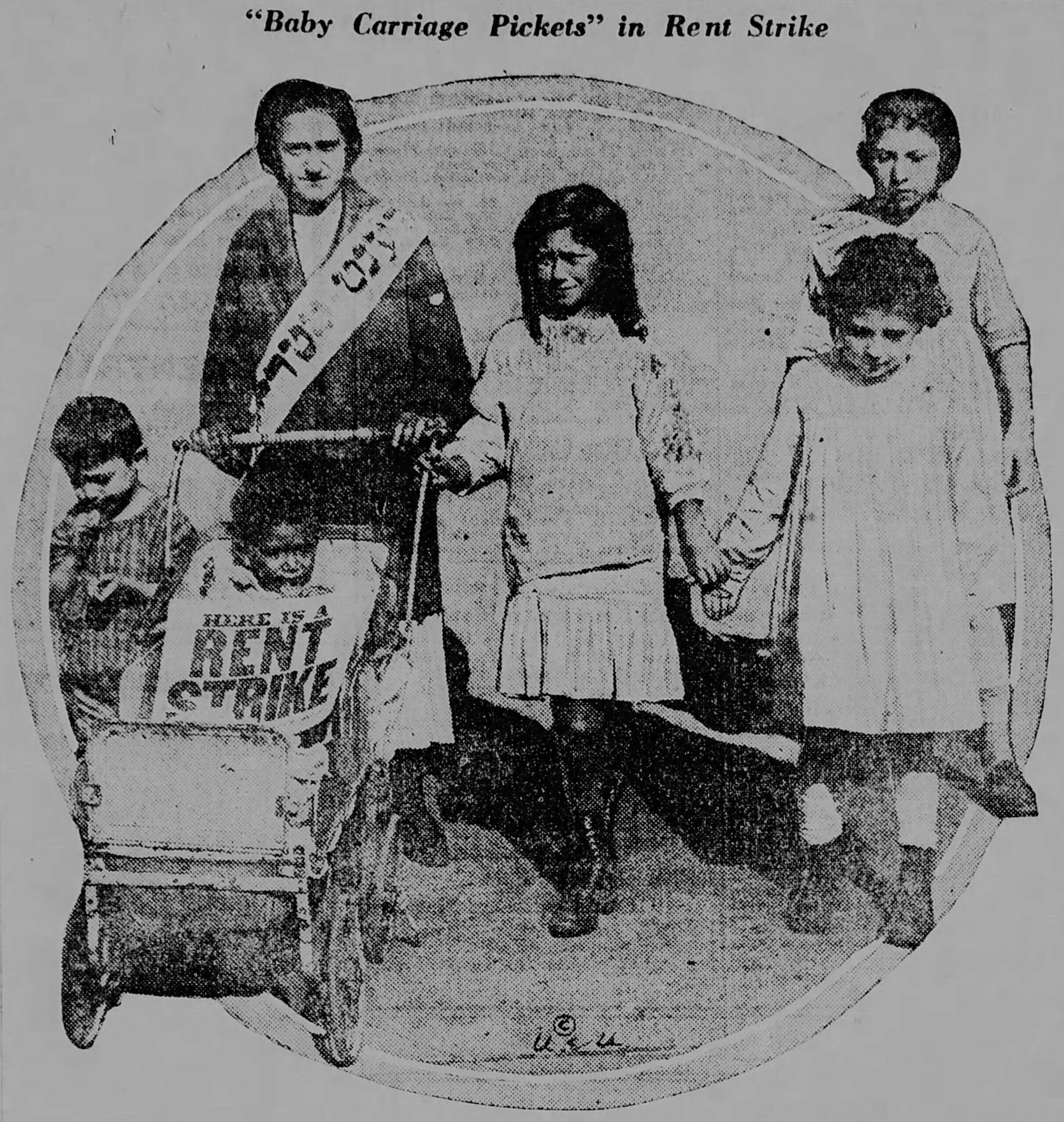
- Pub. Sept 6, 1919

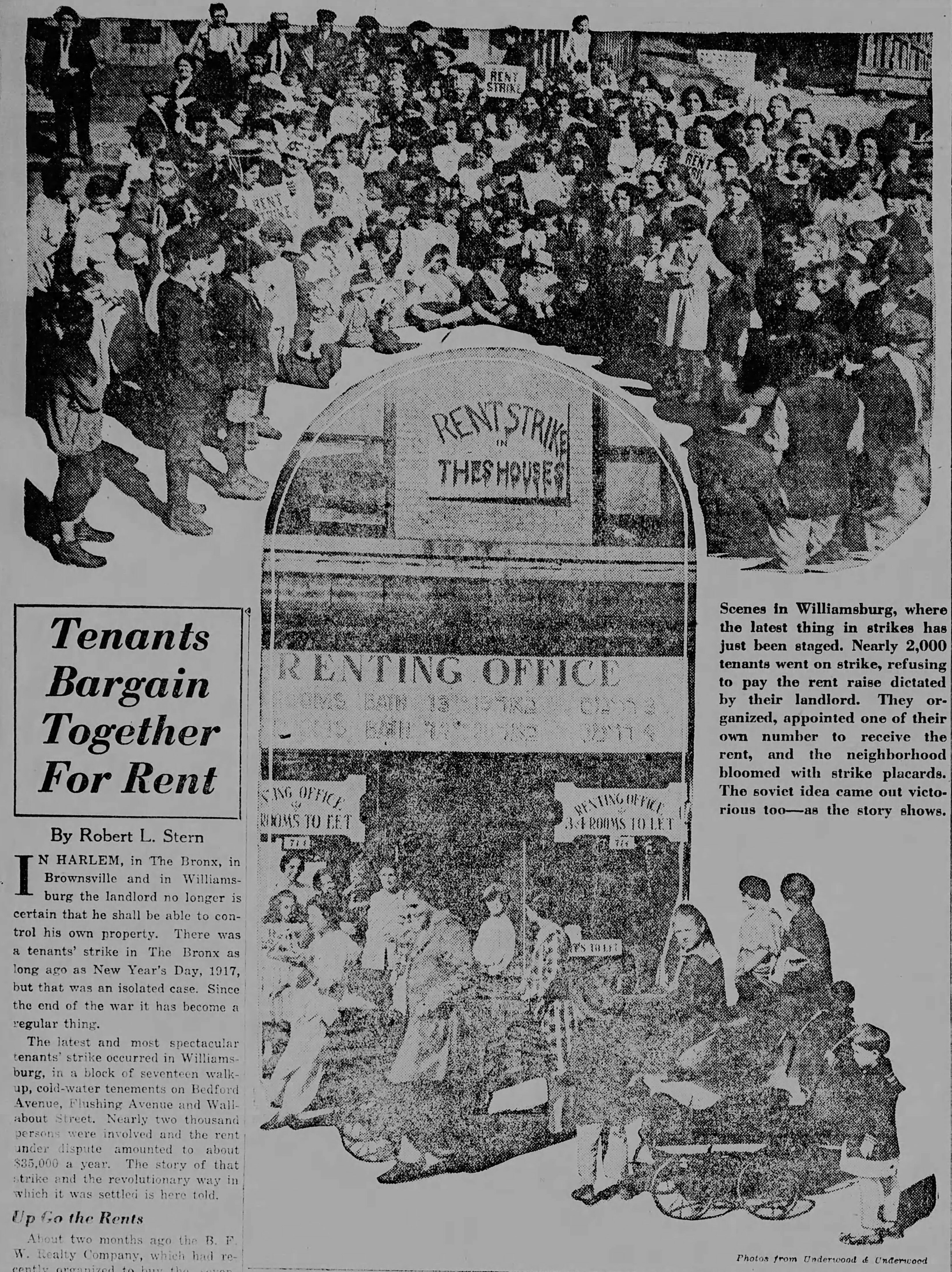
- Pub. Sep 14 1919

Williamsburg Rent Strike

The Williamsburg Tenants League began the strike on August 1. Ultimately, all the landlords' attempts to evict families failed despite them spending $6,000 (equivalent to $111,420 in 2025) in total and making four different efforts to find movers willing to help with the eviction. Tactics in this strike included hanging rent strike signs from their apartment windows, picketing, and in a few cases, the tenants committee repaying a prospective tenant's first month's rent advance, so that they would break the new lease and not move in. In the end, the tenants won a decrease in the amount of the proposed rent increase. The owner eventually offered to settle at one-third of the increase they had demanded. (Note: For all tenants who had moved in before May 1, those who had been in the building before the strike began.) In return for the tenants accepting the partial increase, they were promised a nine-month written lease and building improvements. (Note: lawson 1986a, p. 63.)

In September, the East Side Tenant League was formed. Socialist alderman Abraham Beckerman officially established the league at the party's headquarters. Within several weeks, there were 15 rent strikes and at least 1,000 members.

October 1, was described as one of the biggest moving days in NYC history at the time due to rent raises, with 75,000 families moving in Bronx and Manhattan. (Note: lawson 1986a, p. 64.) That month, Mayor Hylan instructed the Manhattan District Attorney to start a grand jury investigation into "certain east side organizations". (Note: lawson 1986a, p. 65, 91.) This included the newly formed East Side Tenants League. The investigation was on the request of Nathan Hirsch, who claimed,

"We have records of cases where in effect the tenants undertook to set up Soviet (Note: This meant something different historically, the Soviet Union did not exist formally yet in 1919 when this statement was made. Instead the term is likely referring to Soviets, also known as soviet workers councils. Which are a type of organizational structure, and operated as local semi-governmental organizations. They are largely associated with the Russian revolution and later the Soviet Union.) government, and we know of others where the actions of these leaders have been little less than anarchistic. Many of those who join these societies are foreign born, and they have no idea that their actions have been in direct violation of the law."

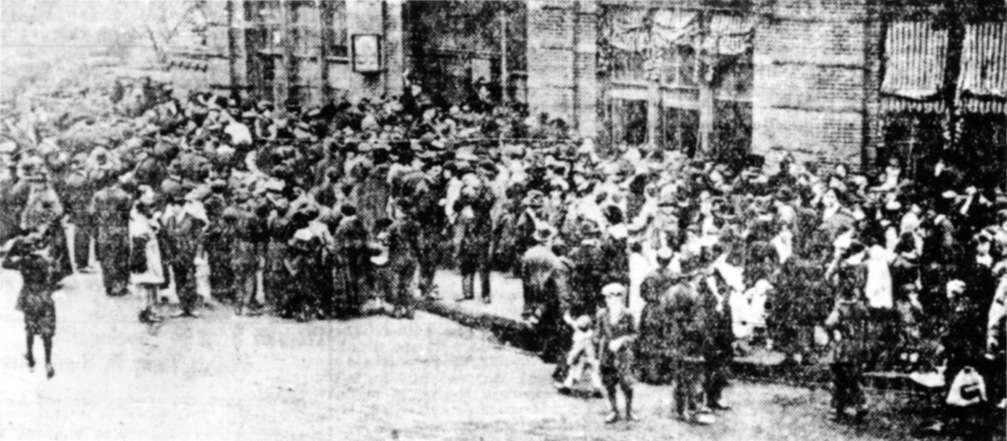
"The Overflow Crowd in the Street at Bronx Municipal Court" - Published October 7, 1919

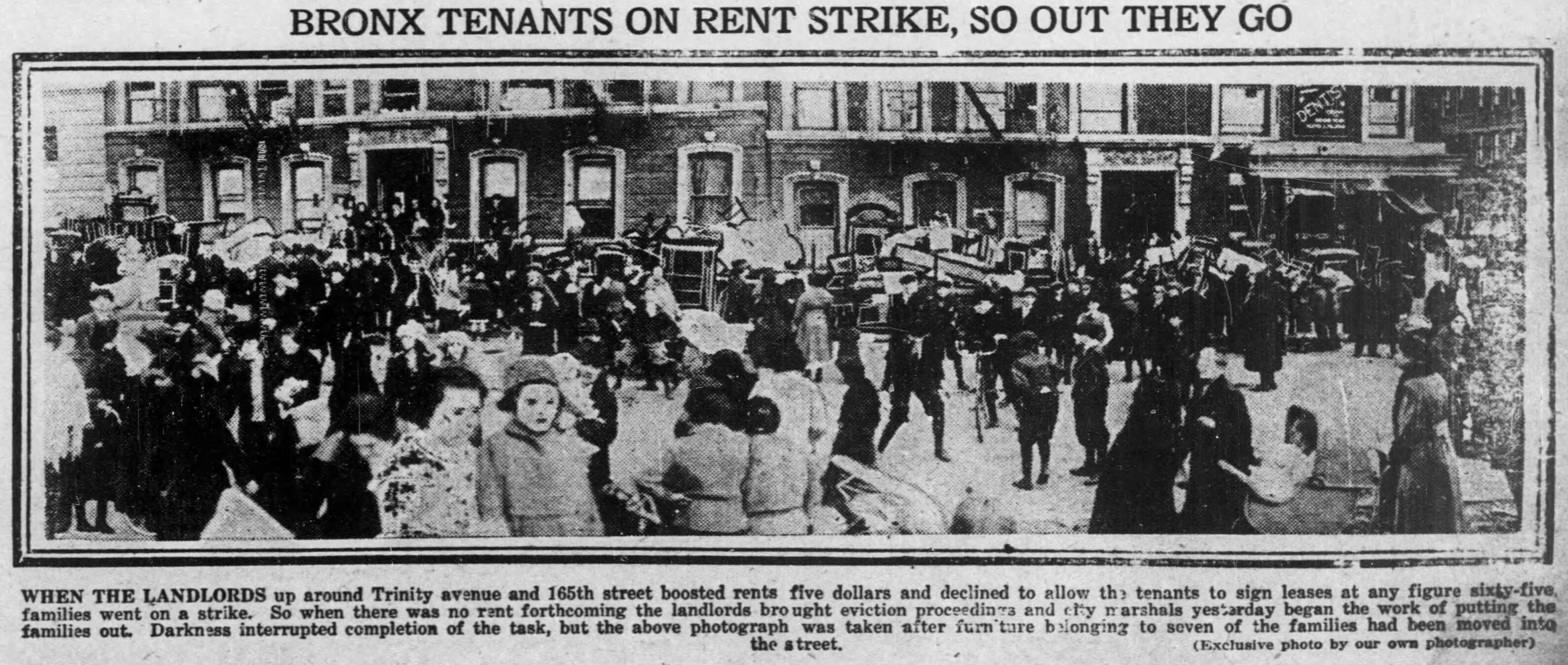
Striking Bronx tenants being evicted on October 20, 1919

On October 7, the assigned Manhattan District Attorney Anthony Swann followed this, announcing the start of a John Doe inquiry into people they claimed to be organizing "fake tenant associations" on the east side. The district attorney also accused the rent strikers of starting the strikes for private profit. While Nathan Hirsch claimed, "Evidence collected by the committee shows that some of these promoters were Bolsheviki. We want all those who have been deluded by these parasites to come to the committee for aid." Socialist Alderman and tenant leader of the East Side Tenant League Abraham Beckerman wrote a letter to Mayor Hylan in response to their comments, alongside Hirsch, and the investigation,

"Aside from the vituperation that one is accustomed to expect in any of your manifestos relating to labor or progress, they are several glaring misstatements. You refer to bands of men and women mulcting the tenants. Will you kindly state who comprise these bands of men and women and also name those tenants who have been mulucted? ... The working people of the city do not intend to be bulldozed and browbeaten by you in the manner in which you are intimidating civil service employes."

On October 28, Supreme Court Justice John M. Tierney ordered an investigation into the rent strikes in the Bronx. More than 30 members of various strike committees were examined on November 7.

In the lead up to the November 1919 elections, addressing the housing crisis became the central tenet of the Socialist party's electoral campaign. They attacked Republicans and Democrats for their failure to resolve the crisis, and promised to fight for a standard one-year lease, rent increase restrictions, and tenant rights around evictions. The election resulted in a partial victory for the Socialist Party. They won a greater share of the vote compared to the last election, with five Socialist New York assemblymen (Note: Samuel Orr, August Claessens, Samuel De Witt, Charles Solomon and Louis Waldman.) and four Socialist New York City aldermen elected. This is notable because many tenants, many of whom would likely have voted Socialist, had been evicted and thus were unable to vote, because they lacked a permanent residence. (Note: lawson 1986a, p. 65–66.)

In early November, 400 families in East New York went on rent strike, deciding not to pay a rent increase from $4 to $5. The 400 families lived in 184 apartments, and rent had already been increased by $2 in July, and by $2 and $3.50 on October 1 before the latest increase. In December, the Board of Aldermen passed an ordinance that Mayor Hylan was set to sign. The measure, which would go into effect January 1, would require for all Lessees to obtain licenses, with a yearly fee, in order to continue operating. A total of 96,623 families faced eviction proceedings in 1919.

=== 1920 ===
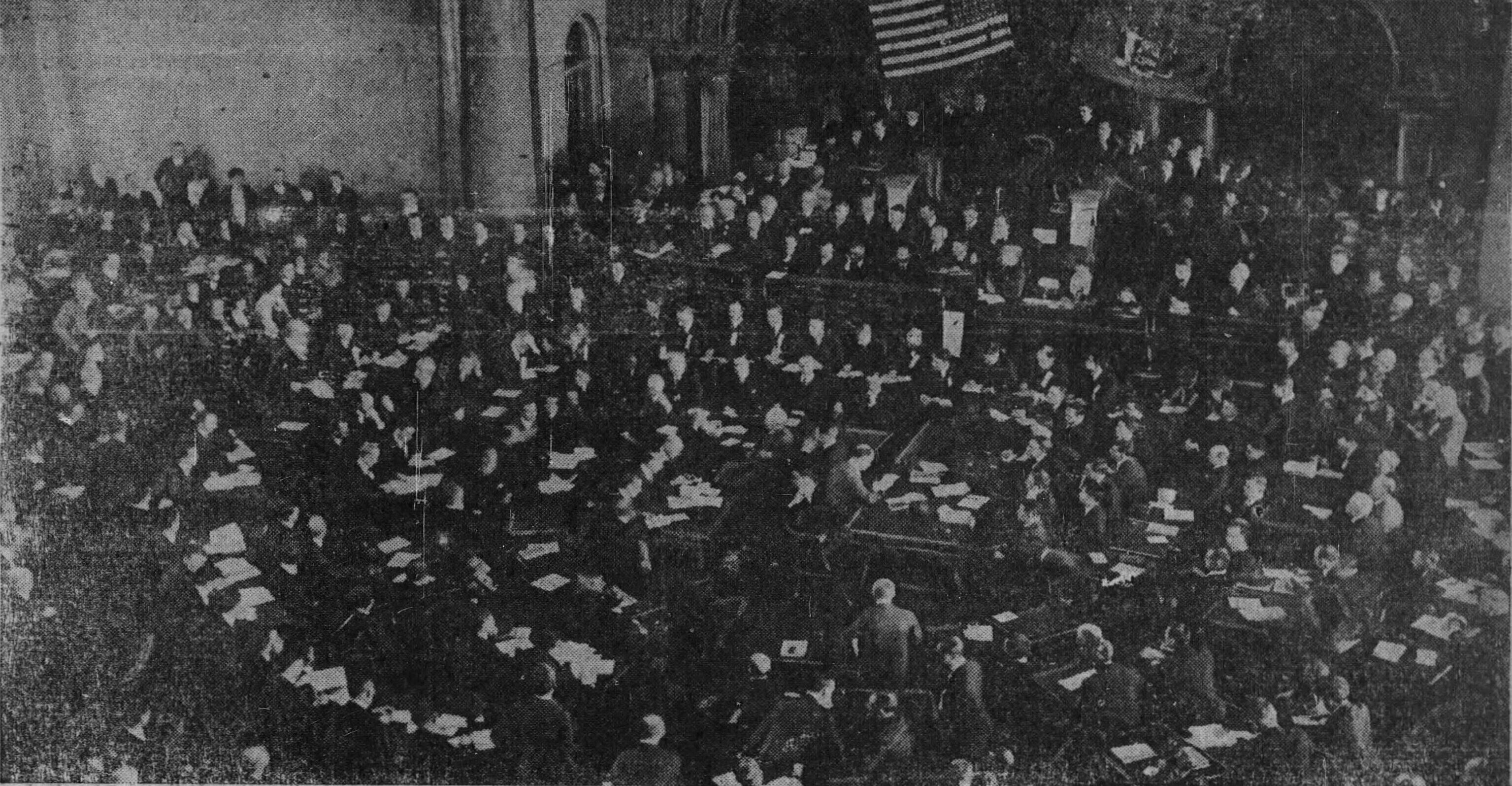
"Albany: Opening of Trial of the Socialist Party"
- Published January 21, 1920

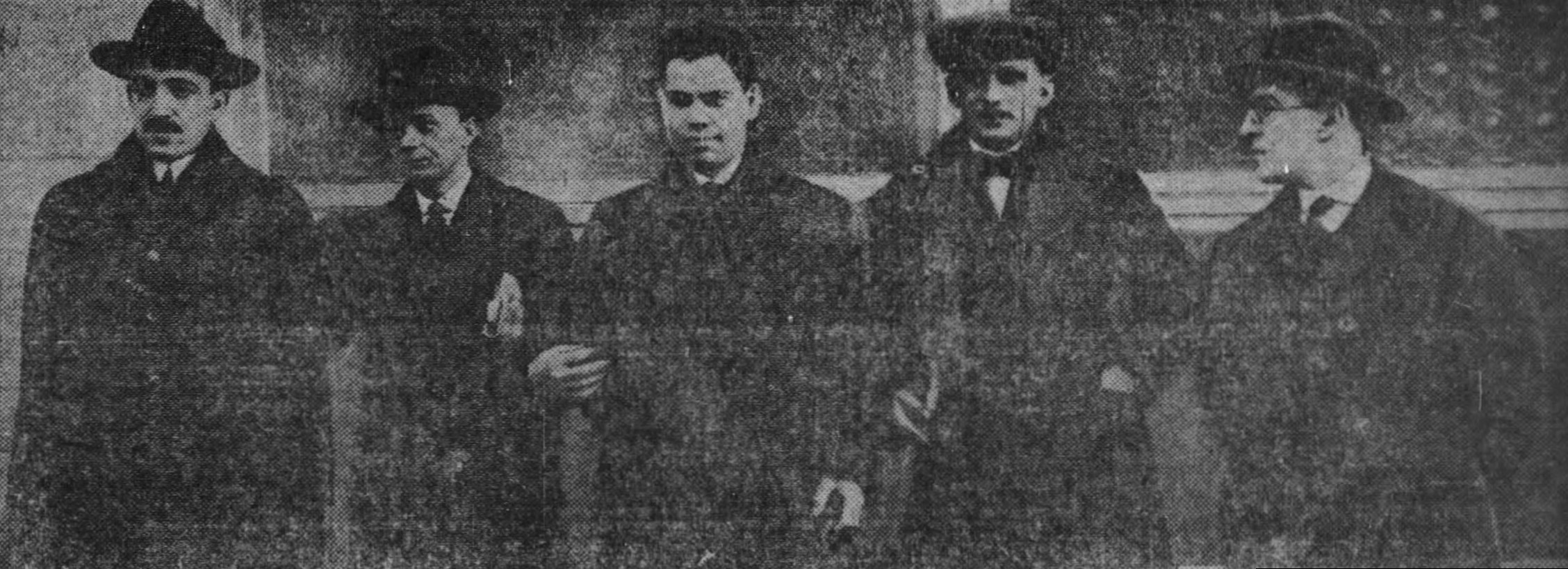
Five suspended Socialist NY assemblymen 1920, Left to right: Samuel Orr, August Claessens, Samuel De Witt, Charles Solomon and Louis Waldman.

When the New York State Assembly met on January 7, the five elected Socialist party members were sworn in. Shortly after, Speaker Thaddeus C. Sweet called the assembly members August Claessens, Samuel DeWitt, Samuel Orr, Charles Solomon and Louis Waldman of the Socialist Party to the front of the chamber. Sweet denounced them for being "inimical" to the best interests of the US and New York State. Then, by a vote of 140 to 6 they were suspended from the assembly by their colleagues. (Note: lawson 1986a, p. 52,65–66.) Afterwards, a prolonged fight of several months on whether to make the suspension permanent began. This culminated with the Socialist members being fully expelled on April 1, at 3 a.m., before the Assembly Committee on the Judiciary after a 14-hour trial, under the premise that they could not be "consistent and loyal" while being members of the Socialist Party. The five party members had been deeply involved with supporting the rent strikes.

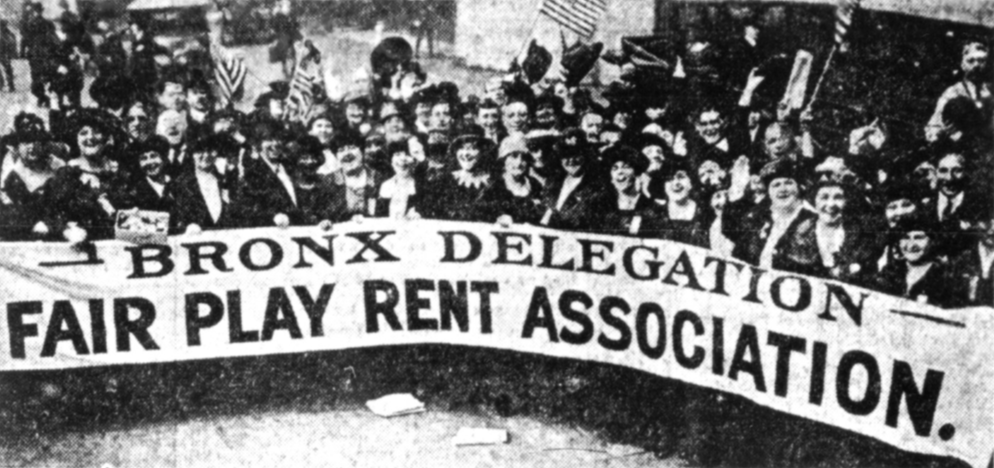
"Patriotic Bronx Citizens Ready to Fight for Their Homes. A Part of the Delegation at the Albany Hearing" - Published January 26, 1920

The Washington Heights Tenants Association and Fair Play Rent Association (FPRA) had separately formed early that year, and each were far more conservative than their striking counterparts. Their membership was open to landlords alongside tenants and they were considerably wealthier than the tenant leagues. They also, in contrast to other tenant organizations, had deep ties with the Democrat and Republican party organizations, opposed rent striking, and were deeply anti-Socialist. (Note: lawson 1986a, p. 68.)

In a speech indicative of these beliefs, a member of the conservative FPRA told the Lockwood Committee the following,

"I am an American woman ... You are going to pass laws. You are going to protect landlords. They have got rights under the constitution ... between the Bolshevism of the poor, helpless, ignorant, illiterate alien, that came here believing that this was the golden land ... [and] the Bolshevism of the people that will squeeze every last dollar out of their fellow men and women ... help the rest of us in the middle."

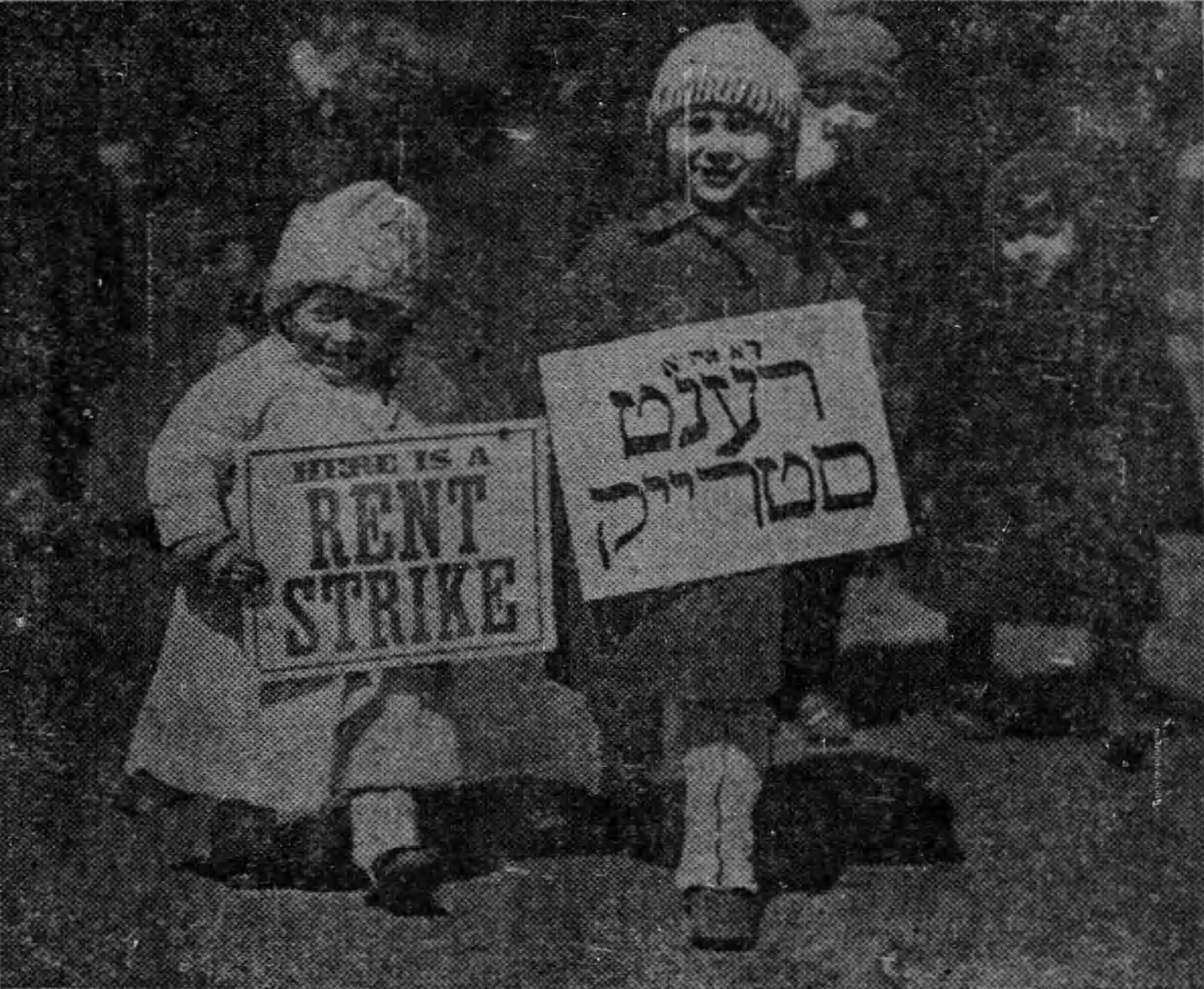
"Babies Picket in Rent Strike"-Pub. March 27, 1920

Facing a continued cost-of-living crisis, with the price of goods rapidly inflating during and following the war, the Central Federated Union (CFU) demanded that Mayor Hylan address the rent increases with legislation. Facing threats that the CFU would take action if its demands went unaddressed, the city administration endorsed the CFU's proposal that municipal judges be given discretionary power on the reasonableness of rent increases in court.

In March, NYC's District Attorney staged a string of raids against the Tenants League, seizing records in the process and weakening their organizing in the short term.

On March 30, the United Hebrew Trades (UHT) held a mass meeting to push for legislature to alleviate the rent crisis. (Note: Day 1999, p. 132.) The meeting consisted of 640 delegates from several hundred organizations, including Jewish labor and tenant unions, consumer societies, Socialist party locals, synagogues, and fraternal orders. Together they formed the United Tenants Organization. (Note: lawson 1986a, p. 71–72.)

The meeting had representatives from the 350,000-member Central Federated Union and Brooklyn Central Labor Union with 100,000 members, while the UHT represented 350,000 members. The main reason the UHT entered the conflict was a fear of increasing antisemitism. The UTO took a moderate position on solving the rent crisis, in hopes to defuse the issue. However, this was instead reported on in alarmist terms by members of the MCRP and in the newspapers that took primarily pro-landlord positions, with claims that the UTO was organizing a general strike.

That month Leo Gitlin of the Brownsville Tenant League claimed that organizing for a general rent strike on May 1 had begun. This was widely reported on but did not have the actual organizing behind it, and eventually Gitlin was denounced by other tenant leaders in April, before the set May Day and Moving Day date. (Note: lawson 1986a, p. 68–69.) During this time, Arthur Hilly, the then-chairman of the MCRP, warned of a "Red Revolution" and U.S Attorney General Palmer staged many arrests and raids of tenant leaders. Repression of tenants significantly increased following the passage of the April Rent Laws. (Note: Day 1999, p. 137–138.)

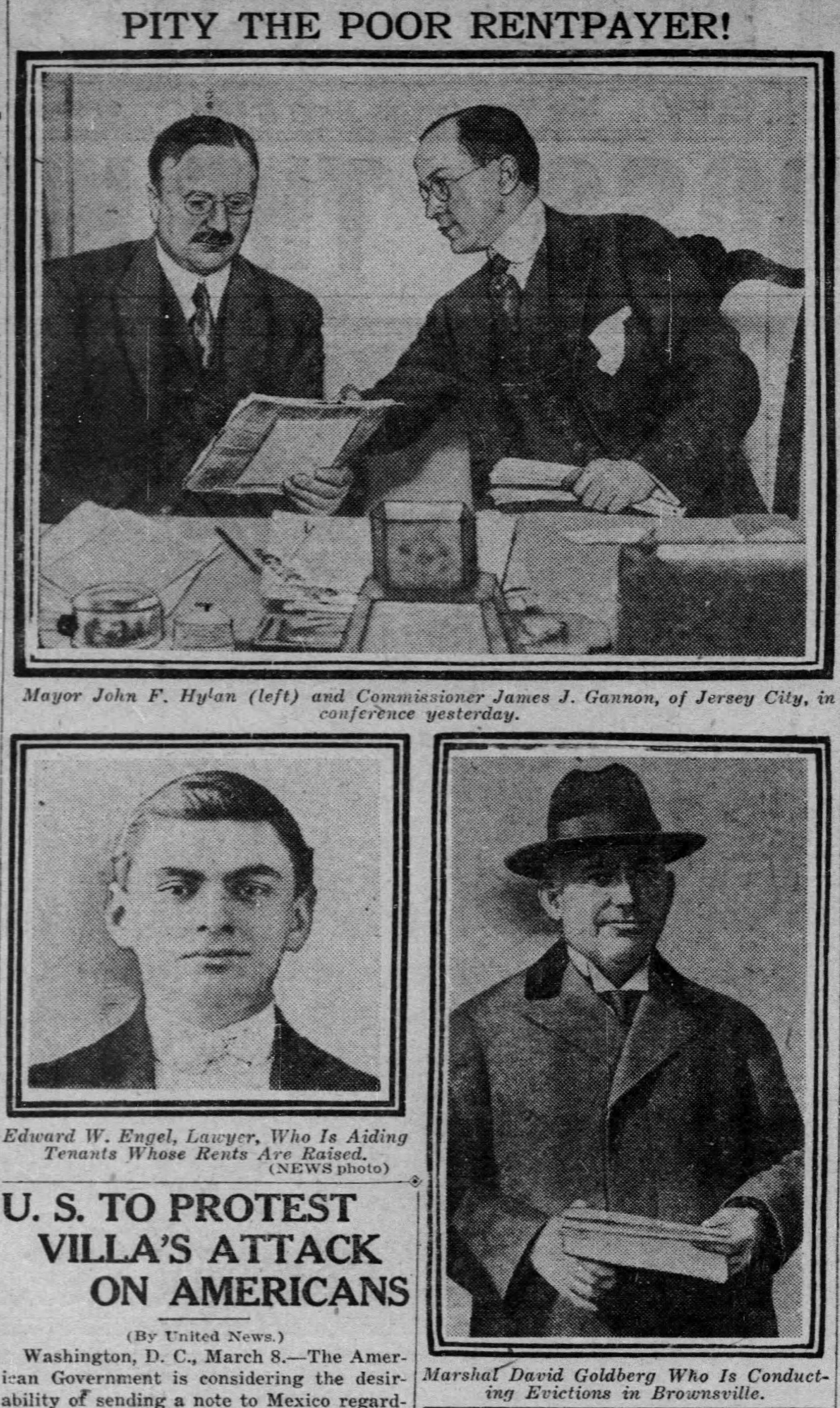

By March 14, around 8,500 people had gone on rent strike in the months of February and March 1919 in New Jersey. (Note: 5,000 in February, 3,500 in March) The article further described support of the rent strikes by James F. Gannon, director of the Department of Revenue and Finances who, in the event of rent increases above a ten percent return, and if complaints were filed by tenants to the department, would send two letters: one to the tenants calling for them to pay the old rent, but not the rent increases and, one to landlords to resolve the issue in city hall. Reportedly, the threat of violations being filed by New Jersey departments was used. As Gannon stated in the news article,

"In the case of a refusal I call into action the other parts of the city government which are working in close cooperation with my bureau and we make it pretty hot for the landlord, I can tell you."

==== Immediate aftermath ====
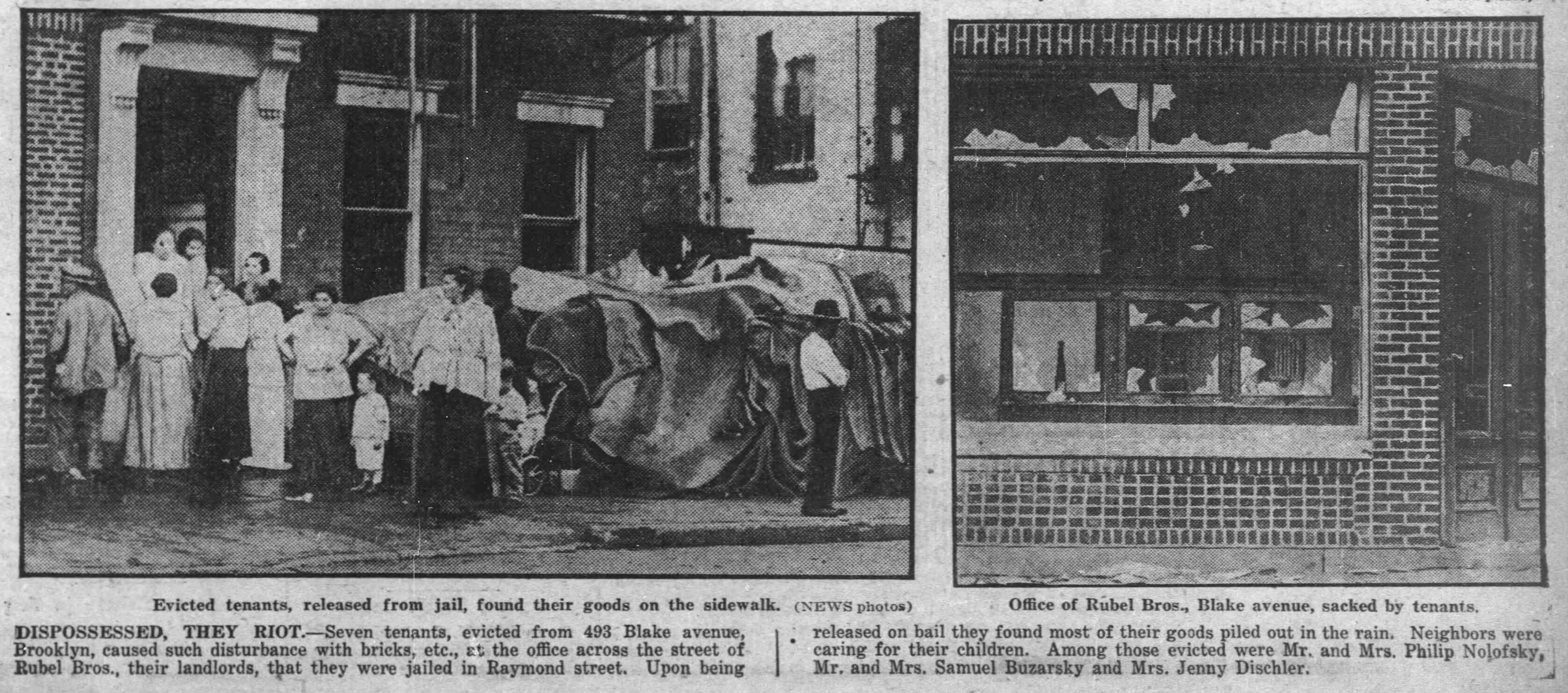
"Dispossessed, They Riot," -Pub. August 19, 1920

April 1920 marked the beginning of the end of the rent strike wave. The passage of the April Laws led to a slowing of strikes. Strike organizing returned as it became clear the laws were inadequate. However, the passage of the Emergency Rent Laws in September marked the end to the wave.

On April 1, the Socialist party members were expelled from the NY assembly, after which much of their efforts became dedicated to reelection. (Note: lawson 1986a, p. 74.) The same day, the April Rent Laws were signed after being passed the day before by the NY Legislature. These laws overturned the Ottinger laws, which were heavily criticized for worsening the housing crisis by removing tenant protections, gave courts the ability to grant stays of eviction up to one year if no other leases at the same cost are available, removed no-cause evictions, and lastly gave tenants the ability to challenge rent increases in court, with the burden of proof falling on the landlord for rent increases above 25% and the burden on the tenant for rent increases below 25%. The laws were ultimately criticized for not adequately addressing the crisis, eventually leading to the passage of the Emergency Rent Laws in October. (Note: lawson 1986a, p. 72–73.)

On April 28, it was reported that agents at the Department of Justice were cooperating with the MCRP "to take care of any disorders that may grow out of the threatened rent strikes" in the Bronx. Leo Kenneth Mayer, counsel for the committee, was also to ask federal authorities to "curb profiteering by moving van men". Authorities were concerned about the mass May 1 rent strike date, claiming backing by radical agitators. Arthur J. Hilly of the mayor's committee claimed a Socialist politician and woman agitator were the leaders behind the agitation, whose names they gave to special agent Charles F. Scully but would not reveal to the public. It was stated that they would be arrested federal authorities found them. The Department of Justice and police department stated they believed a general rent strike was a genuine threat, however District Attorney Martin's investigator stated they failed to find any evidence of plans for it. On May 1, the strike date came and went without any mass rent strike.

All five Socialist assemblymen were re-elected in special elections held on September 16 to replace their vacancies. They then appeared to take their seats at the special session on September 20. The next day, however, Claessens, Solomon, and Waldman were expelled once again in a vote of 90 to 45. DeWitt and Orr were seated, but resigned in protest against the re-expulsion of their colleagues.

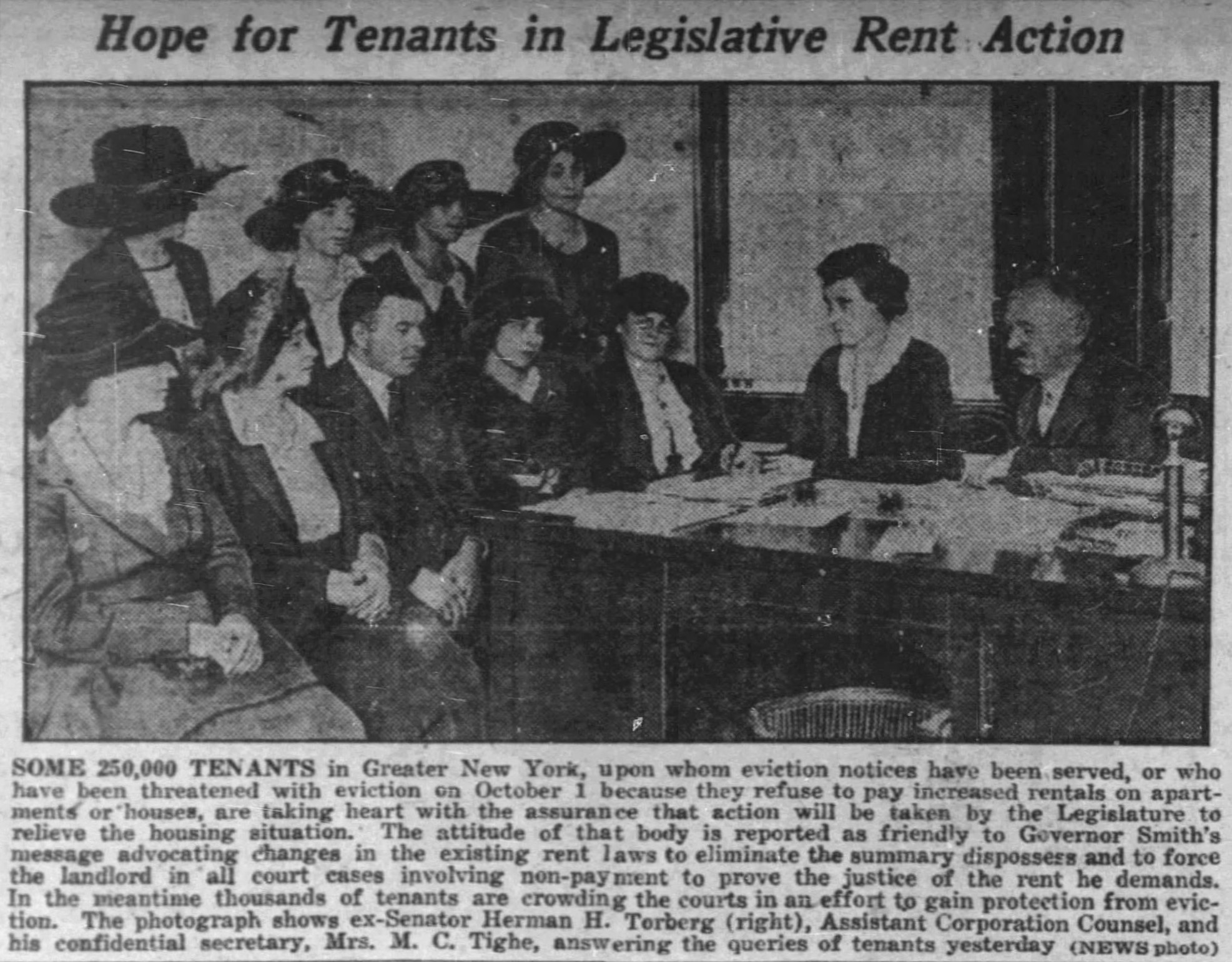

In September, it was reported that 100,000 tenant-landlord court cases were awaiting trial in the municipal court, from tenants in anticipation of their October 1 lease expiration dates reestablished with the April Laws. Many tenants had decided to fight against rent raises in the court, rather than accept the increases on October 1 or search for a new home with likely equally high rates. In the meantime, they would be granted a stay of eviction at current rates while the issue was fought in court. The paper reports the judges' stress faced with the sheer number of cases, which had caused a reduction in their rest and lunch periods. Even with the reduced breaks, it was expected that seeing all the cases would take almost a full year.

In October, the New York Legislature passed the Emergency Rent Laws, which were signed into law. Alongside the April Laws, they were the first rent control laws in the nation's history. They removed the 25% clause of rent increases of the April laws. So, instead of the burden of proof falling on the tenant for any rent increase below 25%, the landlord would always have to prove a justification for a rent increase. It made it so that for a rent increase by any amount, landlords had to submit an invoice of expenses to the court, and the judge had to determine if the rent increase was reasonable. Eventually, judge settled on a standard 8% total profit on the market value of the property as a reasonable return to expedite the court process. The law, was limited in practice, but still meaningfully curbed rent increases. (Note: copeland 2000, p. 37–40.) The law also permanently restricted the ability for a landlord to deny lease renewals to current tenants, thus relieving the potential eviction crisis on October 1. (Note: copeland 2000, p. 39–40.)

Although the rent control section of the law was originally set to expire in 1922, it was instead renewed several times. The later renewals would eventually attach conditions that weakened its scope and power. Then, in 1928, the law was not renewed and allowed to fully expire in 1929. (Note: lawson 1986a, p. 84–85.)

===== Last major rent strike =====
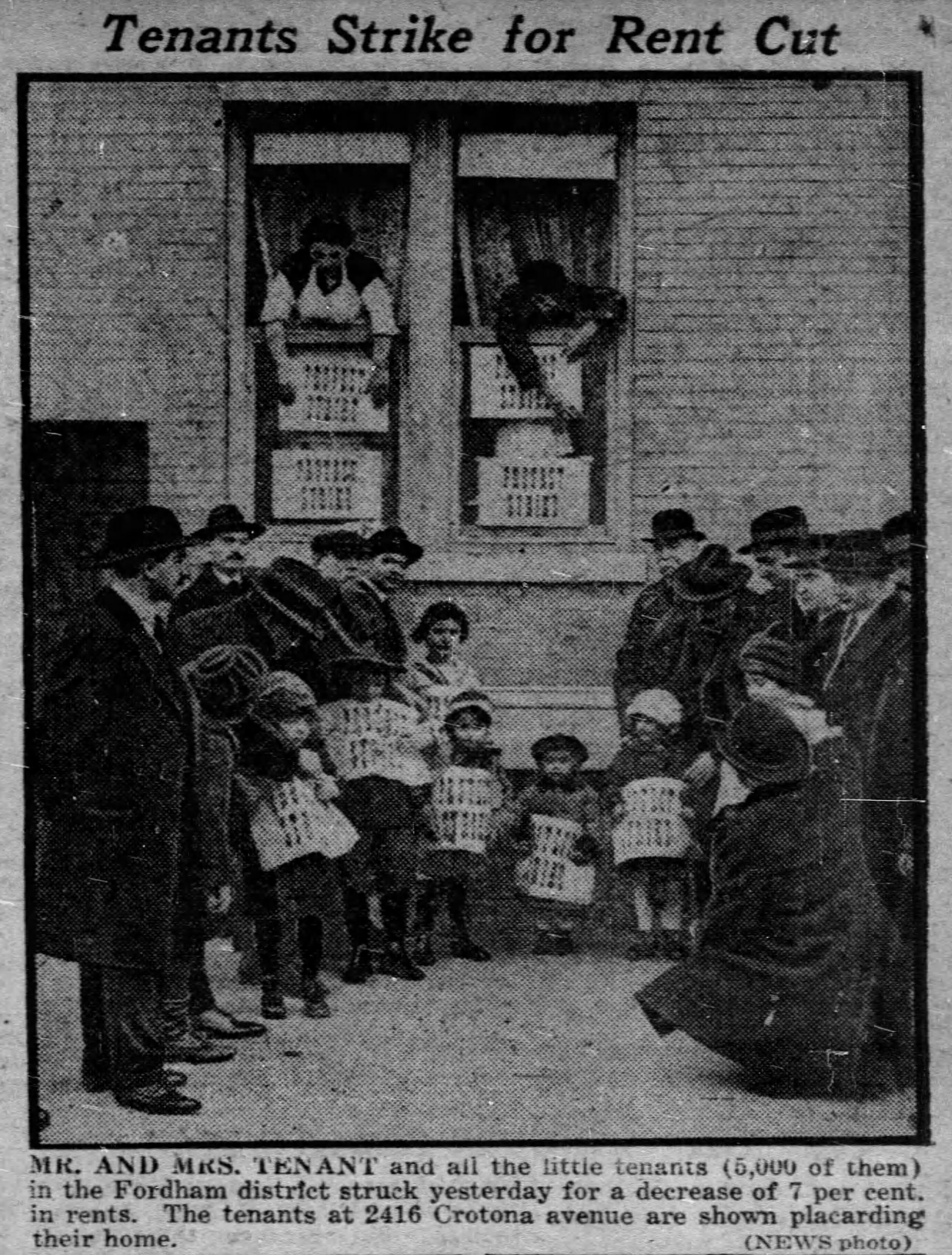

The rent laws had a chilling effect on rent strikes in New York City with because they resolved the issue of exorbitant rent increases. The last reported major on rent strike of this period would occur on December 1, 1920. When 4,500 tenants of East Fordham, Bronx (Note: Area affected is bounded by East 183d street, Fordham Road, Third Avenue and Southern Boulevard.) went on rent strike. Tenants were calling for a 7% rent decrease, as the tenants had faced an average 20% reduction in their wages. The majority were garment workers, which at the time was facing a post-WWI downturn, with some only working half time and others who had to face substantial wage cuts. (Note: lawson 1986a, p. 75.) The strike was the result of a months-long campaign by the Bronx Tenants League. With thousands of signs with "protest" and "strike" appearing in the windows of hundreds of apartment houses in the neighborhood on December 2. They also demanded a proper supply of hot water and heat, which were called for by the terms of the lease.

== Aftermath ==
=== Legislative ===
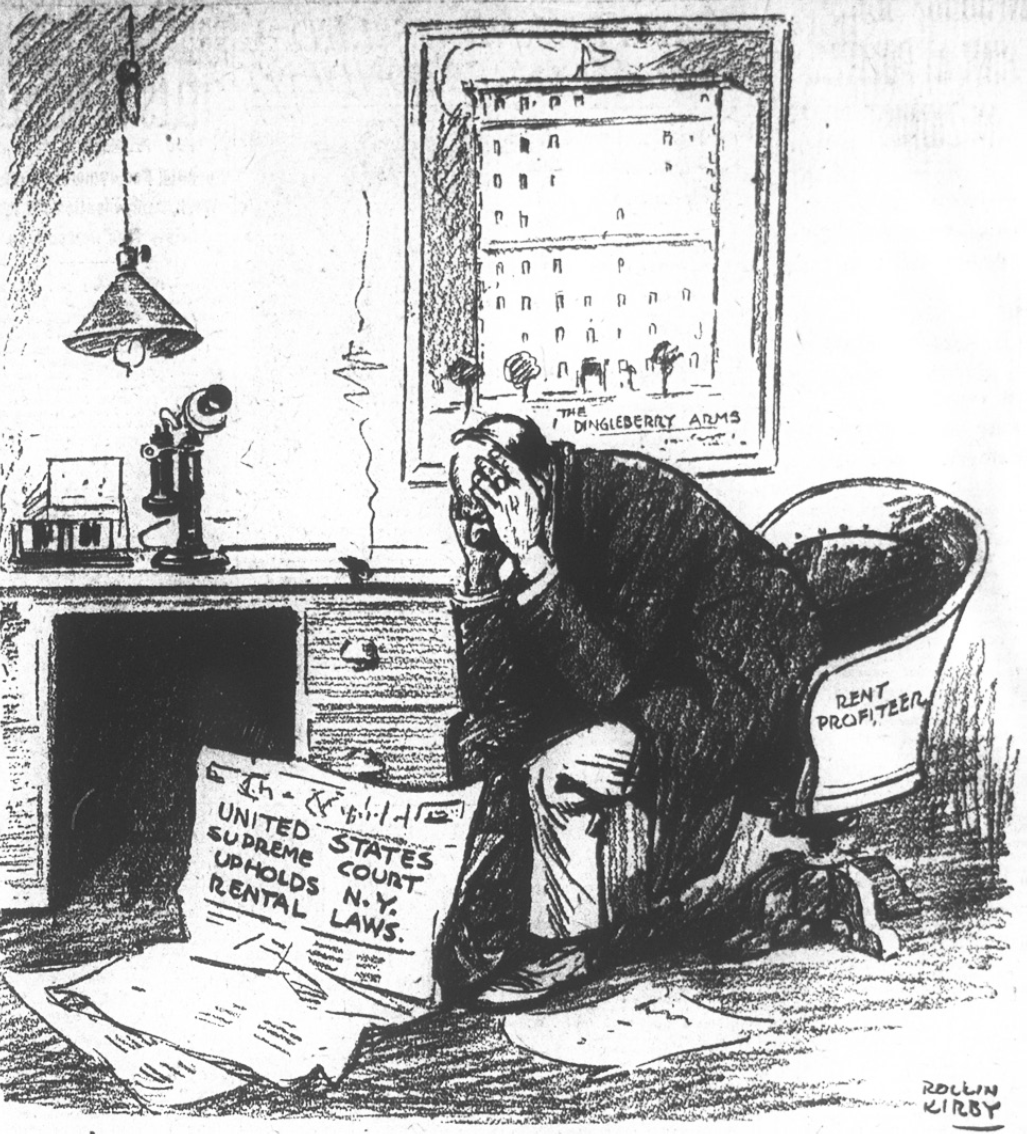
Out of Luck, New York World -April 20, 1921

The series of rent strikes from 1918 to 1920 within New York City led to the passage and implementation of certain tenant protections and the first rent control laws in the nation.

Landlord organizations made massive efforts to both subvert, undermine, and overturn the new laws. Some early examples include trying to classify tenements as "hotels", falsifying tenant receipts, and falsifying lists of expenses, while later efforts largely focused on judicial efforts. (Note: Day 1999, p. 145–148.)

In addition, the rent crisis and subsequent governmental response caused a fundamental shift in tenant-landlord relations and started a long process towards transitioning to written leases, rather than oral lease law within New York City. The cumulative effects of all the legislative changes, shifts in public opinion, and political legitimacy of tenant rights were significant. (Note: Day 1999, p. 133–135.)

==== April Laws ====
On March 31, 1920, the New York state legislature overwhelmingly passed a series of tenant protections. The next day, on April 1, the governor of New York signed them into law. These soon became known as the April Rent Laws. Several major protections were implemented with its passage:

One provision gave municipal courts the legal power to grant stays of eviction up to one year if a judge was convinced the tenant was unable to final similar housing at a rent they had been paying. The ability for landlords to do no-cause eviction was also removed by a separate legal chapter of the law; previously, a landlord could implement a summary eviction on the basis that the tenant was "objectionable" without needing to provide proof. Now, the landlord would have to provide evidence to a court.

Another law gave tenants the ability to take a landlord to court over unjust rent increases. For any increases lower than 25%, tenants bore the burden of proof, while for increases above 25%, the landlords did. The 25% threshold was heavily criticized for being too high, (Note: copeland 2000, pp. 26–27.) but this protection only covered increases for current tenants before the laws passage, and it did not apply to new tenants. (Note: lawson 1986a, p. 73.) Chapter 130 repealed the 1918 Ottinger Law, which had been widely blamed for exacerbating the housing crisis. (Note: copeland 2000, p. 37.) Chapter 133 made it so now a landlord had to provide evidence that a tenant was "objectionable" before carrying out a summary eviction. Previously landlords could evict "objectionable" tenants without evidence.

Before long, the April Laws were soon criticized for their failings. In effect, the law created three types of tenant: those with written leases with set expiration dates, month-to-month tenants without written leases, and written leases of unspecified duration. The first category remained fully protected from increases until their lease expired and had to be allowed to renew their lease. The second group was largely not protected from rent increases below 25%, and it was largely impossible to win a case because the burden of proof was on the tenant. However, they were partially protected from eviction because, if they lost a case, most were given a stay of eviction from one month to a year. The last category, while protected from rent increases, were in the most precarious situation. These tenants with signed leases without a set duration could have their lease terminated on October 1 without qualification.

New York City faced the potential of 60,000 evictions at once in 1920 from the Chapter 130, October 1 lease date which applied to that last group of tenants. This had the potential to further inflame the rent and housing crisis.

==== Emergency Rent Laws ====
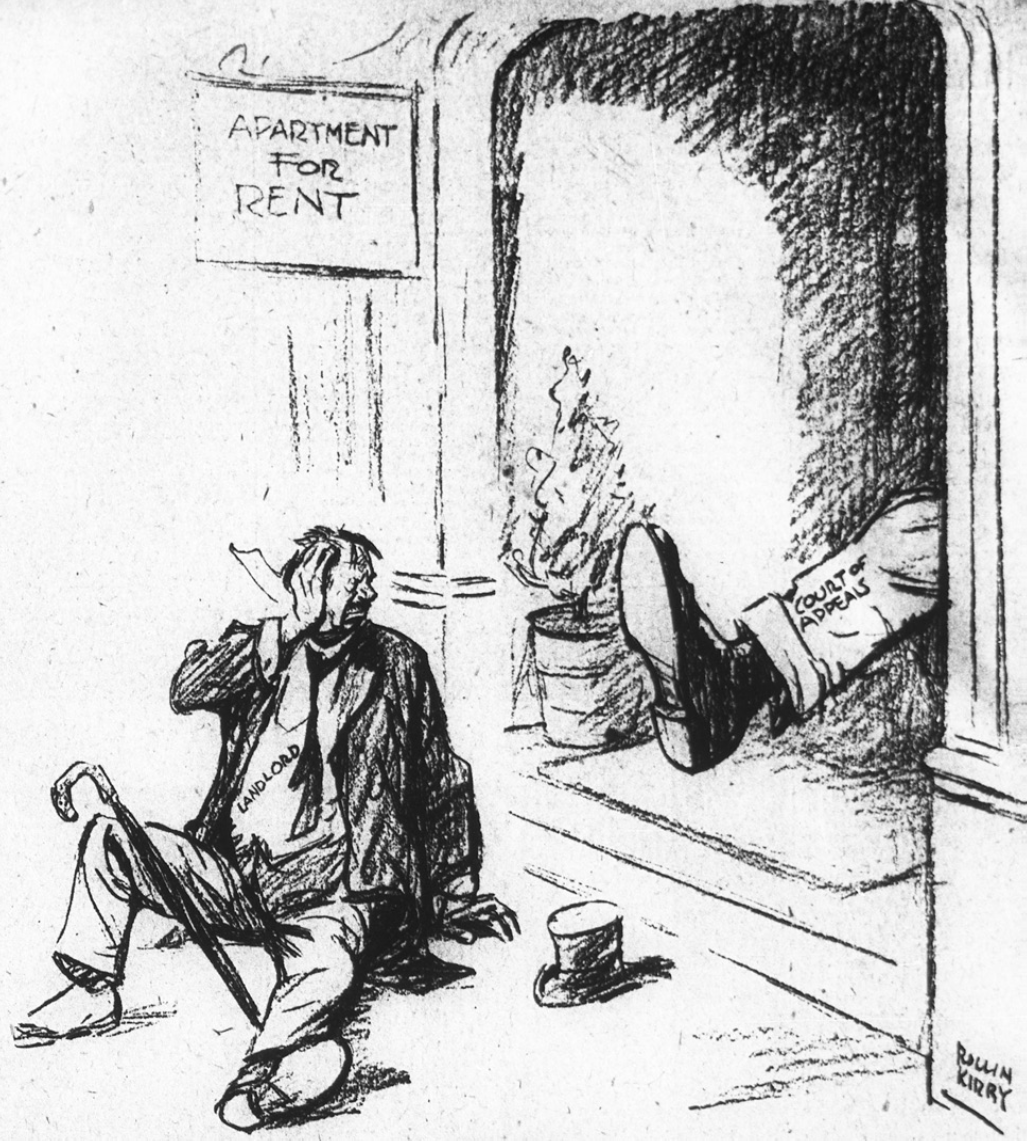
Comic depicting landlord being 'evicted' by court of appeals, March 10, 1921

As it became clear that the new tenant protections were still inadequate, pressure from tenant organizations and some of the judges, who were overwhelmed by the continued high numbers of eviction cases and challenges, led to the passage and signing of the Emergency Rent Laws in October 1920, which, alongside the April laws, were the first rent control laws in the nation. The laws applied to a select group of cities in the state of New York and certain multifamily dwellings. (Note: Day 1999, p. 136.)

The Emergency Rent Laws restricted a landlord's ability to deny lease renewals to current tenants, thus relieving the potential eviction crisis on October 1. The laws also modified the April Law around rent raises, eliminating the 25% clause that had put the burden of proof on the tenant. Instead, for any rent increase, a landlord would be required to submit an invoice of expenses when requesting it, with the burden proof on them instead of the tenant.

This section applied only to current tenants, so if a new tenant were to move into a new building after the law's signing, the landlord could charge them much higher rents then the law would otherwise allow. (Note: copeland 2000, p. 38.)

No administrative body was set to oversee the implementation of these laws; instead, judgement was left to municipal courts. This likely prevented landlords from re-establishing control of or watering down the power of the rent laws. Something which, one academic paper notes, is a testament to the power exercised by tenants and the worry lawmakers had of unrest if relief was not provided.

Soon after judges settled on an 8% total profit on the market value of the property as a reasonable return. Landlords attempted to circumvent this cap on rent through "paper exchanges" of buildings to artificially inflate property market values. However, in spite of this, the new law still meaningfully limited rents in relation to previous raises before. (Note: copeland 2000, p. 40.) Due to the high case load, judge rulings soon made it so landlords were only allowed to bring suit in their court district where the buildings in question were located to prevent them from forcing tenants to travel long distance to appear in court. (Note: lawson 1986a, p. 76.)

The rent control laws were originally set to expire in November 1922. However they were renewed in 1922 through 1923. Then, in late 1923, the laws were extended to February 15, 1926, and expanded to have rent control also apply to tenancies entered into after 1920. Tenant advocates and the governor held extensive hearings on the rent crisis leading up to the extension, as they feared that courts might strike it down. (Note: lawson 1986a, p. 80.)

By 1925, the chance of an extension was much slimmer. Tenant groups fought aggressively in electoral lobbying efforts for the renewal of the law, which at this point were separate, larger, but more moderate groups then the ones established during the rent strikes. The laws were extended in February 1926 to June 1, 1927, but were weakened. All apartments renting at more than $20 per room per month were now exempted from rent control. (Note: lawson 1986a, p. 82.) By 1927, tenant associations had lost most of their previous strength and numbers. A compromise was established and in March 1927 and the laws were extended again to June 1, 1928, but further limited to apply only to apartments renting at less than $15 per room per month.

One last extension to the rent law was made in March 1928. Rent control for apartments renting at $15 per room per month would extend to December 1, 1928, while rooms less than $10 a month would have rent control until June 15, 1929. after which, New York City was without rent control for the first time in almost 10 years. (Note: lawson 1986a, p. 85–86.)

=== Leases ===
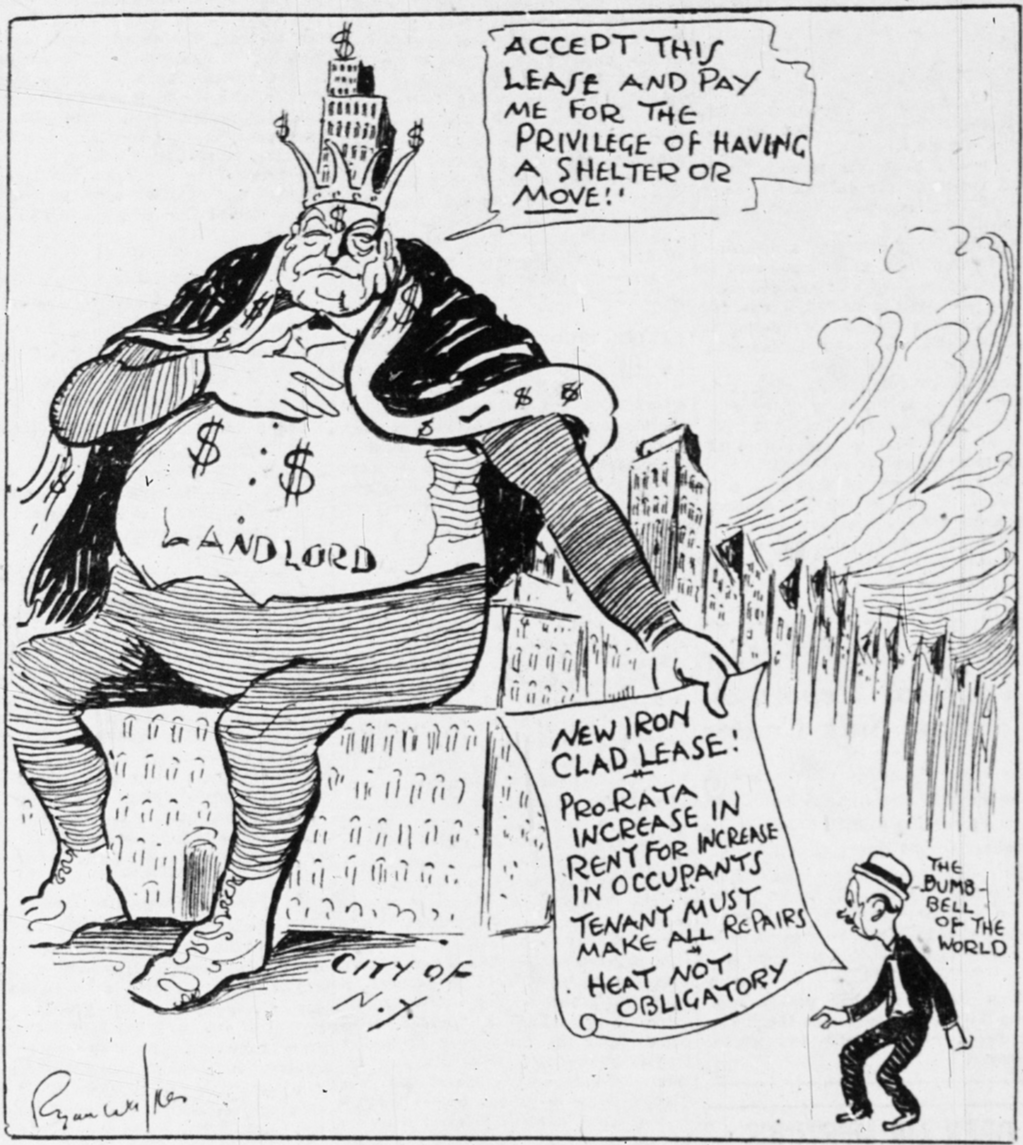
"The New Lease" New York Call July 12, 1923

In response to the prolonged period of conflict from 1918 to 1920 and the subsequent rent laws, landlords developed a series of new, long-term strategies to attempt to return the discretionary power they had before it. Two main strategies were the use of an "iron-clad" written, instead of oral, lease, which would list the responsibilities' of the landlord as minimally as possible alongside responsibilities for the tenant. This would lead to the eventual decline of oral leases and the related Moving Day tradition. (Note: Day 1999, p. 157–158, 161–165.) The second strategy was lease security deposits, which before then were almost completely non-existent among working class tenants. (Note: Day 1999, p. 157–158.) Both faced massive opposition from tenants and public outcry. The "iron-clad lease" created by UREO specifically attempted to waive away the rights of tenants guaranteed by the rent laws, and overturn building, safety, and heat ordinances in NYC. This was withdrawn after massive public backlash. (Note: Day 1999, p. 161–165.)

Oral leases were not necessarily to tenants' disadvantage in many cases, given the freedom it gave to move without legal reprisal and because they had some eviction protections established through common law for most of its existence. However, the coal crisis and lack of heating protections for oral leases became the major downside for tenants.

While the crisis did lead to the introduction of these strategies, oral leases generally, and the lack of requiring a security deposit, did continue among many leases through the 1930s and 1940s. It is unclear how broad the impact of the strategies were at the time. (Note: Day 1999, p. 165.)

=== Tenant organizing ===
As a result of the new laws, many of the Socialist and other radical striking tenant leagues lost their prominence. Much of their role was replaced by more conservative tenant groups, largely discouraging the use of rent strikes and instead focusing on the courts, lobbying, and other legal methods. (Note: Day 1999, p. 150–152.) (Note: copeland 2000, p. 22–23.)

The conservative tenant groups largely made maintaining the Emergency Rent Laws their primary purpose, alongside providing legal support to its primarily middle- to upper-class tenants. (Note: Day 1999, p. 150–167.) Eventually, the lack of ground organizing and refusal of more confrontational strategies by the new groups would lead to their decline, as the rent laws were slowly diminished and membership dwindled. (Note: lawson 1986a, p. 52–53.)

However, following the expiration of the Emergency Rent Laws in 1928 and 1929, the crisis of the Great Depression would lead to an entire new set of tenant organizing and strikes. New strategies such as eviction resistance, where activists would move belongings back in after they were removed and then stop it from occurring again, would be used during this period. (Note: Day 1999, p. 167–190.)

The very beginning of which would start in Harlem, On February, 1928 Richard B. Moore with other Harlem and Washington Heights residents would form the Harlem Tenants League (HTL). Moore heavily criticized how segregation made black tenants especially vulnerable to exploitation, and criticized the complicity of white and black landlords:

"The caste capitalist system which segregates Negro workers into Jim-crow districts makes these doubly exploited black workers the special prey of the greedy rent-gougers. Black and White landlords and real estate agents take advantage of this segregation to squeeze the last nickel out of the Negro working class who are penned into the 'black ghetto'.”

Black NYC tenants did not face the same relief from housing prices that their white counterparts received following the increase of apartment building after 1924. Due to segregation black residents had limited places to live, and could be used as an exploitable consumer base. Harlem for example did not experience the same uptick in building construction that white neighborhoods did after the war, no buildings were built between 1920–24 and only a few after 1924. In Manhattan from 1919 to 1926, black tenants’ rents increased from $21.64 to $41.77/month, according to the Commission of Housing and Regional Planning.

As the June 1, 1929 expiration approached Moore, Grace Campbell and other members of the HTL began organizing tenants in preparation. Hours after the Emergency Rent Laws' expiration, the league held a parade protest throughout Harlem alongside the Communist Party, the United Council of Working Class Housewives, the American Negro Labor Congress, and the Longshoremen's Union. They called for rent controls, and set the stage for what would become the 1931–1933 NYC rent strikes.

== See also ==
- 1919 New York City Harbor Strike
- US Strike wave of 1919
- Anti-Rent War
- 2024 Kansas City metropolitan area rent strike
