= Bernard H. Mendik =

American businessman

Bernard Hyman Mendik
- Born: May 29, 1929; Glasgow, Scotland
- Died: May 28, 2001 (aged 71)
- Education: City College of New York (BA); New York Law School (JD)
- Occupation: real estate developer
- Known for: founder of Mendik Company; Chairman of the Real Estate Board of New York
- Spouse(s): Annette Silverstein (divorced); Susan Batkin
- Children: 4

Bernard Hyman Mendik (May 29, 1929 – May 28, 2001) was an American real estate developer, founder of the Mendik Company, and chairman of the Real Estate Board of New York.

== Biography ==
Mendik was born to a Jewish family in Glasgow, Scotland, and emigrated to the United States as a child. His father was a handyman. He graduated from the Bronx High School of Science. In 1954, he graduated from City College of New York and in 1959, he received a J.D. from New York Law School where he met Larry Silverstein. After school, he married Silverstein's sister and joined her father's real estate business, Harry G. Silverstein & Sons. In 1966, Harry Silverstein died and Mendik and Larry Silverstein formed Silverstein & Mendik. The partnership was quite successful until Mendik divorced his wife in the late 1970s and the partnership ended. Mendik also cited disagreements over real estate strategies, with Mendik wanting to buy buildings while Silverstein wanted to build. They hired Jerry Speyer to assist in dividing the assets. Mendik then founded the Mendik Company.

In 1982, he joined the Real Estate Board of New York and in 1992, he served as its chairman until his death. Under his stewardship, the Real Estate Board persuaded the State Legislature to end or reduce real estate-related capital gains and transfer taxes; he also successfully promoted legislation legalizing real estate investment trusts in New York. In April 1997, Mendik folded his company into Vornado Realty Trust becoming Vornado's co-chairman for $654 million in stock and assumption of debt. The combination of the Mendik Company's seven midtown office buildings with 4 million square feet transformed Vornado, then primarily a holder of suburban malls, into a major player in New York City's office market. In October 1998, he resigned from Vornado.

Mendik taught at New York University from 1960 to 1987 and received the Fiorello La Guardia Award for civic achievement presented by New York City Mayor Rudolph Giuliani.

== Philanthropy ==
He endowed a library in his name at the New York Law School; a professorship in otolaryngology at New York University Medical Center; and supported research centers there and at Memorial Sloan-Kettering Cancer Center. He served as chairman of the Grand Central Partnership, as a trustee of the Citizens Budget Committee, as vice chairman of the Fifth Avenue Association, and on the board of regents of the Cathedral of St. John the Divine.

== Personal life ==
Mendik divorced his first wife, Annette Silverstein, sister of Larry Silverstein; they had three children: Laurie J. Mendik, Kevin R. Mendik, and Todd L. Mendik. Mendik's second wife was Susan Batkin; they had one child, Alexander M. Mendik. He was a member of Congregation Emanu-El of New York.
