= Real Estate Board of New York =

Real Estate Trade Association in New York

- Formation: 1896; 130 years ago
- Type: Trade association
- Location: New York City, United States
- Fields: Real estate
- Official language: English
- Website: rebny.com

The Real Estate Board of New York (REBNY) is a trade association for the real estate industry in New York City. Formed in 1896, it has been dubbed "the leading trade group advocating on policy changes in the real estate industry". Its current president is James Whelan.

== History and overview ==
The board was formed in 1896 to "facilitate transactions in real estate, such as buying, selling, leasing, mortgaging, and insuring of property and other business pertaining thereto. Among the current board members are the president John Banks, Fredrik Eklund and Daniel Brodsky.

Today, REBNY works to promote industry-backed policies. Its members frequently speak before government bodies to, among other things, expand New York's economy, encourage the development and renovation of commercial and residential real property, increase the city's appeal to a specific class of investors and residents, and facilitate property management for this same class. To help members hone their professional skills, the group conducts education programs, including state-certified required courses for licensing, continuing education courses, and free seminars. The group also performs research on residential and commercial conditions within the city.

In early 2015, the association represented the landlords of unsafe buildings in Councilmember Margaret Chin's downtown district and pushed back when approached about having to pay to move tenants while the buildings were being fixed. REBNY president Steve Spinola said, "This legislation would better protect tenants by strengthening the existing (Department of Housing Preservation and Development) program to relocate tenants instead of cutting into funds used for building repairs and maintenance."

=== Political donations ===
The group also backs political candidates deemed friendly to real estate companies, "Few industries gave more — and frequently in large amounts — than real estate." Thanks to the enactment of the 1994 New York state Limited liability company (LLC) law millions of dollars are donated to Albany and local politicians "from luxury residential buildings, office towers and parking garages controlled by some of New York City’s biggest tycoons." All owned by "LLCs, a structure shielded from New York’s tight restrictions on corporate campaign donations." Real estate developers "can give virtually unlimited sums each campaign season," privately and through the REBNY. "By influencing state elections, developers have undermined rent stabilization and preserved a key tax break that saves them far more money than they spend on political campaigns. The value of that subsidy, which is known as 421-a, has soared from $73 million in 1986 to an estimated $1.4 billion this year [2016]. In return for the tax benefit, owners are supposed to limit rent increases and set aside a portion of units in high-demand neighborhoods for below-market rents — though they often don’t fulfill their commitments." REBNY President James Whelan in January 2022 "indicated support for Gov. Kathy Hochul’s proposed Affordable Neighborhoods for New Yorkers program, a rebrand of the expiring 421-a tax break."

"REBNY members gave a tenth of all N.Y. campaign money," in 2015 "which represents only some of the political spending by New York’s real estate industry." Michael McKee, treasurer of Tenants PAC, said he "was concerned that state leaders would be more likely to heed REBNY’s positions than his own as a result of the contribution levels. (Tenants PAC and McKee contributed $61,565 to 2014 candidates.) “This is legalized bribery,” he said. “They’re quite used to buying what they want and getting it, and the legislature—both houses—has proven to be quite willing to give it to them.” Affordable housing and rent controlled apartments are disappearing as landlords exploit a "broken system, pushing out rent-regulated tenants and catapulting apartments into the free market."

For the 2013 political races in Brooklyn, REBNY created the Jobs for New York PAC, a pro-development political action committee to support controversial Brooklyn councilwoman Laurie Cumbo and other candidates. The PAC gave Cumbo at least $80,000 through August 2013, an unpopular move with residents in a rapidly gentrifying area. (In an AARP-sponsored discussion a week later, Cumbo claimed that she received no money from it.)

=== Lobbying ===
REBNY also started "Putting New Yorkers to Work, Inc.", a lobbying group that funds ads by groups like Affordable Housing and Local Jobs Now to counter union groups pushing for wage requirements for the building of new affordable housing.

== Notable officers ==
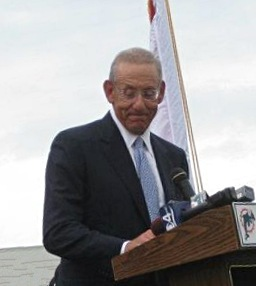
Stephen M. Ross

- Clint Blume (1898–1973), president; Major League Baseball pitcher
- Bernard H. Mendik (1929–2001), chairman; founder of the Mendik Company
- Stephen M. Ross (born 1940) chair emeritus; chairman of Related Companies
- Jerry Speyer (born 1940), chair emeritus; one of two founding partners of Tishman Speyer
- Mary Ann Tighe (born 1948), chair; CEO of the New York Tri-State Region of CBRE
- Robert Tishman (1916–2010)), chair; one of two founding partners of Tishman Speyer
- John Eugene Zuccotti (1937–2015), chairman; U.S. chairman of Brookfield Properties
