= Robert and Anne Dickey House =

House in Manhattan, New York

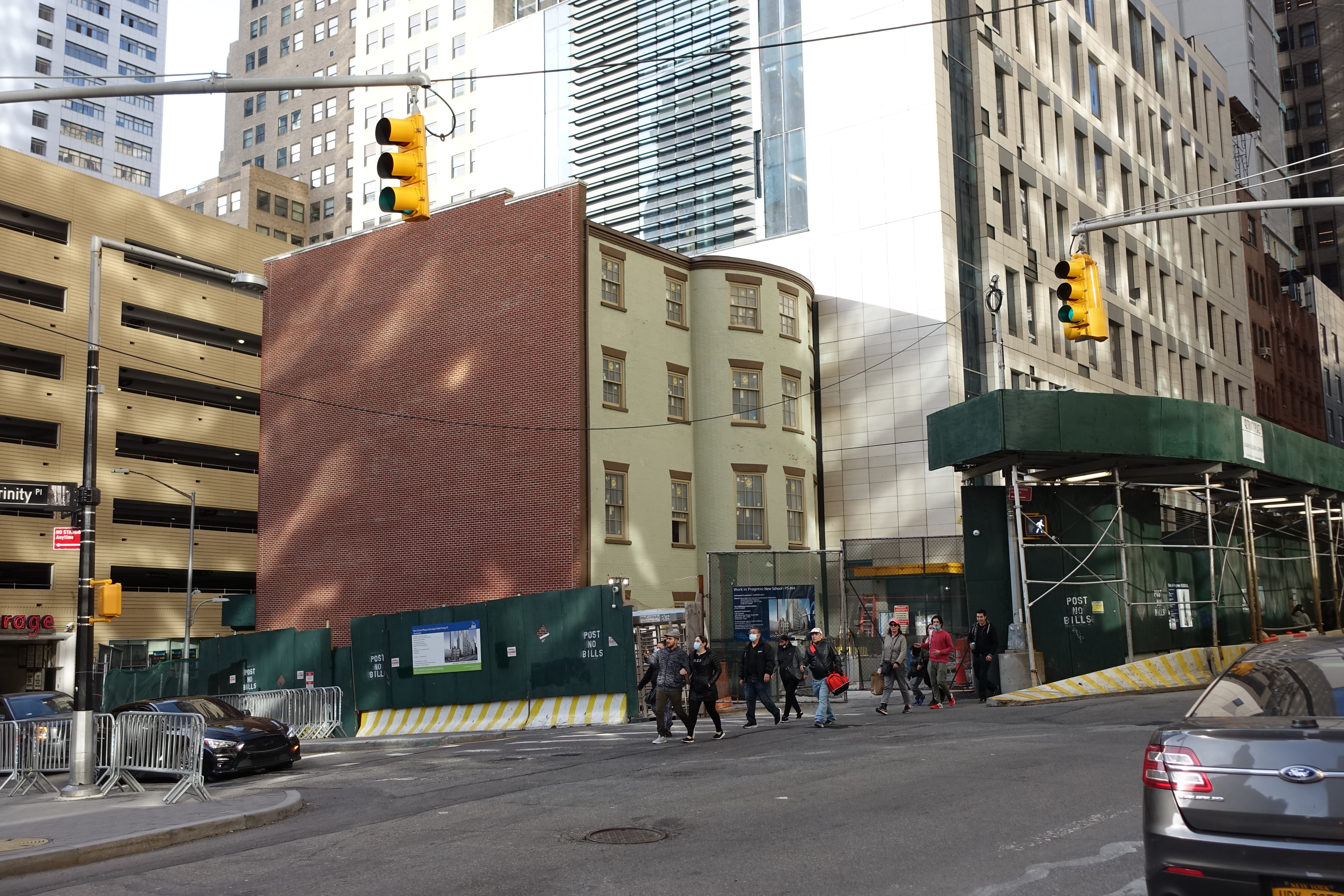
- The house in 2022, looking from Trinity Place

General information
- Architectural style: Federal
- Location: 67 Greenwich Street; Financial District, Manhattan, New York
- Coordinates: 40°42′26″N 74°00′49″W
- Construction started: 1809
- Completed: 1810

Technical details
- Floor count: 4

New York City Landmark
- Designated: June 28, 2005
- Reference no.: 2166

The Robert and Anne Dickey House, also referred to as the Robert Dickey House or by its address 67 Greenwich Street, is a Federal-style building in the Financial District of Lower Manhattan in New York City. The site is bounded by Edgar Street to the south, Greenwich Street to the west, and Trinity Place to the east. It is named after Robert Dickey, a 19th-century New York merchant, and his wife Anne, who both resided in the house. Erected circa 1810, it is one of the few remaining Federal-style buildings in the city, and became a New York City designated landmark in 2005. Having stood for over 200 years, surviving the construction of several subway lines and the Brooklyn–Battery Tunnel, as well as the September 11 attacks, the building has been labeled as a "Robert Moses survivor" and "The Indestructible Townhouse".

At the time of its landmarking, the building stood vacant and in disrepair. Beginning in the late 2010s, the Dickey House was restored as part of the construction of the adjacent 77 Greenwich Street apartment tower, to be used as part of Public School 150.

== Site ==
The Dickey House is the south end of a block bounded by Edgar Street to the south, Greenwich Street to the west, Trinity Place to the east, and Rector Street to the north. Immediately to the house's north was a former Syms Corporation store, demolished in 2017 to make way for the future 77 Greenwich Street tower. Located to the south across Edgar Street is Elizabeth H. Berger Plaza. Also immediately to the south are the approaches to the Brooklyn–Battery Tunnel. To the west and north at Greenwich and Rector Streets is 88 Greenwich Street. One block north of the site on Trinity Place are Trinity Church and the American Stock Exchange Building. To the immediate southwest across the Battery Tunnel approaches is 21 West Street.

The Dickey House is directly served by several New York City Subway stops. The Rector Street station of the IRT Broadway–Seventh Avenue Line (1 train) is located under Greenwich Street, and a station of the same name is located on the BMT Broadway Line (N, R, and W trains) under Trinity Place. The Wall Street and Bowling Green stations of the IRT Lexington Avenue Line (4 and 5 trains) are located under Broadway east of the site. The M55 local bus serves the site on Trinity Place (northbound) and Broadway (southbound). Numerous express bus routes to/from outer boroughs also operate in the area. The Staten Island Ferry Whitehall Terminal is located south of the site, connected by the subway or bus.

== Architecture ==
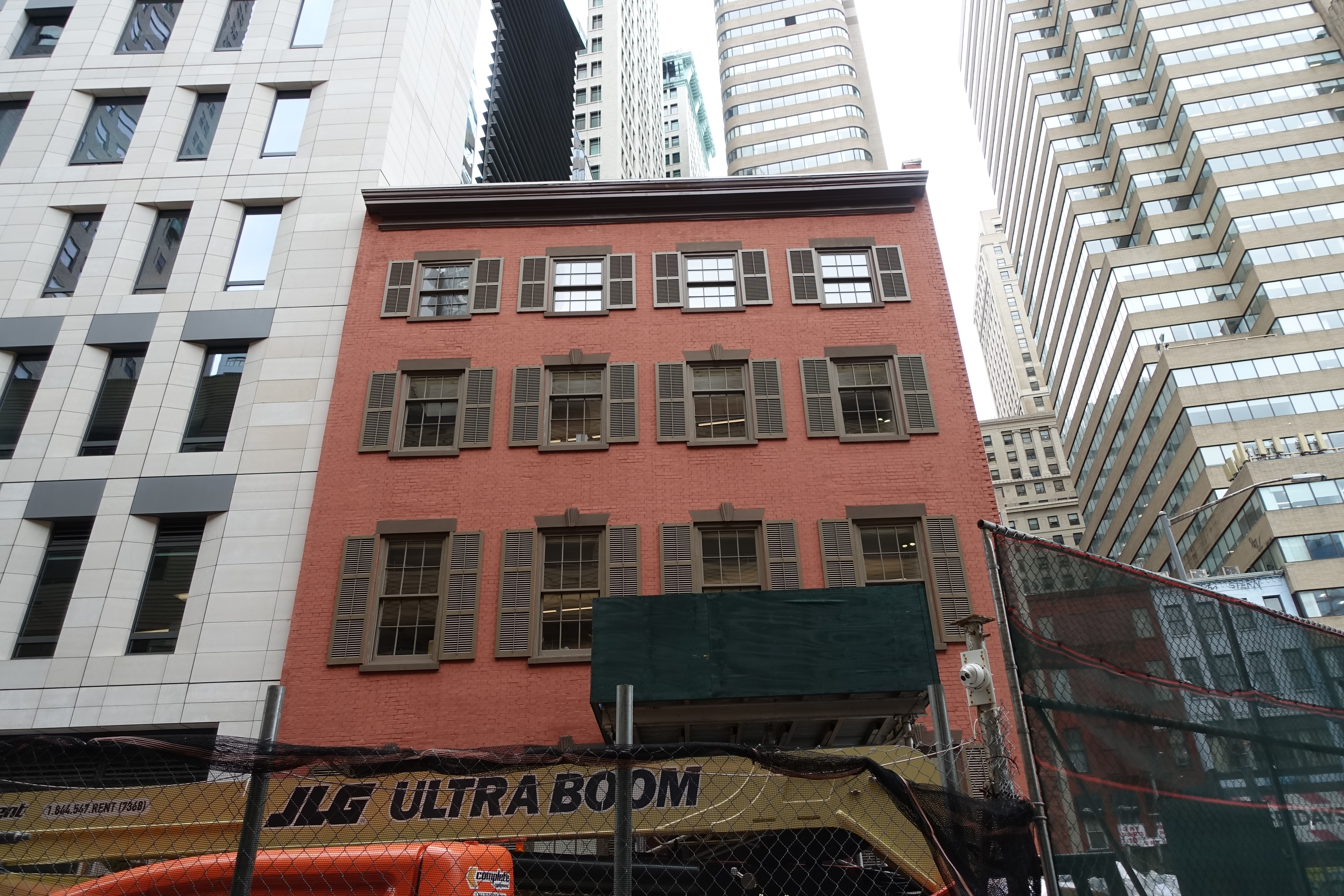
The original front face of the building on Greenwich Street in 2022, following restoration.

The building was designed by an unknown architect in the Federal style. The design has been erroneously attributed to Pierre Charles L'Enfant. As originally constructed the house was 3 1/2 stories tall, with the top 1/2 story occupied by a peaked roof. An 1872 alteration by architect Detlef Lienau replaced the peaked roof with a fourth story capped by a flat roof with a metal cornice. The front face of the building on Greenwich Street is flat and four-windows wide. The bottom floor is utilized for retail space.

As of 2011, the Dickey House is one of only seven surviving pre-1810 houses located south of Chambers Street. The building, however, has been in disrepair since the turn of the 21st century. Currently, the house is hollowed out, with its roof and chimney removed to facilitate construction of 77 Greenwich, after which the building will be restored in the original style. As a result, only three outer faces (Greenwich, Edgar, Trinity) currently make up the building, while the construction and restoration are ongoing.

=== Form and facade ===
The rear face of the building on Trinity Street is five bays wide. It features an "elliptical" or "bow-shaped" facade, which occupies the northernmost three windows and extends outward towards the street. This was an original design feature, and the 1872 remodeling maintained this element for the fourth floor. The elliptical design has been compared to that of buildings in Boston. The ellipse originally faced a garden on the property.

The south facade on Edgar Street contains a chimney and no windows. It was originally adjacent to another building, until that building was demolished and Edgar Street was relocated north to front the building during the construction of the Battery Tunnel in the 1940s. Windows may have existed on this face in the past. The south face was later used as a billboard. The outer facade of the house consists of red brick, but the front (Greenwich) and rear (Trinity) faces have been painted gray. A one-story "commercial addition" was constructed in 1922 on the Trinity Place side of the building. This addition was most recently used as a tavern.

As part of the construction of 77 Greenwich Street, the Dickey House will be renovated and converted for use as a public elementary school building. The school will occupy both the house and portions of the lower floors of the tower. The exterior will be restored to its 19th-century condition. The 1922-built retail addition, considered non-historical, will be removed to create a new entrance to the building. Part of the new tower will cantilever over the house. The project was designed by FXFOWLE. The house will be renovated by the New York City School Construction Authority.

== History ==
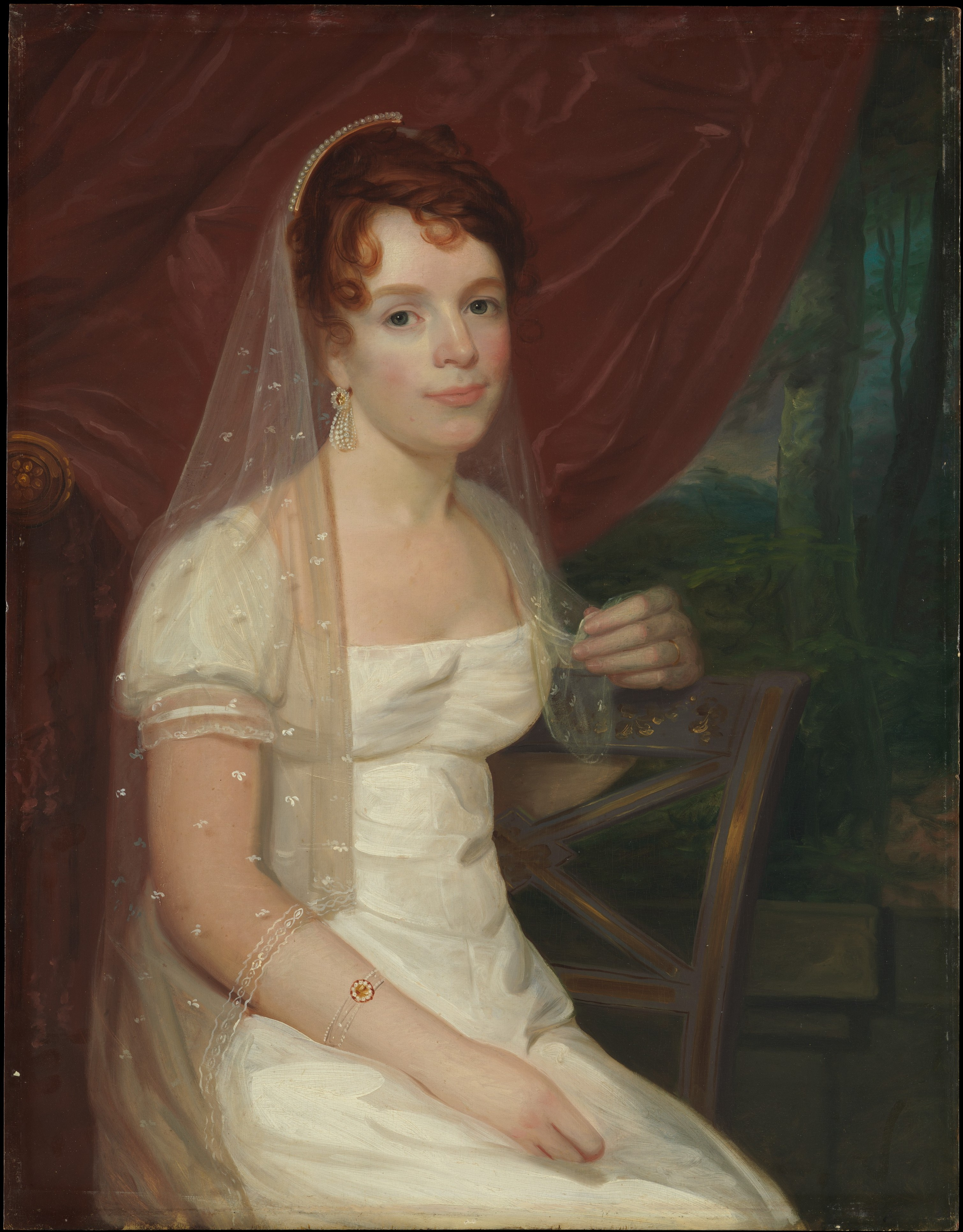
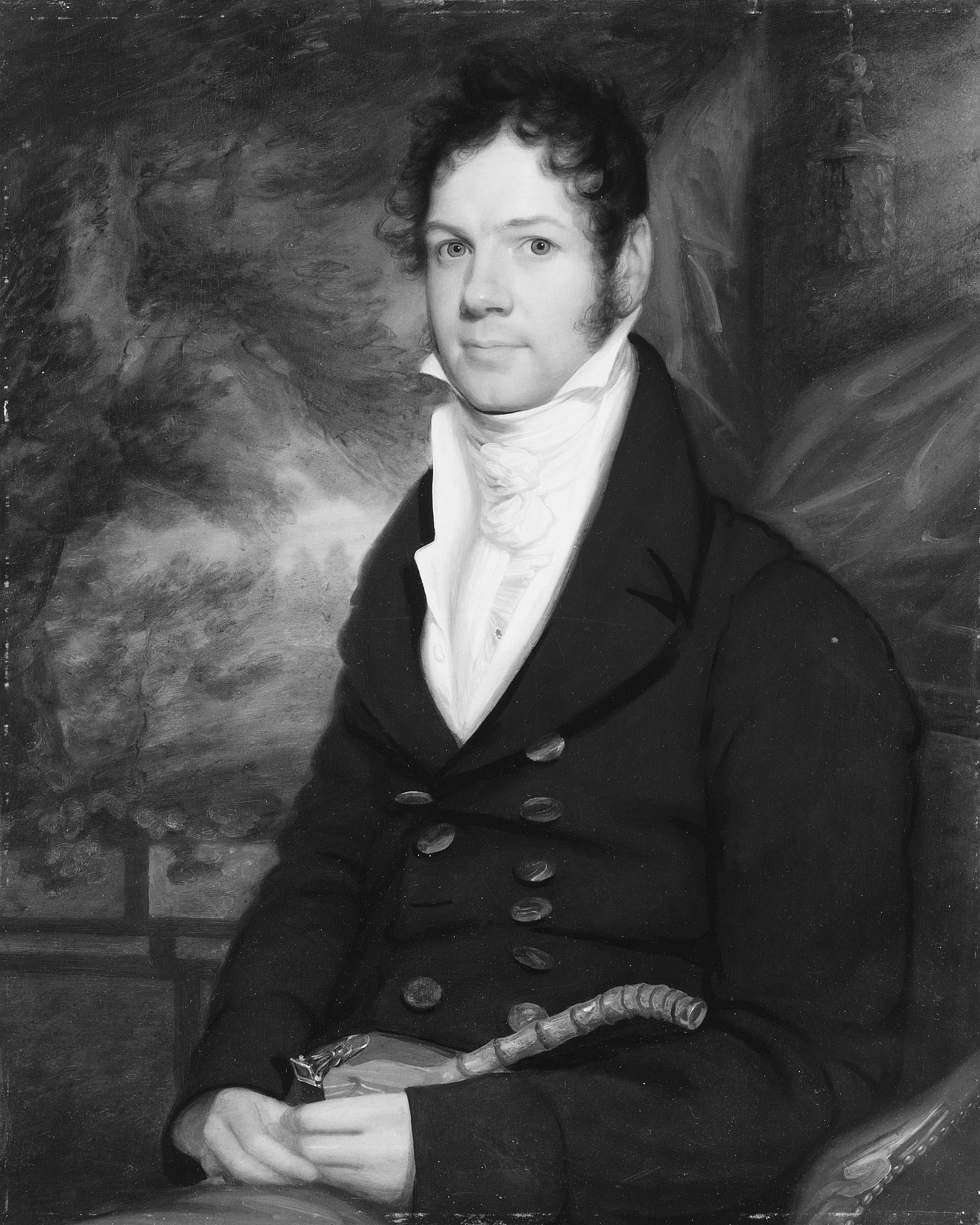
Paintings of Anne Dickey (left) and Robert Dickey circa 1810, by John Wesley Jarvis

Robert Dickey and Anne Dickey (née Brown) were both born in what is now Northern Ireland, and later emigrated to the United States. Robert Dickey arrived in the U.S. in 1798. The two married in Baltimore, Maryland in 1807. Robert Dickey was a spice merchant, whose fortunes put him among the wealthiest men in New York City at the time.

The lower ends of Greenwich Street and Trinity Place were created circa 1790, when a "bluff" created by the Hudson River tides was leveled and filled in order to be developed.

=== Construction and 19th century ===
In 1809, Robert Dickey purchased three lots at the south end of Greenwich Street. Two of the lots were originally owned by Comfort Sands and given to his daughters in 1796. One of his daughters was the wife of New York banker and broker Nathaniel Prime. Dickey proceeded to construct two houses on the site, addressed 69 and 71 Greenwich Street (later 65 and 67). Stables and a storehouse fronting Trinity Place (then called Lumber Street) were also built on adjacent lots. At the time, Greenwich Street was known as "Millionaire's Row" and later called the "Original Park Avenue", and the two houses were among numerous other Federal-style rowhouses on the street. Dickey acquired the adjacent 73 Greenwich Street (future 69 Greenwich) in 1816, while selling 69 Greenwich. He operated his business ventures from the rear of the property on Lumber Street. In 1821, Dickey sold the two remaining houses. In 1822, the New York City Common Council established the modern building addresses on Greenwich Street; 71 Greenwich Street was renamed 67 Greenwich Street.

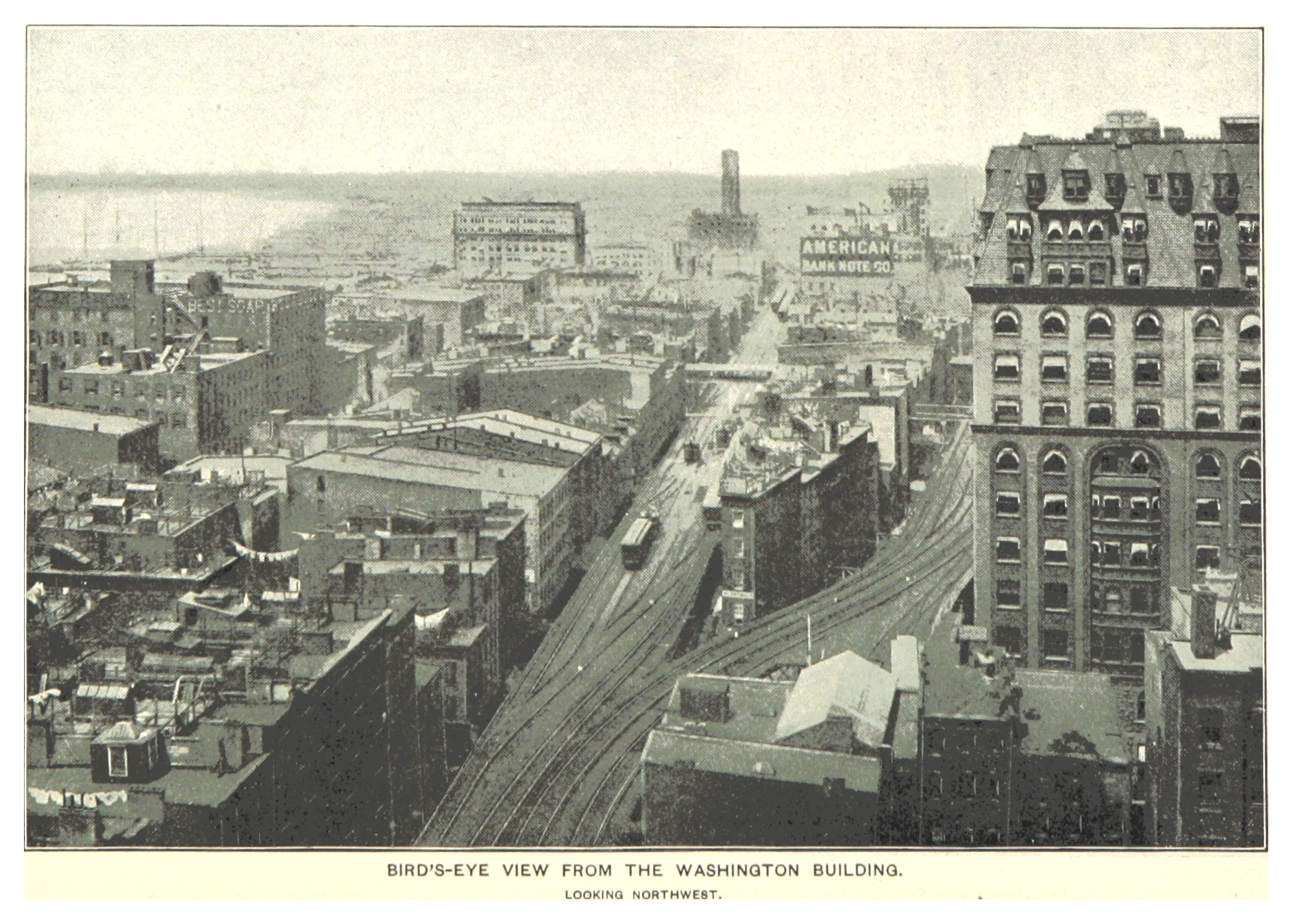
The Ninth Avenue (left) and Sixth Avenue (right) elevated lines merging near the Dickey House circa 1893

The house was transferred to Peter Schermerhorn (brother of Abraham Schermerhorn) in 1823, and the Schermerhorn family owned the building through the 19th century. During this time, the house was rented out to prominent New Yorkers. These included William Bayard Jr., Nicholas Low, and Ezra Ludlow (father of William H. Ludlow). It also served as the French Consulate building from 1830 to 1831. By the 1840s, it became a boarding house.

In the late 1860s, construction began on the Ninth Avenue Elevated railroad along Greenwich Street in front of the house. The elevated line opened in 1868. Shortly afterwards, the Sixth Avenue Line was erected above Trinity Place (then called New Church Street), with the two lines merging at Morris Street. This meant that both the front and rear faces of the Dickey House were obstructed by elevated tracks. In April 1871, the house was among several in Lower Manhattan raided by police under the suspicion of prostitution. In 1872, Peter's son Edmund Schermerhorn contracted Detlef Lienau to remodel the house, removing the hipped roof and adding the building's fourth floor. By this time, the building was used as a tenement, with the original upper class residents of the neighborhood having relocated uptown and immigrants taking their place. An 1890 police census reported 57 tenants of Irish descent occupying the house.

=== Early and mid-20th century ===
The house was sold in 1919 to Rose A. McGuigan. One year later, McGuigan (also spelled "McGuigman") filed plans to convert the house and the adjacent 65 Greenwich Street property into a six-story office building. Around this time, the surrounding neighborhood west of Greenwich Street developed into an Arab immigrant community known as Little Syria. In 1922, the one-story shop extension was constructed on Trinity Place.

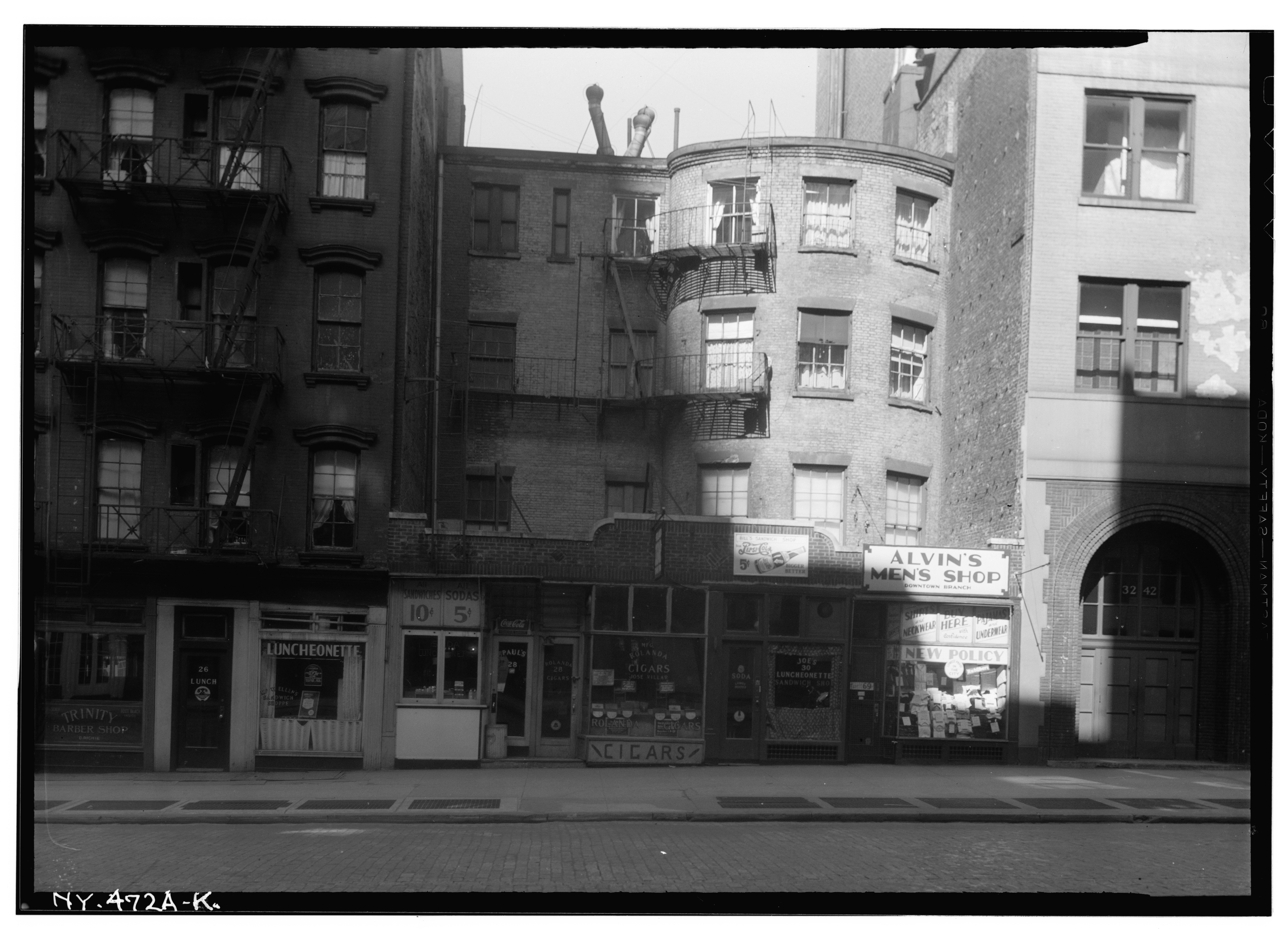
The Dickey House looking from Trinity Place in 1940. Note the adjacent buildings on both sides, and the one-story shops in front of the house.

The Sixth and Ninth Avenue elevated lines were closed in 1938 and 1940 respectively, and dismantled in the 1940s. During the construction of the Brooklyn–Battery Tunnel in that decade, numerous buildings in the neighborhood were demolished. This included many on Greenwich Street, and most of Little Syria. The Dickey House, however, remained, with Edgar Street moved north to the south face of the house. Because of this, the house would later be described as a "Robert Moses survivor".

In 1960, the Dickey House was purchased by brothers-in-law Irving Schachter and Eli Goldhagen. At this time, the building was used by a paper company.

=== Landmark status and redevelopment ===
The house was first nominated for possible landmark status in 1967. On February 11, 1991, the New York State Historic Preservation Office identified the building as a potential state or national landmark. By the turn of the 21st century, the house was in a state of disrepair. Following the September 11 attacks, the building was vacated. On June 28, 2005, the house was designated as a city landmark by the New York City Landmarks Preservation Commission. The designation was opposed by Martha Schachter Schessel and Harry Schessel, who were the owners of the house and the descendants of Irving Schachter. They wanted the building to be demolished. The family claimed restoration costs would run to $6 million.

In 2008, it was revealed that the Syms Corporation, who owned and operated a store in the adjacent building (42 Trinity Place), planned to develop a multi-story tower on the shop site. To do this, they would need to purchase air rights from adjacent buildings including the Dickey House. In May 2008, Syms purchased the Dickey House. In November 2011, Syms filed for bankruptcy and closed all of its locations in January 2012.

Beginning in late 2014, Syms (now reorganized as Trinity Place Holdings) planned to construct a residential and retail tower on the former store. By 2016, the project was named 77 Greenwich Street. The plan would incorporate the Dickey House into the development, renovating the house for use as an elementary school. Demolition of the Syms building was complete in October 2017. At this time, the chimney and north face of 67 Greenwich were removed, and metal support beams were installed to maintain the house's structural integrity.
