= Rector Street station (BMT Broadway Line) =

New York City Subway station in Manhattan

Rector Street
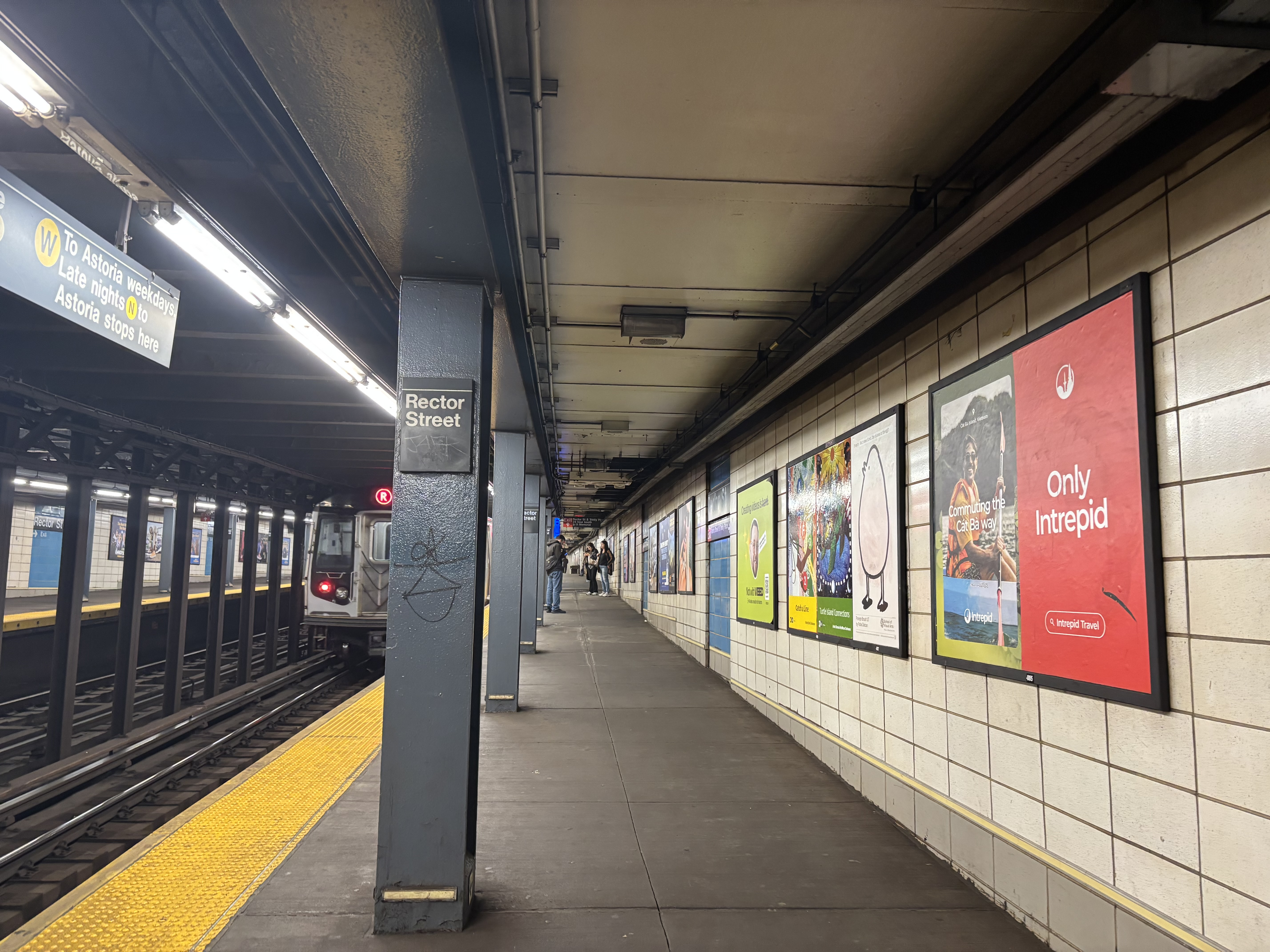
- Northbound platform view with an R train leaving

Station statistics
- Address: Rector Street & Trinity Place; New York, New York
- Borough: Manhattan
- Locale: Financial District
- Coordinates: 40.70771°N 74.013004°W
- Division: B (BMT)
- Line: BMT Broadway Line
- Services: N (late nights); R (all except late nights); W (weekdays only)
- Transit: NYCT Bus: M55, X27, X28, SIM1, SIM1C, SIM2, SIM3C, SIM4, SIM4C, SIM15, SIM32, SIM33C, SIM34; MTA Bus: BxM18, BM1, BM2, BM3, BM4
- Structure: Underground
- Platforms: 2 side platforms
- Tracks: 2

Other information
- Opened: January 5, 1918; 108 years ago
- Accessible: No; planned (Elevator under construction for downtown platform only)

Traffic
- 2025: 1,252,243 ▲3.5%
- Rank: 266 out of 423
Services
Preceding station	New York City Subway	Following station
Cortlandt Street N R W via Lexington Avenue–59th Street	R (New York City Subway service) W (New York City Subway service)	Whitehall Street–South Ferry N R W services split
Location
Location within New York City Subway
Location within New York City
Location within New York
Track layout
Street map
Station service legend
Symbol	Description
Stops all times except late nights	Stops all times except late nights
Stops weekdays during the day	Stops weekdays during the day
Stops late nights only	Stops late nights only

The Rector Street station is a local station on the BMT Broadway Line of the New York City Subway. Located at the corner of Rector Street and Trinity Place in Financial District, Lower Manhattan, it is served by the W train on weekdays, and by the R train at all times except late nights, when the N train takes over service.

== History ==
The Rector Street station on the Brooklyn–Manhattan Transit Corporation (BMT)'s Broadway Line opened on January 5, 1918. The station's platforms originally could only fit six 67-foot-long (20 m) cars. In 1926, the New York City Board of Transportation received bids for the lengthening of platforms at nine stations on the Broadway Line, including the Rector Street station, to accommodate eight-car trains. Edwards & Flood submitted a low bid of $101,775 for the project. The platform-lengthening project was completed in 1927, bringing the length of the platforms to 535 feet (163 m). The city government took over the BMT's operations on June 1, 1940. The station was temporarily closed for six weeks after the September 11 attacks, reopening on October 27, 2001.

== Station layout ==
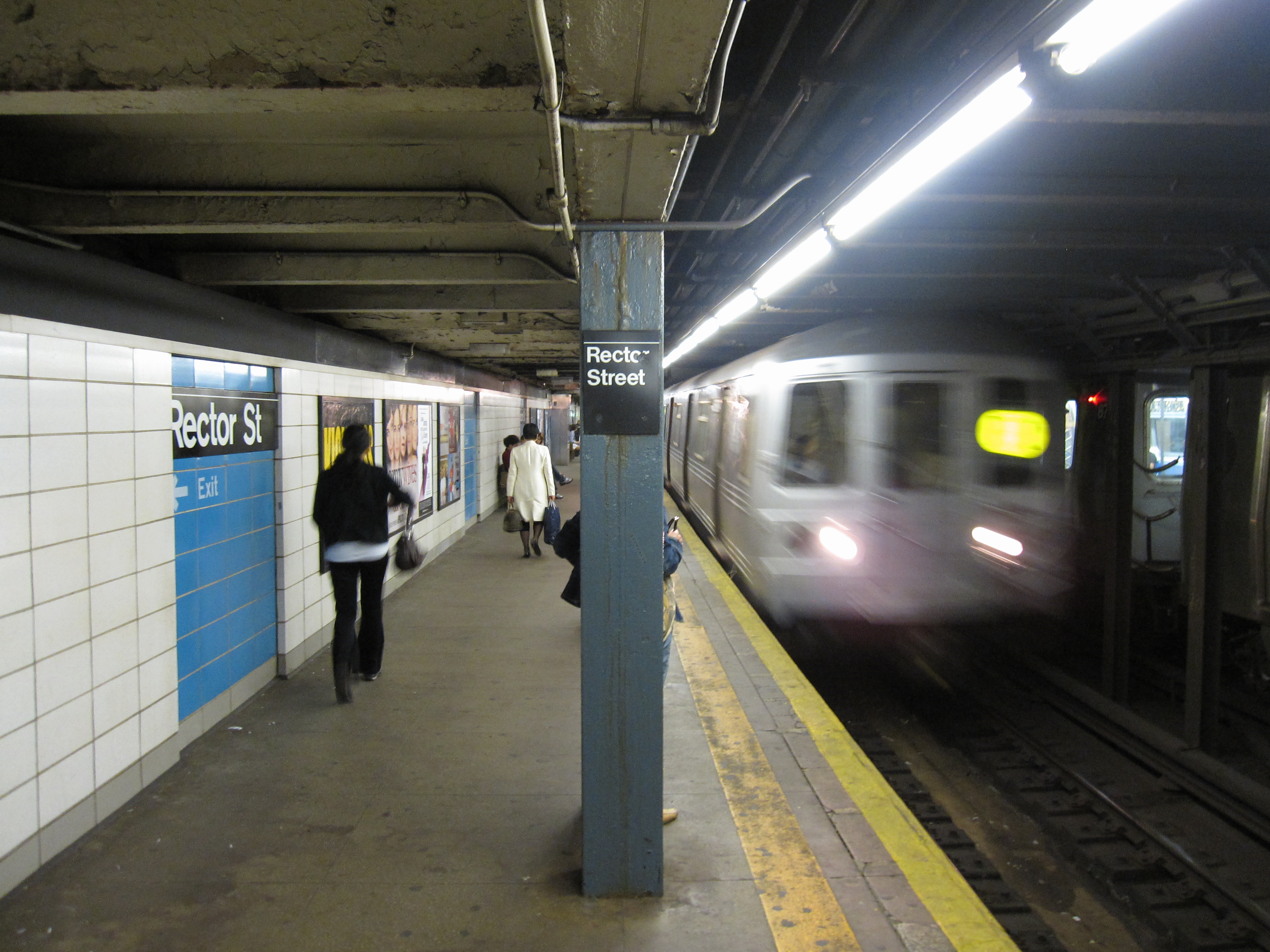
Uptown R train of R46 cars arriving

Since the station is on a grade, there is a noticeable slant. The station has two side platforms, and there are no overpasses, underpasses, or mezzanines to connect the platforms within fare control. The station was overhauled in the late 1970s. The original trim lines were replaced with white cinderblock tiles, except for small recesses in the walls, which contain blue-painted cinderblock tiles. The staircases were repaired and new platform edges were installed. The blue cinderblock field contains the station-name signs and white text pointing to the exits. The renovation also replaced incandescent lighting with fluorescent lighting.

The uptown platform maintains one old style sign while at the north end of the downtown/Brooklyn platform is an entire closed off portion of the platform. There are several (painted over) old style Rector Street mosaic signs on this platform.

Directly to the south, the BMT Broadway Line curves southeast under the Cunard Building and Bowling Green Offices Building to reach the Whitehall Street station.

=== Exits ===
Each platform has its own platform-level fare controls. The full-time exit is at the north end of the station, at Rector Street and Trinity Place. The uptown platform contains a token booth and three street stairs: two to the northeast corner of the aforementioned intersection, and one to the southeast corner. The downtown platform is unstaffed and has four street stairs: two to the southwest corner and two to the northwest corner.

Just south of the fare control for the downtown platform, there are two exit-only turnstiles leading to an exit-only stair to the western side of Trinity Place.

At the extreme south end of the station, there is another street stair from the uptown platform to the northwest corner of Greenwich and Morris Streets, directly across from Elizabeth H. Berger Plaza and the entrance to the separate Rector Street station on the IRT Broadway–Seventh Avenue Line.

The downtown platform is proposed to become ADA-accessible with the construction of an elevator leading from an easement in 50 Trinity Place to the downtown platform. The elevator's installation was required per zoning regulations, which mandated that the developers of 77 Greenwich Street (also known as 42 Trinity Place) fund transit improvements at the station. However, whether the elevator will be installed has been unknown since April 2020 due to various lawsuits involving the MTA and FIT Investment Corp (the developer for 50 Trinity Place).

== Nearby points of interest ==
- 65 Broadway
- American Stock Exchange Building
- Cunard Building
- Empire Building
- Robert and Anne Dickey House
- Trinity Church

== Image gallery ==
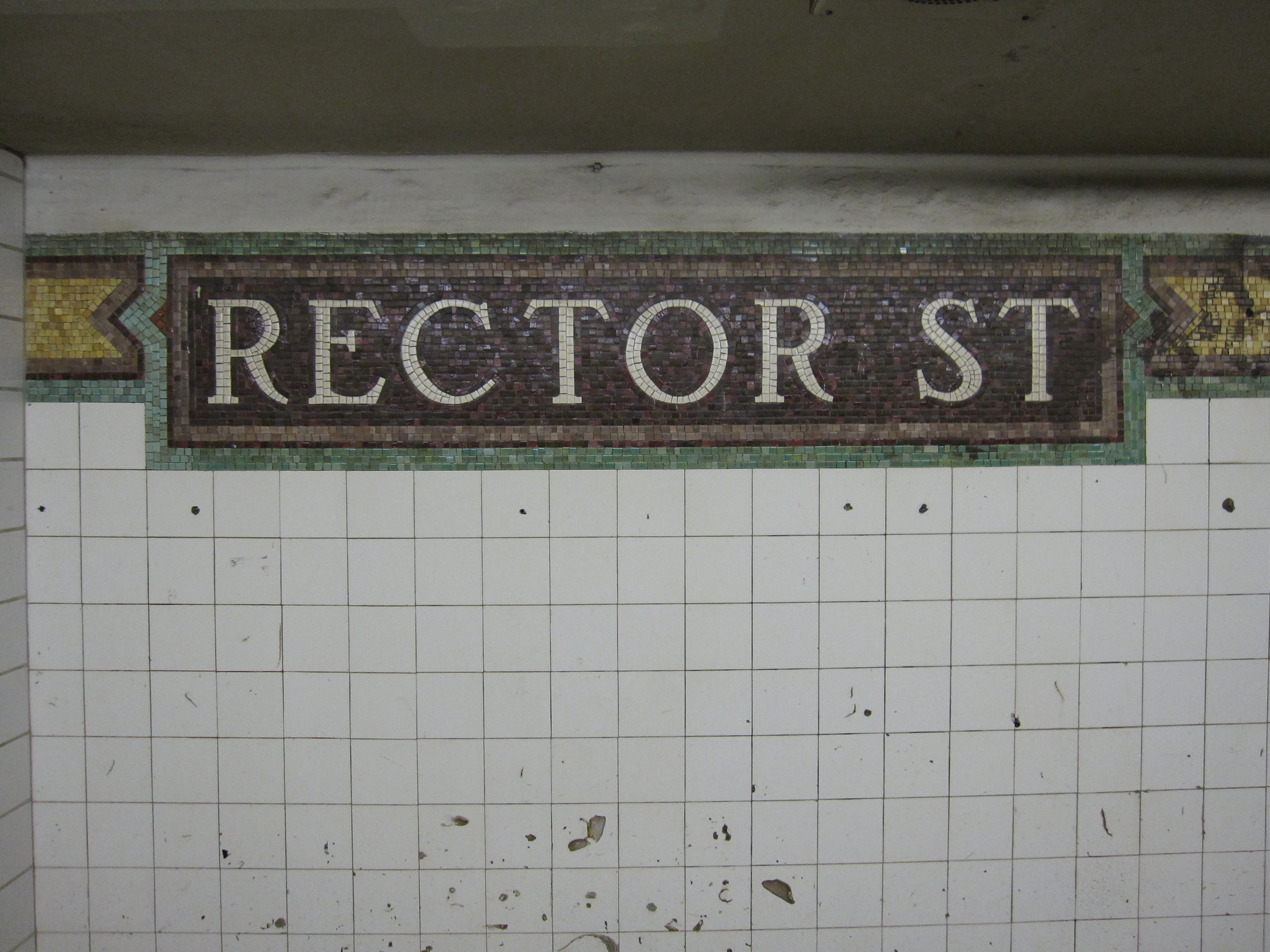
Remaining part of the original tiles and mosaics on the uptown platform

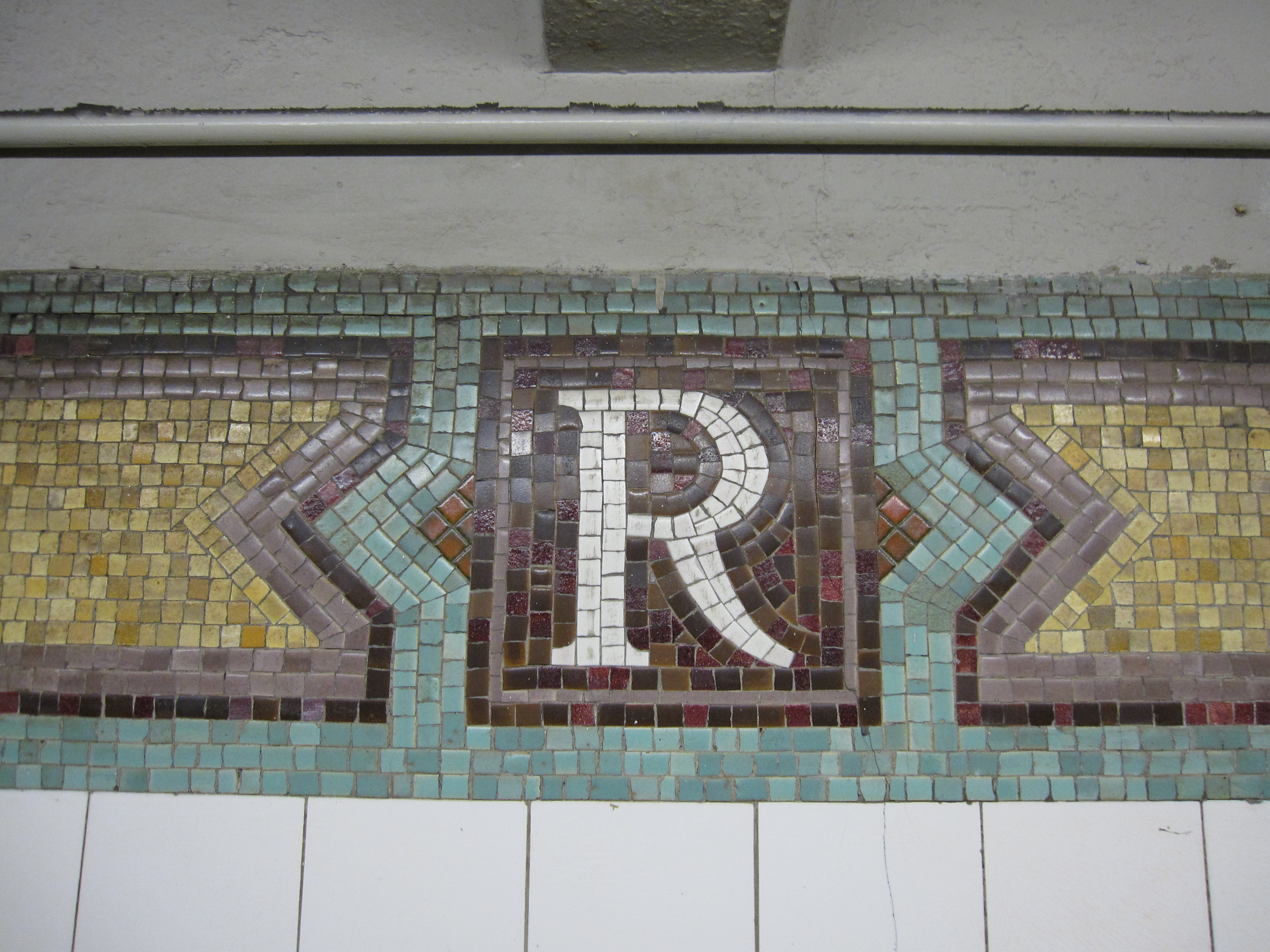
Mosaic

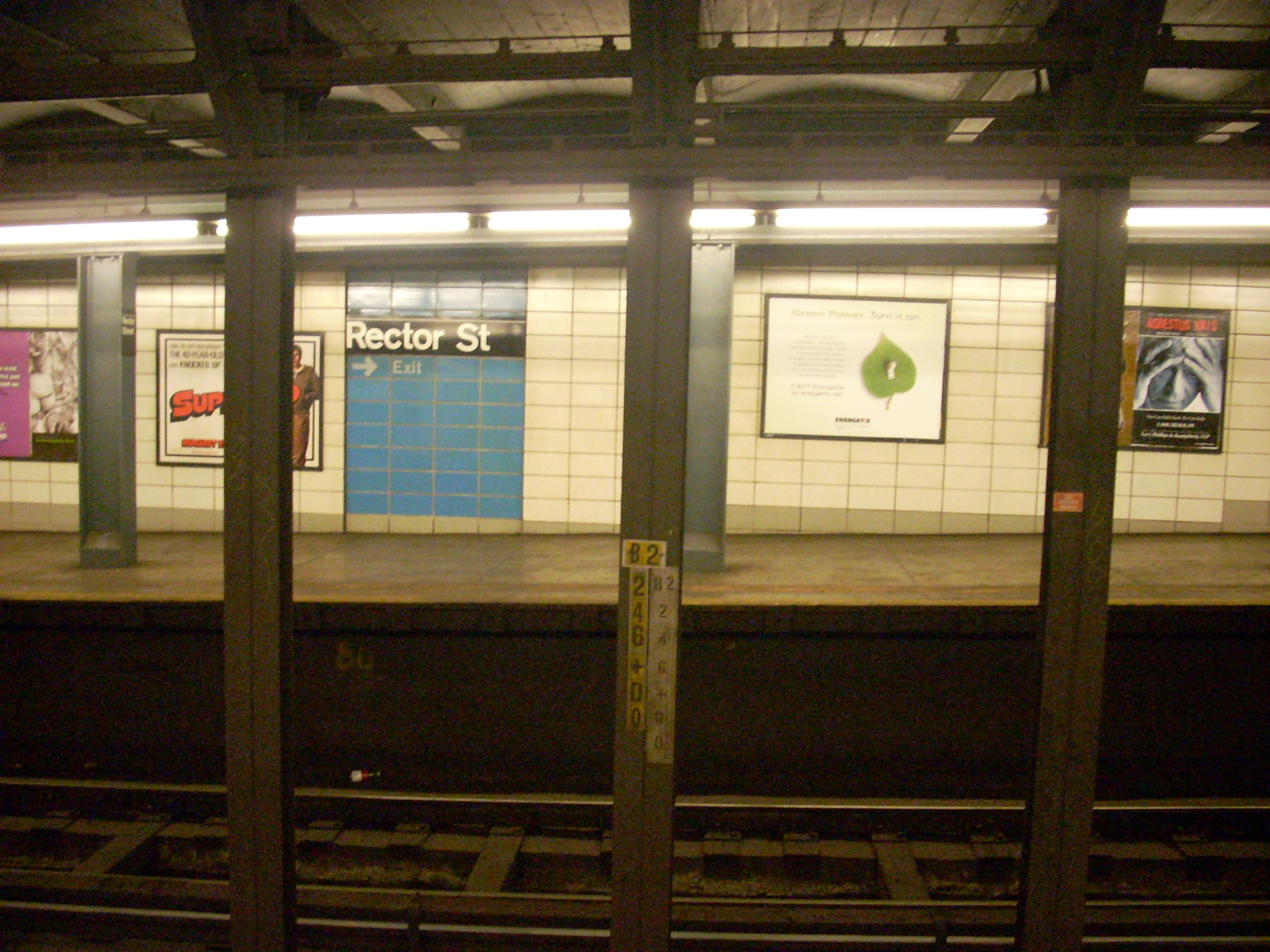
Slant of the platform, this station being on a grade

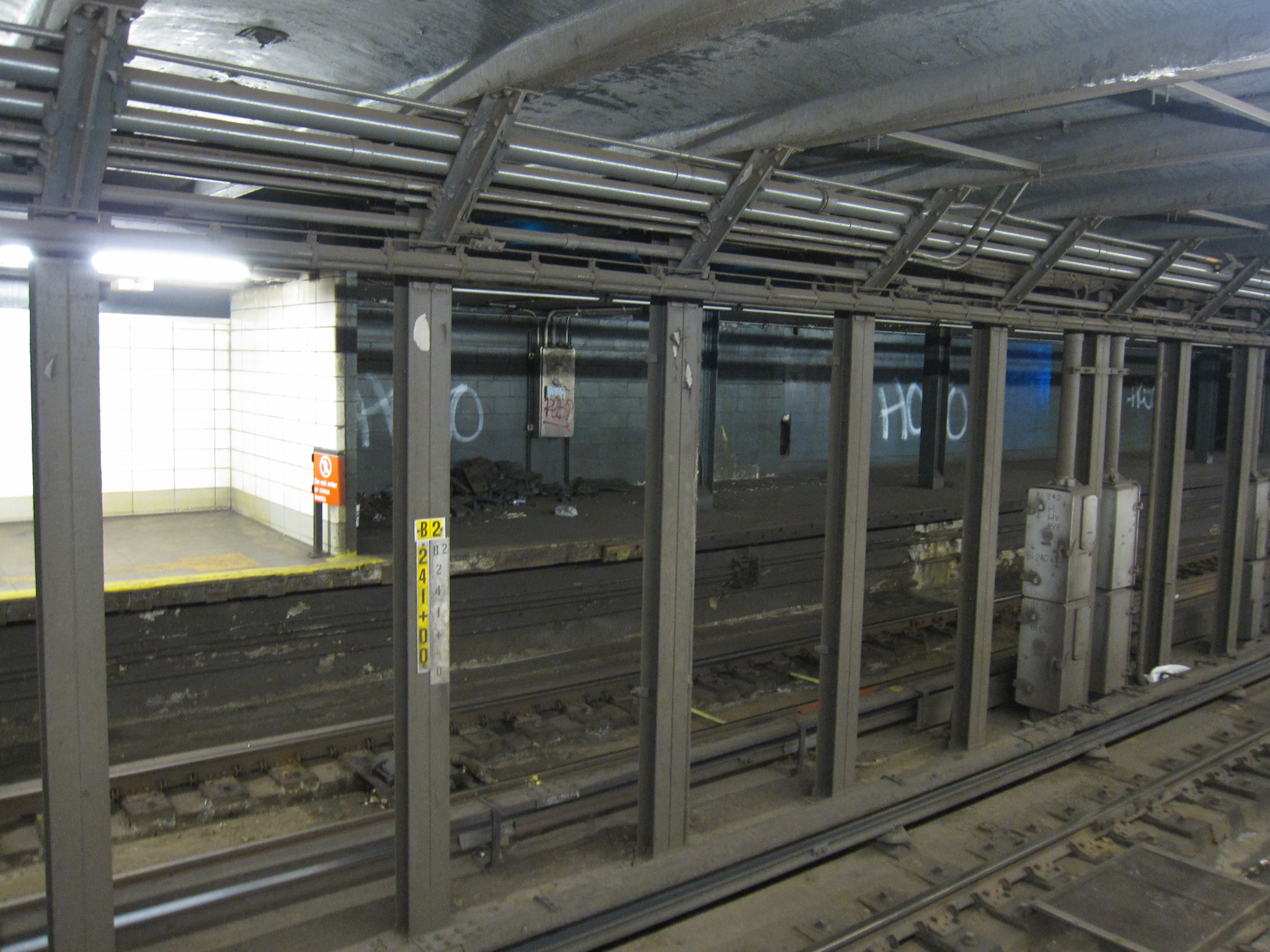
Part of the platform on the southbound side that is walled off

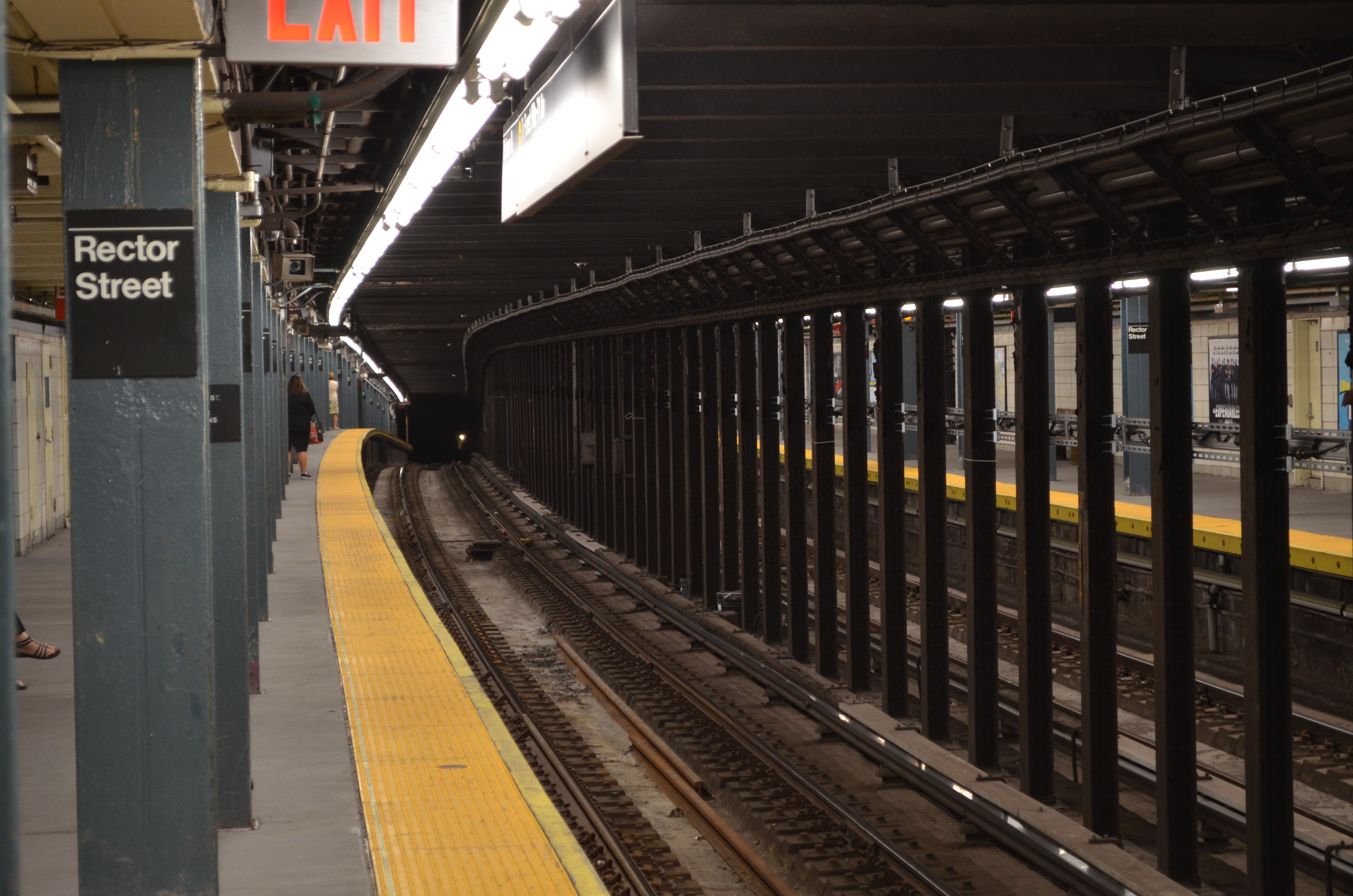
Station slope
