= WTC Cortlandt station =

New York City Subway station in Manhattan

WTC Cortlandt
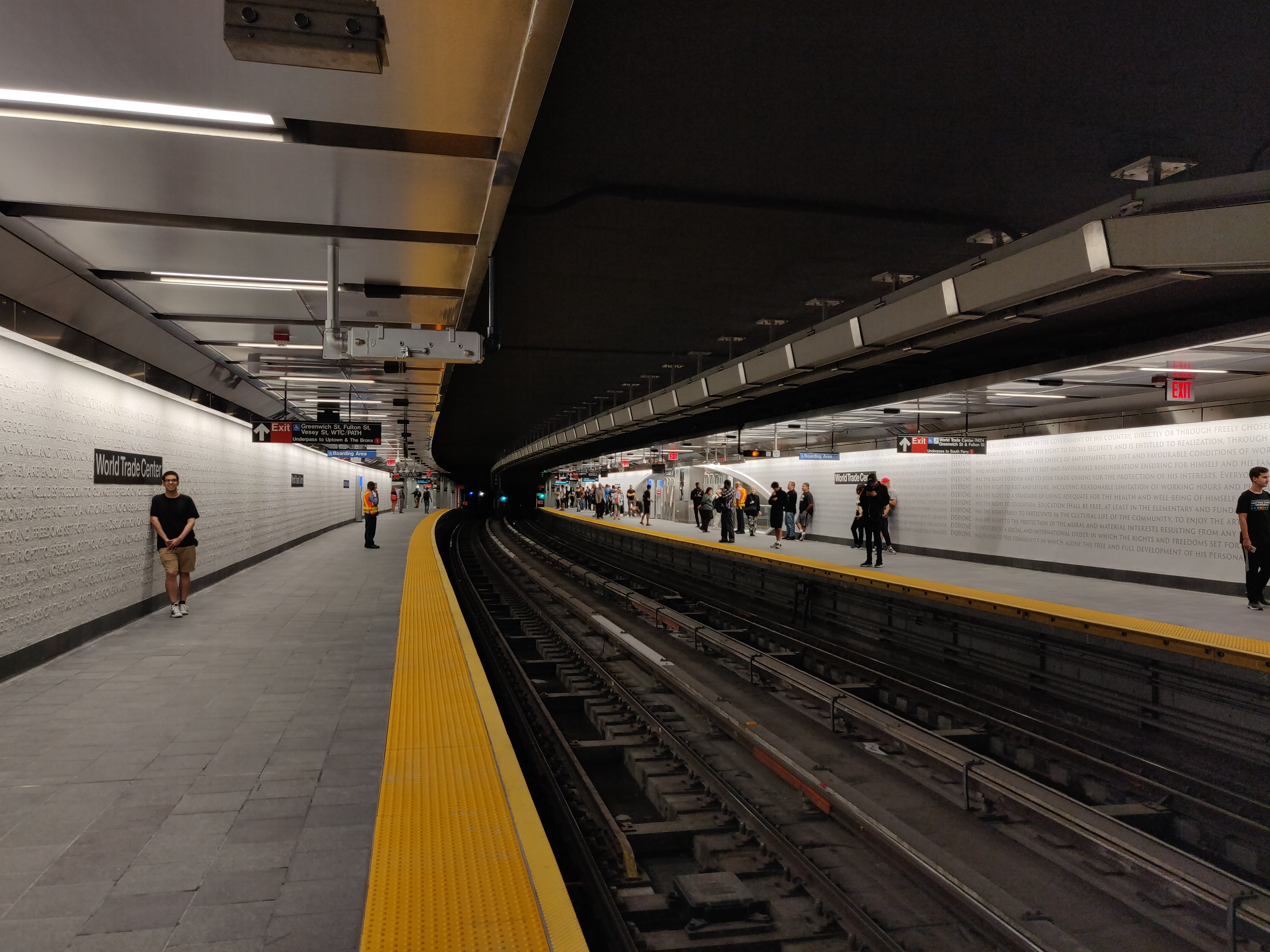
- Station platforms on reopening day, facing north

Station statistics
- Address: 180 Greenwich Street, New York, New York
- Borough: Manhattan
- Locale: Financial District, World Trade Center
- Coordinates: 40.7110°N 74.0124°W
- Division: A (IRT)
- Line: IRT Broadway–Seventh Avenue Line
- Services: 1 (all times)
- Transit: At Chambers Street–World Trade Center/Park Place/Cortlandt Street: 2 (all times); 3 (all except late nights); A (all times); C (all except late nights); E (all times); N (late nights); R (all except late nights); W (weekdays only); PATH: NWK–WTC, HOB–WTC (at World Trade Center)
- Structure: Underground
- Platforms: 2 side platforms
- Tracks: 2

Other information
- Opened: July 1, 1918; 108 years ago
- Closed: September 11, 2001; 25 years ago (destroyed during the September 11 terrorist attacks)
- Reopened: September 8, 2018; 8 years ago
- Accessible: Yes
- Former/other names: Cortlandt Street; World Trade Center

Traffic
- 2025: 4,383,528 ▲19.5%
- Rank: 74 out of 423
Services
Preceding station	New York City Subway	Following station
Chambers Street toward Van Cortlandt Park–242nd Street	1 (New York City Subway service)	Rector Street toward South Ferry
Location
Location within New York City Subway
Location within New York City
Location within New York
Track layout
Street map
Station service legend
Symbol	Description
Stops all times	Stops all times

The WTC Cortlandt station (Note: According to an internal MTA document, train conductors are explicitly told to abbreviate the World Trade Center's name as "WTC" when making announcements for the station.) (signed as World Trade Center on walls and historically known as Cortlandt Street and Cortlandt Street–World Trade Center) is a station on the IRT Broadway–Seventh Avenue Line of the New York City Subway in the Financial District of Manhattan. The station is located under the intersection of Greenwich Street and Cortlandt Way within the World Trade Center. It is served by the 1 train at all times.

The original Cortlandt Street station was built by the Interborough Rapid Transit Company (IRT) and opened in 1918 as part of the Dual Contracts. The station was renovated in the 1960s when the original World Trade Center was built. Around that time, the portion of Cortlandt Street above the station was demolished to make way for the World Trade Center. The Cortlandt Street station was destroyed in the September 11, 2001 attacks. Although service on the Broadway–Seventh Avenue Line through the area was restored in September 2002, the station's reconstruction was delayed until 2015 because the Port Authority of New York and New Jersey had to first rebuild the World Trade Center PATH station beneath it. After an extensive reconstruction, the Cortlandt Street station reopened on September 8, 2018, as WTC Cortlandt.

The station contains connections to PATH at the World Trade Center station, as well as an out-of-system passageway to the Chambers Street–World Trade Center/Park Place/Cortlandt Street and Fulton Street subway complexes via the World Trade Center Transportation Hub.

== History ==
=== Early history ===
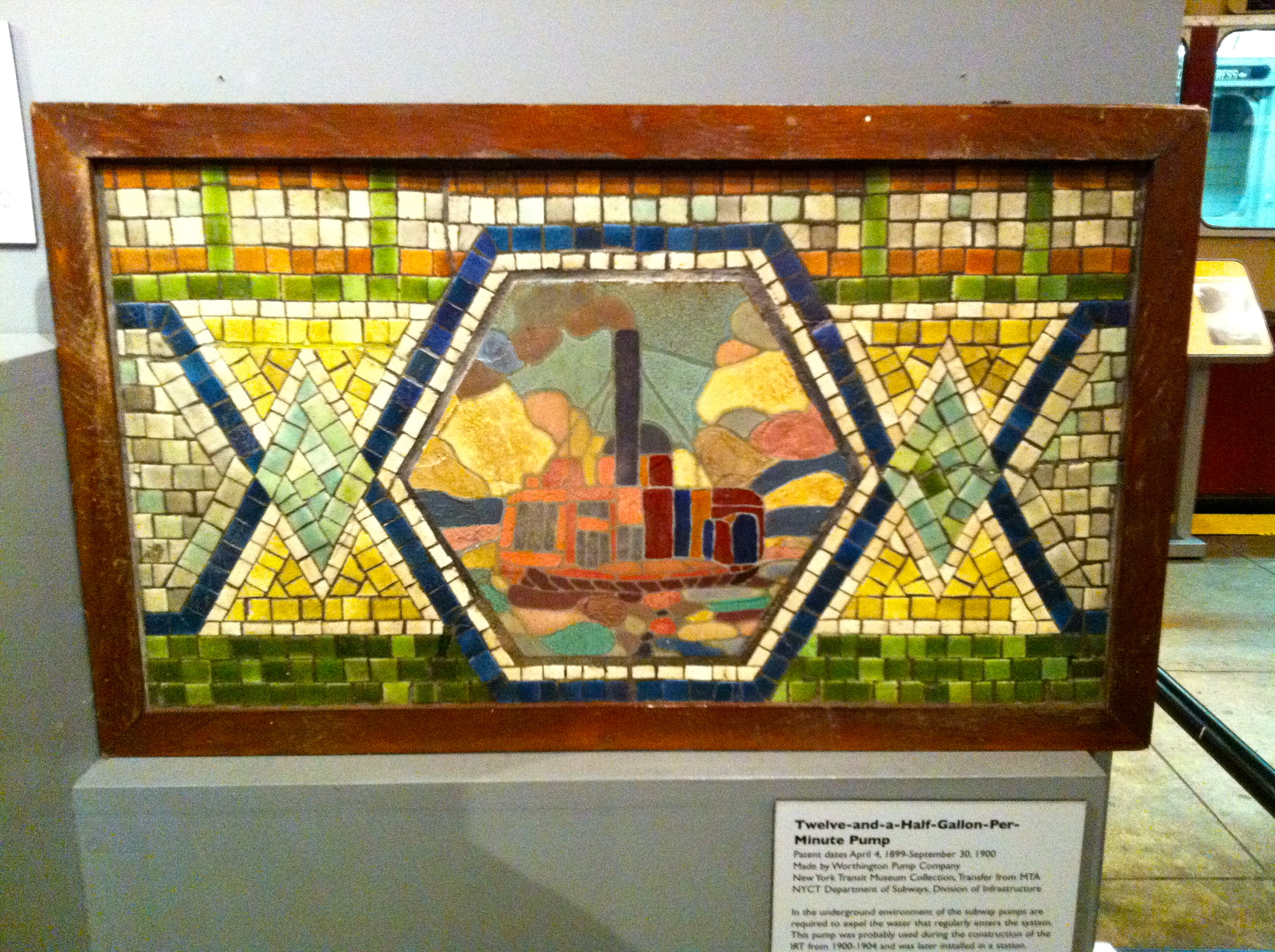
This mosaic was located in the station until it was removed in 1965 as part of a renovation. It is now located at the New York Transit Museum.

The Dual Contracts, which were signed on March 19, 1913, were contracts for the construction and/or rehabilitation and operation of rapid transit lines in the City of New York. The contracts were "dual" in that they were signed between the city and two separate private companies (the Interborough Rapid Transit Company and the Brooklyn Rapid Transit Company), all working together to make the construction of the Dual Contracts possible. The Dual Contracts promised the construction of several lines in Brooklyn. As part of Contract 3, the IRT agreed to build a branch of the original subway line south down Seventh Avenue, Varick Street, and West Broadway to serve the West Side of Manhattan.

The construction of this line, in conjunction with the construction of the Lexington Avenue Line, would change the operations of the IRT system. Instead of having trains go via Broadway, turning onto 42nd Street, before finally turning onto Park Avenue, there would be two trunk lines connected by the 42nd Street Shuttle. The system would be changed from looking like a "Z" system on a map to an "H" system. One trunk would run via the new Lexington Avenue Line down Park Avenue, and the other trunk would run via the new Seventh Avenue Line up Broadway. In order for the line to continue down Varick Street and West Broadway, these streets needed to be widened, and two new streets were built, the Seventh Avenue Extension and the Varick Street Extension. It was predicted that the subway extension would lead to the growth of the Lower West Side, and to neighborhoods such as Chelsea and Greenwich Village.

During construction of the station, under Dey Street, the hull of a colonial ship was uncovered. Cortlandt Street opened as part of an extension of the line from 34th Street–Penn Station to South Ferry on July 1, 1918. Initially, the station was served by a shuttle running from Times Square to South Ferry. The new "H" system was implemented on August 1, 1918, joining the two halves of the Broadway–Seventh Avenue Line and sending all West Side trains south from Times Square. An immediate result of the switch was the need to transfer using the 42nd Street Shuttle in order to retrace the original layout. The completion of the "H" system doubled the capacity of the IRT system. The station was built at the intersection of Cortlandt and Greenwich Streets, in a part of Lower Manhattan nicknamed "Radio Row" because of the many electronics dealers on the street. It had a standard two side platform layout with two tracks. There were mosaic decorations by Squire J. Vickers or Herbert Dole depicting ships along each platform's wall. Red I-beam columns ran along the entire length of both platforms at regular intervals.

=== 20th century ===
The city government took over the IRT's operations on June 12, 1940. On August 9, 1964, the New York City Transit Authority (NYCTA) announced the letting of a $7.6 million contract to lengthen platforms at stations from Rector Street to 34th Street–Penn Station on the line, including Cortlandt Street, and stations from Central Park North–110th Street to 145th Street on the Lenox Avenue Line to allow express trains to be lengthened from nine-car trains to ten-car trains, and to lengthen locals from eight-car trains to ten-car trains. With the completion of this project, the NYCTA project to lengthen IRT stations to accommodate ten-car trains would be complete. Work on the platform extension project took place in 1965 and 1966. During the project, old tiling and mosaics were removed and replaced with the 1970s-style varnished, tan-colored brick tiles. One of the mosaics was preserved in the New York Transit Museum.

In 1965, Cortlandt Street west of Church Street was demolished to create the superblock of the World Trade Center. The station, with entrances at Vesey Street and inside the World Trade Center concourse, was separated from the remaining block of Cortlandt Street. When the World Trade Center was finished, alternating columns on the platforms were retrofitted with black station name plates in white lettering; the name plates alternated between "Cortlandt Street" and "World Trade Center".

During the 1980s, when service levels across the subway system were decreased greatly from their heyday in the 1910s, the Metropolitan Transportation Authority installed the system's first train-frequency schedules at the Cortlandt Street station. Older timetables and maps elsewhere had been removed since they had become inaccurate.

Trains bypassed the station in the aftermath of the February 26, 1993, World Trade Center bombing. Soon after, 1 trains were back to Chambers Street. In 2001, just prior to the September 11 attacks, the Cortlandt Street station saw 19,446 riders per day.

=== September 11, 2001, attacks ===
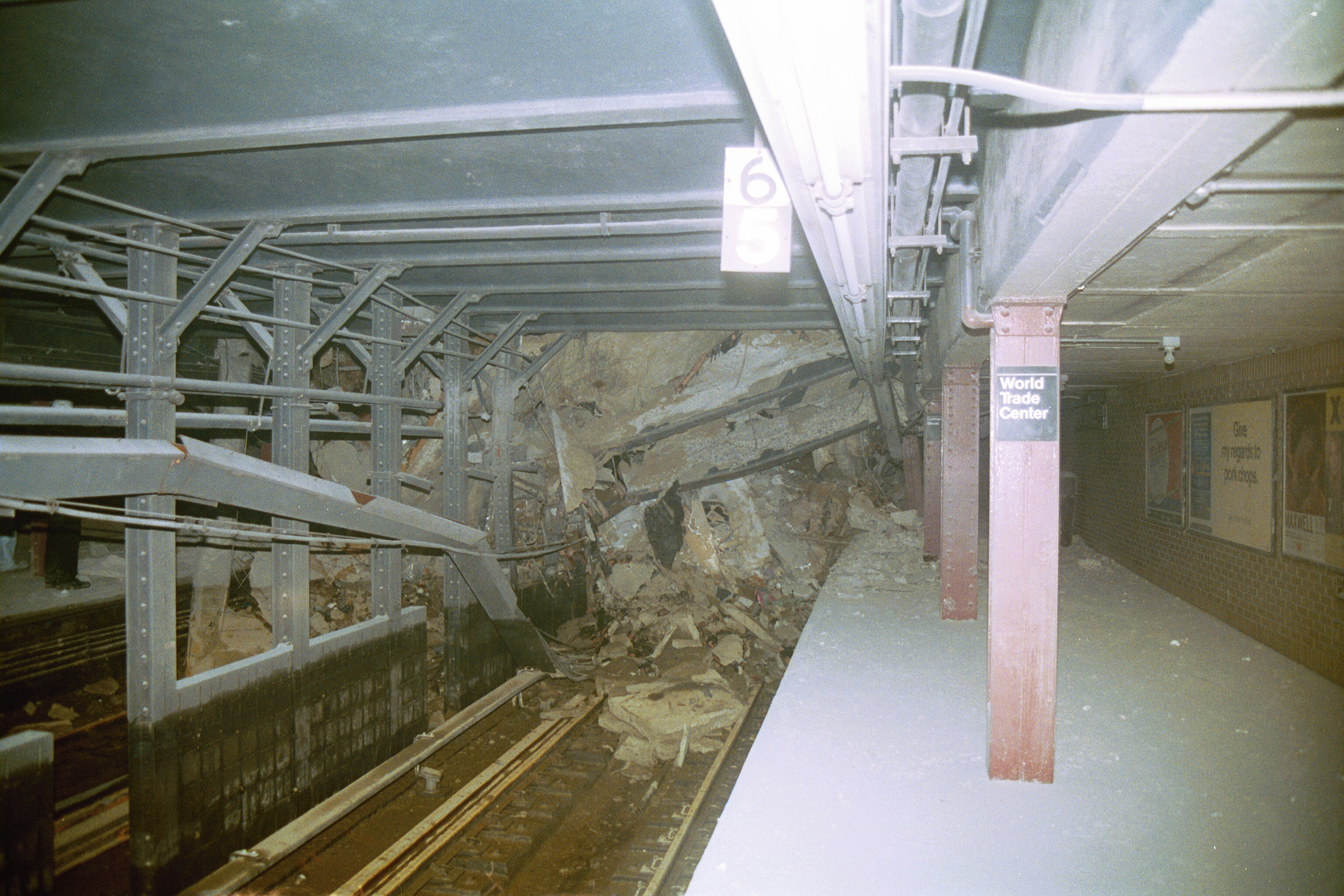
Station destruction caused by September 11, 2001, attacks

The station and the surrounding subway tunnels were severely damaged in the September 11, 2001, terrorist attacks following the collapse of Two World Trade Center, resulting in the closure of the line south of Chambers Street. During the September 11 attacks in 2001, a train operator reported an "explosion" to the MTA's Subway Control Center one minute after the first plane struck the World Trade Center's North Tower at 8:46 a.m. Subway service was halted shortly afterward and, as a result, no one in the subway system died. The tunnel had been located 40 feet (12 m) underground; the original tunnel had measured 30 feet (9.1 m) wide and 18 feet (5.5 m) high, with columns between the two tracks spaced at intervals of 5 feet (1.5 m). Being so close to ground level, the station partially collapsed under the weight of the falling debris, which crumpled the steel I-beams of the station.

Soon after the attacks, two options were considered: either the existing line would be repaired, or the tunnel would be diverted westward just to the north of the World Trade Center site before heading to a new terminal at South Ferry. The first option was chosen, and to quickly restore service to Rector Street and South Ferry stations to the south, workers demolished the remainder of the station and built walls where the platforms used to be. 975 feet (297 m) of tunnels and trackage, including 575 feet (175 m) of totally destroyed tunnels and tracks in the vicinity of the station site as it traversed Ground Zero, were entirely rebuilt. However, officials wanted only to reopen Rector and South Ferry stations at the time, and the Cortlandt Street station was to be closed completely, with no replacement.

Eventually, it was decided that the Cortlandt Street station was to be rebuilt as part of the greater World Trade Center reconstruction project; since the station was such a vital one in the area, a permanent closure was infeasible. As part of the project, the East Bathtub was extended under the line to the eastern boundary of the site at Church Street. George Pataki, who was the governor of New York at the time, stated, "This is going to help more than a million people by restoring service, help the recovery of lower Manhattan and sends a powerful message that New York City can't be stopped." The Port Authority's chief engineer and others tried to convince him to temporarily shut down the line while the new transportation hub at the World Trade Center was under construction. The Governor's decision to keep the line open increased the cost of the project because the subway structure had to be underpinned. The new tunnel measured 100 feet (30 m) wide to accommodate the future reconstruction of the Cortlandt Street station; it was otherwise designed to the same specifications as the original tunnel, with columns placed every 5 feet (1.5 m). The line reopened on September 15, 2002, with trains bypassing the site of the Cortlandt Street station.

The northern entrance at Vesey Street was under a staircase to the plaza above. After the attacks, the staircase still stood and became known as the Survivors' Staircase. The stairs were moved into the National September 11 Museum in July 2008.

=== Reconstruction and delays ===
==== PANYNJ cleanup ====
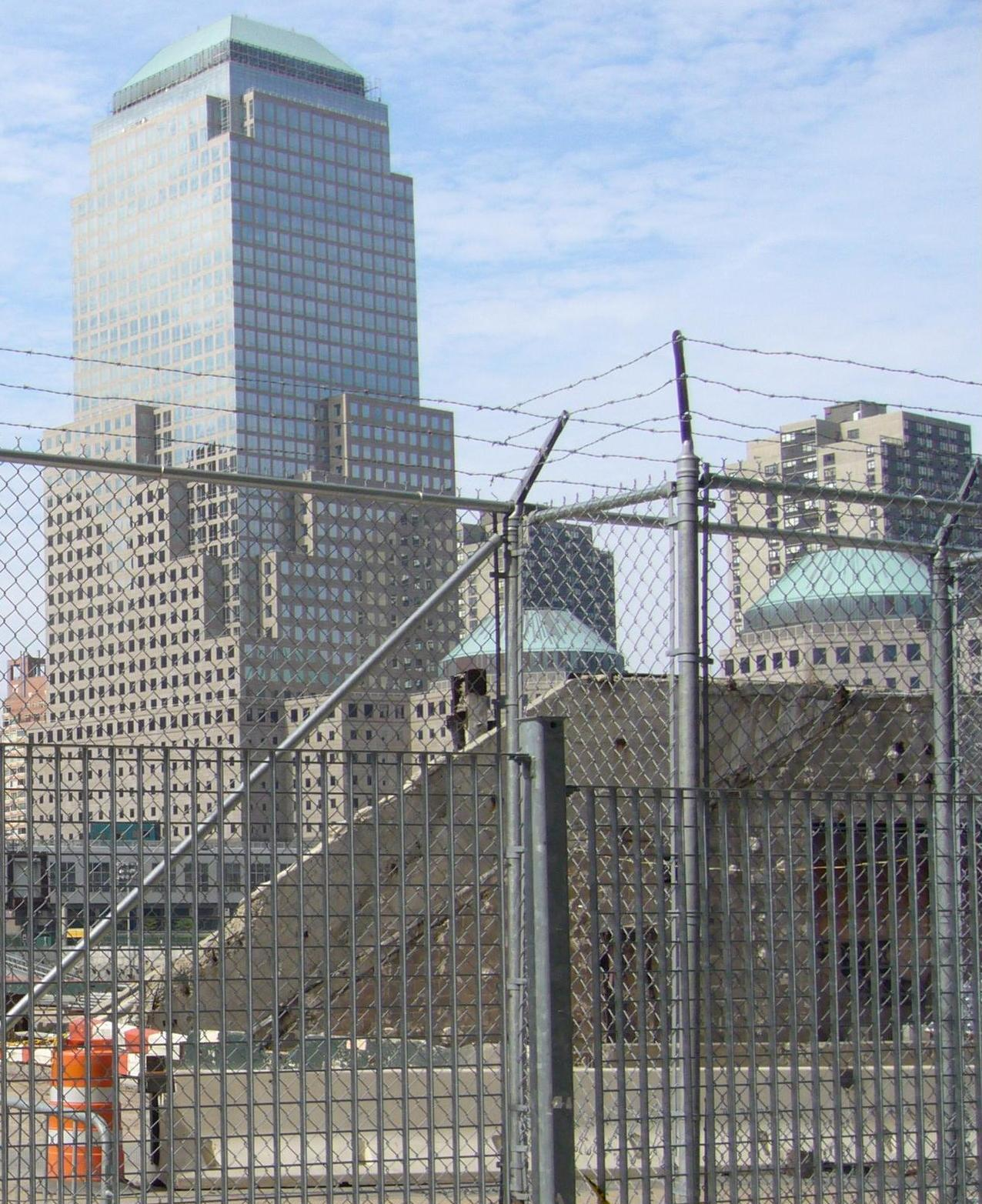
The ruins of the former Vesey Street entrance (lower right) in 2006

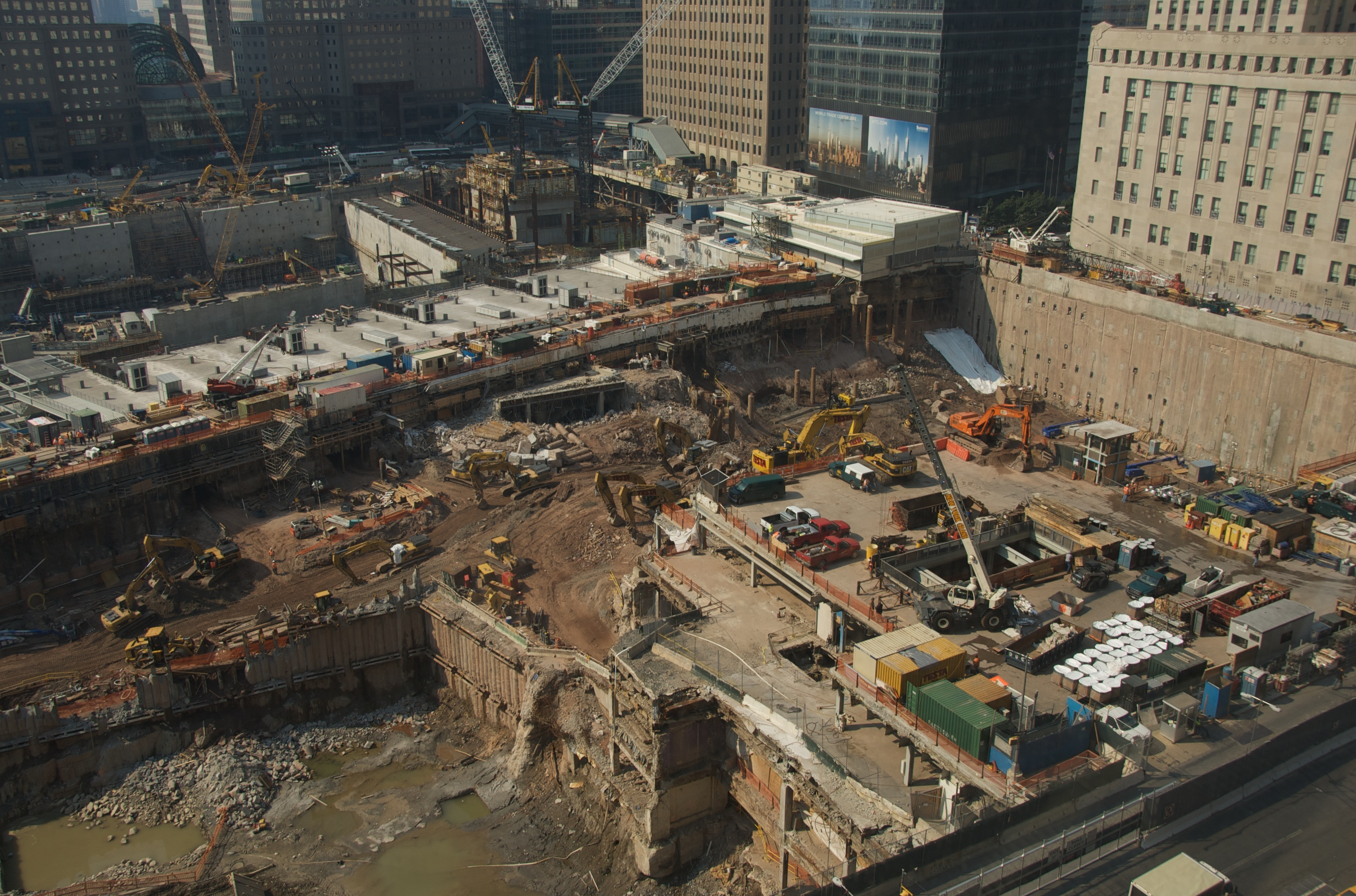
The WTC site in 2008. The concrete structure at top is a subway tunnel that includes the former location of the original station

In 2007, the Port Authority of New York and New Jersey (PANYNJ), in the Environmental Impact Statement for the World Trade Center PATH terminal, expected the Cortlandt Street station to reopen in 2009. In October 2008, the PANYNJ stated in a report that it had come to an agreement with the MTA on reconstructing the Cortlandt Street station. The MTA would pay the Port Authority to rebuild the station as part of the Port Authority's World Trade Center Transportation Hub contract, in order to make the construction process more efficient. The Port Authority was set to complete underpinning and excavation under the tunnel structure by the second quarter of 2010, and start basic construction of the Cortlandt Street station during the 3rd quarter. In the second quarter report for 2010, the Port Authority of New York and New Jersey confirmed that excavation under the tunnel structure of the World Trade Center site was nearly complete, and that construction of the Cortlandt Street station would begin during the third quarter of 2010. Station finishes were set to start during the second quarter of 2011, and work began on the station mezzanine and platforms in September 2011.

The tracks were walled off for the protection of the workers while the construction progressed. From 2008 to 2011, the 1 train used an enclosed structure for a short distance when passing the site of the station, as a result of the massive excavation in the World Trade Center site. When the site was filled back in, the developers of the new World Trade Center rebuilt Cortlandt Street across the site as one of the primary roads, resulting in the rebuilt Cortlandt Street station again serving its namesake.

Disputes between the PANYNJ and the MTA over who would pay for the renovation had caused the planned opening of the station to be delayed from 2014 to 2018. In 2013, the PANYNJ awarded a contract to rebuild the station. The first phase of the demolition of the original station cost $19 million. The area was still being rebuilt in December 2013, and in February 2015, the PANYNJ and the MTA agreed to finish the station. The part of the Broadway–Seventh Avenue Line on which the Cortlandt Street station is located, south of Chambers Street, was intermittently closed between May 2015 and 2018. This allowed construction at the station, which included station finishes, tiles and lighting, to resume.

==== MTA rebuild ====
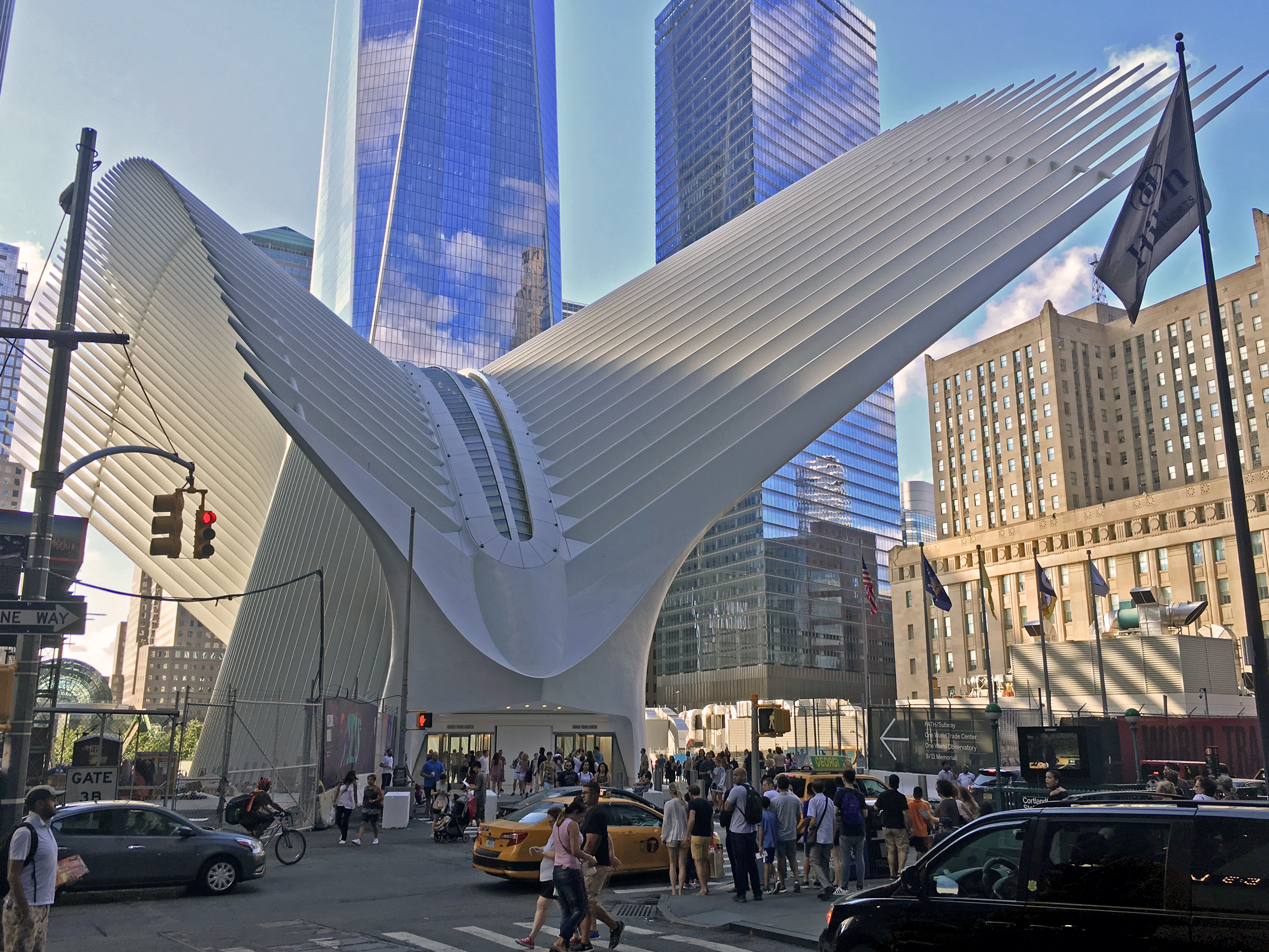
The WTC Transportation Hub Oculus building

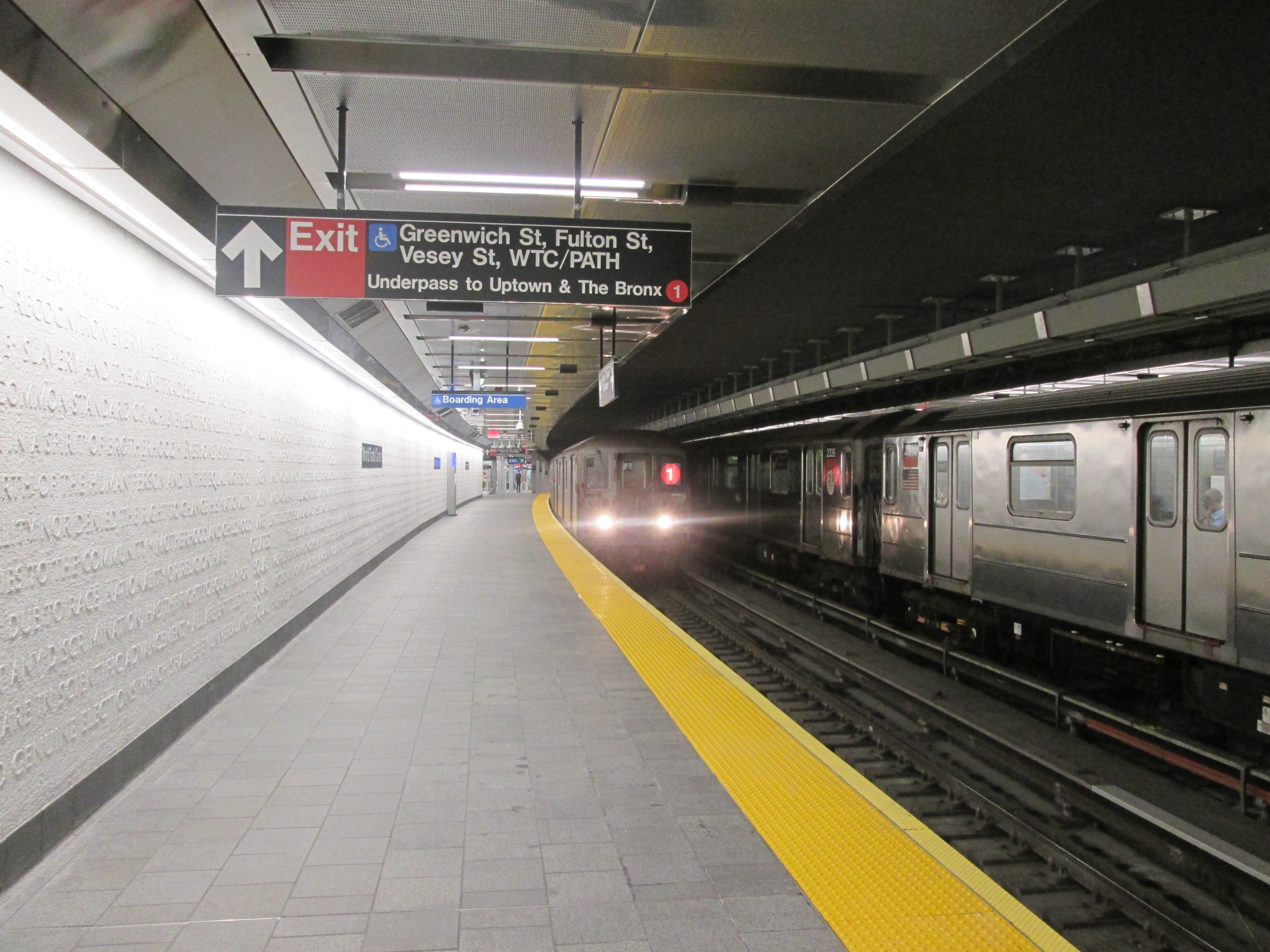
Two R62A 1 trains at the station, as seen from the southbound platform

The MTA gained control of the Cortlandt Street station's reconstruction project in 2015. However, in January 2017, an independent engineer for the MTA said that the station's reopening could potentially be pushed back due to disagreements with station contractor Judlau Contracting. At that time, the MTA had spent $800,000 per month on the project, but it would need to spend four times as much money in order to meet the projected August 2018 deadline. The PANYNJ agreed to grant the MTA "full access" to the Cortlandt Street station in June 2017 once the temporary World Trade Center PATH entrance was demolished and the station's foundation was poured. The renovation included new Americans with Disabilities Act-compliant entrances with elevators, track-intrusion systems, fire alarms, Help Points, CCTV cameras, countdown clocks and air conditioning. A $1 million text-based marble mural by Ann Hamilton was installed in the station.

By September 2017, much of the communications, power, and ventilation infrastructure was being installed, but contractor work and Port Authority utility relocation were significantly delayed. According to the MTA's Capital Program Oversight Committee, the contractor had to more than double its productivity to ensure an October 2018 opening, with substantial completion in December 2018. In April 2018, several news sources affirmed the possible reopening date of October 2018. By June, the station wiring was complete, architectural finishes and turnstiles were being installed, and elevators and escalators were being installed. Station name signs with the text "World Trade Center" were being installed along the platform walls by August 2018. The reconstruction of the station ultimately cost $181 million, up from earlier projections of $158 million and $101 million. At that point, the television station WCBS-TV estimated that over a million trains had passed through the station without stopping.

On September 7, 2018, several news sources reported that the station would reopen the next day in time for the seventeenth anniversary of the attacks. The following day, the station reopened with a ceremony. A new name, "WTC Cortlandt", was chosen for the station because of its location under the World Trade Center, in addition to paying homage to its historic name of Cortlandt Street. However, work on the station had yet to be complete. As of September 2018, the MTA still had to complete the art on the northbound platform's wall, replace temporary ceilings, floodproof the station, and complete the north end of the station. The MTA projected that the work would be substantially complete by the end of December 2018. As late as 2019, the station's reconstruction was 95% complete.

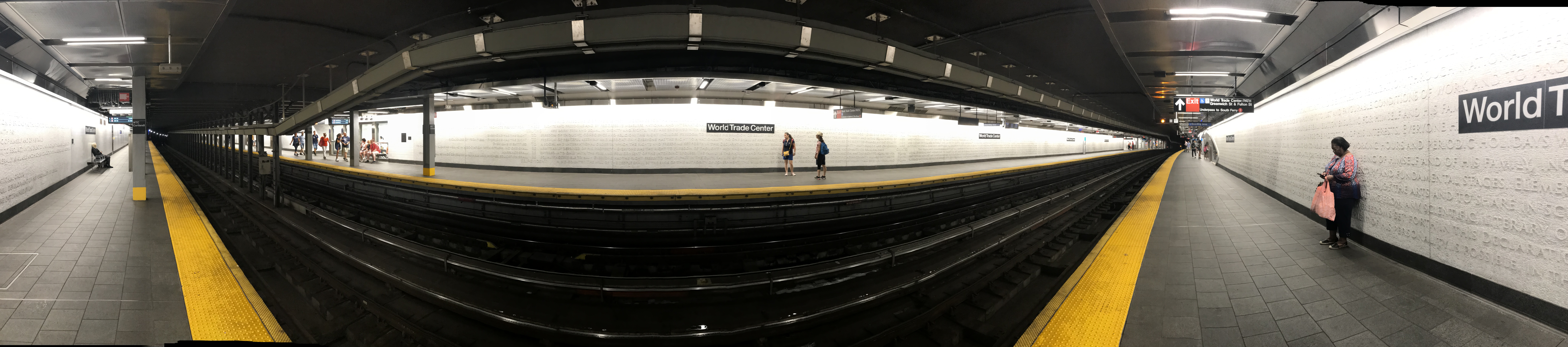
Panoramic view of the rebuilt station

== Station layout ==
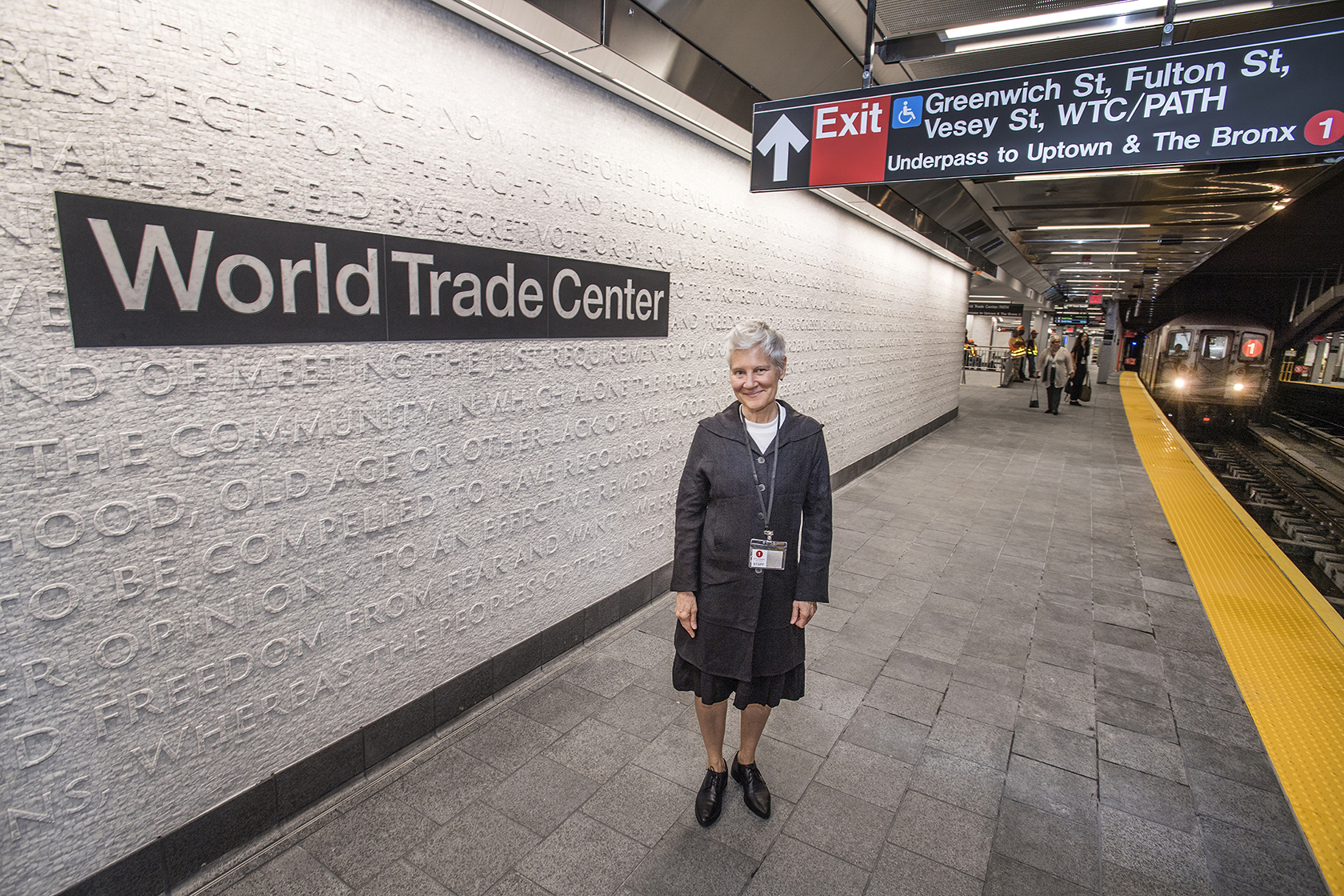
View of the artwork CHORUS

The rebuilt station is located under Greenwich Street, at the same location as the original station. The 1 train stops here at all times. The station is between Chambers Street to the north and Rector Street to the south.

It retains the two-track, two-side-platform layout, and is 20 feet (6.1 m) below the ground level. There are columns between the tracks, except where the station passes over the World Trade Center Transportation Hub toward its north end. There is also a crossunder between the two platforms at the north end of the station, north of the hub. The platforms feature gray I-beam columns with signs reading "WTC Cortlandt" on every other column. "World Trade Center" name signs are installed on the station's walls. The station also contains an air-conditioning system.

The 2018 artwork in this station is CHORUS, a $1 million, 4,350-square-foot (404 m^{2}) weaving-based artwork by Ann Hamilton. This artwork features words from several documents, including from the United Nations Declaration of Human Rights and United States Declaration of Independence, embossed onto the station walls.

- Note: The following diagram depicts multiple lines; transfer to or from the WTC Cortlandt station (i.e., 1 service) requires payment of an additional fare.

Fulton St to Cortlandt St subway cross-section
Greenwich St	WTC Transportation; Hub (Oculus) / Westfield Shops	Church St		Broadway	Fulton; Center / Westfield; Shops		Nassau St		William St
1	WTC Transportation; Hub (Oculus) / Westfield Shops	R / W		4 / 5	Fulton; Center / Westfield; Shops		J / Z south		mezzanine
underpass	WTC Transportation; Hub (Oculus) / Westfield Shops	underpass	Dey Street Passageway	underpass	Fulton; Center / Westfield; Shops	mezzanine	J / Z north	mezzanine	2 / 3
mezzanine	WTC Transportation; Hub (Oculus) / Westfield Shops				← A / C →
PATH

=== Exits ===
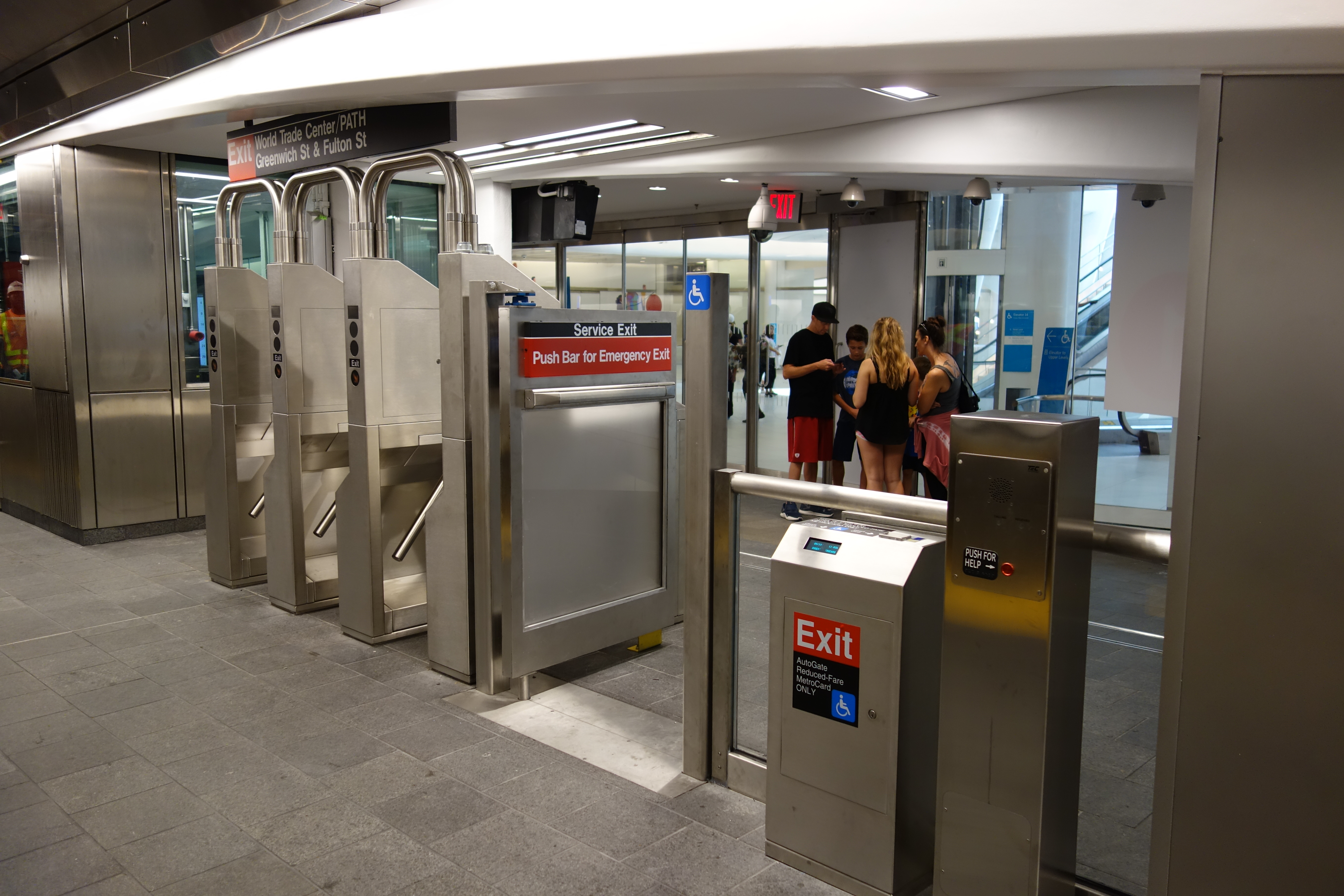
View of the main fare control area to the WTC Hub

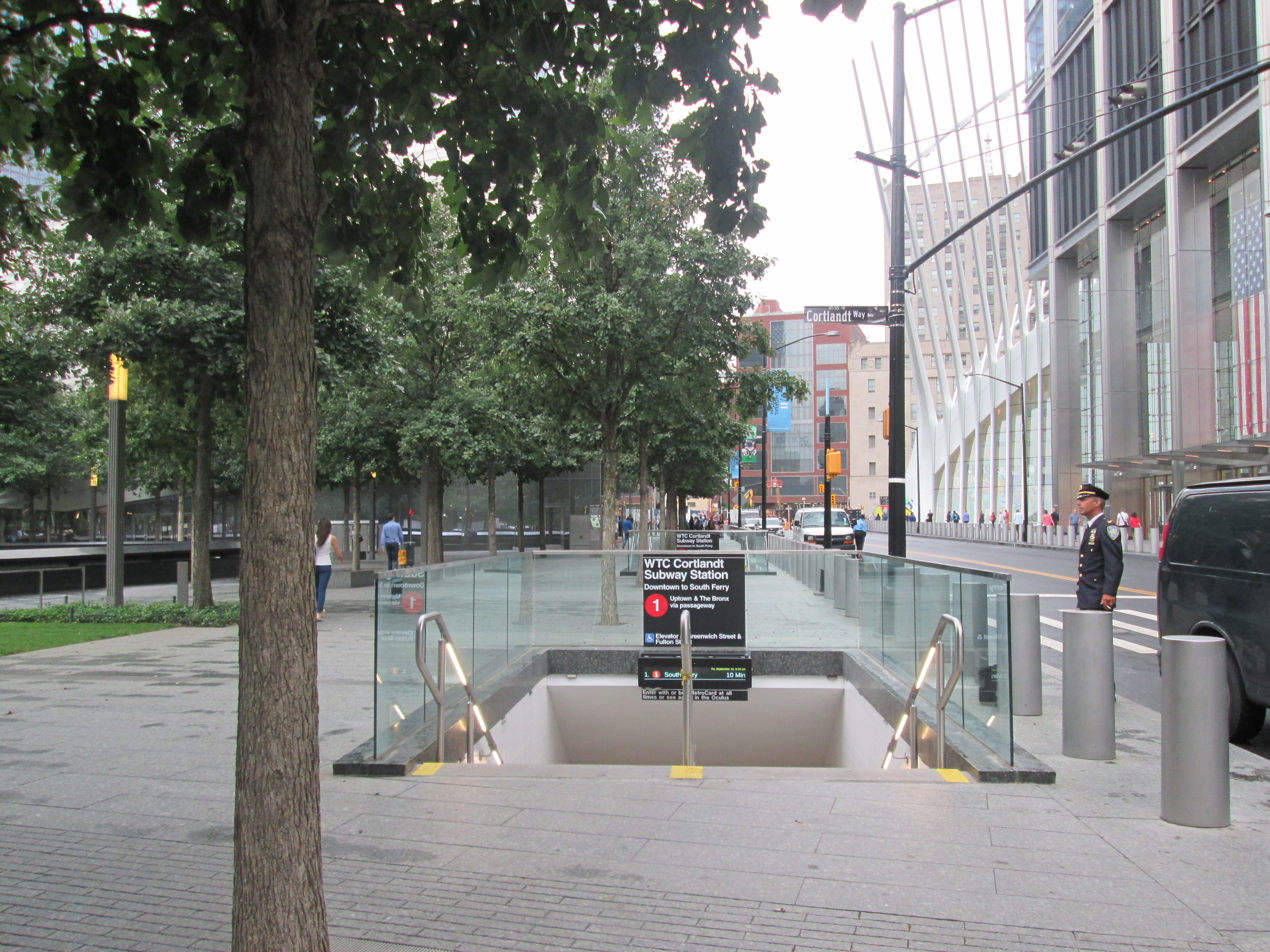
Entrance to the station from street level

The rebuilt station is connected to the Chambers Street–World Trade Center/Park Place/Cortlandt Street and World Trade Center PATH stations within the World Trade Center Transportation Hub. The WTC Cortlandt station is located just west to the World Trade Center Hub's head house, which is known as the "Oculus". There are a total of four entrances from the World Trade Center Transportation Hub. Two mezzanines underneath the tracks, at the north and south ends of the station, give direct access from the subway to the PATH. The northern mezzanine contains access to both platforms, while the southern mezzanine only connects to the southbound platform. There are additional entrances to the uptown platform from the Oculus building's upper balcony, as well as from the South Concourse, which connects to the basement of 3 World Trade Center. There is an out-of-system connection to the Fulton Center via the WTC Hub.

The southbound platform has two direct exits to the street. The first is an elevator and stair at Vesey Street at the platform's extreme north end, and the second is a pair of staircases to Cortlandt Way at the station's extreme south end. The station is ADA-accessible via the elevator at Vesey Street, as well as existing elevators to the World Trade Center Transportation Hub. Additional elevators lead from each platform to the crossunder beneath the station.

Prior to 9/11, the station's full-time entrance was located at the north end of the station at Vesey Street and West Broadway, where there was a turnstile bank and one full height turnstile. The token booth at this exit was still intact until the last remnants of the station were removed in 2007. The entrance to the World Trade Center Concourse consisted of full height turnstiles at the center of each platform and was only open on weekdays between 6:40 a.m. and 10 p.m. (Note: The hours can be seen in the following video at the 0:52 mark on the door.) At the station's southern end, there was an exit to Liberty Street through Four World Trade Center.
