= Rector Street station (IRT Broadway–Seventh Avenue Line) =

New York City Subway station in Manhattan

Rector Street
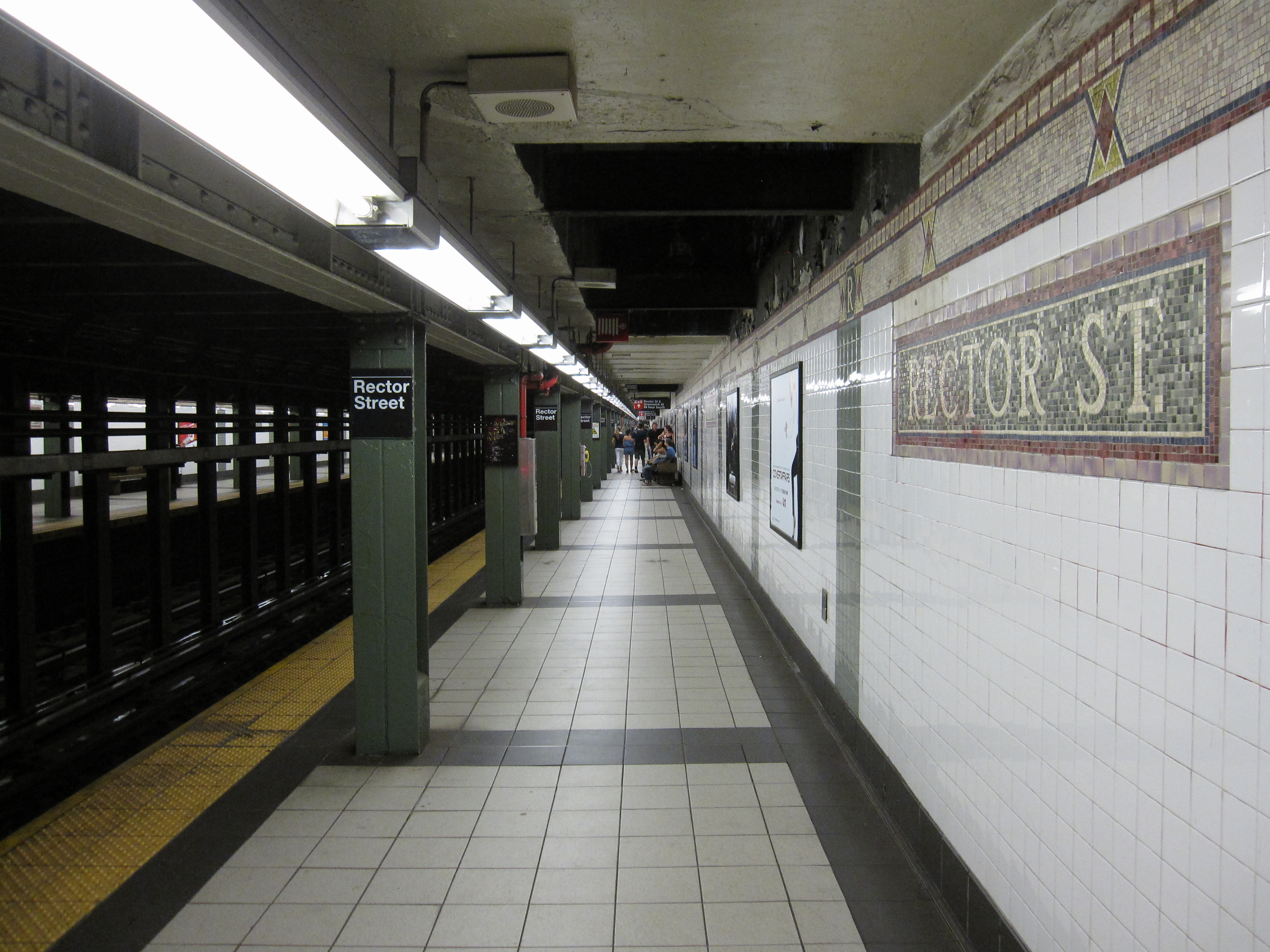
- Uptown platform

Station statistics
- Address: Rector Street & Greenwich Street; New York, New York
- Borough: Manhattan
- Locale: Financial District
- Coordinates: 40.708°N 74.013°W
- Division: A (IRT)
- Line: IRT Broadway–Seventh Avenue Line
- Services: 1 (all times)
- Transit: NYCT Bus: M55, X27, X28; MTA Bus: BM1, BM2, BM3, BM4
- Structure: Underground
- Platforms: 2 side platforms
- Tracks: 2

Other information
- Opened: July 1, 1918; 108 years ago
- Closed: September 11, 2001; 25 years ago
- Rebuilt: September 15, 2002; 24 years ago

Traffic
- 2025: 1,816,840 ▲9.2%
- Rank: 196 out of 423
Services
Preceding station	New York City Subway	Following station
WTC Cortlandt toward Van Cortlandt Park–242nd Street	1 (New York City Subway service)	South Ferry Terminus
Non-revenue services and lines
Preceding station	New York City Subway	Following station
	no service	South Ferry loops; closed
Location
Location within New York City Subway
Location within New York City
Location within New York
Track layout
Street map
Station service legend
Symbol	Description
Stops all times	Stops all times
Stops weekends during the day	Stops weekends during the day

The Rector Street station is a station on the IRT Broadway–Seventh Avenue Line of the New York City Subway. Located at the intersection of Rector Street and Greenwich Street in the Financial District of Manhattan, it is served by the 1 train at all times.

The station was built by the Interborough Rapid Transit Company (IRT) as part of the Dual Contracts with New York City, and opened on July 1, 1918. The station's platforms were lengthened in the 1960s, and the station was renovated after being out of service for a year in the aftermath of the September 11, 2001 attacks.

== History ==
=== Early history ===
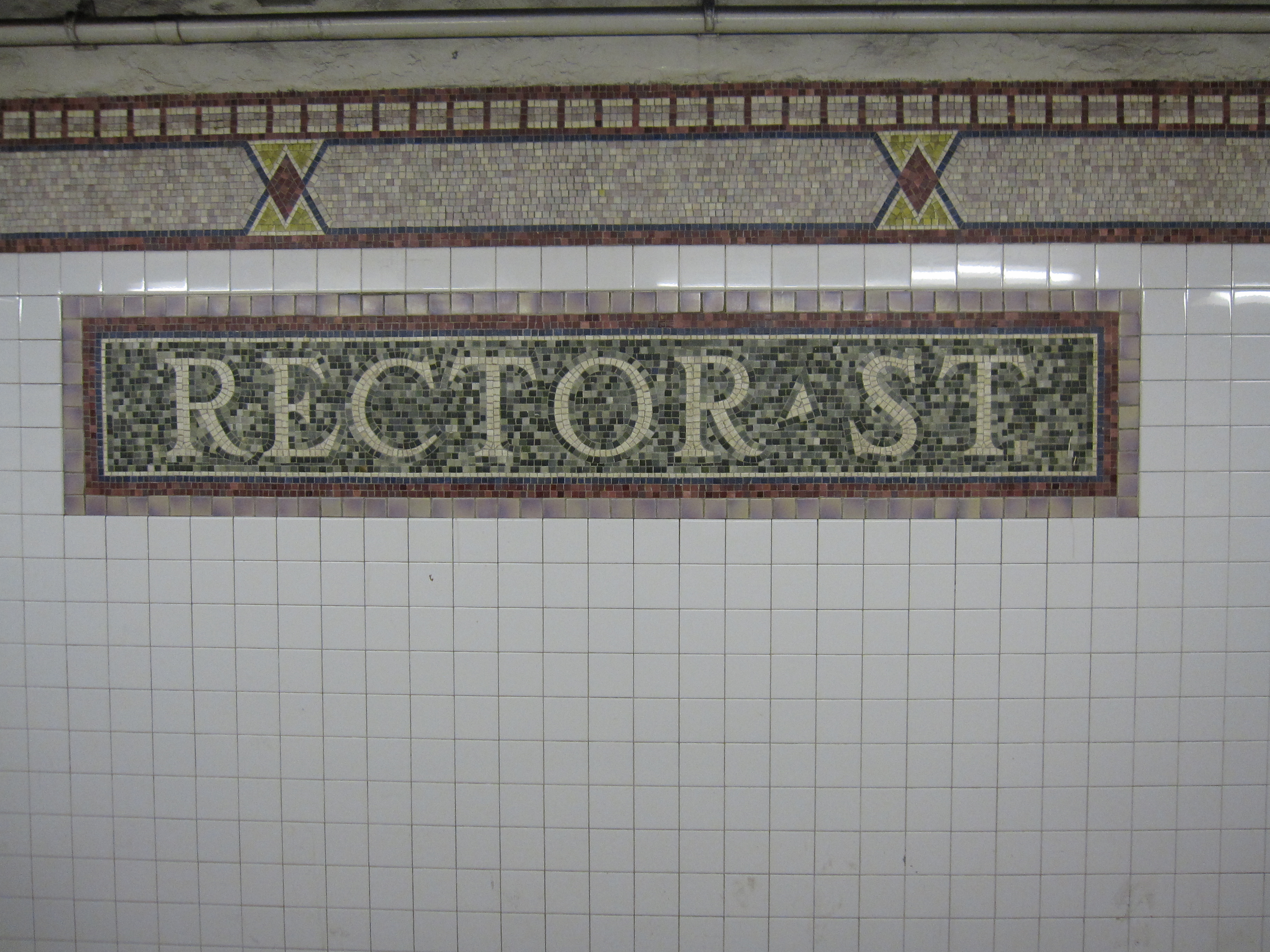
Mosaic name of the station

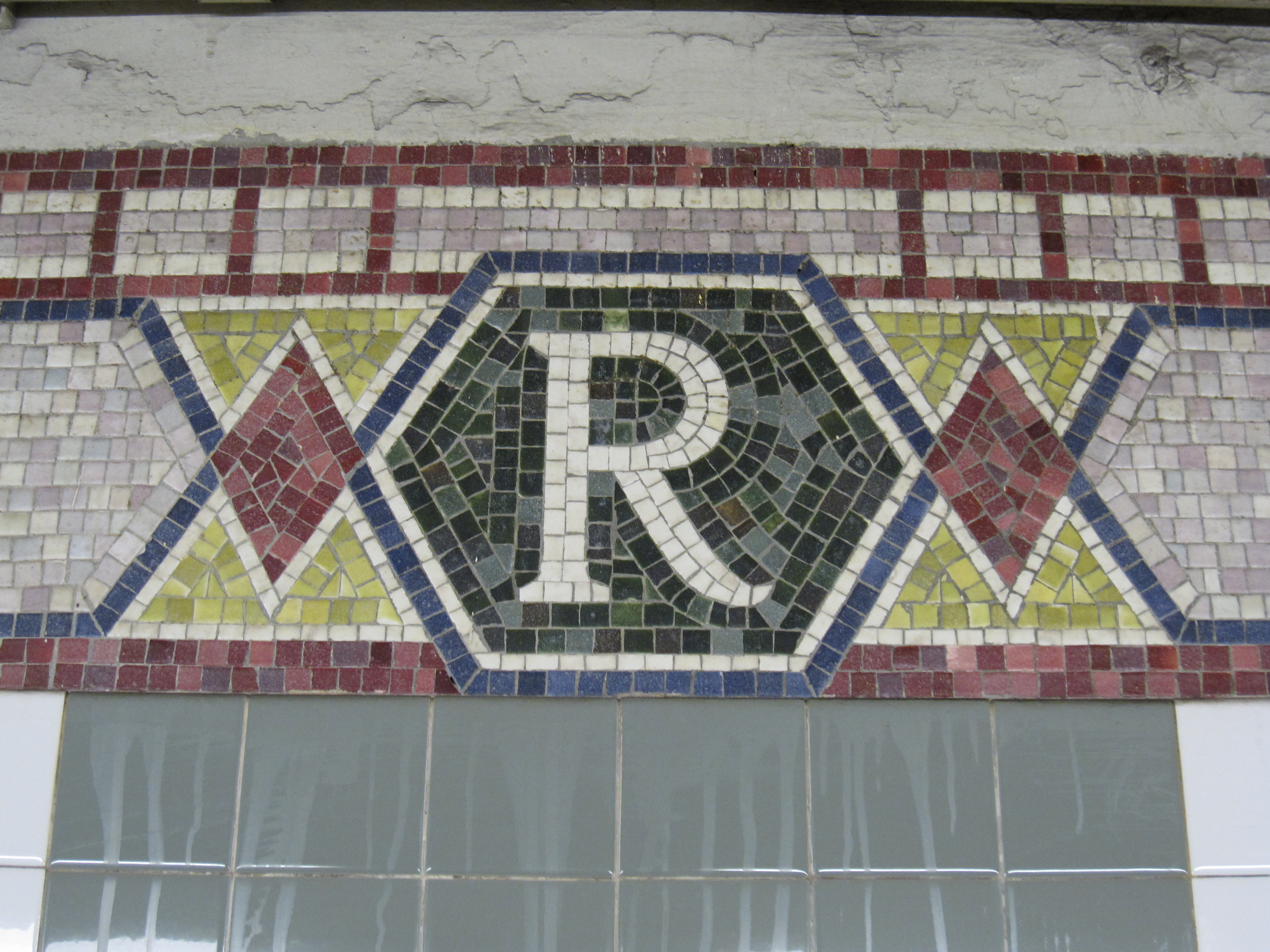
Close-up of one of the wall mosaics with the letter "R"

The Dual Contracts, which were signed on March 19, 1913, were contracts for the construction and/or rehabilitation and operation of rapid transit lines in the City of New York. The contracts were "dual" in that they were signed between the City and two separate private companies (the Interborough Rapid Transit Company and the Brooklyn Rapid Transit Company), all working together to make the construction of the Dual Contracts possible. The Dual Contracts promised the construction of several lines in Brooklyn. As part of Contract 4, the IRT agreed to build a branch of the original subway line south down Seventh Avenue, Varick Street, and West Broadway to serve the West Side of Manhattan.

The construction of this line, in conjunction with the construction of the Lexington Avenue Line, would change the operations of the IRT system. Instead of having trains go via Broadway, turning onto 42nd Street, before finally turning onto Park Avenue, there would be two trunk lines connected by the 42nd Street Shuttle. The system would be changed from looking like a "Z" system on a map to an "H" system. One trunk would run via the new Lexington Avenue Line down Park Avenue, and the other trunk would run via the new Seventh Avenue Line up Broadway. In order for the line to continue down Varick Street and West Broadway, these streets needed to be widened, and two new streets were built, the Seventh Avenue Extension and the Varick Street Extension. It was predicted that the subway extension would lead to the growth of the Lower West Side, and to neighborhoods such as Chelsea and Greenwich Village.

Rector Street opened as part of an extension of the line from 34th Street–Penn Station to South Ferry on July 1, 1918. Initially, the station was served by a shuttle running from Times Square to South Ferry. The new "H" system was implemented on August 1, 1918, joining the two halves of the Broadway–Seventh Avenue Line and sending all West Side trains south from Times Square. An immediate result of the switch was the need to transfer using the 42nd Street Shuttle in order to retrace the original layout. The completion of the "H" system doubled the capacity of the IRT system.

=== Later years ===
The city government took over the IRT's operations on June 12, 1940. On August 9, 1964, the New York City Transit Authority (NYCTA) announced the letting of a $7.6 million contract to lengthen platforms at stations from Rector Street to 34th Street–Penn Station on the line, and stations from Central Park North–110th Street to 145th Street on the Lenox Avenue Line to allow express trains to be lengthened from nine-car trains to ten-car trains, and to lengthen locals from eight-car trains to ten-car trains. With the completion of this project, the NYCTA project to lengthen IRT stations to accommodate ten-car trains would be complete.

After the September 11, 2001 attacks, the subway tunnels around Cortlandt Street collapsed, and the line was closed temporarily. About 1,000 feet (300 m) of tunnels and trackage, including 575 feet (175 m) of totally destroyed tunnels and tracks in the vicinity of the World Trade Center site, were entirely rebuilt. The station reopened on September 15, 2002. During the intervening period, with service suspended indefinitely, the station underwent a $14 million renovation.

Due to water damage to South Ferry caused by Hurricane Sandy, all 1 trains terminated at this station from October 2012 until April 4, 2013, when the former South Ferry Loop terminal station reopened.

== Station layout ==
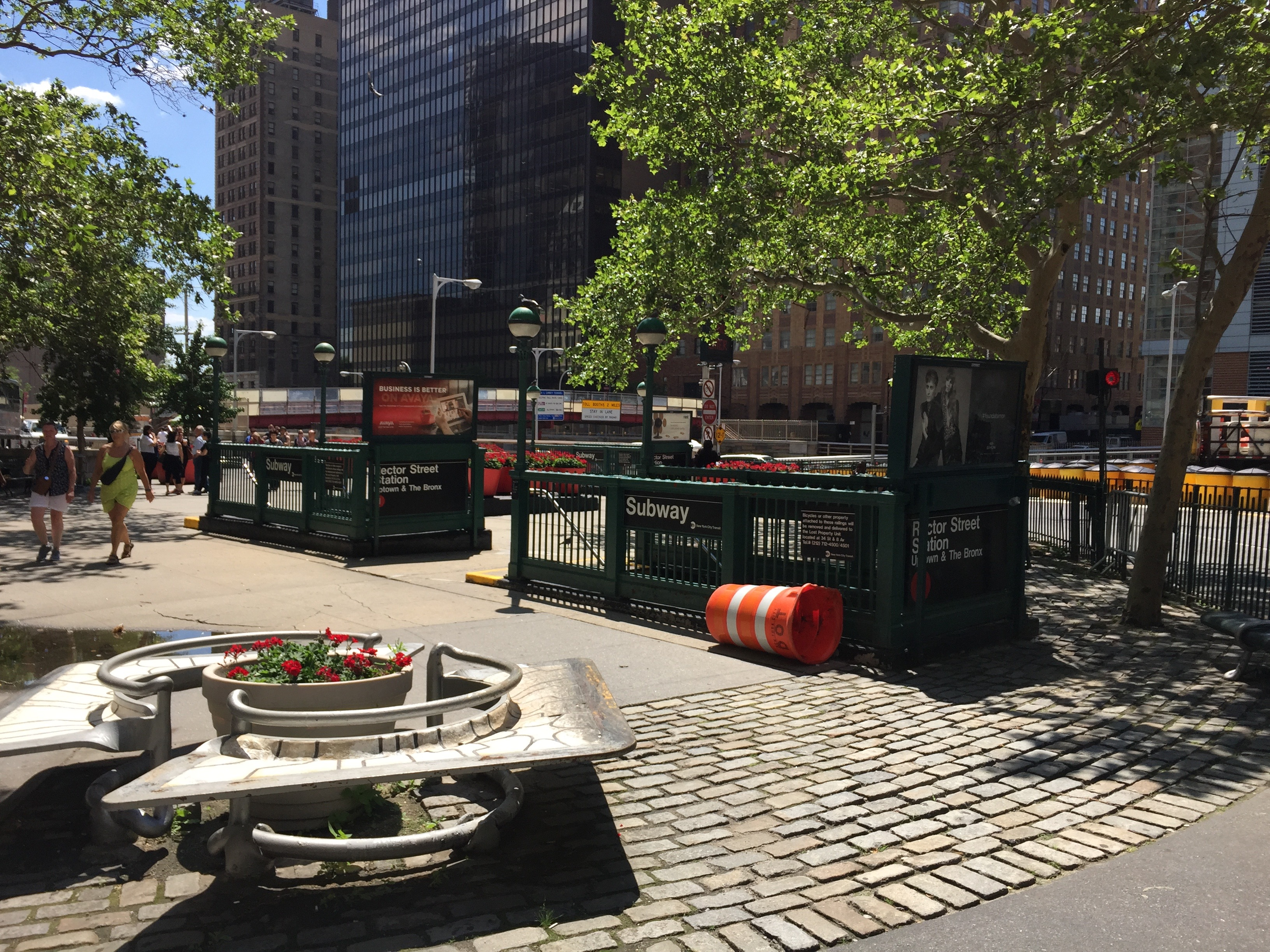
Northbound entrance at Edgar Street

This underground station has two tracks and two side platforms. The 1 train stops here at all times. The station is between WTC Cortlandt to the north and South Ferry to the south.

Each platform has mosaic trim line and name tablets of mostly green and brown. The tiles are painted light green below the "R" tablets.

=== Exits ===
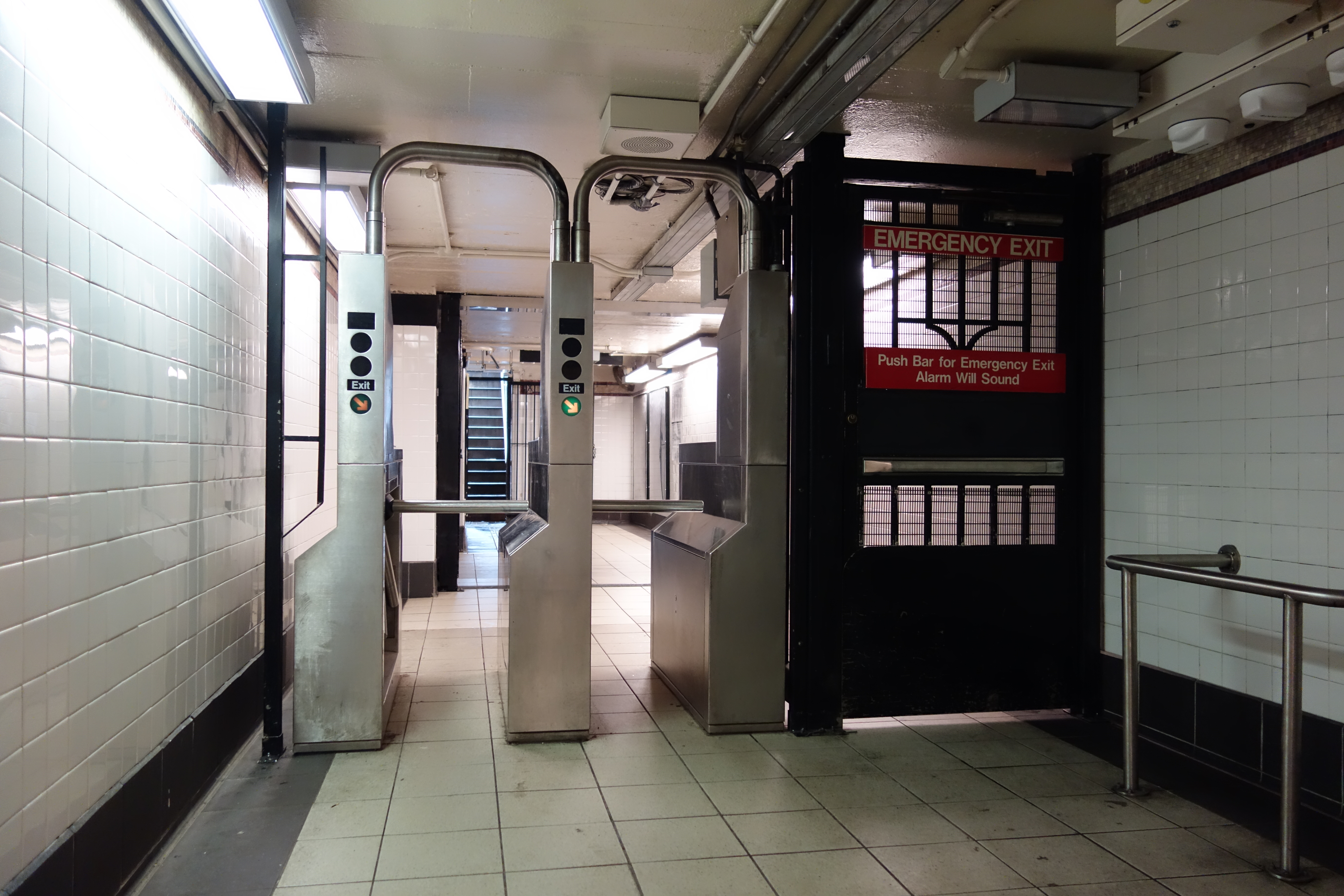
Fare control from downtown platform to Elizabeth Berger Plaza

This station has five fare control areas at three locations. There is no crossover between the uptown and downtown sides. On the northern end of the downtown platform, there are two High Entry/Exit Turnstiles leading to one street stair that goes up to the northwest corner of Rector and Greenwich Streets coming from two high entrance turnstiles directly on the platform. On the northern end of the uptown platform, a single staircase leads to the tiny, full-time mezzanine. It has a turnstile bank, token booth, and one street stair that leads to the north corner of Rector and Greenwich Streets. The north end of the uptown platform had an exit to the basement of 88 Greenwich Street, which opened in 1931. The exit to 88 Greenwich Street had closed by 1941.

In the middle of the downtown platform, two staircases lead up to a tiny intermediate level where a single exit-only turnstile leads to a staircase that goes up midblock on Greenwich Street between Rector and Edgar Streets.

The south end of the downtown platform has HEET turnstiles leading to a single staircase that goes up to Elizabeth H. Berger Plaza, just south of Edgar Street where Greenwich Street ends at the foot of the Brooklyn–Battery Tunnel. Directly across the street from this area, there are two street stairs that lead down to two HEET turnstiles on the uptown platform. These entrances are located directly across from another entrance to the separate Rector Street station on the BMT Broadway Line.
