= Elizabeth H. Berger Plaza =

Plaza in Manhattan, New York

Coordinates: 40.7069°N 74.0139°W

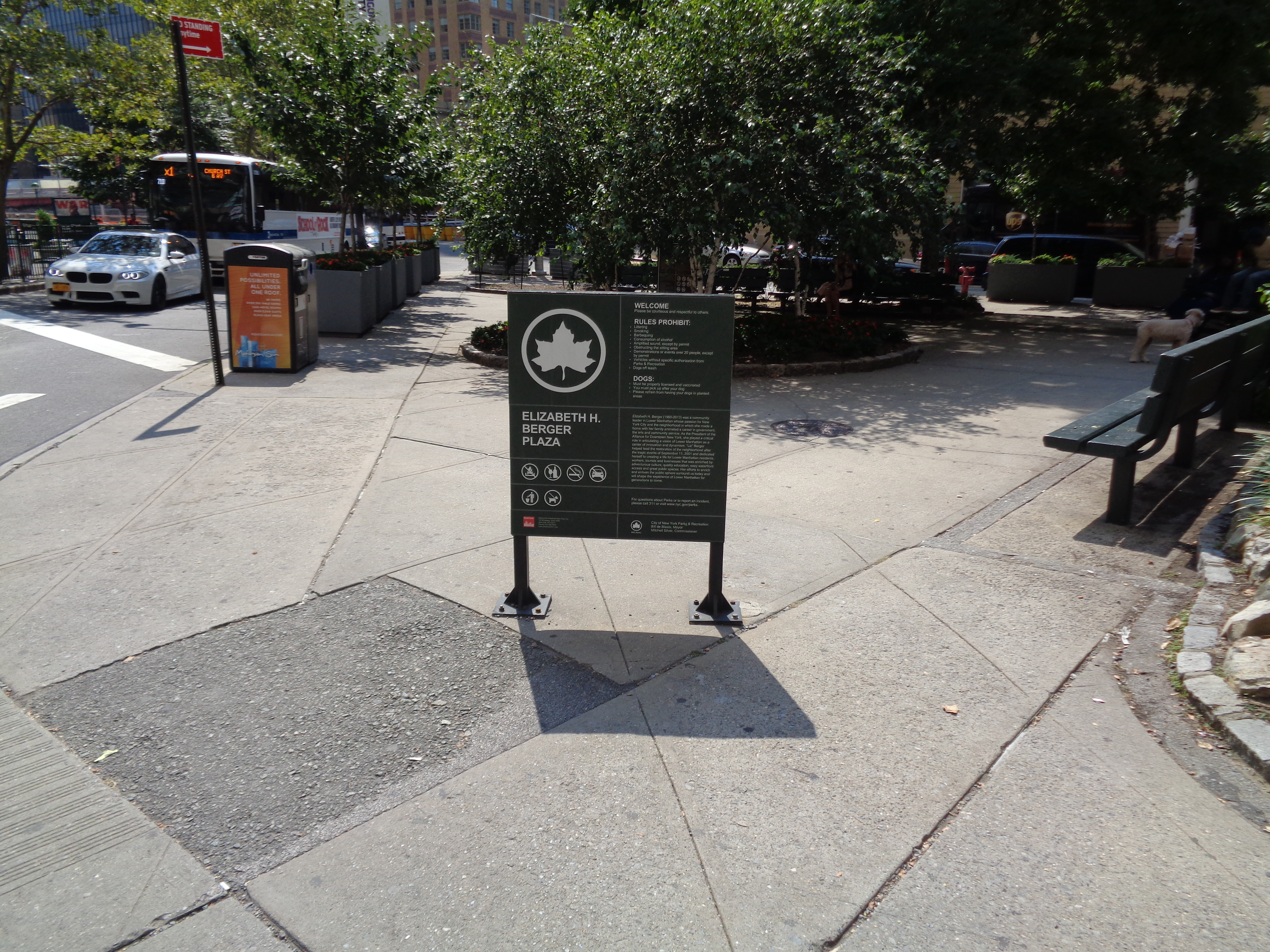
Elizabeth H. Berger Plaza

Elizabeth H. Berger Plaza is a public park in the Financial District of Manhattan, New York City. Formed by the triangular junction of Trinity Place, Greenwich Street, and Edgar Street. It faces the Manhattan exit ramp from the Brooklyn–Battery Tunnel. Formerly known as the Edgar Street Greenstreet, this park honors civic advocate Elizabeth H. Berger (1960–2013). In her role as president of the Downtown Alliance, she advocated for the fusion of two traffic triangles at this location into an expanded park. The park is located on the site of a former neighborhood known as Little Syria, a bustling immigrant community displaced by the construction of the tunnel in 1953.

== Shoreline ==
At the north side of this park is Edgar Street, reputedly the shortest street in Manhattan. Its gentle downward slope, also visible in the surrounding east/west streets, is the vestige of a ridge or bluff that ran parallel with the shoreline and crested at about Broadway, where Trinity Church is sited. It was a narrow street in its early days, no more than eighteen feet wide, called 'Tuyn Paat' or 'Garden Alley' in the Dutch period (1624–1664). When the British took control of the colony in 1664, the street name was changed with characteristic indifference to Tin Pot Alley.

The city government acquired the street in 1795, at which time its current name was affixed. Edgar likely refers to the family of William Edgar (1736–1820), a merchant from Detroit who came to New York circa 1780 and established a successful shipping business, with links to India and China. For a time, the street served as a thoroughfare or driveway leading to the Edgar family household located nearby. Until the western shoreline was filled in, this street ran to or very near the water's edge. The Robert and Anne Dickey House, located across Edgar Street from Elizabeth H. Berger Plaza, is the only structure remaining on Edgar Street.

The line of Greenwich Street was the approximate original coastline of Manhattan Island. In 1787, the Common Council acted on a pre-war proposal to expand the shoreline sixty feet into the Hudson River. Then began the construction of Greenwich Street, which soon hosted a row of Federal-style townhouses. Washington Street followed in approximately 1808 and West Street by 1830. The drop in grade from Broadway to Greenwich Street abruptly evens out where the landfill begins.

== Renaming and renovation ==
In October 2013, members of the Washington Street Historical Society, including Americans of Lebanese and Syrian descent, dedicated bench plaques inscribed with the names and quotes of individuals and groups that represent Arab-American culture. Edgar Street Plaza was renamed after Berger on December 16, 2013. With sculptural junipers along the benches, a small piazza surrounds a central planting area with oak leaf hydrangeas, viburnums and river birch trees, shielding park goers from traffic in an expanded green space.

In 2017, it was announced that the plaza would be combined with Trinity Plaza to the south and rebuilt into a 20,000-square-foot (1,900 m^{2}) park with tributes to Little Syria. The direct off-ramp from the Brooklyn-Battery Tunnel to Greenwich Street would be eliminated. As of April 2019, however, the park was delayed by several months due to the construction of a new school at 77 Greenwich Street, inside the former Dickey House. Construction is set to be complete by 2021.
