= Martin F. Tanahey =

American politician (1874–1930)

Member of the New York City Board of Aldermen
- In office January 1, 1922 – May 20, 1930
- Preceded by: Bernard E. Donnelly
- Succeeded by: David A. Mahoney
- Constituency: 1st district

Personal details
- Born: 1874 New York City, New York, U.S.
- Died: May 20, 1930 (aged 55–56) New York City, New York, U.S.
- Party: Democratic

Martin F. Tanahey (1874 – May 20, 1930) was an American politician who was the alderman of New York City's 1st district from 1922 to his death in 1930. A Democrat, he served much of the Lower East Side and Financial District in Manhattan.

Born on the Lower East Side, Tanahey was a member of the Tammany Hall political machine, serving under boss Tom Foley and holding appointed posts in the early 20th century before becoming alderman. Popular but in poor health, Tanahey was considered a possible Tammany leader of the 1st district after Foley's 1925 death but yielded to colleague Peter J. Hamill. He and Hamill would continue to be a part of local politics until Hamill died in January 1930; Tanahey himself would die of pneumonia in May. A playground was named in Tanahey's honor in 1952.

== Early life and career ==
Martin F. Tanahey was born on the Lower East Side in 1874. By the end of the 19th century, Tanahey was attached to local political boss Tom Foley, who was also helping the young Al Smith with his political career. Foley was the local leader of the Tammany Hall political machine that catered to the working class, especially Irish immigrants, and held picnics for lower- and working-class families. Tanahey himself was popular enough with gamblers of the Lower East Side for them to organize the "second annual coaching party of the Martin F. Tanahey Association" in 1900.

Tanahey began serving office around 1908, as chief clerk of the New York State Labor Department and later an assistant government appraiser in President Woodrow Wilson's administration. The latter appointment, which earned $3,500 ($47,300 in 2021) a year, was one of eight such positions deemed "choice morsels of patronage" by the New York Herald. Prior to the early 1920s, Tanahey and Foley were in New York County's 2nd Assembly district; after reapportionment, the 2nd district was merged into the 1st district. (Note: Prior to the 1960s, districts of the New York State Assembly – the lower house of its state legislature – represented parts of, and were districted by, counties of the state; New York County is coterminous with the Borough of Manhattan. The boundaries of aldermanic districts in Manhattan were based on Assembly districts and often, but not always, had the same boundaries.)

== Aldermanic tenure ==
Tanahey was first elected to the New York City Board of Aldermen in 1921, taking office on January 1, 1922. Within the Board he represented the 1st aldermanic district, which was coterminous with the 1st Assembly district. The district approximately covered Manhattan south of 10th Street, Broadway, Canal Street and Gouverneur Slip, encompassing the Financial District, Two Bridges, and most Lower East Side neighborhoods. Tanahey was one of the speakers of an event held by old friends of Smith, who had become the governor, on October 26, 1924. Several old associates of Smith from Manhattan, Brooklyn, and Queens attended the gathering.

Foley died in 1925, leaving a vacancy in the district leadership; Tanahey was one of seven people jointly acting as leader during the search for Foley's replacement. One of Foley's most intimate friends was tax commissioner John F. Gilchrist, who was an easy choice as the new leader but declined the position. Tanahey and Assemblyman Peter J. Hamill emerged as the two major candidates of the contest, which attracted more interest than usual as it was in Smith's home district. Tanahey's supporters noted that he lived in the former 2nd district like Foley, whereas Hamill lived in the western part of the new district. Tanahey's poor health, however, made him yield the contest to Hamill. Tammany Hall subsequently divided the district between Broadway; Hamill would lead the district east of Broadway despite his residence.

Tanahey and Hamill led the memorial procession for Foley at the third anniversary of his death. At the time of the 1928 presidential election, where Smith would become the Democratic nominee before losing to Republican Herbert Hoover, New York's 1st congressional district was split between Lower Manhattan and Staten Island. Both state parties sent one delegate and one alternate delegate representing each part of the district to their conventions; Tanahey was the Democratic alternate delegate from the Manhattan portion while Hamill served as its main delegate. Hamill died of complications from appendicitis on January 13, 1930.

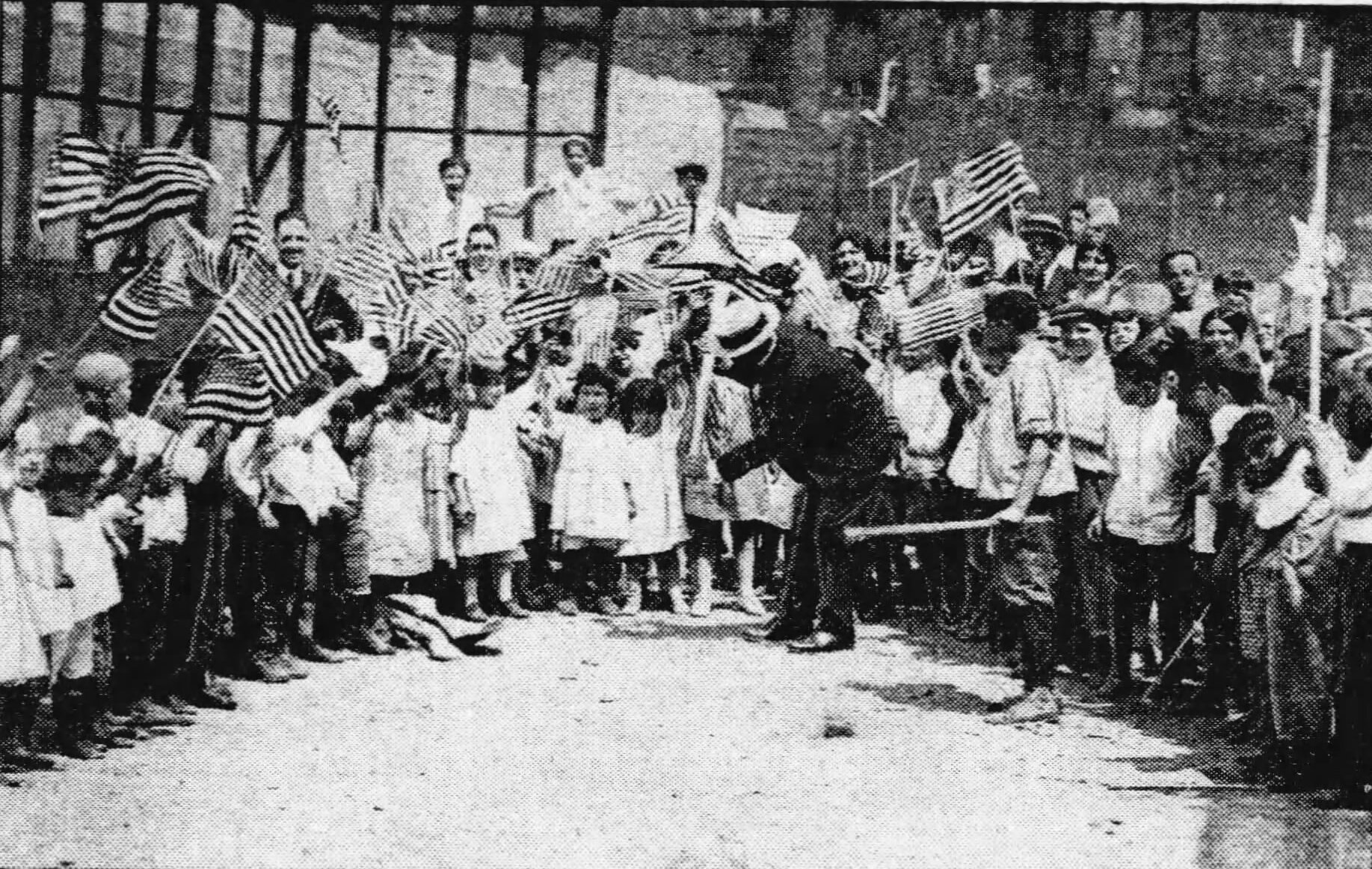
Tahaney breaking ground on a playground on Cherry Street in 1925

As alderman, Tanahey broke ground for a playground on Cherry Street in 1925. Tanahey and Murray W. Stand were the only aldermen to vote against a 3 a.m. curfew on nightclubs to take effect on January 1, 1927. The ordinance exempted hotels with more than 50 rooms, which critics like Stand argued meant that the ordinance targeted small businesses. Some supporters of the ordinance, however, justified their support for it upon criticizing out-of-towners as sullying New York's reputation and causing commotion.

Tanahey also legislated for pensions. He introduced a bill in 1926 to provide for credit in "paid service" rather than civil service to the federal government, an act incidentally found ultra vires by a decision of New York Supreme Court judge Joseph M. Proskauer invalidating ex-mayor John F. Hylan's pension. In 1929, Tanahey proposed an increase of police widows' monthly pension from $25 ($400 in 2021) to $50 ($800 in 2021) for all widows (beforehand, the $50 pension only applied to those widowed after August 26, 1926); originally flawed in its drafting, a corrected version was approved by the Board of Estimate and Apportionment first before its approval by the Board of Aldermen and mayor Jimmy Walker.

=== Electoral history ===
Aldermanic electoral history of Martin F. Tanahey
Year	Tanahey		Republican candidate			Socialist candidate		
1921	12,213	74.00%	Dwyer	2,265	13.72%	Goldofsky	2,025	12.27%
1923	Record of votes unavailable, but Tanahey victorious		Joseph F. Clements			Isidore Korn		
1925	12,983	84.68%	Michael Valinoti	1,998	13.03%	Isidore Korn	351	2.29%
1927	10,380	80.26%	Michael Valinoti	2,101	16.25%	Fruchter	452	3.49%
1929	11,450	79.67%	Herman R. Hayunga	2,529	17.60%	Morris Goldowsky	392	2.73%

== Personal life and death ==
Tanahey married, and had three daughters and five sons.

Tanahey died after a two-day bout of pneumonia in his home on May 20, 1930; he had been suffering from arthritis in the prior six months. The funeral was held at St. Teresa Church on May 23. In death he was described by The New York Times as "long ... a picturesque and popular figure in New York politics". On May 27, the remainder of the Board of Aldermen elected David A. Mahoney to fill his vacancy; Mahoney had been Hamill's secretary and assumed Tammany leadership of the eastern 1st district upon his death. Martin F. Tanahey Playground in Two Bridges was named in his honor in 1952.

== Works cited ==
- Golway, Terry (2014). Machine Made:Tammany Hall and the Creation of Modern American Politics. New York: Liveright. ISBN 978-0-87140-375-9.
