= Margaret Chin =

American politician (born 1953)

Margaret S. Chin
- 陳倩雯
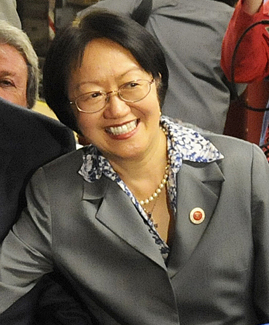
- Chin in 2011

Member of the New York City Council from the 1st district
- In office January 1, 2010 – December 31, 2021
- Preceded by: Alan Gerson
- Succeeded by: Christopher Marte

Personal details
- Born: May 26, 1953 (age 73) British Hong Kong
- Party: Democratic
- Spouse: Alan Tung
- Children: 1
- Education: Bronx High School of Science; City College of New York
- Website: Official website

Chinese name
- Traditional Chinese: 陳倩雯
- Simplified Chinese: 陈倩雯
Transcriptions
Standard Mandarin
- Hanyu Pinyin: Chén Qiànwén
Yue: Cantonese
- Yale Romanization: Chan^{4} Sin^{6}-man^{4}
other Yue
- Taishanese: Chin^{3} Sen^{5}-moon^{4}

Margaret S. Chin (born May 26, 1953) is a Chinese American politician who served as a council member for the 1st district of the New York City Council from 2010 to 2021. A Democrat, she and Queens Council member Peter Koo comprised the Asian American delegation of the city council.

Her district included all or parts of Battery Park City, Chinatown, Civic Center, East Village, Ellis Island, Financial District, Governors Island, Greenwich Village, Liberty Island, Little Italy, Lower East Side, NoHo, Nolita, SoHo, Tribeca, and the West Village.

== Early life and career ==
Born on May 26, 1954, in British Hong Kong as the third of five children and the only daughter in the family, Chin immigrated to the United States in 1963. Her father, who arrived in the U.S. before his family, was an undocumented worker, working as a waiter in the Bronx; his experiences inspired his daughter to advocate for immigration reform during her political tenure.

Chin grew up in Chinatown in New York City and graduated from the Bronx High School of Science and the City College of New York with a degree in education. She worked for 14 years at LaGuardia Community College's Division of Adult and Continuing Education.

She has been a member of several public service groups and organizations. In 1974, she was a founding member of Asian Americans for Equality, a group dedicated to "empowering Asian Americans and others in need", and she served as the board's president from 1982 to 1986. She was the chairperson of the New York Immigration Coalition, a policy and advocacy organization which works on issues concerning immigrants and refugees. She was a board member of the Association for Neighborhood and Housing Development, an affordable housing non-profit organization. Chin was also a founding member of the Chinatown Partnership Local Development Corporation, a group that was formed in 2006 to "rebuild Chinatown following 9/11, and to preserve the neighborhood's unique culture while ensuring its vitality in the future."

In local and state politics, Chin was a member of Manhattan Community Board 1 and Manhattan Community Board 3, and was elected to the New York State Democratic Committee for two terms from 1986 to 1990.

Chin has stated that her ethnicity helped her win the district that includes Chinatown. In her words, many new immigrants and seniors do not speak English, and appreciated that they could speak to her directly and "talk to a City Council member without having to go through an interpreter."

== New York City Council ==
Prior to winning the 2009 city council election, Chin had run and lost in the Democratic Party primary election for the District 1 seat in 1991, 1993, and 2001.

In a primary with low voter turnout, she won the Democratic nomination with 39% of the vote, ousting two-term incumbent Alan Gerson. Chin earned 4,541 votes to Gerson's 3,520; the other three candidates, PJ Kim, Pete Gleason, and Arthur Gregory won 1,927 votes, 1,293 votes, and 235 votes, respectively. Campaigning on the issues of affordable housing, improving infrastructure, immigration reform, and better services for senior citizens, Chin won the general election held on November 3, 2009, against Republican candidate Irene Horvath in a landslide, carrying 86% of the vote.

In 2013, Chin ran for reelection. She received an endorsement from the Stonewall Democratic Club of New York prior to that year's September Democratic Party primary and received funding from REBNY for mailings. She was challenged in the primary by Democrat Jenifer Rajkumar, a Lower Manhattan District Leader, in a widely publicized race. Chin won with 58.5% of the vote.

The councilwoman retained the right to run a third term due to legislation passed in 2008, despite New Yorkers subsequently voting against the concept in 2010. In 2017, Chin ran for re-election and won her primary with 46% of the vote against her main challenger, Christopher Marte, a newcomer who received 37%. Marte ran against her again in the general election on the Independence party line, and Chin won the general election with 49.9% of the vote.

== Election history ==
New York City Council District 1: results 1991-2017
Year	Democratic	Votes	Pct	Republican	Votes	Pct	3rd party	Party	Votes	Pct	3rd party	Party	Votes	Pct
1991	Kathryn Freed	5,717	51%	Fred Teng	2,630	23%	Margaret Chin	Liberal	2,853	25%				
2001	Alan Gerson	12,209	47%	Jordan Kaufman	3,349	13%	Margaret Chin	Liberal	4,178	16%				
2009	Margaret Chin	18,750	86%	Irene Horvath	3,093	14%								
2013	Margaret Chin	16,976	99%											
2017	Margaret Chin	11,468	49.8%	Bryan Jung	2,014	8.75%	Aaron Foldenauer	Liberal	1,103	4.40%	Christopher Marte	Independence	8,502	36.92%

== Criticism ==
In September 2017 The Villager endorsed her opponent Christopher Marte, saying:

While [Chin] has ably served some portions of her district, she has alienated her constituents in large swaths of it, including the Village and Soho, as well as the Lower East Side waterfront area where enormous 'supertall' towers are now beginning to sprout out of control. Chin has repeatedly failed to stand with residents in these neighborhoods on issues that are vitally important to their quality of life. And those times when she has made a show of support, it has always come too late — long after the time for action has passed and when it could have actually meant or done something. (See Niketown in Soho, Met Foods supermarket in Little Italy, etc.…)

...

Chin has been both antagonistic and unresponsive to large segments of her community. She has dodged debates with her opponents — ours wasn’t the only one she avoided — and at the only town hall she has held during her time in office, the public’s cherished First Amendment right to express their views and disseminate information was stifled in a manner one would associate with a fascistic dictatorship.

Critics in October 2019 also opposed her lack of clarity before the vote to expand the current jail in her district; more than 1,000 marched to get her attention on the matter.

On 8 November 2021, during the lame-duck period of her final term on the city council, Chin introduced a bill specifically targeting over 1600 housing units in her district designated as JLWQA (joint living-work quarters for artists) for fines and flip-taxes in the hundreds of thousands of dollars per unit. The legislation was introduced one day before a vote on rezoning the SoHo and NoHo neighborhoods in her district and was opposed by her elected successor, Christopher Marte. Chin nevertheless tabled and voted for the bill, triggering years of legal action after her retirement.

== Personal life ==
Chin is married to Alan Tung, a public school teacher, and has retired to San Diego, California. Their son, Kevin, also graduated from the Bronx High School of Science. He completed his studies at Syracuse University, and is now studying photography in Santa Barbara, California.

Political offices
Preceded by Alan Gerson	New York City Council, 1st district 2010–2021	Succeeded by Christopher Marte
