= Ingerman =

Ingerman is a surname. Notable people with the surname include:

- Anna Ingerman (1868–1931) Russian-born Jewish-American physician and socialist
- Helena Anthonia Maria Elisabeth Ingerman, birth name of Maria Dermoût (1888–1962), novelist from Dutch West Indies
- Martin Ingerman, birth name of Marty Ingels (1936–2015), American actor, comedian, comedy sketch writer, and theatrical agent
- Sergius Ingerman (1868–1943), Russian-born Jewish-American socialist and physician
- Shula Ingerman (1917–2016), Israeli cryptographer
- Yaakov Ingerman (1919–2007) Soviet Jewish spy in Nazi Germany and later Israeli intelligence officer

== See also ==
- Ingerman, Count of Hesbaye (c. 750-818), Frankish noble
