= 1929 New York City aldermanic election =

- November 5, 1929

All 65 seats of the New York City Board of Aldermen 33 seats needed for a majority
| | Majority party | Minority party |
|---|---|---|
| Party | Democratic | Republican |
| Last election | 66 (Note: The Board of Aldermen had comprised 72 seats in the 1927 election.) | 6 |
| Seats won | 61 | 4 |
| Seat change | ▼5 | ▼2 |

Elections were held to elect the New York City Board of Aldermen on November 5, 1929, in concert with other such contests as the Mayor, the Comptroller, the President of the Board of Aldermen, Borough presidents, County Sheriffs, and other miscellaneous questions.

Democrats won a majority of 61 seats while Republicans won 4 seats, all in Manhattan. In addition to their victory in the Board Democrats won resounding victories in the other contests in what was considered "a Crushing Defeat to [the] City G.O.P. [delivered]" by Tammany Hall. Three incumbent Republican aldermen were defeated by Democrats.

A Communist Party candidate in the election named Fanny Austin was the first Black woman to run for city office in New York City.

== Results by borough ==
Summary of results by borough
| Borough | Democratic aldermen | Republican aldermen | Total aldermen |
|---|---|---|---|
| Manhattan | 20 | 4 | 24 |
| The Bronx | 8 | - | 8 |
| Brooklyn | 24 | - | 24 |
| Queens | 6 | - | 6 |
| Richmond | 3 | - | 3 |
| Total | 61 | 4 | 65 |

== Results by district ==
=== Manhattan (Districts 1–24) ===
==== District 1 ====
Tammany incumbent Martin F. Tanahey was reelected, defeating Republican candidate Herman R. Hayunga and Socialist candidate Morris Goldowsky.

1929 New York City aldermanic election, 1st district
| Party | Candidate | Votes | % |
|---|---|---|---|
| Democratic | Martin F. Tanahey, incumbent | 11,450 | 79.67% |
| Republican | Herman R. Hayunga | 2,529 | 17.60% |
| Socialist | Morris Goldowsky | 392 | 2.73% |
| Majority | | 8,921 | 62.08% |
| Democratic hold |

==== District 2 ====
Incumbent Moritz Graubard defeated Republican candidate Harold H. Rothman and Socialist candidate Dominick Lodata to win reelection.

1929 New York City aldermanic election, 2nd district
| Party | Candidate | Votes | % |
|---|---|---|---|
| Democratic | Moritz Graubard, incumbent | 8,786 | 68.09% |
| Republican | Harold H. Rothman | 3,700 | 28.68% |
| Socialist | Dominick Lodata | 417 | 3.23% |
| Majority | | 5,086 | 39.42% |
| Democratic hold |

==== District 3 ====
Incumbent Edward J. Sullivan defeated Republican candidate Jack Garbarino and Socialist candidate Ernest K. Harrsen to win reelection.

1929 New York City aldermanic election, 3rd district
| Party | Candidate | Votes | % |
|---|---|---|---|
| Democratic | Edward J. Sullivan, incumbent | 12,927 | 77.95% |
| Republican | Jack Garbarino | 3,118 | 18.80% |
| Socialist | Ernest K. Harrsen | 539 | 3.25% |
| Majority | | 9,809 | 59.15% |
| Democratic hold |

==== District 4 ====
Incumbent Murray W. Stand defeated Republican candidate Sol Greenberg and Socialist candidate Samuel P. Ulanoff to win reelection.

1929 New York City aldermanic election, 4th district
| Party | Candidate | Votes | % |
|---|---|---|---|
| Democratic | Murray W. Stand, incumbent | 9,838 | 85.26% |
| Republican | Sol Greenberg | 1,324 | 11.47% |
| Socialist | Samuel P. Ulanoff | 377 | 3.27% |
| Majority | | 8,514 | 73.78% |
| Democratic hold |

==== District 5 ====
Democratic candidate John J. Mahoney defeated Republican candidate Thomas R. Kearney and Socialist candidate Benjamin Blumenberg to win the election.

1929 New York City aldermanic election, 5th district
| Party | Candidate | Votes | % |
|---|---|---|---|
| Democratic | John J. Mahoney | 13,248 | 83.85% |
| Republican | Thomas R. Kearney | 2,254 | 14.27% |
| Socialist | Benjamin Blumenberg | 298 | 1.87% |
| Majority | | 10,994 | 69.58% |

==== District 6 ====
Democratic candidate Saul Fassler defeated Republican incumbent Frank J. Dotzler and Socialist candidate August Claessens. Dotzler also ran under the Square Deal Party banner and Communist Adolph Bassen also contested this seat.

1929 New York City aldermanic election, 6th district (Note: Vote percentage includes the Socialists but does not account for such minor parties as the Communists.)
| Party | Candidate | Votes | % |
|---|---|---|---|
| Democratic | Saul Fassler | 6,485 | 47.92% |
| Republican | Frank J. Dotzler, incumbent | 5,983 | 44.21% |
| Socialist | August Claessens | 1,066 | 7.88% |
| Majority | | 502 | 3.71% |
| Democratic gain from Republican |

==== District 7 ====
Incumbent Walter F. Hagan defeated Republican candidate Lewis B. Freeman and Socialist candidate David Menin to win reelection.

1929 New York City aldermanic election, 7th district
| Party | Candidate | Votes | % |
|---|---|---|---|
| Democratic | Walter F. Hagan, incumbent | 10,327 | 61.75% |
| Republican | Lewis B. Freeman | 5,836 | 34.90% |
| Socialist | David Menin | 561 | 3.35% |
| Majority | | 4,491 | 26.85% |
| Democratic hold |

==== District 8 ====
Incumbent Louis J. Wronker defeated Republican candidate Joseph Marino and Socialist candidate Edward Levinson to win reelection. Communist Samuel Darcy also contested this seat.

1929 New York City aldermanic election, 8th district
| Party | Candidate | Votes | % |
|---|---|---|---|
| Democratic | Louis J. Wronker, incumbent | 6,084 | 59.69% |
| Republican | Joseph Marino | 3,114 | 30.55% |
| Socialist | Edward Levinson | 995 | 9.76% |
| Majority | | 2,970 | 29.14% |
| Democratic hold |

==== District 9 ====
Incumbent Dennis J. Mahon defeated Republican candidate Morton Baum and Socialist candidate Alexander Fichandler to win reelection.

1929 New York City aldermanic election, 9th district
| Party | Candidate | Votes | % |
|---|---|---|---|
| Democratic | Dennis J. Mahon, incumbent | 9,247 | 59.82% |
| Republican | Morton Baum | 5,570 | 36.03% |
| Socialist | Alexander Fichandler | 642 | 4.15% |
| Majority | | 3,677 | 23.79% |
| Democratic hold |

==== District 10 ====
Democratic candidate Harry R. Bell narrowly defeated Republican incumbent James A. Hatch by a plurality of 67 (Note: Erroneously given as 70.) votes, also defeating Socialist candidate Eugenia I. Low.

1929 New York City aldermanic election, 10th district
| Party | Candidate | Votes | % |
|---|---|---|---|
| Democratic | Harry R. Bell | 6,930 | 48.30% |
| Republican | James A. Hatch, incumbent | 6,863 | 47.83% |
| Socialist | Eugenia I. Low | 556 | 3.87% |
| Majority | | 67 | 0.47% |
| Democratic gain from Republican |

==== District 11 ====
Democratic incumbent Morton Moses defeated Republican candidate James W. Hyer and Socialist candidate Ephim H. Jeshurin to win reelection.

==== District 12 ====
Democratic incumbent John J. Barrett defeated Republican candidate Adolph Hartschuh and Socialist candidate Barnet Fenster to win reelection.

==== District 13 ====
Democratic incumbent Patrick S. Dowd defeated Republican candidate Frank C. Erb and Socialist candidate Morris Caspe to win reelection.

==== District 14 ====
Democratic incumbent James F. Carroll defeated Republican candidate Charles J. Bartunck and Socialist candidate George McMullen to win reelection.

==== District 15 ====
Republican incumbent Joseph Clark Baldwin defeated Democratic candidate Thomas M. Russell and Socialist candidate McAlister Coleman to win reelection.

==== District 16 ====
Democratic incumbent Edward Cassidy defeated Republican candidate John Stamp and Socialist candidate Bruno Wagner to win reelection.

==== District 17 ====
Democratic incumbent William Solomon defeated Republican candidate Irving Levy and Socialist candidate Bernard Schub to win reelection. Communist Libertad Narvaez also contested this seat.

==== District 18 ====
Democratic candidate Timothy J. Sullivan defeated Republican candidate Morris Cohen and Socialist candidate Nathan Zughaft.

==== District 19 ====
Republican incumbent Fred R. Moore defeated Democratic candidate Edward F. Kelly and Socialist candidate Max Kleinberg to win reelection.

==== District 20 ====
Republican candidate Frank A. Manzella defeated Democratic incumbent Edward T. Kellyand Socialist candidate Otto West to win reelection. Communist Gaetano DiFazio also contested this seat.

==== District 21 ====
Republican incumbent John C. Hawkins defeated Democratic candidate William H. Austin and Socialist candidate Ethelred Brown to win reelection. Communist Fanny Austin also contested this seat, as did Citizens' Committee of Harlem candidate E. Hortense Warner.

==== District 22 ====
Democratic incumbent John B. Henrich defeated Republican candidate James B. McEvoy and Socialist candidate George F. Meyer to win reelection.

==== District 23 ====
Democratic incumbent Joseph R. Smith defeated Republican candidate Alexander C. Woodward and Socialist candidate Fred Hodgson to win reelection.

==== District 24 ====
Democratic incumbent Charles J. McGillick defeated Republican candidate Matthew W. Hughes and Socialist candidate Benjamin Kaufman to win reelection.

=== The Bronx (Districts 25–32) ===
==== District 25 ====
Democratic incumbent Curley was reelected, defeating Republican candidate Adler and Socialist candidate Gross.

1929 New York City aldermanic election, 25th district
| Party | Candidate | Votes | % |
|---|---|---|---|
| Democratic | Curley, incumbent | 22,488 | 74.08% |
| Republican | Adler | 4,742 | 15.62% |
| Socialist | Gross | 3,125 | 10.29% |
| Majority | | 17,746 | 58.46% |
| Democratic hold |

==== District 26 ====
Democratic incumbent McDonald was reelected, defeating Republican candidate Lunney and Socialist candidate Wisotsky.

1929 New York City aldermanic election, 26th district
| Party | Candidate | Votes | % |
|---|---|---|---|
| Democratic | McDonald, incumbent | 10,295 | 59.84% |
| Republican | Lunney | 5,572 | 32.39% |
| Socialist | Wisotsky | 1,337 | 7.77% |
| Majority | | 4,723 | 27.45% |
| Democratic hold |

==== District 27 ====
Democratic incumbent Hanley was reelected, defeating Republican candidate Wurster and Socialist candidate Wechler.

1929 New York City aldermanic election, 27th district
| Party | Candidate | Votes | % |
|---|---|---|---|
| Democratic | Hanley, incumbent | 24,504 | 72.09% |
| Republican | Wurster | 7,169 | 21.09% |
| Socialist | Wechler | 2,318 | 6.82% |
| Majority | | 17,335 | 51.00% |
| Democratic hold |

==== District 28 ====
Democratic incumbent Sullivan was reelected, defeating Republican candidate Preyss and Socialist candidate Marshall.

1929 New York City aldermanic election, 28th district
| Party | Candidate | Votes | % |
|---|---|---|---|
| Democratic | Sullivan, incumbent | 11,137 | 68.72% |
| Republican | Preyss | 4,134 | 25.51% |
| Socialist | Marshall | 935 | 5.77% |
| Majority | | 7,003 | 43.21% |
| Democratic hold |

==== District 29 ====
Democratic incumbent Donovan was reelected, defeating Republican candidate Kirschner and Socialist candidate Conan.

1929 New York City aldermanic election, 29th district
| Party | Candidate | Votes | % |
|---|---|---|---|
| Democratic | Donovan, incumbent | 26,714 | 63.83% |
| Republican | Kirschner | 9,048 | 21.62% |
| Socialist | Conan | 6,090 | 14.55% |
| Majority | | 17,666 | 42.21% |
| Democratic hold |

==== District 30 ====
Democratic candidate Kinsley defeated Republican candidate Ruffolo and Socialist candidate Painken to win the election.

1929 New York City aldermanic election, 30th district
| Party | Candidate | Votes | % |
|---|---|---|---|
| Democratic | Kinsley, incumbent | 35,434 | 70.05% |
| Republican | Ruffolo | 10,353 | 20.47% |
| Socialist | Painken | 4,794 | 9.48% |
| Majority | | 25,081 | 49.59% |

==== District 31 ====
Democratic incumbent M. Gross was reelected, defeating Republican candidate H.L. Gross and Socialist candidate Fassberg.

1929 New York City aldermanic election, 31st district
| Party | Candidate | Votes | % |
|---|---|---|---|
| Democratic | M. Gross, incumbent | 14,424 | 71.84% |
| Republican | H. L. Gross | 3,830 | 19.07% |
| Socialist | Fassberg | 1,825 | 9.09% |
| Majority | | 10,594 | 52.76% |
| Democratic hold |

==== District 32 ====
Democratic incumbent Alford J. Williams was reelected, defeating Republican candidate Hale and Socialist candidate Deutsch.

1929 New York City aldermanic election, 32nd district
| Party | Candidate | Votes | % |
|---|---|---|---|
| Democratic | Alford J. Williams, incumbent | 16,915 | 68.46% |
| Republican | Hale | 6,129 | 24.81% |
| Socialist | Deutsch | 1,664 | 6.73% |
| Majority | | 10,786 | 43.65% |
| Democratic hold |

=== Brooklyn (Districts 33–56) ===
==== District 33 ====
Democratic incumbent Patrick J. McCann defeated Republican candidate Lewis and Socialist candidate Belsky to win reelection.

==== District 34 ====
Democratic incumbent McGarry defeated Republican candidate Amadel and Socialist candidate Schachner to win reelection.

==== District 35 ====
Democratic incumbent Dermody defeated Republican candidate Giffone and Socialist candidate Nemser to win reelection.

==== District 36 ====
Democratic incumbent Cunningham defeated Republican candidate Wolters and Socialist candidate Kritzer to win reelection.

==== District 37 ====
Democratic incumbent Molen defeated Republican candidate Printzlien and Socialist candidate Rosen to win reelection.

==== District 38 ====
Democratic incumbent O'Reilly defeated Republican candidate Reilly and Socialist candidate Rubinson to win reelection.

==== District 39 ====
Democratic candidate Ryan defeated Republican candidate Sachter and Socialist candidate Tuvin.

==== District 40 ====
Democratic candidate Richard J. Tonry defeated Republican candidate McPartland and Socialist candidate Cummings.

==== District 41 ====
Democratic incumbent Kiernan defeated Republican candidate Isnardi and Socialist candidate Block to win reelection.

==== District 42 ====
Democratic incumbent Weber defeated Republican candidate Surpless and Socialist candidate Weisberg to win reelection.

==== District 43 ====
Democratic incumbent Campbell defeated Republican candidate Feldman and Socialist candidate Wolfe to win reelection.

==== District 44 ====
Democratic incumbent Sahner defeated Republican candidate Klein and Socialist candidate Breckenridge to win reelection.

==== District 45 ====
Democratic incumbent Allen defeated Republican candidate Stewart and Socialist candidate Kurinsky to win reelection.

==== District 46 ====
Democratic incumbent Fenn defeated Republican candidate Skelton and Socialist candidate Smith to win reelection.

==== District 47 ====
Democratic incumbent Hartung defeated Republican candidate Devitt and Socialist candidate Laider to win reelection.

==== District 48 ====
Democratic incumbent John Cashmore defeated Republican candidate Wirth and Socialist candidate Sarasohn to win reelection.

==== District 49 ====
Democratic incumbent Reich defeated Republican candidate Mayers and Socialist candidate Chatcuff to win reelection.

==== District 50 ====
Democratic incumbent Hart defeated Republican candidate Ricca and Socialist candidate Sadoff to win reelection.

==== District 51 ====
Democratic incumbent McCusker defeated Republican candidate Zito and Socialist candidate Morris to win reelection.

==== District 52 ====
Democratic incumbent McGuinness defeated Republican candidate Campbell and Socialist candidate Babetskye to win reelection.

==== District 53 ====
Democratic incumbent Hilkemeier defeated Republican candidate Moehringer and Socialist candidate Mailman to win reelection.

==== District 54 ====
Democratic incumbent Rudd defeated Republican candidate Lachman and Socialist candidate Dann to win reelection.

==== District 55 ====
Democratic incumbent Ott defeated Republican candidate Greene and Socialist candidate Epstein to win reelection.

==== District 56 ====
Democratic incumbent Morris defeated Republican candidate Hower and Socialist candidate Breslow to win reelection.

=== Queens (Districts 57–62) ===
==== District 57 ====
Democratic incumbent Lenihan was reelected, defeating Republican candidate Austin and Socialist candidate Herman.

1929 New York City aldermanic election, 57th district
| Party | Candidate | Votes | % |
|---|---|---|---|
| Democratic | Lenihan, incumbent | 28,263 | 59.17% |
| Republican | Austin | 17,868 | 37.41% |
| Socialist | Herman | 1,635 | 3.42% |
| Majority | | 10,395 | 21.75% |
| Democratic hold |

==== District 58 ====
Democratic candidate O'Connell defeated Republican candidate Schuler and Socialist candidate Schoenbaum.

1929 New York City aldermanic election, 58th district
| Party | Candidate | Votes | % |
|---|---|---|---|
| Democratic | O'Connell | 36,490 | 49.60% |
| Republican | Schuler | 35,184 | 47.83% |
| Socialist | Schoenbaum | 1,893 | 2.57% |
| Majority | | 1,306 | 1.78% |

==== District 59 ====
Democratic candidate Gallagher defeated Republican incumbent Buss and Socialist candidate Magerlin.

1929 New York City aldermanic election, 59th district
| Party | Candidate | Votes | % |
|---|---|---|---|
| Democratic | Gallagher | 15,472 | 51.70% |
| Republican | Buss, incumbent | 13,620 | 45.51% |
| Socialist | Magerlin | 837 | 2.80% |
| Majority | | 1,852 | 6.18% |
| Democratic gain from Republican |

==== District 60 ====
Democratic candidate Posthauer defeated Republican candidate MacDevitt and Socialist candidate Cherkas.

1929 New York City aldermanic election, 60th district
| Party | Candidate | Votes | % |
|---|---|---|---|
| Democratic | Posthauer | 24,142 | 58.41% |
| Republican | Schuler | 17,187 | 41.59% |
| Socialist | Cherkas | - | 0.00% |
| Majority | | 6,955 | 16.83% |

==== District 61 ====
Democratic incumbent Schwab was reelected, defeating Republican candidate Roeding and Socialist candidate Stanley.

1929 New York City aldermanic election, 61st district
| Party | Candidate | Votes | % |
|---|---|---|---|
| Democratic | Schwab, incumbent | 21,305 | 67.26% |
| Republican | Roeding | 9,416 | 29.73% |
| Socialist | Stanley | 953 | 3.01% |
| Majority | | 11,889 | 37.54% |
| Democratic hold |

==== District 62 ====
Democratic candidate Deutschmann defeated Republican candidate Timms and Socialist candidate Smith.

1929 New York City aldermanic election, 62nd district
| Party | Candidate | Votes | % |
|---|---|---|---|
| Democratic | Deutschmann | 20,040 | 69.28% |
| Republican | Timms | 7,992 | 27.63% |
| Socialist | Smith | 894 | 3.09% |
| Majority | | 12,048 | 41.65% |

=== Richmond (Districts 63–65) ===
==== District 63 ====
Democratic incumbent Corcoran was reelected, defeating Republican candidate Roach and Socialist candidate Ferwerda.

1929 New York City aldermanic election, 63rd district
| Party | Candidate | Votes | % |
|---|---|---|---|
| Democratic | Corcoran, incumbent | 8,627 | 55.15% |
| Republican | Roach | 6,703 | 42.85% |
| Socialist | Ferwerda | 314 | 2.01% |
| Majority | | 1,924 | 12.30% |
| Democratic hold |

==== District 64 ====
Democratic incumbent Kaltenmeier was reelected, defeating Republican candidate Volkhardt and Socialist candidate Mattson.

1929 New York City aldermanic election, 64th district
| Party | Candidate | Votes | % |
|---|---|---|---|
| Democratic | Kaltenmeier, incumbent | 10,164 | 65.30% |
| Republican | Volkhardt | 5,045 | 32.41% |
| Socialist | Mattson | 356 | 2.29% |
| Majority | | 5,119 | 32.89% |
| Democratic hold |

==== District 65 ====
Democratic incumbent Dalton was reelected, defeating Republican candidate Winant and Socialist candidate Airola.

1929 New York City aldermanic election, 65th district
| Party | Candidate | Votes | % |
|---|---|---|---|
| Democratic | Dalton, incumbent | 6,807 | 56.85% |
| Republican | Winant | 4,897 | 40.90% |
| Socialist | Airola | 269 | 2.27% |
| Majority | | 1,910 | 15.95% |
| Democratic hold |
