= Anna Ingerman =

American physician (1868–1931)

- Анна Ингерман
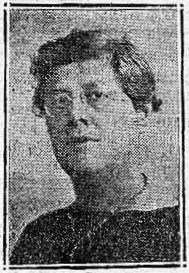
- Ingerman c. 1929
- Born: Anna Semyonorna Amitin; May 27, 1868; Vietka, Mogilev Governorate, Russian Empire
- Died: May 19, 1931 (aged 62); New York City, U.S.
- Education: University of Bern (M.D.)
- Occupations: Physician, socialist activist
- Political party: Socialist Labor (before 1901); Socialist (after 1901)
- Other political affiliations: Emancipation of Labour; RSDLP
- Spouse: Sergius Ingerman (m. 1889)
- Children: Eugenia
- Relatives: Francis E. Low (grandson)

Anna Ingerman (née Amitin; May 27, 1868 – May 19, 1931) was a Russian-born Jewish-American physician and prominent socialist. She was a founding member of the Socialist Party of America and ran for office in New York City as a Socialist Party candidate several times, but was never elected.

== Early life and education ==
Ingerman was born on May 27, 1868 in Vyetka, Mogilev Governorate, Russian Empire (now in Belarus), near the city of Gomel.

Ingerman attended gymnasium, a form of secondary education in Russia. In the late 1880s, she moved to Bern, Switzerland and studied medicine. While there, she joined Georgi Plekhanov's Group for the Emancipation of Labor (GEL), the first Russian Marxist organization. She graduated from the University of Bern in 1893.

Ingerman met Sergius Ingerman, a fellow medical student and socialist, while living in Bern. They married in May 1889 and had a daughter, Dr. Eugenia Ingerman Low. Her son-in-law Bela Low was a metallurgical expert for the War Production Board, and her grandson was theoretical physicist Francis E. Low.

== Career ==
Ingerman immigrated to America shortly after her husband Sergius, who immigrated in 1891. The couple settled in New York City. She was a member of the Socialist Labor Party, the Social Democratic Party of America in the late 1890s, the Socialist Party since its inception, and Russian Social-Democracy organizations in New York. She was a lecturer and teacher for numerous Russian, German, Jewish, and American study circles, women's clubs, and workingmen's societies connected to the socialist movement. In 1893, she founded the Arbeterin Fareyn (Workingwomen's Circle) with Adella Kean Zametkin and several other women, and in 1895 she led four thousand Jewish women who marched under its banner in the 1895 May Day Parade. She and Sergius established the Russian Social Democratic Society, which raised funds for the GEL and the Russian Social Democratic Workers' Party. She and Sergius were also ambassadors for the latter party's Menshevik wing.

Ingerman and Sergius visited Russia shortly after the 1905 Russian Revolution began, hoping that Czar Nicholas II would be overthrown. They stayed in Russia for three years before returning to America. They again returned to Russia after the 1917 Revolution, staying there for six months while Ingerman helped wounded people injured during the uprising. After returning to America, they spoke out against the regime of Lenin and Trotsky, claiming the true socialist faction was violently opposed to communism. She opposed the Soviet regime ever since, claiming she had opposed the Bolsheviks since 1905. In America, she was associated in her socialist work with Morris Hillquit and Algernon Lee. She also wrote socialist articles for newspapers in English and other languages, including the New York Call, the New Yorker Volkszeitung, the Novy Mir, and the Narodnaya Gazeta.

In the 1926 United States House of Representatives election, Ingerman ran for office as the Socialist candidate in New York's 17th congressional district. She lost to the election to Democrat William W. Cohen. In the 1927 New York City aldermanic election, she was the Socialist candidate for the New York City Board of Aldermen in Manhattan's 9th District, losing to Democrat Dennis J. Mahon. In 1928, she ran for the New York State Assembly as a Socialist in New York County's 15th District. She lost to Republican Abbot Low Moffat. In 1929, she ran for the Assembly again as a Socialist in New York County's 9th District, losing to Democrat Ira H. Holley.

== Death ==
Ingerman died in the Polyclinic Hospital following a severe surgery on May 19, 1931. Around 2,000 people attended her funeral in the Jewish daily Forward building, including Algernon Lee, Abraham Cahan, and Morris Hillquit Lee presided over the funeral. She was cremated at Fresh Pond Crematory.
