= New York City's 1st City Council district =

- Boundaries following the 2020 census

Government
  - Councilmember: Christopher Marte (D—Lower East Side)

Population (2010)
  - Total: 168,966

Demographics
  - White: 45%
  - Asian: 36%
  - Hispanic: 12%
  - Black: 4%
  - Other: 3%

Registration
  - Democratic: 63.2%
  - Republican: 9.9%
  - No party preference: 23.8%
- Registered voters (2021) 125,594

New York City's 1st City Council district is one of 51 districts in the New York City Council. It is currently represented by Democrat Christopher Marte, who took office in 2022.

== Geography ==
=== 2020s ===
District 1 is based in the farthest southern neighborhoods of Manhattan, covering the Financial District, Chinatown, Tribeca, SoHo, Battery Park City, Civic Center, Little Italy, and parts of the Lower East Side. Also in the district are Governors Island, Ellis Island, Liberty Island, City Hall, the South Street Seaport and the World Trade Center. It also (geographically) includes the piers connecting the Columbia Street Waterfront District and the Brooklyn Bridge Park promenade in Brooklyn.

The district overlaps with Manhattan Community Boards 1, 2, and 3, and is entirely contained within New York's 10th congressional district. It also overlaps with the 26th and 27th districts of the New York State Senate, and with the 61st, 65th and 66th districts of the New York State Assembly.

With New York's original Chinatown making up a significant portion of its population, the district has a higher proportion of Asian Americans than any other district in Manhattan. When she was elected in 2009, Chin became the first Asian American woman to serve on the City Council.

=== 2010s ===
District 1 is based in the farthest southern neighborhoods of Manhattan, covering the Financial District, Chinatown, Tribeca, SoHo, Battery Park City, Civic Center, Little Italy, NoHo, and part of the Lower East Side. Also in the district are Governors Island, Ellis Island, Liberty Island, Washington Square Park, City Hall, and the World Trade Center.

The district overlaps with Manhattan Community Boards 1, 2, and 3, and with New York's 7th, 10th, and 12th congressional districts. It also overlaps with the 26th and 27th districts of the New York State Senate, and with the 65th and 66th districts of the New York State Assembly.

== Recent election results ==
=== 2025 ===
2025 New York City Council election, District 1 Democratic primary
Party	Candidate	Maximum round	Maximum votes	Share in maximum round	Maximum votes First round votes Transfer votes
Democratic	Christopher Marte (incumbent)	5	13,594	61.9%	
Democratic	Elizabeth Lewinsohn	5	8,372	38.1%	
Democratic	Jess Coleman	4	4,220	18.9%	
Democratic	Eric Yu	2	2,464	10.1%	
Write-in		1	120	0.5%	

2025 New York City Council election, District 1 general election
Party	Candidate	Votes	%
Democratic	Christopher Marte	29,027	
Working Families	Christopher Marte	4,839	
Total	Christopher Marte (incumbent)	33,866	71.6
Republican	Helen Qiu	12,118	
Conservative	Helen Qiu	1,120	
Total	Helen Qiu	13,238	28.0
Write-in		179	0.4
Total votes		47,283	100.0
Democratic hold			

=== 2023 (redistricting) ===
Due to redistricting and the 2020 changes to the New York City Charter, councilmembers elected during the 2021 and 2023 City Council elections will serve two-year terms, with full four-year terms resuming after the 2025 New York City Council elections.

2023 New York City Council election, District 1
Primary election
Party	Candidate	Votes	%
Democratic	Christopher Marte (incumbent)	5,485	62.6
Democratic	Susan Lee	2,707	30.9
Democratic	Ursila Jung	441	5.0
Democratic	Pooi Stewart	97	1.1
Write-in		31	0.4
Total votes		8,761	100.0
General election
Democratic	Christopher Marte (incumbent)	9,038	68.1
Republican	Helen Qiu	3,661	
Conservative	Helen Qiu	441	
Total	Helen Qiu	4,102	30.9
Write-in		123	1.0
Total votes		13,263	100
Democratic hold			

=== 2021 ===
In 2019, voters in New York City approved Ballot Question 1, which implemented ranked-choice voting in all local elections. Under the new system, voters have the option to rank up to five candidates for every local office. Voters whose first-choice candidates fare poorly will have their votes redistributed to other candidates in their ranking until one candidate surpasses the 50 percent threshold. If one candidate surpasses 50 percent in first-choice votes, then ranked-choice tabulations will not occur.

2021 New York City Council election, District 1 Democratic primary
Party	Candidate	Maximum round	Maximum votes	Share in maximum round	Maximum votes First round votes Transfer votes
Democratic	Christopher Marte	8	10,785	60.5%	
Democratic	Jenny Low	8	7,054	39.5%	
Democratic	Gigi Li	7	4,662	23.9%	
Democratic	Maud Maron	5	2,495	12.1%	
Democratic	Susan Lee	4	2,020	9.6%	
Democratic	Sean Hayes	3	928	4.3%	
Democratic	Tiffany Johnson-Winbush	3	809	3.7%	
Democratic	Susan Damplo	2	344	1.6%	
Democratic	Denny Salas	2	292	1.3%	
Write-in		1	43	0.2%	

An interactive map of District 1

2021 New York City Council election, District 1 general election
Party	Candidate	Votes	%
Democratic	Christopher Marte	16,733	72.1
Independent NY	Maud Maron	3,265	14.1
Republican	Jacqueline Toboroff	3,166	13.6
Write-in		48	0.2
Total votes		23,212	100
Democratic hold			

=== 2017 ===
2017 New York City Council election, District 1
Primary election
Party	Candidate	Votes	%
Democratic	Margaret Chin (incumbent)	5,363	45.7
Democratic	Christopher Marte	5,141	43.9
Democratic	Aaron Foldenauer	734	6.3
Democratic	Dashia Imperiale	459	3.9
Write-in		22	0.2
Total votes		11,719	100
General election
Democratic	Margaret Chin	10,963	
Working Families	Margaret Chin	942	
Total	Margaret Chin (incumbent)	11,905	49.9
Independence	Christopher Marte	8,753	36.7
Republican	Bryan Jung	2,111	8.8
Liberal	Aaron Foldenauer	1,059	4.4
Write-in		33	0.2
Total votes		23,861	100
Democratic hold			

=== 2013 ===
2013 New York City Council election, District 1
Primary election
Party	Candidate	Votes	%
Democratic	Margaret Chin (incumbent)	8,846	58.9
Democratic	Jenifer Rajkumar	6,171	41.1
Write-in		7	0.0
Total votes		15,024	100
General election
Democratic	Margaret Chin	15,773	
Working Families	Margaret Chin	1,203	
Total	Margaret Chin (incumbent)	16,976	98.6
Write-in		247	1.4
Total votes		17,223	100
Democratic hold			

== History ==
The wards established in 1683. The Out Ward covered the rest of Manhattan. The pink line is the modern shoreline.

New York City was divided into wards in 1683; all of the wards were located in what is now the 1st district, and each ward except for the "Out" Ward had the entirety of its territory in the modern-day 1st district. Wards were given numbers in 1791, and the previous "South" Ward was given the 1st ward number. By 1808 the 1st ward had expanded to encompass all of Manhattan south of Maiden Lane.

By the middle of the 19th century, wards no longer elected aldermen or other municipal representatives, who were elected instead by Assembly district. Upon consolidation in 1898, a bicameral Municipal Assembly was installed wherein the upper Council elected members from specialized districts and the lower Board of Aldermen continued to elect its membership from State Assembly districts. This arrangement proved to be short-lived, however, as a unicameral Board of Aldermen was established in its place in 1902. This Board had districts that usually but not always corresponded to Assembly districts; throughout this time the 1st aldermanic district was coterminous with New York County's 1st Assembly district. These districts were abolished in 1938 in favor of borough-wide proportional representation, but were restored in 1947 to prevent Communist council members from being elected.

=== Previous councilmembers ===
- Martin F. Tanahey (1922–1930)
- Proportional representation (1938–1947)
- Saul Sharison (1965–1974)
- Anthony Gaeta (1974–1977)
- Nicholas LaPorte (1977–1985)
- Frank Fossella (1985)
- Susan Molinari (1986–1990)
- Alfred Cerullo (1990–1991)
- Kathryn E. Freed (1991–2002)
- Alan Gerson (2002–2010)
- Margaret Chin (2010–2022)
