= Chuck Fager =

American writer

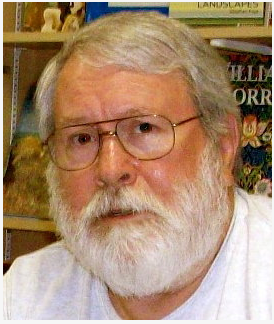
- Chuck Fager in Fayetteville, North Carolina
- Born: Charles Eugene Fager; 1942 (age 83–84); Birmingham, Kansas, U.S.
- Education: Colorado State University
- Occupations: Author, Editor, Publisher, Activist
- Organization: Religious Society of Friends
- Movement: Civil Rights Movement, Peace movement

Charles Eugene Fager (born 1942), known as Chuck Fager, is an American activist, author, editor, publisher and an outspoken and prominent member of the Religious Society of Friends or Quakers. He is known for his work in both the Civil Rights Movement and in the Peace movement. His written works include religious and political essays, humor, adult fiction, and juvenile fiction, and he is best known for his 1974 book Selma 1965: The March That Changed the South, his in-depth history of the 1965 Selma Voting Rights Movement, which led to the passage of the Voting Rights Act.

From 2002 to 2012 Fager served as Director of Quaker House in Fayetteville, North Carolina, a peace project founded in 1969 near Fort Bragg, a major US Army base.

== Early life ==
Charles E. Fager was born in Kansas to a Roman Catholic family. He is the oldest of eleven children. He grew up on various United States Air Force bases.

== Education ==
In high school, Fager left Catholicism, and for some years regarded himself as an atheist. However, he was interested in religion, and at that time was much influenced by the work of C.G. Jung, who took religion seriously, if in an unorthodox way.

Fager enrolled at Colorado State University in 1960. There he was in the Air Force Reserve Officers' Training Corps at Colorado State University, where he won a medal as the Outstanding Freshman Cadet, and later commanded a prize-winning AFROTC drill team. However, by his senior year his interest in the air force had waned, and he voluntarily left the ROTC. After leaving Colorado in late 1964, he completed a B. A. in Humanities from Colorado State University in 1967.

He attended Harvard Divinity School, mostly part-time, for four years, starting in 1968. In 1994 he completed a Doctor of Ministry at the Graduate Theological Foundation now in Mishawaka, Indiana.

== Activism ==
Fager moved to Atlanta, Georgia in late summer 1964, and soon became active in the Civil Rights Movement. In December 1964 he joined the staff of the Southern Christian Leadership Conference (SCLC) in Atlanta, and was later sent by the SCLC to Selma, Alabama where he took part in the 1965 Selma Voting Rights Movement organized and directed by James Bevel. During that time Fager was arrested three times and spent one night in a jail cell with Dr. Martin Luther King Jr., as told in his book, Eating Dr. King's Dinner, his personal story of his early life and activism.

Fager left Selma in early 1966. His experience with Dr. King's nonviolence led him to jettison the pro-war outlook he had inherited from a youth spent on military bases, and in late 1965 he had successfully applied for status as a conscientious objector (or CO) to the military draft. As a result, he was required to perform two years of alternative service. This service was performed first at Friends World Institute, later Friends World College based in Long Island, New York. He then completed his service at the New York City Department of Social Services.

Fager later participated in several peaceful protests against the Vietnam War. During that time he was arrested twice.

In 1968, he signed the “Writers and Editors War Tax Protest” pledge, vowing to refuse tax payments in protest against the Vietnam War.

In the late 1970s, Fager was briefly active in the anti-abortion movement, making connections with some anti-war-minded activists in it. However, he never supported the idea of legal prohibition of all abortions. He taught workshops on nonviolent protest at anti-abortion conferences, as described in the book, "Wrath of Angels," by James Risen and Judy Thomas (Basic Books, 1998, P. 60f). However, as the political and religious right essentially absorbed the anti-abortion movement in the early 1980s, Fager moved away from it, repudiated its increasingly rightwing and repressive character, and also reconsidered his understanding of the embryology and metaphysics involved. This evolution is described in his essay, "Abortion and Civil War". A portion of this essay was published in The New Republic, in its May 30, 1988 issue under the title, "Fetal Distraction."

== Involvement with the Society of Friends ==
=== Membership ===
Fager first met Quakers in Selma, Alabama in late 1965 when students from the newly launched Friends World Institute came to help with voter registration. He joined the institute to serve his CO obligation and became acquainted with some Quakers who were involved in it. He worked as a junior instructor at that college in 1966–1967. In 1969 he joined the Friends Meeting at Cambridge, Massachusetts, while he was studying at Harvard Divinity School. Since then he has been a member of a number of Friends Meetings. He is currently (2014) a member of State College Meeting which is dually-affiliated with Baltimore Yearly Meeting and Philadelphia Yearly Meeting. As he now lives in Durham, NC, he looked around the Meetings in the area and now attends Spring Meeting near Eli Witney in Alamance County.

=== Publications and Professional Pilgrimage ===
In high school during the late 1950s, Fager got in trouble for writing and circulating a clandestine collection of satiric articles poking fun at teachers and school administrators. He has been writing ever since. He began work as a journalist in college, and in 1967, published his first book, White Reflections On Black Power, followed in 1969 by Uncertain Resurrection: The Poor Peoples Washington Campaign. He later took up journalistic reporting, mainly for "alternative" papers in the Boston-Cambridge area, while still enrolled at Harvard Divinity School. By late 1970, he was free-lancing full-time. In the early 1970s he was commissioned by Charles Scribner's Sons to write a history of the Selma Voting Rights Movement. This became Selma 1965, the March that Changed the South, first published in 1974 and republished in 1984 and 2005. It is available from Kimo Press.

From Massachusetts Fager moved in 1975 to San Francisco, where he became a full-time freelance feature reporter for the San Francisco Bay Guardian. One subject of his reporting there was former Congressman Pete McCloskey. By 1978, after Fager had moved to the Washington DC area, McCloskey hired him as a Congressional staffer for the U.S. House Merchant Marine and Fisheries Committee. He stayed in this position until early 1981, when McCloskey began an unsuccessful run for the Senate. Despite his high regard for McCloskey, Fager was not drawn to stay on Capitol Hill, and was content to leave it shortly thereafter for the renewed uncertainties of the freelance writer's path.

In 1985 Fager began work for the U.S. Postal Service in northern Virginia, first as a substitute Rural Mail Carrier, and then as a Mailhandler, until mid-1994. The pay and benefits of the jobs were good for him and his family (four children). During these years of blue collar manual labor, however, Fager continued to be productive as a writer. He drew on this experience for his second mystery novel, Un-Friendly Persuasion, available from Kimo Press.

In 1979 Fager founded his own Kimo Press, which publishes Quaker literature, most of which was written by Fager himself. Beginning in 1981, he also edited an independent, muckraking and gadfly Quaker newsletter called A Friendly Letter, which continued until early 1993. He founded a journal entitled Quaker Theology in 1999. This is still published once or twice a year covering current events and religious thought among Quakers.

After leaving the Postal Service in 1994, Fager was hired to create an Issues Program at Pendle Hill, a Quaker study center in Wallingford, Pennsylvania. From there, in 1997, he moved to Bellefonte, PA, where he returned to freelance writing, and later taught courses in Business Writing at Penn State University. After the attacks of September 11, 2001, he agreed to take the position of Director of Quaker House, a Quaker peace project in Fayetteville NC, near Fort Bragg. He retired from Quaker House in November 2012.

Fager continues his research and writing. In 2013–2014, he was the Cadbury Scholar in Quaker history at Pendle Hill; while there he researched and wrote two books on the "Progressive Friends" movement of the 19th and early 20th centuries.

In his writing, Fager has pursued several abiding interests: reporting, especially about current social issues such as the Civil Rights Movement, recent wars, militarism, and torture; religion, with special focus on Quakerism, or the Society of Friends; and stories, particularly for younger readers.

In July 2013, Fager was arrested in a peaceful protest that was part of the "Moral Mondays" campaign in North Carolina.

=== Organizations ===
From 1996 to 2002 Fager also held the position of Clerk in the Fellowship of Quakers in the Arts. He also was Clerk for the 2001 Quaker Peace Roundtable, and organizer of "A conference on The Military-Industrial Complex at 50", in January 2011. Since early 2005 he has been part of the Quaker Initiative to End Torture (QUIT).

== Personal life ==
Fager has been married and divorced twice. He has fathered four children.

== Selected works ==
- White Reflections on Black Power, Eerdmans Publishing Co., 1967.
- Uncertain Resurrection: The Poor Peoples Washington Campaign, Eerdmans Publishing Co., 1969.
- Selma 1965: The March That Changed the South, Charles Scribner's Sons, 1974; Beacon Press, 1985; Kimo Press, 2005.
- The Magic Quilts: A Fantasy, Kimo Press, 1981 and 1989.
- A Respondent Spark: the Basics of Bible Study, Kimo Press, 1984 and 1994.
- A Man Who Made a Difference: the Life of David H. Scull, Langley Hill Friends Meeting, 1985.
- Quakers Are Funny, Kimo Press, 1987.
- Editor, Quaker Service at the Crossroads, Kimo Press, 1988.
- Life and Death and Two Chickens: Stories for Children, Stories of Childhood, Kimo Press, 1989.
- Wisdom and Your Spiritual Journey: A Study of Wisdom in the Biblical and Quaker Traditions, Kimo Press, 1990.
- Fire in the Valley, Quaker Ghost Stories, Kimo Press, 1991.
- Murder Among Friends, A Quaker Mystery, Kimo Press, 1993.
- Un-Friendly Persuasion, A Quaker Mystery, Kimo Press, 1995.
- Without Apology: the Heroes, the Heritage and the Hope of Liberal Quakerism, Kimo Press, 1996.
- Editor, Friends and the Vietnam War, Pendle Hill, 1998.
- A Quaker Declaration of War, Kimo Press, 2003.
- The Harlot's Bible: Quaker Essays, Kimo press 2003.
- Shaggy Locks & Birkenstocks: Studies in Liberal Quaker History, Kimo Press, 2003.
- Why God Is Like A Wet Bar of Soap: Quaker Stories, Kimo Press 2004.
- Eating Dr. King's Dinner: A Memoir of the Movement, Kimo Press, 2005.
- Tom Fox Was My Friend. Yours, Too., Kimo press 2006.
- Friends and Torture, Friends Journal, September 1, 2007.
- Study War Some More (If You Want to Work for Peace), Quaker House, 2010.
- Editor, Keeping Us Honest, Stirring the Pot: A Festschrift in Honor of H. Larry Ingle , Kimo Press, 2012.
- Quakers Are Hilarious, Kimo press 2013.
- Paper Trail: Writings from the Front Line of Peace Action: Quaker House/Fort Bragg North Carolina, Kimo press 2013.
- Angels of Progress: A Documentary History of Progressive Friends, 1822-1940, Kimo Press 2014
- Remaking Friends: How Progressive Friends Changed Quakerism & Helped Save America, Kimo Press 2014
- Meetings: A Religious Autobiography, Kimo Press, 2016
