= Grand Central Partnership =

Organization in New York City

- Founded: 1985
- Purpose: The care of the Business Improvement District surrounding Grand Central Terminal stretching, roughly, from 35th to 54th Streets and from Second to Fifth Avenues.
- Location: New York City, New York
- Key people: Alfred C. Cerullo III, Chief Executive Officer and Peter S. Kalikow, Chairman
- Website: grandcentralpartnership.nyc

The Grand Central Partnership manages the Grand Central Business Improvement District, one of the largest business improvement districts in the world. It comprises 76,000,000 square feet (7,100,000 m^{2}) of commercial space in a 70-block area of Midtown Manhattan, New York City, around Grand Central Terminal. Its irregular borders reach from East 35th Street to East 54th Street and from Second Avenue to Fifth Avenue.

== Creation ==
Midtown Manhattan property owners and businesses created the Grand Central Partnership in the mid-1980s during a period of marked physical and economic deterioration. Once in place, GCP developed a comprehensive plan to specifically revitalize the neighborhood surrounding Grand Central Terminal, which included an ambitious capital improvement program, a privately managed sanitation, maintenance and public safety operation, business assistance initiatives, a broad tourism and visitor services program, and a social services component. Since its founding, GCP has made substantial contributions to the dramatic turnaround of Midtown Manhattan, and, together with the renowned restoration of Grand Central Terminal, GCP's programs are widely credited with playing a major role in transforming the neighborhood into one of the world's preeminent central business districts.

== Management ==
GCP's operations are managed by a board of directors and officers elected by the District Management Association, a voluntary organization made up of property owners, commercial and residential tenants in the district, as well as representatives of elected officials.

The Grand Central Partnership is a not-for-profit corporation funded principally through special assessments collected from commercial property owners located within its defined geographic area. Additional financial support is provided through corporate sponsorship of specific programs and special events and through in-kind services. Assessment proceeds and tax-exempt bonds have funded capital improvements.

== Public Safety Department ==
The Grand Central Partnership also hires "Public Safety Officers" who patrol the areas that the GCP owns or operates property on. These officers are hired at 11.00 dollars an hour and are charged to assist authorities, when necessary, by reporting incidents and maintaining order until their arrival. They are certified Security officers in the State of New York prior to their employment.

Officers are also assigned to the Partnership's Taxi Stands to maintain traffic flow and ensure the safety of visitors.

=== Uniforms and Equipment ===
GCP Public Safety Officers are often found on foot patrol with red and black variant uniforms. They often wear an Oval Eagle Top badge with no citation bars and, occasionally, one may see the officer's nameplate on a leather NYPD style badge holder.

The GCP's PSOs are also often wearing a black champagne hat and carry a radio connected to NYPD channels to report emergencies to authorities.
