= Kathryn E. Freed =

American politician

Justice of the New York Supreme Court from the 1st Judicial district
- In office 2012–2021
- Appointed by: A. Gail Prudenti

Judge of the New York City Civil Court
- In office 2006–2011

Judge of the New York City Criminal Court
- In office 2004–2005

Member of the New York City Council from the 1st district
- In office January 1, 1992 – December 31, 2001
- Preceded by: Alfred C. Cerullo III
- Succeeded by: Alan Gerson

Personal details
- Born: October 25, 1946 (age 79)
- Party: Democratic
- Education: Temple University (B.S.); New York Law School (J.D.)
- Occupation: Judge; lawyer

Kathryn E. Freed (born October 25, 1946) is an American lawyer, politician, and former judge, who served as a New York Supreme Court Justice from 2012 to 2021.

== Early life and education ==
Freed graduated with a bachelor's degree from Temple University in 1969 and a J.D. from New York Law School in 1977.

== Career ==
Freed served on the New York City Council from the 1st district from 1992 to 2001.

She served as a Judge of the New York City Criminal Court from 2004 to 2005 and the New York City Civil Court from 2006 to 2011, serving first in Kings County (Brooklyn) and followed by New York County (Manhattan).

In 2012, she was appointed by Chief Administrative Judge A. Gail Prudenti to become an Acting Justice of the New York Supreme Court, 1st District. She ran unopposed in the general election in 2014 and was elected to a 14-year term.

She was forced to retire in 2021, when then-Governor Andrew Cuomo exercised his emergency powers to order the judiciary to cut judges over the age of 70 to save $300 million due to a $14.5 billion state budget deficit caused by the pandemic.
