= Alan Gerson =

American lawyer

Alan J. Gerson

Member of the New York City Council from the 1st district
- In office January 1, 2002 – December 31, 2009
- Preceded by: Kathryn E. Freed
- Succeeded by: Margaret Chin
- Constituency: Manhattan: SoHo, NoHo, TriBeCa, Washington Square area, South Village, Battery Park City, Wall Street area, South Street Seaport area, City Hall area, Little Italy, Chinatown, Lower East Side

Personal details
- Born: November 1, 1957 (age 68)
- Party: Democratic
- Education: Stuyvesant High School; Columbia College; Columbia Law School
- Profession: Lawyer

Alan Jay Gerson (born November 1, 1957) is a former Democratic Party member of the New York City Council, first elected in 2001, and reelected in 2003 and 2005, to represent the 1st district in Manhattan. Prior to that Gerson served as Chair of Manhattan Community Board 2 from 1998 to 1999, serving on its board from 1990 to 2001. Gerson lost the Democratic Primary to Margaret Chin on September 15, 2009, following previous challenges by her in the 2001 and 2004 primaries. The district is located in Lower Manhattan and includes Tribeca, portions of the Lower East Side, Chinatown, Little Italy, Greenwich Village, and the Financial District.

Gerson is a lifelong New York City resident and graduate of P.S. 41, I.S. 70, and Stuyvesant High School (1975). He graduated Phi Beta Kappa and magna cum laude from Columbia College of Columbia University (1979), and was a Harlan Fiske Stone Scholar from Columbia Law School. He was an aide to New York State Assembly Member William Passannante. Gerson practiced law with Kelley Drye & Warren for 18 years.

Political offices
Preceded by Kathryn E. Freed	New York City Council, 1st district 2002–2009	Succeeded by Margaret Chin
