= Sergius Ingerman =

American physician (1868–1943)

- Сергей Ингерман
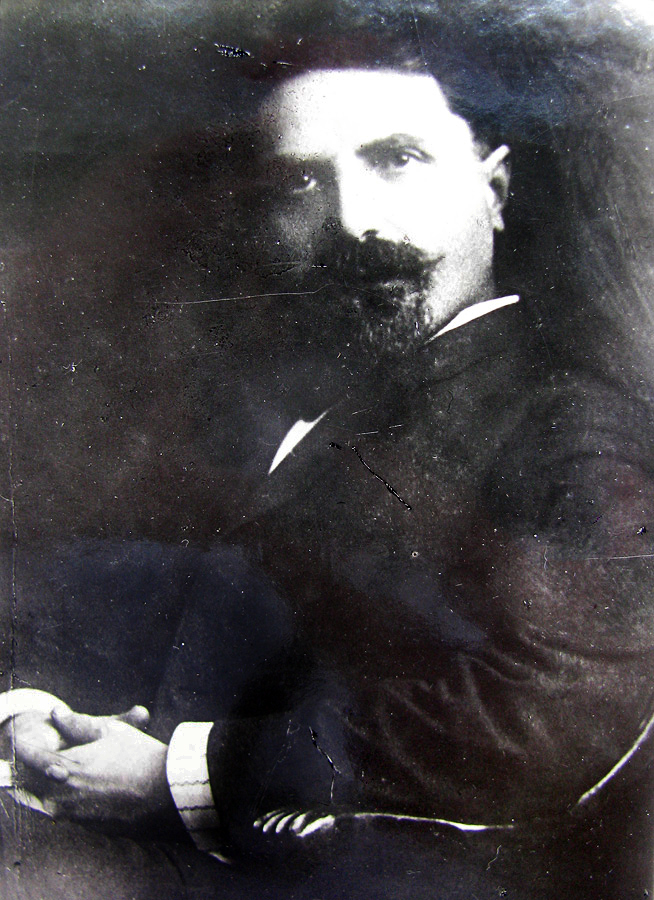
- Born: Sergey Mikhalovich Ingerman; August 15, 1868; Kamenetz-Podolsk, Podolia Governorate, Russian Empire
- Died: February 18, 1943 (aged 74); New York City, U.S.
- Education: University of Bern (M.D.)
- Occupations: Physician, socialist activist
- Political party: Socialist Labor (before 1901); Socialist (after 1901)
- Other political affiliations: Emancipation of Labour; RSDLP
- Spouse: Anna Amitin (m. 1889; died 1931)
- Children: Eugenia
- Relatives: Francis E. Low (grandson)

Sergius Ingerman (August 15, 1868 – February 18, 1943) was a Ukrainian-born Jewish-American socialist and physician.

== Life ==
Ingerman was born on August 15, 1868, in Kamenetz-Podolsk, Podolia Governorate, Russian Empire, the son of Michael Ingerman and Tessia Bleitzstein.

Ingerman went to the University of Bern in Bern, Switzerland, graduating from there with an M.D. in 1889. He worked as an intern in the university's medical faculty in 1890. In 1891, he immigrated to America. He was an instructor in nose and throat diseases in the New York University College of Medicine from 1903 to 1906. In 1906, he returned to Russia and worked as an assistant in the ear department of the Women's Medical College in St. Petersburg. He returned to America in 1909 and to the New York University College of Medicine as an instructor in the eye department. He was also an ophthalmologist in Beth David Hospital, laryngologist for the Workmen's Circle Tubercular Sanatorium in Liberty, New York, for 22 years, and author of a study on malignant tumors in the nasal cavity. He was president of the Russian Medical Society from 1924 to 1935, chairman of the advisory board of the Workmen's Circle Medical Department, and a member of the American Academy of Ophthalmology and Otolaryngology, the New York Academy of Medicine, and the New York County Medical Society.

While studying in Odessa as a youth, Ingerman joined the Narodnaya Volya. His activities against the Russian regime led him to leave Russia in 1884 and go to Switzerland. After arriving in America, he became active in the Socialist Labor Party under Daniel De Leon. He helped form the Socialist Party of America with Eugene V. Debs and Morris Hillquit in the turn of the century following a split with De Leon over policy and tactics. He returned to Russia to take part in the 1905 Russian Revolution. He attended the 1907 congress of the Russian Social Democratic Labour Party in Stockholm that led to the division between the Mensheviks and the Bolsheviks. When he returned to America, he helped found the paper Novy Mir. When the Bolsheviks seized power in Russia, he helped found the Narodnoye Dielo to opposed the policies and ideas of Lenin and Trotsky. In 1918, Ingerman was a delegate at the convention of the anti-Bolshevik Federation of Russian Organizations in America. He opposed the Socialist Party's anti-war stance in World War I, and was a strong interventionist during World War II.

Ingerman was among the first people to be admitted to the Emancipation of Labour while studying in Bern. In America, he was intensively active in the socialist movement and worked to link the Russian, German, and Jewish immigrant groups with the native American socialists. He was a founder of the Russian Social Democratic Society. He edited a German weekly paper in the late 1890s that opposed De Leonism. He opposed the Anarcho-Syndicalist "deviation," and when Bolshevism began to split the Socialist Party in 1919 he continued to fight it, as he had been doing for over a decade beforehand. He was a delegate to the 1900 International Socialist Congress in Paris. When the Socialist Party was split by the expulsion of democratic and "orthodox" elements in the 1936 convention in Cleveland, he joined the Social Democratic Federation. He was a founder of the Rand School in 1906 and served as a member of its board of director for several years. He attended a directors' meeting of the school three days before his death.

In the 1914 United States House of Representatives election, Ingerman was the Socialist candidate in New York's 19th congressional district. He lost the election to Progressive and Independence League candidate Walter M. Chandler.

In 1890, Ingerman married Anna Amitin. They had one child, Dr. Eugenia. His son-in-law Bela Low was a metallurgical expert for the War Production Board, and his grandson was Francis Low.

Ingerman died in Beth David Hospital from a stroke on February 18, 1943. He completed his memoir shortly before his death. Raphael Abramovitch, Abraham Cahan, Viktor Chernov, Algernon Lee, and Friedrich Stampfer spoke at his funeral.
