= Christopher Marte =

American politician (born 1989)

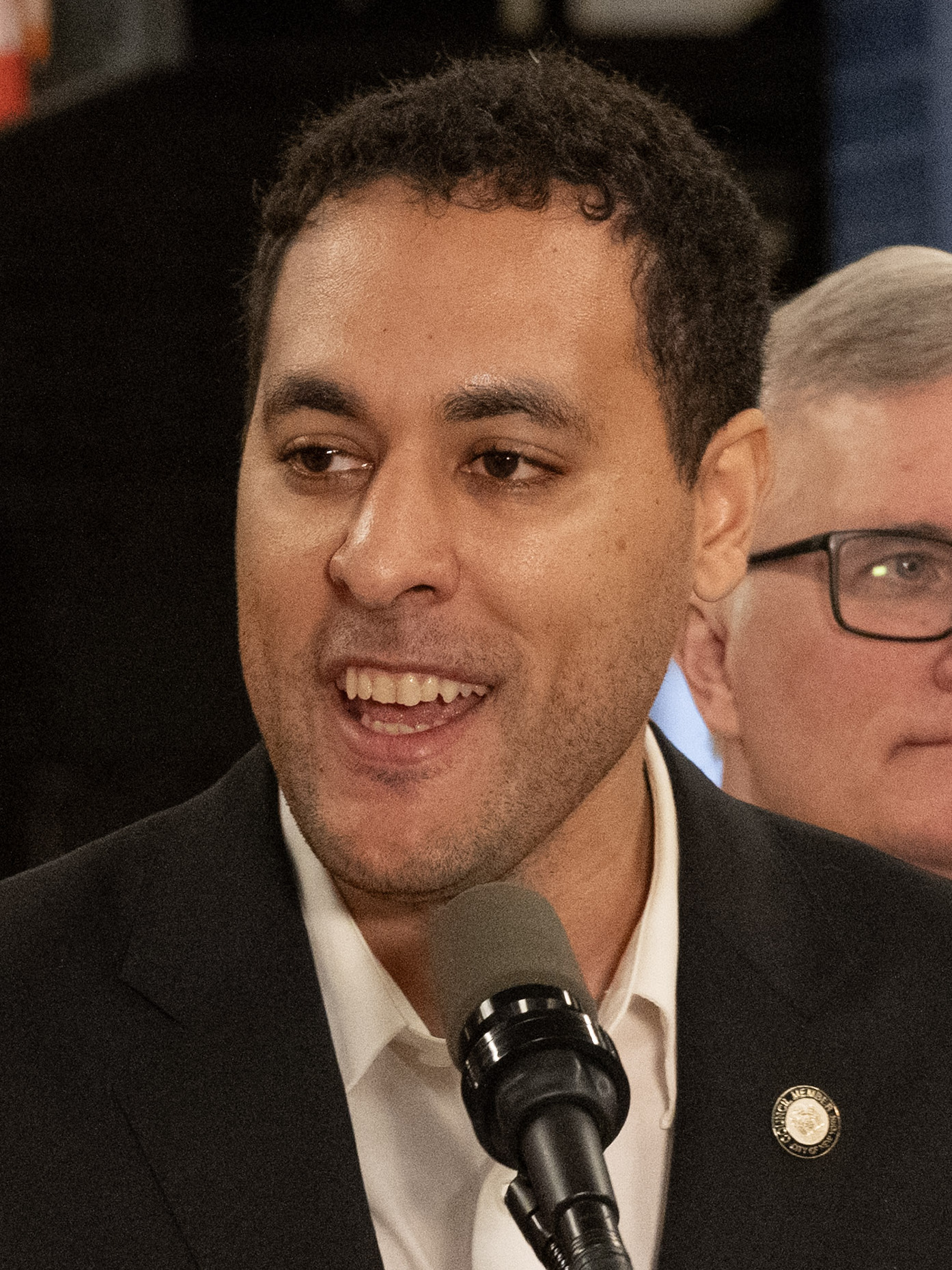
- Marte in 2025

Member of the New York City Council from the 1st district
- Incumbent
- Assumed office January 1, 2022
- Preceded by: Margaret Chin

Personal details
- Born: April 26, 1989 (age 37) New York City, New York, U.S.
- Party: Democratic
- Education: Long Island University, Global (BA)
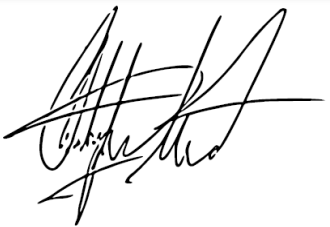
- Signature

Christopher Marte (born April 26, 1989) is an American politician who is a member of the New York City Council for the 1st district, elected in November 2021. He is a member of the Democratic Party.

His district includes Chinatown, the Lower East Side, the Financial District, Tribeca, Battery Park City, Little Italy, Governors Island, Hudson Square, and SoHo.

== Early life and education ==
Marte was born and raised on the Lower East Side of Manhattan. His father owned a bodega and his mother worked in a factory. Marte's parents immigrated from the Dominican Republic. He attended St. Agnes Boys High School and earned a Bachelor of Arts degree in international economics and politics from LIU Global.

== Career ==
After graduating from college, Marte worked in finance for IBM. Marte continued his work in finance, serving on the Young Professionals Board of Defy Ventures. Here, he assisted formerly incarcerated people with entrepreneurship. Later, Marte worked as a legal researcher at an immigration law firm. He then joined Arena, a Democratic-affiliated political action committee that trains candidates and campaign staffers. He later co-founded Neighbors United Below Canal, a non-profit organization.

== New York City Council ==
Marte ran for City Council in 2017, losing narrowly to incumbent Margaret Chin. He ran again in the 2021 Council elections, which were the first New York City elections to use ranked-choice voting. In the Democratic primary, Marte won 34.9% of the votes in the first round of voting and 60.5% of the votes in the final round. Marte won 72.1% of the vote in the general election.

In 2023, Marte voted against a proposal to allow outdoor dining structures created during the COVID-19 pandemic to become permanent.

In 2025, Marte's campaign website allegedly falsely claimed that he was endorsed by groups that had not officially endorsed his campaign. The same year, Marte was criticized after video footage allegedly depicted Marte removing an opponent’s flyer from in front of an apartment. Later that same year, Marte won the Democratic primary election, and the general election during the 2025 New York City Council election.

In March 2026, Steven Wong was fired from Marte's team for verbally harassing a female Chinese journalist.

In August 2026, Marte was accused of instructing a government staffer in his office to fundraise for his campaign and an affiliated Independent Expenditure (IE) group, in violation of ethics and campaign finance laws. The complainant also alleged that Marte's office attempted to terminate her upon her initial objection to being directed to fundraise for his campaign and the related IE, but relented after the Association of Legislative Employees stepped in on behalf of the staffer.

=== Housing ===
During his campaign for the City Council, Marte criticized incumbent council member Chin for voting to upzone NoHo and SoHo to permit 3,500 additional apartments, including 900 affordable housing units.

In 2022, Marte filed a lawsuit to prevent the construction of four tower developments in Lower Manhattan.

In December 2024, Marte voted against City of Yes, legislation to rezone parts of New York City to allow for the conversion and construction of 80,000 new housing units across the city over a 15-year period. Marte was the only councilmember representing a district in Manhattan to do so. He argued that the proposal was lacking a meaningful guarantee of new affordable housing, relying instead on incentives which do little historically to increase the affordable housing stock.

== Electoral history ==
=== 2025 ===
2025 New York City Council Democratic primary, District 1
Party	Candidate	Maximum round	Maximum votes	Share in maximum round	Maximum votes First round votes Transfer votes
Democratic	Christopher Marte	5	13,594	61.9%	
Democratic	Elizabeth Lewinsohn	5	8,372	38.1%	
Democratic	Jess Coleman	4	4,420	18.9%	
Democratic	Eric Yu	2	2,464	10.1%	
Write-In		1	120	0.5%	

2025 New York City Council election, District 1
Party	Candidate	Votes	%
Democratic	Christopher Marte	29,027	61.4
Working Families	Christopher Marte	4,839	10.2
Total	Christopher Marte (incumbent)	33,866	71.6
Republican	Helen Qiu	12,118	25.6
Conservative	Helen Qiu	1,120	2.4
Total	Helen Qiu	13,238	28.0
Write-in		179	0.4
Total votes		47,283	100.0
Democratic hold			

=== 2023 ===
2023 New York City Council Democratic primary, District 1
Party	Candidate	Votes	%
Democratic	Christopher Marte (incumbent)	5,485	62.6
Democratic	Susan Lee	2,707	30.9
Democratic	Ursila Jung	441	5.0
Democratic	Pooi Steward	97	1.1
Write-in		31	0.4
Total votes		8,761	100.0

2023 New York City Council election, District 1
Party	Candidate	Votes	%
Democratic	Christopher Marte (incumbent)	9,038	68.1
Republican	Helen Qiu (Note: Shared with "Common Sense" ballot line.)	3,661	27.6
Conservative	Helen Qiu (Note: Shared with "Arts & Culture" ballot line.)	441	3.3
Total	Helen Qiu	4,102	30.9
Write-in		123	0.9
Total votes		13,263	100.0
Democratic hold			

=== 2021 ===
2021 New York City Council Democratic primary, District 1
Party	Candidate	Maximum round	Maximum votes	Share in maximum round	Maximum votes First round votes Transfer votes
Democratic	Christopher Marte	8	10,785	60.5%	
Democratic	Jenny L. Low	8	7,054	39.5%	
Democratic	Gigi Li	7	4,662	23.9%	
Democratic	Maud Maron	5	2,495	12.1%	
Democratic	Susan Lee	4	2,020	9.6%	
Democratic	Sean C. Hayes	3	928	4.3%	
Democratic	Tiffany Johnson-Winbush	3	809	3.7%	
Democratic	Susan Damplo	2	344	1.6%	
Democratic	Denny R. Salas	2	292	1.3%	
Write-In		1	43	0.2%	

2021 New York City Council election, District 1
Party	Candidate	Votes	%
Democratic	Christopher Marte	16,733	72.1
Independent NY	Maud Maron	3,265	14.1
Republican	Jacqueline Toboroff	3,166	13.6
Write-in		48	0.2
Total votes		23,212	100.0
Democratic hold			

=== 2017 ===
2017 New York City Council Democratic primary, District 1
Party	Candidate	Votes	%
Democratic	Margaret Chin (incumbent)	5,363	45.8
Democratic	Christopher Marte	5,141	43.9
Democratic	Aaron Foldenauer	734	6.3
Democratic	Dashia Imperiale	459	3.9
Write-in		22	0.2
Total votes		11,719	100.0

2017 New York City Council election, District 1
Party	Candidate	Votes	%
Democratic	Margaret Chin	10,963	45.9
Working Families	Margaret Chin	942	3.9
Total	Margaret Chin (incumbent)	11,905	49.9
Independence	Christopher Marte	8,753	36.7
Republican	Bryan Jung	2,111	8.8
Liberal	Aaron Foldenauer	1,059	4.4
Write-in		33	0.1
Total votes		23,861	100.0
Democratic hold			
