= Tara Sutton =

Canadian journalist and filmmaker

Tara Sutton is a Canadian journalist and filmmaker whose work in conflict zones has received many awards. She was one of the first international television correspondents to both produce and shoot their own reports and is a pioneer in the field of "video journalism".

She was the only unembedded television reporter to enter Fallujah Iraq during the siege of the city during the first battle of Fallujah in 2004. She snuck into the city disguised in a veil and made a controversial film that aired on Channel 4 News. The film documented human rights abuses and war crimes and was awarded the Amnesty Media Awards for television news in 2005. Previously she had spent months in Fallujah documenting the rise of the insurgency, often living at Fallujah hospital for safety. Her report for BBC Newsnight was the first to suggest that Iraqi prisoners were being tortured, months before the Abu Ghraib scandal broke.

She has twice been a finalist for the Rory Peck Awards, which honor bravery by cameramen in war zones.

She has reported from Iraq, Afghanistan, Jordan, Darfur, Cambodia, Pakistan, Cuba, Liberia, Colombia, Uganda, Kenya, Ethiopia. She is freelance and her work appears on BBC Newsnight, Channel 4 News, CBC, Channel One, PBS, Discovery, Al Jazeera and The Guardian. Her writing appears in The Guardian and The New Yorker.

== Personal life ==
The journalist was a close friend of the humanitarian Marla Ruzicka who died in Iraq in 2005. Marla left CIVIC, the organization she founded to Tara Sutton in her will, asking her to take care of it and appoint a new executive director.

She attended St Mary's School, Calne a boarding school in Wiltshire, England and the Columbia University Graduate School of Journalism in New York, and University of Toronto.
