= Marla Ruzicka =

American activist

- Born: December 31, 1976; Lakeport, California, U.S.
- Died: April 16, 2005 (aged 28); Baghdad Airport Road, Baghdad, Iraq
- Education: Friends World Program
- Occupation: Founder of Campaign for Innocent Victims in Conflict (CIVIC)

Marla Ruzicka (December 31, 1976 – April 16, 2005) was an American activist-turned-aid worker. She believed that combatant governments had a legal and moral responsibility to compensate the families of civilians killed or injured in military conflicts.

In 2003, Ruzicka founded the Campaign for Innocent Victims in Conflict (CIVIC), an organization that counted civilian casualties and assisted Iraqi victims of the 2003 U.S. invasion of Iraq. In 2005, she was killed in a suicide car bombing explosion in Iraq.

== Early life and education ==
Born in Lakeport, California, Ruzicka attended Long Island University's Friends World Program, and spent four years traveling throughout Costa Rica, Kenya, Cuba, Israel, and Zimbabwe. After graduating in 1999, Ruzicka volunteered for the San Francisco-based organizations Rainforest Action Network and Global Exchange.

== Afghanistan and Iraq ==
Prior to launching CIVIC in Iraq, she was based in Peshawar, Pakistan, and later Kabul, Afghanistan. Under the auspices of Global Exchange, she pressured the US government to set up a fund for Afghan families harmed in Operation Enduring Freedom. However, she soon struck out on her own to form CIVIC, and arrived in Kabul only a few days after the Taliban were removed from power. In Afghanistan, she began conducting a grassroots survey on the military campaign effects on Afghan civilians, in order to apply for compensation and aid. On April 7, 2002, she protested outside the U.S. Embassy in Kabul, alongside several civilians who had lost relatives as the result of U.S. air strikes.

In July 2002, Ruzicka began working with USAID and the Senate Appropriations Committee to allocate money to rebuild the homes of families that had suffered losses as a result of military action. After receiving CIVIC's first report, Senator Patrick Leahy (D-Vermont) sponsored legislation to provide $10 million in U.S. aid to Afghan civilians who had been harmed by the US military. He said, "Marla Ruzicka is out there saying, 'Wait, everybody. Here is what is really happening. You'd better know about this.' We have whistle blowers in industry. Maybe sometimes we need whistle blowers in foreign policy."

She traveled to Baghdad after the March 2003 U.S. invasion. CIVIC's efforts were featured on Nightline and CNN, as well as in The New York Times and Elle magazine. "With a shoestring budget, almost no staff and a bundle of energy, Ruzicka has already had more impact on more lives than many seasoned K Street lobbyists," The Washington Post reported in 2004. Ruzicka was diagnosed with bipolar disorder in the summer of 2004.

Ruzicka’s early work in Afghanistan was shaped in part by an informal and unorthodox approach to journalism and advocacy. Reporters who encountered her in Kabul often remembered her as energetic, sociable, and unconventional, noting that she relied heavily on personal networks to advance her research. She developed a reputation within the expatriate press community for organizing social gatherings, maintaining extensive personal connections, and using those relationships to secure transportation, translators, and access to remote areas. Without a formal institutional role, she improvised one for herself, traveling widely to meet Afghan families affected by the conflict and gathering testimony to document civilian harm.

Her later efforts in Washington similarly reflected a direct and improvisational style. Former colleagues recalled that she approached congressional offices without prior experience in government relations, sometimes even rollerblading through Senate hallways. Despite her lack of formal training, she was described as fearless and driven by a belief that civilian losses demanded practical solutions rather than symbolic protest. Her interactions with U.S. military personnel also evolved over time; although rooted in anti-war activism, she came to view cooperation with individual service members as essential to securing assistance for war-affected families. Ruzicka herself later stated that her views had shifted through fieldwork, leading her to focus less on opposing war in principle and more on reducing its impact on civilians.

=== Death ===
Ruzicka and her Iraqi translator, Faiz Ali Salim, were killed by a suicide car bombing on the Baghdad Airport Road on April 16, 2005. More than 600 people attended her funeral in her hometown of Lakeport; Barbara Boxer and Sean Penn were among those who spoke at her memorial service. There were also memorial services in New York City, Washington, D.C., Baghdad, Kabul, and San Francisco.

According to Rolling Stone, "Ruzicka is perhaps the most famous American aid worker to die in any conflict of the past ten or twenty years. Though a novice in life—she had less than four years of professional humanitarian experience—her death resonated far beyond the tightly knit group of war junkies and policymakers who knew her. She stands as a youthful representative of a certain kind of not-yet-lost American idealism, and darkly symbolic of what has gone so tragically wrong in Iraq."

Marla Ruzicka left a one line will stating that her friend, war journalist Tara Sutton, would take care of CIVIC and appoint a new director.

At Senator Leahy's urging, President George W. Bush signed legislation on May 11, 2005, which renamed the civilian war victims the "Marla Ruzicka Iraqi War Victims Fund." As of 2006, the combined sum that Congress has allocated to assist Afghan and Iraqi civilians who were victims of U.S. warfare is thirty-eight million dollars.

== Depiction in film media ==
Film rights to Ruzicka's life story were purchased by Paramount Pictures. The studio also bought the rights to the book Sweet Relief: The Marla Ruzicka Story by Jennifer Abrahamson, who had begun collaborating on the book with Ruzicka before her death. Kirsten Dunst agreed to play Ruzicka in the movie scripted by Lorene Scafaria.

Ruzicka appears briefly in the documentary Enron: The Smartest Guys in the Room as one of the protesters who disrupts Jeffrey Skilling's speech at The Commonwealth Club.
