= Maud Maron =

American politician

Personal details
- Born: 1970 or 1971 (age 55–56) New York City, New York, U.S.
- Party: Republican (2023–present); Democratic (before 2023)
- Spouse: Juan Pablo
- Education: Barnard College (BA); Cardozo School of Law (JD)

Maud Maron (born 1970/1971) is an American activist and former public defender from New York City. Formerly a Democrat, she has run for multiple offices as both a Democrat and Republican, including most recently in the 2025 Manhattan District Attorney race against incumbent Alvin Bragg. She is a former president of the New York City Community Education Council District 2.

In 2019, Maron co-founded Parent Leaders for Accelerated Curriculum and Education NYC (PLACE NYC) to oppose Mayor Bill De Blasio's plans to widen access to selective middle and high schools. She co-founded the New York City Chapter of the Foundation Against Intolerance and Racism and served as its interim executive director in 2023.

In 2021, Maron ran unsuccessfully for the 1st City Council district. She has previously contested both the 10th and 12th congressional districts in New York.

== Activism ==
=== PLACE NYC ===
In 2019, Maron and Yiatin Chu formed Parent Leaders for Accelerated Curriculum and Education NYC (PLACE NYC) to oppose Bill de Blasio's attempts to shift away from screened middle and high schools. Maron served as co-president. PLACE argues that the city's schools are failing their students, that the city should redouble its focus on academics, and that racism does not contribute to the city's underperforming schools. Other parental groups have described it as shifting rightward. In October 2023, Maron stepped down as co-president of PLACE.

City comptroller Brad Lander launched an investigation into the group and found that it had violated city rules by improperly endorsing its own members in last spring's elections.

=== Community Education Council District 2 ===
From 2019 to 2020, Maron was president of the Community Education Council (CEC) for District 2. In 2019, the student organization Teens Take Charge rallied against NYC's segregated school system. The group called on Maron to resign from the CEC following her criticism of the city's proposals for a more culturally diverse curriculum and implicit bias training. At the October 2020 meeting of CEC 2, Maron was removed as President of the council by a vote of 6 - 5. In 2023 Maron was elected to CEC 2 again by a margin of 1/2 vote.

In June 2024, the chancellor removed her from the council following her calling an anonymous student who authored a pro-Palestinian op-ed in the school paper a coward. She was let back in three months later after an appeal. In 2025, Maron ran again for a seat on the CEC and lost the election.

=== Stuyvesant School Leadership Team ===
As of March 2024, a petition to remove Maron from the School Leadership Team of Stuyvesant High School has gained over 700 signatures. It was circulated after she was quoted in a New York Post article calling an anonymous student author a "coward" guilty of "Jew hatred" and calling for their name to be public for their op-ed.

=== Legal Aid Society ===
Maron worked as a Senior Staff Attorney for the Legal Aid Society. In July 2020, Maron wrote an opinion piece critical of a NYC DOE anti-bias training session. The Black Attorneys of Legal Aid caucus released a tweet criticizing the piece and stating "It is obvious to anyone with any sense of racial justice that Maud is racist and openly so". The Legal Aid Society's official Twitter account retweeted it. Maron sued the LAS, stating her colleagues had unfairly labeled her a racist, but lost the lawsuit.

=== Foundation Against Intolerance and Racism ===
In 2021, Maron and Yiatin Chu co-founded the New York City Chapter of the Foundation Against Intolerance and Racism, which advocates against Critical Race Theory and advocates a "human first" mindset critics have likened to "All Lives Matter". In 2023 Maron served as interim executive director of FAIR following internal power struggles in the organization.

=== Moms for Liberty ===
Members of PLACE have allegedly promoted local chapters of Moms for Liberty in their private discussion forums and Moms for Liberty has praised PLACE. In January 2024, Maron spoke at a panel organized by Moms for Liberty, whom she has described as "one of the more dynamic and genuinely diverse parents groups to emerge from the school closure era". Maron told the New York Daily News she was not a member of Moms for Liberty, and in a statement the organization confirmed Maron was not a member. When speaking to Gay City News, Maron stated "I am, at this point, a member of Moms for Liberty, yes I am." The flyer for the event listed her affiliation with the educational council but did not issue a disclaimer that the views expressed were her own. Maron was criticized at a District 2 CEC meeting for her participation in the Thursday panel. At the meeting, she described a protester identifying herself as a "proud queer woman" as "a straight girl without a boyfriend", drawing criticism.

== Political campaigns ==
=== 2021 District 1 City Council election ===
In 2021 she ran in the Democratic primary for the New York City's 1st City Council district with endorsements from the Uniformed Sanitationmen's Association and Police Benevolent Association, stating her priorities would be to get schools fully reopened and prevent the opening of a new jail in Chinatown. She stated she favors Kathryn Garcia and Eric Adams for Mayor. The campaign was unsuccessful and she continued to run as an independent. In November, she won 14% of the vote and lost to Christopher Marte.

2021 New York City Council election
Party	Candidate	Maximum round	Maximum votes	Share in maximum round	Maximum votes First round votes Transfer votes
Democratic	Christopher Marte	8	10,785	60.5%	
Democratic	Jenny Low	8	7,054	39.5%	
Democratic	Gigi Li	6	4,662	23.9%	
Democratic	Maud Maron	5	2,495	12.1%	
Democratic	Susan Lee	4	2,020	9.6%	
Democratic	Sean Hayes	3	928	4.3%	
Democratic	Tiffany Johnson-Winbush	3	809	3.7%	
Democratic	Susan Damplo	2	344	1.6%	
Democratic	Denny Salas	2	292	1.3%	

2021 New York City Council election, District 1 general election
Party	Candidate	Votes	%
Democratic	Christopher Marte	16,733	72.1
Independent NY	Maud Maron	3,265	14.0
Republican	Jacqueline Toboroff	3,166	13.6
Total votes		23,212	100

=== 2022 Congressional District elections ===
In 2022, Maron ran against Carolyn Maloney in the Democratic Primary for New York's 12th Congressional District. During her campaign, she raised concerns about the inclusion of transgender women in college athletics, stating "Now, any dude who feels like a woman is supposed to be treated like a woman. That's absurd".

Maron also ran in the Democratic Primary for the 10th Congressional district, calling for revisions to the Biden administration's proposed updates to Title IX and exclusion of transgender people from women's athletics and "single sex spaces". Maron stated the policies would one of her top issues if she were elected, arguing that the inclusion of protections for gender identity will do "real damage to girls and women". Maron lost with 1% of the vote.

2022 New York's 10th congressional district Democratic primary
Party	Candidate	Votes	%
Democratic	Dan Goldman	16,686	25.8
Democratic	Yuh-Line Niou	15,380	23.7
Democratic	Mondaire Jones (incumbent) (Note: Due to redistricting, Mondaire Jones decided to move to NY-10, which is not connected by territory to his home district of NY-17.)	11,777	18.2
Democratic	Carlina Rivera	10,985	17.0
Democratic	Jo Anne Simon	3,991	6.2
Democratic	Elizabeth Holtzman	2,845	4.4
Democratic	Jimmy Li	777	1.2
Democratic	Yan Xiong	686	1.1
Democratic	Maud Maron	578	0.9
Democratic	Bill de Blasio (withdrawn)	477	0.7
Democratic	Brian Robinson	322	0.5
Democratic	Peter Gleason	147	0.2
Democratic	Quanda Francis	121	0.2
Total votes		64,772	100.0

== Views ==
Maron describes herself a former liberal. The New York Times has described her as a conservative activist.

=== Race ===
Maron argues that Critical Race Theory has influenced how teachers educate their students, though CRT is not taught in the city's public schools, and that extended classroom discussions on race are unnecessary.

=== COVID-19 policies ===
Maron has opposed mask mandates in public schools.

=== Transgender students ===
Maron supports policies that would ban transgender children in schools from using bathrooms or playing on sports teams congruent with their gender identity.

Maron has described city schools as an "oppressor woke environment where DOE employees make them pledge allegiance to their LGBTQI+ religion". Parents and teachers called for her removal from the CEC District 2 board following a story published by The 74 which revealed private texts in which Maron stated "there is no such thing as trans kids" and "the social contagion is undeniable" when replying to a parent's concerns about the number of LGBTQ+ youth in their child's school. A DOE spokesperson called the comments "despicable and not in line with our values". In February, Maron led a resolution urging Eric Adams's education officials to restrict transgender girls' athletic participation.

== Personal life ==
Maron was born in Manhattan and lived in Pennsylvania before returning to Manhattan in the 1980s to attend Barnard College. She taught at the Cardozo School of Law from 2003 to 2005.

Maron is a mother of four. She is married to Juan Pablo and has lived in District 1 for the last 20 years. She is a convert to Judaism.

== See also ==
- LGBT grooming conspiracy theory
