= 2025 Manhattan District Attorney election =

- November 4, 2025
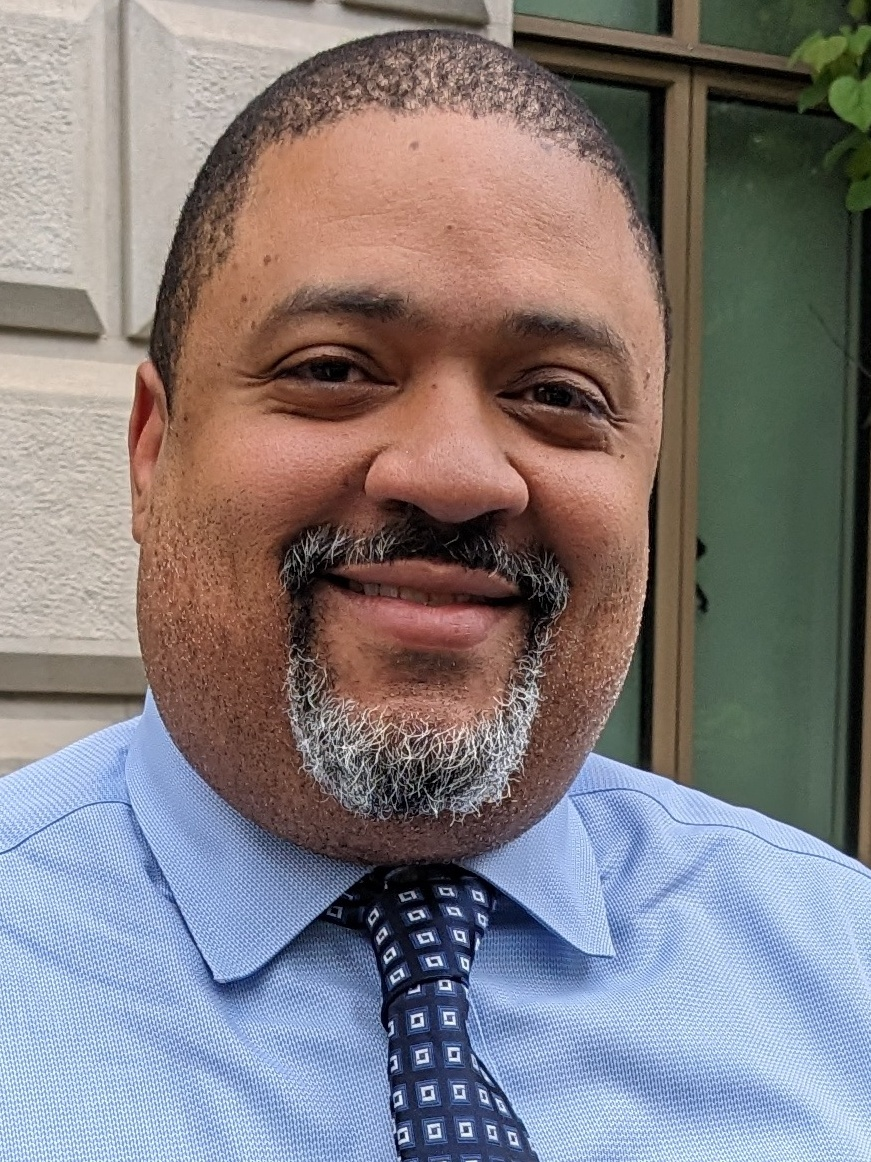

Candidate	Alvin Bragg	Maud Maron	Diana J. Florence
Party	Democratic	Republican	Independent
Alliance	Working Families	Conservative
Popular vote	358,925	100,202	26,857
Percentage	73.9%	20.6%	5.5%
- Unofficial results by state assembly district
District Attorney before election
Alvin Bragg
Democratic
Elected District Attorney
Alvin Bragg
Democratic

The 2025 Manhattan District Attorney election was held on November 4, 2025, to elect the Manhattan District Attorney. The Democratic primary was held on June 24. The Republican Party did not hold a primary as only one candidate, Maud Maron, sought the nomination. Incumbent Alvin Bragg was re-elected with just under three-quarters of the vote.

== Democratic primary ==
=== Candidates ===
==== Nominee ====
- Alvin Bragg, incumbent district attorney

==== Eliminated in primary ====
- Patrick Timmins, civil litigator and prosecutor

=== Campaign ===
Timmins campaigned against Bragg's handling of crime in the county. Bragg's campaign rejected the idea that crime has risen, as crime rates among the seven felonies (Note: i.e. murders, rapes, robberies, felony assaults, burglaries, grand larcenies and grand larcenies of automobiles) that the New York City Police Department uses to measure crime rate are 13% lower in 2025 than the rates across a similar time period in 2022 were.

=== Endorsements ===
Alvin Bragg

U.S. representatives

- Adriano Espaillat, NY-13 (2017–present) and chair of the Congressional Hispanic Caucus (2025–present)
- Jerry Nadler, NY-12 (1992–present)
- Dan Goldman, NY-10 (2023–present)

Local officials

- Gale Brewer, former Manhattan Borough president (2014–2021) and city councilmember from the 6th district (2002–2013, 2022–present)
- C. Virginia Fields, former Manhattan Borough president (1998–2005)
- Ruth Messinger, former Manhattan Borough president (1990–1997) and nominee for mayor in 1997

Labor unions

- Laborers' International Union of North America
- N.Y.C. District Council of Carpenters
- 1199SEIU
- United Federation of Teachers
- District Council 37
- Retail, Wholesale and Department Store Union
- Communications Workers of America Local 1180

Organizations

- Everytown for Gun Safety
- New Yorkers Against Gun Violence

Political parties

- Working Families Party

=== Polling ===
Poll source	Date(s) administered	Sample size (Note: Key: A – all adults RV – registered voters LV – likely voters V – unclear)	Margin of error	Alvin Bragg	Patrick Timmins	Undecided
Beacon Research (Note: Poll sponsored by Bragg's campaign.)	April 9–13, 2025	568 (LV)	—N/a	58%	18%	24%

=== Results ===
Democratic primary
Party	Candidate	Votes	%
Democratic	Alvin Bragg (incumbent)	194,798	73.6%
Democratic	Patrick Timmins	68,930	26.0%
Write-in		887	0.3%
Total votes		264,615	100.00%

==== By precinct ====

Bragg

50–60%
60–70%
70–80%
80–90%
90–100%

Timmins

50–60%

Other

40–50% tie
No votes

== Republican nomination ==
=== Candidates ===
==== Nominee ====
- Maud Maron, candidate for New York City Council in 2021 and candidate for United States House of Representatives in 2022

== Third parties and independents ==
=== Working Families Party ===
==== Nominee ====
- Alvin Bragg, incumbent district attorney

=== Conservative Party ===
==== Nominee ====
- Maud Maron, candidate for New York City Council in 2021 and candidate for United States House of Representatives in 2022

=== Independents ===
==== Declared ====
- Diana J. Florence, attorney and Democratic candidate in the 2021 election (Note: While Florence is a registered Democrat, she is running as an independent under the third-party ballot line 'A Safer Manhattan'.)

== General election ==
=== Post-primary endorsements ===
Alvin Bragg (D)

Labor unions

- Communications Workers of America District 1

Organizations

- Manhattan Democratic Party
Maud Maron (R)

Individuals

- Madeline Brame, State Director of Blexit NY

Organizations

- New York Young Republican Club
- Log Cabin Republicans of New York City
- Metropolitan Republican Club

Newspapers

- New York Post
Diana Florence (I)

Individuals

- James Dolan, owner of the New York Knicks

=== Debate ===
2025 Manhattan district attorney election debate
No.	Date	Host	Moderator	Link	Democratic	Republican	Independent
Key: P Participant A Absent N Not invited I Invited W Withdrawn							
Key: P Participant A Absent N Not invited I Invited W Withdrawn					Alvin Bragg	Maud Maron	Diane Florence
1	Oct. 24, 2025	NY1	Errol Louis	NY1	P	P	P

=== Results ===
2025 Manhattan District Attorney election
Party	Candidate	Votes	%	±%
Democratic	Alvin Bragg	310,228	63.75%	–12.1%
Working Families	Alvin Bragg	48,697	10.01%	
Total	Alvin Bragg (incumbent)	358,925	73.75%	–2.05%
Republican	Maud Maron	91,671	18.84%	+4.08%
Conservative	Maud Maron	8,531	1.75%	
Total	Maud Maron	100,202	20.59%	+5.83%
A Safer Manhattan	Diana J. Florence	26,857	5.52%	
Write-in		686	0.14%	–0.02%
Total votes		486,670	100.00%	

== Notes ==
Partisan clients
