= Frank Fossella =

American politician and land developer

Member of the New York City Council from the 1st district
- In office January 1, 1985 – December 31, 1985
- Preceded by: Nicholas LaPorte
- Succeeded by: Susan Molinari

Personal details
- Born: November 6, 1925 Bayonne, New Jersey, U.S.
- Died: August 18, 2014 (aged 88) South Beach, Staten Island, New York, U.S.
- Party: Democratic
- Education: Brooklyn Polytechnic Institute

Frank Vincent Fossella (November 6, 1925 – August 18, 2014) was an American politician and land developer. He was of Italian descent.

== Life and career ==
Frank Fossella represented parts of Staten Island as a member of the New York City Council in 1985. Mr. Fossella was a member of the Democratic Party, and was uncle to former Republican member of the United States House of Representatives Vito Fossella.

Political offices
Preceded by Nicholas LaPorte	Member of the New York City Council from the 1st district 1985	Succeeded by Susan Molinari
