= Alfred C. Cerullo III =

American politician

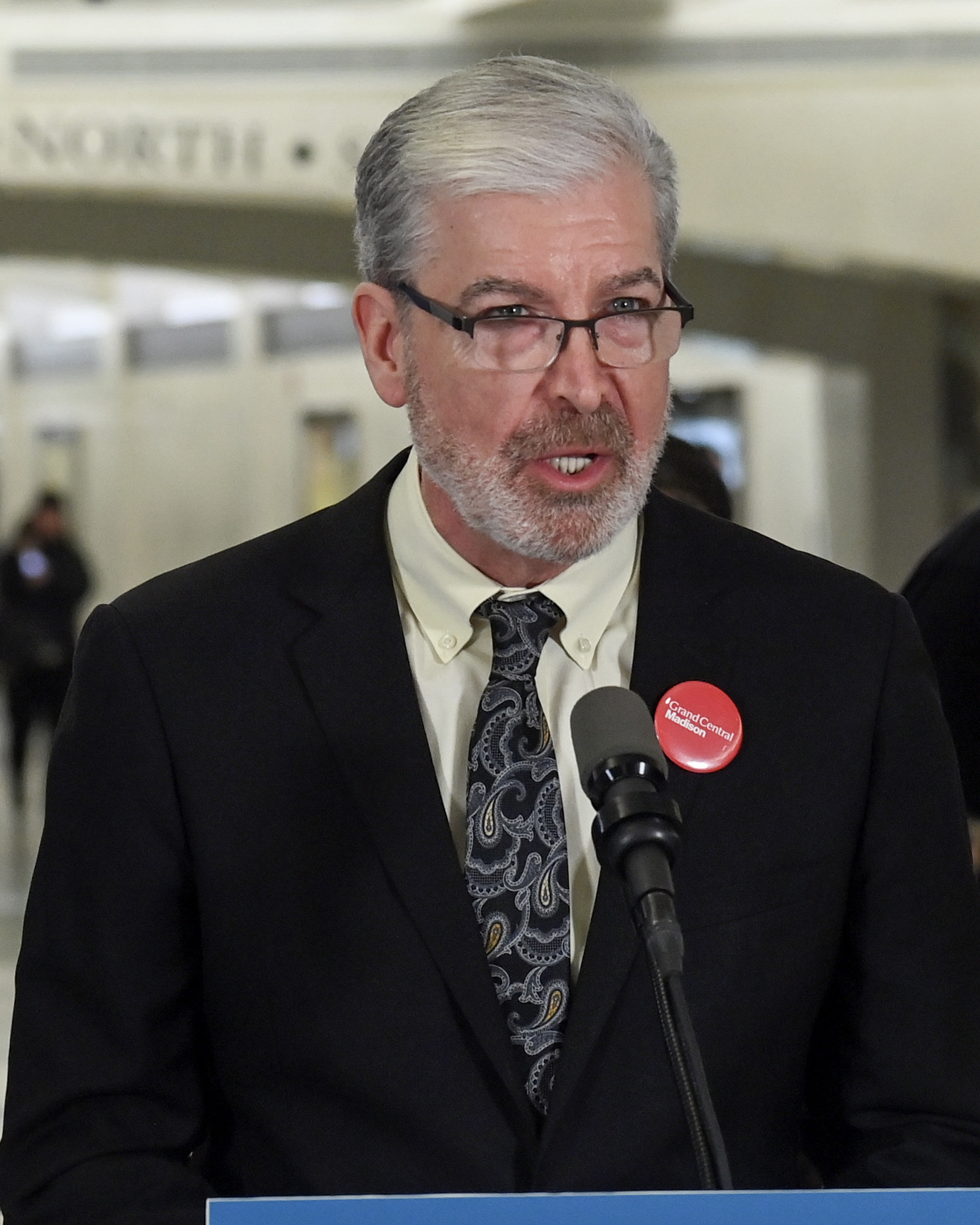

Commissioner of the New York City Department of Finance
- In office December 1995 – January 1999
- Appointed by: Rudy Giuliani
- Preceded by: Joe Lhota
- Succeeded by: Andrew Sidamon-Eristoff

Commissioner of the New York City Department of Consumer Affairs
- In office February 1994 – December 1995
- Appointed by: Rudy Giuliani
- Preceded by: Mark Green
- Succeeded by: Jose Maldonado

Minority Leader of the New York City Council
- In office 1990–1994
- Preceded by: Susan Molinari
- Succeeded by: Michael Abel

Member of the New York City Council from the 51st district
- In office January 1, 1992 – February 28, 1994
- Preceded by: New district
- Succeeded by: Vito Fossella

Member of the New York City Council from the 1st district
- In office May 16, 1990 – January 1, 1992
- Preceded by: Susan Molinari
- Succeeded by: Kathryn E. Freed

Personal details
- Born: December 16, 1961 (age 64)
- Parent(s): Alfred C. Cerullo Jr. Elizabeth (Russo) Cerullo
- Education: St. John's University; St. John's University School of Law

Alfred Carmine "Fred" Cerullo III (born December 16, 1961) is an actor and former Republican Party official from Staten Island, New York City, who has held many local leadership positions.

== Early life ==
Alfred III was born on December 16, 1961, in Brooklyn to Alfred C. Cerullo Jr. and the former Elizabeth Russo. He was raised in the Great Kills neighborhood of Staten Island in New York City, and is the nephew of Oscar-nominated actress Patty McCormack.

He received a Bachelor's Degree in English and American Studies from St. John's University and his law degree from St. John's University School of Law.

== Political career ==
In 1990 he was elected to the New York City Council as the only seated Republican, which made him the minority leader. He left that position to become Commissioner of the New York City Department of Consumer Affairs in 1994, and in 1995 was appointed Commissioner of the New York City Department of Finance. He left office in 1999.

== After politics ==
He has been president of the Grand Central Partnership since 1999, and for many years has acted in theater and television. Cerullo had a recurring role on the soap opera One Life to Live and prior to that he had guest appearances on a number of soap operas.

== Electoral history ==
=== 1993 ===
1993 New York City Council election, District 51
Party	Candidate	Votes	%
Republican	Alfred C. Cerullo III	35,512	77.5
Conservative	Alfred C. Cerullo III	3,268	7.1
Total	Alfred C. Cerullo III (incumbent)	38,780	84.6
Democratic	Rosemarie Mangano	5,868	12.8
Right to Life	Janet Morana	1,178	2.6
Total votes		45,826	100.0
Republican hold			

=== 1991 ===
1991 New York City Council election, District 51
Party	Candidate	Votes	%
Republican	Alfred C. Cerullo III (incumbent)	12,188	78.2
Democratic	John M. Petrofsky	3,154	20.2
Liberal	William Cole	236	1.5
Total votes		15,578	100.0
Republican hold			

=== 1990 ===
1990 New York City's 1st City Council District special election
Party	Candidate	Votes	%
Unknown ballot line	Alfred C. Cerullo III	3,146	27.2
Unknown ballot line	Ralph J. Molinari	3,035	26.2
Unknown ballot line	Eleanor T. Conforti	2,610	22.6
Unknown ballot line	William C. Codd	1,409	12.2
Unknown ballot line	Dennis J. Sarlo	650	5.6
Unknown ballot line	Annmarie T. Joseph	517	4.5
Unknown ballot line	Dennis Paperman	203	1.8
Total votes		11,570	100.0
Republican hold			

1990 New York City Council minority leader election
Party	Candidate	Votes	%
Republican	Alfred C. Cerullo III (District 1)	1 (Note: The one vote for Cerullo was cast by Cerullo himself.)	100.0
Total votes		1	100.0
Votes necessary		1	>50.0

1990 New York City Council election, District 1
Party	Candidate	Votes	%
Republican	Alfred C. Cerullo III	16,818	40.3
Conservative	Alfred C. Cerullo III	6,405	15.4
Total	Alfred C. Cerullo III (incumbent)	23,223	55.7
Democratic	Dennis Paperman	14,844	35.6
Staten Island Secession	Dennis Paperman	1,692	4.1
Total	Dennis Paperman	16,536	39.7
Right to Life	Marietta A. Canning	1,931	4.6
Total votes		41,690	100.0
Republican hold			
