= LIU Global =

Coordinates: 40°41′28″N 73°58′50″W

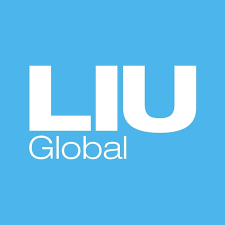
- Type: Private University
- Established: 1965
- Founder: Committee on Friends World College (affiliated with New York Quakers)
- Dean: Dr. Gregory W. Barton, Sarah Moran (Assistant Dean)
- Director: Sarah Moran (Costa Rica), Rainer Braun (Europe), Soenke Biermann (International Research & Internship Semester/Australia & Pacific)
- Location: Brooklyn, New York City, New York, U.S. Heredia, Costa Rica; London, England; Brussels, Belgium; Paris, France; Vienna, Austria; Dublin, Ireland; Edinburgh, Scotland; Byron Bay, Australia; Wellington, New Zealand; Suva, Fiji; Ubud, Bali
- Language: English; Spanish; German
- Mascot: Shark
- Website: www.liu.edu/global

LIU Global (formerly: Friends World College, Friends World Institute, Friends World Program, and Global College of Long Island University) is one of the Long Island University's schools that offers a four-year Global Studies degree program that sends students abroad to Latin America, Europe, and Australia.

Students travel with their own cohort for their entire four years abroad, gaining strong connections with fellow students as the program only allows up to 30 students every year.

== Academics ==
LIU Global offers only one degree, a B.A. in Global Studies.

Students from other LIU campuses and other universities can study abroad for a semester or year in one of LIU Global centers.

=== Year 1: Costa Rica ===
All freshmen are required to travel to the Costa Rica Center, based in Heredia, Costa Rica, just outside of the capital: San José, Costa Rica. Students spend their fall and spring semesters exploring "Central America's role in global dynamics, focusing on the region's history, cultures, politics, and ecosystems."

Along with their coursework, students also complete fieldwork and fieldtrips to locations like Térraba, Limón Province, and Panama. During these trips, "students analyze the local effects of globalization and the lasting impact of colonialism and African migration."

==== Required Courses: Fall Semester ====
- Foundation Year Orientation Seminar
- Latin American and Caribbean Studies Seminar
- Foundations of Global Studies: Environment & Ecology
- Joining the Conversation: The Argumentative Essay
- Beginner, Intermediate, or Advanced Communicative Spanish I

==== Required Courses: Spring Semester ====
- Foundations of Global Studies: Governance
- An Introduction to Field Research
- Exploring Questions: Writing the Research Paper I
- Beginner, Intermediate, or Advanced Communicative Spanish II

=== Year 2: Europe ===
In their second year, LIU Global gives "students an immersive experience in the cultural, political, and historical foundations of Europe." Students will be able to "explore the region's significant impact on global history while engaging in coursework, internships, and study travel."

Students study in the Europe Program which is based in Glasgow, Scotland in the fall, with field trips to Ireland and London where they will explore historical and contemporary influences of European governance, art, and culture. In their second semester, students will travel be based in Strasbourg, France and will finish in Bosnia & Herzegovina. Additionally students will also get to visit Austria, Belgium, and more to dive deeper into political landscapes and cultural traditions of the regions.

==== Courses: Fall Semester ====
- Local Approaches and Global Issues
- The Emergence of the Modern Nation State: From European Roots to Global Dominance
- Arts and Communications Elective
- International Relations in Practice: Modern Diplomacy at Work
- Foundations of Global Studies: Culture

==== Courses: Spring Semester ====
- Foundations of Global Studies: Politics
- Contemporary Perspectives on Gender in the World
- German Language & Culture
- Entrepreneurship Elective
- Careers & Professionalism

=== Year 3: Australia & the Pacific ===
In the third year, students will be with the Asia-Pacific Australia Program in Byron Bay, Australia, New Zealand, and Fiji in the fall exploring "how diverse communities and nations address the challenge of promoting economic development while protecting the planet's ecosystems." In the spring they'll be in Byron Bay, Australia and Bali focusing on the balance of cultural preservation and environmental sustainability with the impact of globalization.

==== Courses: Fall Semester ====
- Political Economy and Ecology in the Asia-Pacific
- Race, Power, and Indigeneity
- Introduction to International Development
- Global Studies Seminar
- Special Topics in: Global Studies, International relations, and Arts

==== Courses: Spring Semester ====
- Culture, Politics, and Identity in Australasia
- Australia's First Peoples
- Social Entrepreneurship
- Climate Change and Costal Management
- Multimedia Storytelling
- Special Topics in: Global Studies

=== Year 4: International Research and Internship Semester (IRIS) ===
Students spend their last year doing an International Research and Internship Semester (IRIS), a research project centered around an internship in the location and on the topic of the student's choice. Students and their director also design a self-directed learning plan which can consist of topics or language study.

==== Some Internship Locations Include ====
- LIU Center in Costa Rica
- LIU Center in Australia
- Spain
- Bali
- Germany
- Trinidad and Tobago
- Thailand
- Morocco

The last semester is spent at LIU Brooklyn in New York City, where students complete a series of capstone experiences, a second senior-year internship, and a senior thesis.

==== Semester Includes ====
1. Initial thesis research
2. A professional internship in Global Issues
3. A self-designed "special studies" program, developed with an advisor, to deepen academic and professional engagement with a global challenge (comparative to Sustainable Development Goals)

== Minors ==
Students who pursue a B.A. in Global Studies with LIU Global are able to choose from a collection of 3 minors:

1. Arts and Communications
2. Entrepreneurship
3. International Relations

Students are allowed to pursue more than one of these minors in their studies if they wish. though, its important to note that Global Studies students can only choose from these minors and no other minors from either the LIU Brooklyn campus or the LIU Post campus.

=== Arts and Communications ===
The Arts and Communications minor "provides students with essential skills in communication, preparing them to navigate the global media landscape."

The minor introduces "strategic communication fundamentals and contemporary media platforms", explore global fine art and popular culture, enhancing students' ability to incorporate diverse aesthetic traditions into communication strategies."

=== Entrepreneurship ===
The Entrepreneurship minor "equips students with the skills and knowledge to create sustainable ventures with social impact."

This minor allows students to "learn entrepreneurial design thinking to plan and execute ventures that address social needs." It encourages "practical experience through fieldwork, projects, and internships around the world" to have students "develop the skills needed for students to create change in both the professional and community settings."

=== International Relations ===
The International Relations minor "introduces students to the foundations and contemporary dynamics of the global political system."

By allowing students to "understand the historical development of the nation-state system" and focus on "Europe and its Empires," the minor allows students to "study global governance institutions established after World War II and their role in addressing global challenges." Students will also "analyze contemporary stresses on global governance and he complexities of understanding world events" while exploring "regional and national political cultures to deepen understanding of global political interactions."

== History ==
=== 20th century ===
LIU Global was founded in 1965 as Friends World College through an initiative of New York Yearly Meeting of the Religious Society of Friends (Quakers). Originally conceived as an international Quaker seminary, FWC's first campus was located on an abandoned airport, Mitchel Field, near Hempstead, New York, where the College's programs occupied unused barracks and hangars.

In the early 1970s, the College acquired the Livingston estate in Lloyd Harbor, New York through a bequest, and by 1972, it had relocated its North American center there, and in accordance with its vision for international education, had established satellite campuses in England, Kenya, India, Guatemala, and Japan. Later, it established campuses in Costa Rica, Israel, and China.

In order that its students might qualify for federally-guaranteed student loans and other Federal programs, the College dropped its formal Quaker affiliation in the mid-1970s and became nominally non-sectarian. However, the President at that time, Dr. George Watson, had already established a Quaker meeting on campus, and this remained until shortly before the College merged with Long Island University.

By the mid- to late-1980s, the College had encountered financial difficulties, and the sudden failure of its Israel program, plus the loss of a U.S. student to malaria in Kenya, helped bring about the Trustees' decision to accept an offer for merger from LIU. The Lloyd Harbor campus was sold to provide a much-needed cash influx, and the school was renamed Friends World Program. The North American campus was moved to LIU's Southampton College. during the 1991–1992 academic year.

=== 21st century ===
In the Fall of 2005, the program moved to LIU's Brooklyn Campus, after the campus was sold to Stony Brook University; thus the New York City Center was established. During this period, "Friends" was dropped, and the College became known as Global Studies LIU. In March 2007, the name Global College was adopted.

In January 2012, LIU launched an institution-wide rebranding campaign, and Global College became LIU Global. Around 70-90 students are currently enrolled at their centers and program sites worldwide.

After the events of the 2019-2023 COVID-19 pandemic, the enrolled number of students has dropped off from its original larger groups with the most recent enrollment class of 2030 following in their predecessor's footsteps.

=== Currently operating centers ===
- New York Center
- Costa Rica Center

=== Currently operating programs ===
- Asia-Pacific Australia Program
- Europe Program

=== Suspended centers ===
Regional centers are sometimes shut down indefinitely due to lack of funds, lack of demand, or security or health risks. As of July 2017, these included:

- West Africa Center, Kumasi, Ghana
- East Africa Center, Machakos, Kenya
- European Center, London, England
- Middle East Center, Jerusalem, Israel
- Japan Center, Kyoto, Japan
- Global Issues in South America, various sites in Peru and Ecuador
- South Africa Center, Durban, South Africa
- Comparative Religion and Culture Program, India, Turkey, Thailand, and Taiwan
- India Center, Bangalore, India
- China Center, Hangzhou, China

== Notable alumni ==
- Marla Ruzicka, class of 1999, an activist and aid worker who founded the Center for Civilians in Conflict
- Chris Marte, New York City council member.
