= Nicholas LaPorte =

American politician

Nicholas LaPorte Sr. (June 24, 1926 – December 1, 1990) was an American Democratic Party politician who settled in the Great Kills neighborhood of Staten Island, New York. He represented parts of that borough in the New York City Council from 1977–1984, then served as Deputy Borough President from 1985–1989. A street is named "Nick LaPorte Place" in his honor, between Barrett Triangle and Staten Island Borough Hall.

Political offices
Preceded by Anthony Gaeta	New York City Council, 1st district 1977–1984	Succeeded by Frank Fossella
Preceded by	Deputy Borough President of Staten Island; 1985–1989	Succeeded by James Molinaro
