= Center for Civilians in Conflict =

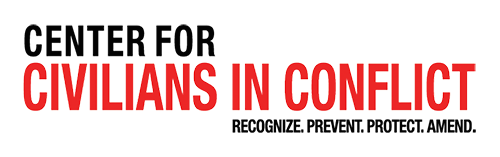
Center for Civilians in Conflict Logo

Center for Civilians in Conflict (CIVIC) is a Washington, D.C.–based non-profit, non-governmental organization (NGO) that works with political and community actors to mitigate civilian harm during conflict. CIVIC was founded initially in 2003 by Marla Ruzicka as the Campaign for Innocent Victims in Conflict, later renamed to focus their work on civilians. CIVIC works on behalf of civilians in conflict zones, providing research and advocating to policymakers. CIVIC is a part of the Making Amends Campaign. CIVIC's mission statement reads: "Our mission is to work with armed actors and civilians in conflict to develop and implement solutions to prevent, mitigate, and respond to civilian harm." CIVIC is headquartered in Washington, DC, with additional offices in The Hague and Geneva. It maintains regional offices in New York, Nigeria, Yemen, and Ukraine. The organization previously maintained offices in Afghanistan and Iraq, where it conducted extensive programming before closing operations in those countries.

== History ==
Center for Civilians in Conflict (CIVIC), formerly known as the Campaign for Innocent Victims in Conflict, was founded by activist and humanitarian, Marla Ruzicka, in 2003 in response to the U.S. military's lack of response to civilian casualties in Iraq. Through a door-to-door surveying mechanism, CIVIC sent 160 surveyors to Iraq to analyze the civilian cost of the conflict itself, thus beginning the first efforts of CIVIC. CIVIC continued to grow and received funding from US Government sources, among others dedicated to helping rebuild the lives of civilians unintentionally harmed by US combat operations. CIVIC engages with armed actors, including NATO member forces, to improve policies and practices around civilian protection.

However, tragedy struck in 2005, when Ruzicka, along with her driver were killed by a suicide bomb in Baghdad, Iraq, in April of that year. Later in the year of 2005, previous president George W. Bush signed legislation to rename the civilian war victims fund to the "Marla Ruzicka Iraqi War Victim Fund".

Ruzicka's colleagues, friends, and family continued to run CIVIC. The first staff members were hired in early 2006 and the organization expanded its mandate in early 2007 beyond Iraq and Afghanistan. CIVIC achievements include persuading US Congress to develop programs that aid victims caught in the middle of widespread conflict.

In 2012, CIVIC rebranded from Campaign for Innocent Victims in Conflict to its current name of the Center for Civilians in Conflict to ensure that they are being inclusive of all civilians.

2015 marked a major year for CIVIC as the organization released four reports outlining how they will respond to the new demand for their expertise.

In 2016, CIVIC published their first report on Ukraine, CIVIC’s 2016 Ukraine report was conducted before the current full-scale Russian invasion (launched in 2022), but ongoing work continues today. conducting a six-month research project on the capabilities, gaps, and potential for civilian protection in the Ukrainian military and Ministry of Defense. CIVIC additionally opened two field offices in Nigeria.

As of 2018, the United Nations has "called on each and every Member state to adopt a national policy on the protection of civilians."

== Mission ==
CIVIC's mission is established upon four main pillars: recognition, prevention, protection, and amends.

Beginning with recognition, CIVIC works to create spaces for civilians and advocates to discuss and identify their rights, specifically in cases where those rights have been violated. CIVIC also works to empower communities to publicly acknowledge the harm that has taken place.

In terms of prevention and protection, CIVIC intertwines these ideals by working within policy developments, collaborating with institutions such as the UN and African Union to work toward a sense of global security and stability by establishing safer conflict practices and policies.

Through amends, CIVIC seeks to advocate that post-conflict and peacekeeping practices are upheld through the amendment process. CIVIC representatives stating, "If civilians were "incidentally" harmed, the warring party should have a way of responding to the family with both respect and tangible help."

CIVIC utilizes a hands-on model to "document what civilians have been through" through a series of interviews and canvassing in an effort to demonstrate the needs that are not being met at the time.

== CIVIC Report Findings ==
In 2009, CIVIC released a report on civilian harm in Northwest Pakistan. It was based on a United Nations Assistance Mission in Afghanistan report that estimated a 40% increase in the number of civilian deaths in 2008. CIVIC's report concludes that civilian harm is compounded by widespread poverty and that while the Pakistani government does make amends most do not receive any due to deficiencies in compensation mechanisms and no effort from the US. Another survey released by an individual associated with CIVIC counted approximately 2,000 civilians killed and 4,000 injured. CIVICs reports suggest that the number of civilians killed and injured in war conflicts exceeds the number that the United States admits to.

== Accomplishments ==
In Afghanistan, CIVIC's research in Afghanistan and advocacy in Brussels directly led to NATO approving its first amends policy for Afghan war victims. CIVIC's advocacy in 2008-2009 led directly to the International Security Assistance Force (ISAF) command emphasis on civilian harm mitigation and a significant shift in tactics to avoid civilian harm. According to UN reports, pro-government elements, (which includes ISAF and Afghan forces) accounted for 39% of civilian deaths in 2008. By 2010 that percentage dropped to 15%, and declined further by 2013 to 11%.

In 2016, CIVIC conducted a six-month research project on the capabilities, gaps, and potential for civilian protection in the Ukrainian military and Ministry of Defense.

In 2017, CIVIC re-established a research and advocacy project in Mali to advance the protection of civilians through the UN peacekeeping operation, MINUSMA. Additionally, CIVIC successfully advocated for an increase in the capabilities of the peacekeeping operation in the Central African Republic (CAR) publishing "The Primacy of Protection: Delivering on the MINUSCA Mandate in the Central African Republic." In the Democratic Republic of Congo CIVIC published "Protection with Less Presence: How the Peacekeeping Operation in DRC Is Attempting to Deliver Protection with Fewer Resources," based on CIVIC's research regarding the impact of MONUSCO base closures.

== Current State ==
CIVIC published a 2021–2025 Strategic Plan that outlined goals for growth and assessment of global need.

The Strategic Plan states that CIVIC will expand its work with four main stakeholders: communities, Multinational bodies and coalitions, Governments and armed actors, and civil society. CIVIC will also be focused on the following three priorities: addressing impacted "urban warfare", "prioritizing protection in security force assistance and partnerships", and "developing new tools and approaches to assess and respond to civilian harm". Stated in the report, through these implementation strategies this will allow CIVIC to "contribute to a significant reduction in conflict-related civilian harm."

== See also ==
- Human rights in Pakistan
- United Nations
- War in North-West Pakistan
