= Manhattan Community Board 1 =

Community District in New York, United States

Coordinates: 40.7129°N 74.0037°W

Manhattan Community District 1
- Community district
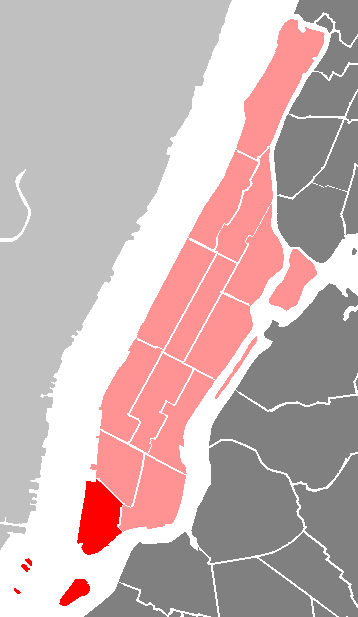

- Location in New York City Manhattan Community District 1 (New York) Manhattan Community District 1 (the United States)
- Country: United States
- State: New York
- City: New York City
- Borough: Manhattan
- Neighborhoods: list: Battery Park City; Civic Center; Financial District; South Street Seaport; TriBeCa; Ellis Island; Governors Island; Liberty Island

Government
  - Chairperson: Victoria Hillstrom
  - District Manager: Lucian Reynolds

Area
  - Land: 1.5 sq mi (3.9 km^{2})

Population (2010)
  - Total: 60,978
  - Density: 41,000/sq mi (16,000/km^{2})

Ethnicity
  - Hispanic and Latino Americans: 7.9%
  - African-American: 4.3%
  - White: 66.9%
  - Asian: 17.4%
  - Others: 3.4%
- Time zone: UTC−5 (Eastern)
  - Summer (DST): UTC−4 (EDT)
- Area code: 212, 646, and 332, and 917
- Police Precinct: 1st (website); 5th (website)
- New York City Council Districts: First
- Website: www1.nyc.gov/site/manhattancb1/index.page

The Manhattan Community Board 1 is a New York City community board encompassing the neighborhoods of Battery Park City, the Financial District, the South Street Seaport, and TriBeCa in Lower Manhattan in the borough of Manhattan as well as Liberty Island, Ellis Island and Governors Island. It is bounded by Baxter Street, Pearl Street, the Brooklyn Bridge and the East River on the east, Upper New York Bay on the south, the Hudson River on the west and Canal Street on the north.

Manhattan Community Board 1's current chairperson is Tammy Meltzer and its staff includes: District Manager Zach Bommer, Director of Land Use and Planning Diana Switaj, Planning Consultant Michael Levine, Community Liaison Tamar Hovsepian and Community Coordinator Lucy Acevedo.

The Manhattan Community Board 1 office is located at 1 Centre Street, Room 2202 North, New York, NY 10007.

== Demographics ==
Historical population
Census	Pop.	Note	%±
1980	15,918		—
1990	25,366		59.4%
2000	34,420		35.7%
2010	60,978		77.2%
2020	78,390		28.6%

As of the 2010 United States census, the Community District has a population of 60,978, up from 34,420 in 2000, 25,366 in 1990, and 15,918 in 1980. Of them (as of 2010), 40,810 (66.9%) are white non-Hispanic, 2,595 (4.3%) are African American, 10,627 (17.4%) Asian or Pacific Islander, 55 (0.1%) American Indian or Native Alaskan, 264 (0.4%) of some other non-Hispanic race, 1,780 (2.9%) of two or more non-Hispanic races, 4,847 (7.9%) of Hispanic origins. 5.6% of the population benefit from public assistance as of 2011, down from 9.6% in 2005.

After 9/11, many buildings converted from commercial to residential uses, drawing many new residents. Formerly a hub of financial and commercial activity, Community District 1 is quickly transforming into a mixed-use 24/7 area. A component of this transformation is a rapidly growing child population.

In 2013, Community Board 1 planning staff conducted a demographic analysis to document the district's increasing youth population. Using block-level data from the 2000 and 2010 Census, the analysis showed that each Community District 1 neighborhood had experienced an extreme increase in its youth populations; particularly in the 0-4 and 5-9 age groups. For instance, the average growth of the 0-4 population in the entire borough of Manhattan increased .7% between 2000 and 2010, but increased 149% in Battery Park City, 196% in Tribeca, 57% in the Seaport/Civic Center, and 242% in the Financial District. Similarly, between 2000 and 2010, the 5-9 age group decreased 16.4% in the entire borough of Manhattan, but increased 75% in Battery Park City, 69% in Tribeca, 44% in the Seaport/Civic Center, and 158% in the Financial District.

On April 15, 2015, Manhattan Community District 1 conducted a follow-up study on the population increase and demographic changes in the area. The study utilized a compilation of built and expected new residential units in the area and multiplied by the average household size (1.94). The residential units count was tabulated from 2012 to 2015 and beyond using various news media sources in addition to data from the Lower Manhattan Construction Command Center and the New York City Department of Transportation Construction Project list. Final residential unit counts may vary as they are continuously being updated. The results of the study showed that an estimated total of 8,466 additional residential units have been constructed or are planned for construction since 2012. Furthermore, based on the residential units tabulation, total population in Manhattan Community District 1 has steadily increased at an average rate of approximately 5% annually.

Demographic changes in Manhattan Community District 1 including the rapidly growing residential population and subsequent increase in children ages 0–18 have major implications for the area. In many cases, the development of community infrastructure has not matched the changing demographics. For instance, Community District 1 has severe school overcrowding issues. Trends in birth rates and residential development indicate that the residential and youth populations of Community District 1 are likely to continue to increase.

The land area is 955.6 acres, or 1.5 square miles (3.9 km^{2}).
