= 1927 New York City aldermanic election =

- November 8, 1927

All 72 seats of the New York City Board of Aldermen 37 seats needed for a majority
	Majority party	Minority party
Party	Democratic	Republican
Seats won	66	6

An election was held on November 8, 1927 to fill the 72 seats of the New York City Board of Aldermen, in addition to elections to the New York State Assembly and various other questions on the ballot. 66 Democrats and 6 Republicans were elected to the Board. Brooklyn lost its sole Republican alderman.

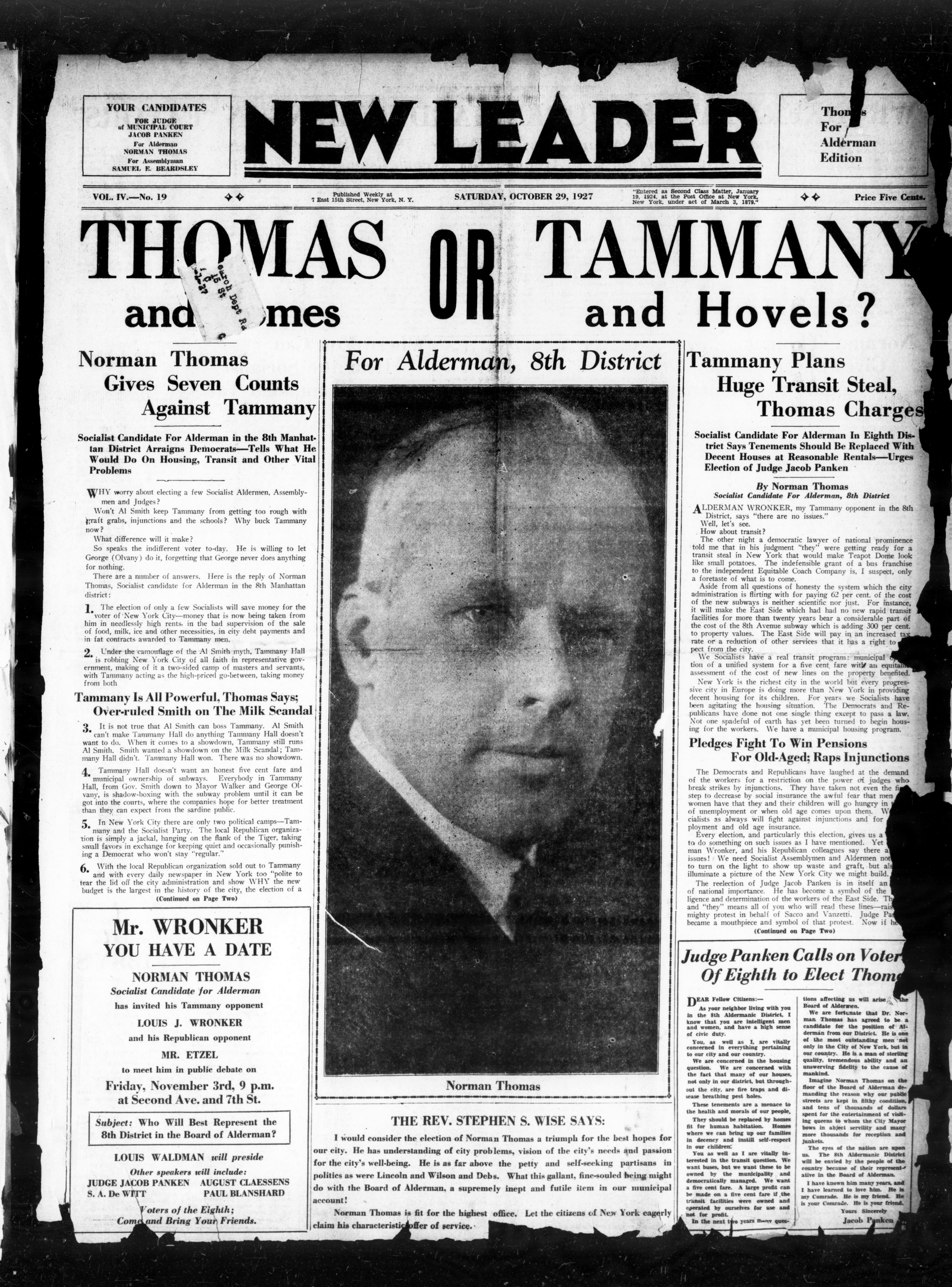
Front page of the New Leader featuring Aldermanic candidate Norman Thomas, October 19
