= Novy mir (1911 newspaper) =

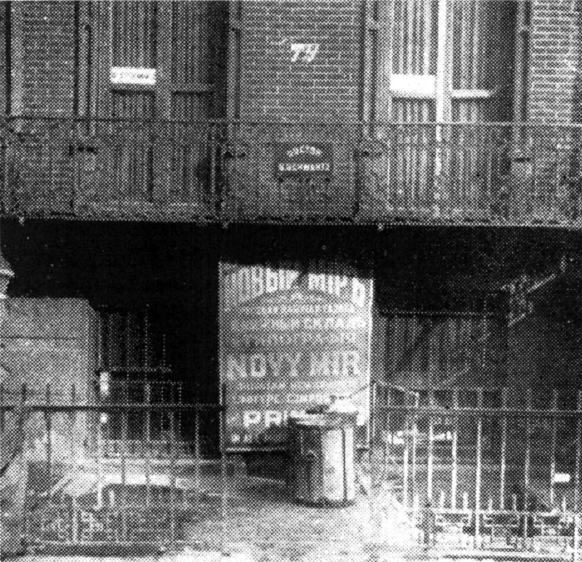
Offices of Novy mir

Novy mir (Pre-Revolution Russian: Но́вый мíръ, Post-Revolution Russian: Но́вый ми́р, IPA: [ˈnovɨj ˈmʲir], New World) was a Russian language socialist newspaper published in the United States during 1911-1938.

It was published by Russian social democratic émigrés in New York City in 1911–1917 until their return to Russia after the February Revolution of 1917. Its first editor-in-chief was Leo Deutsch. By 1916 it was edited by Nikolai Bukharin and Alexandra Kollontai, who were briefly joined by Leon Trotsky when he arrived in New York in January 1917. V. Volodarsky, then living in Philadelphia, was one of the contributors.

After the Russian Revolution the newspaper was issued intermittently putting forth varying moderate laborist and leftist politics until 1930s.
