= Manhattan Community Board 3 =

Community District in New York, United States

Manhattan Community District 3
- Community District
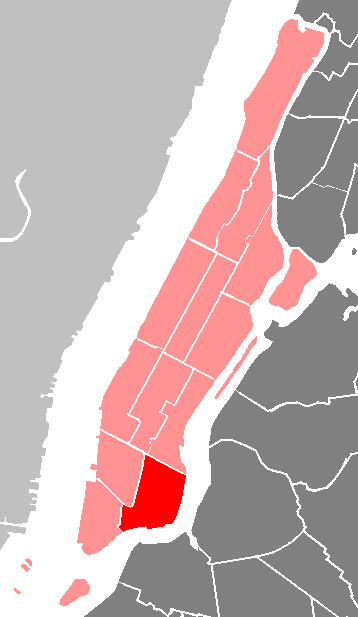
- Country: United States
- State: New York
- City: New York City
- Borough: Manhattan
- Neighborhoods: list: Alphabet City; Portions of Chinatown; East Village; Lower East Side; Two Bridges

Government
  - Chairperson: Andrea Gordillo
  - District Manager: Susan Stetzer

Area
  - Land: 1.7 sq mi (4.4 km^{2})

Population (2020)
  - Total: 163,141
  - Density: 96,000/sq mi (37,000/km^{2})

Ethnicity
  - Hispanic and Latino Americans: 24.6%
  - African-American: 6.9%
  - White: 32.4%
  - Asian: 33.8%
  - Others: 2.3%
- Time zone: UTC−5 (Eastern)
  - Summer (DST): UTC−4 (EDT)
- ZIP Codes: 10002, 10003, 10007, 10009, 10013, 100038
- Area code: 212, 646, and 332, and 917
- Police Precinct: 5th (website); 7th (website); 9th (website)
- Website: www.cleanupcb3.com,

The Manhattan Community Board 3 is a New York City community board encompassing the Manhattan neighborhoods of the East Village, the Lower East Side, Two Bridges, and a large portion of Chinatown. It is delimited by the East River on the east, the Brooklyn Bridge on the south, Pearl Street, Baxter Street, Canal Street, Bowery and Fourth Avenue on the west, as well as by the 14th Street on the north.

Its current chair is Andrea Gordillo, and its district manager Susan Stetzer. Like all community boards in New York City, its members are unelected political appointees.

== Demographics ==
Historical population
Census	Pop.	Note	%±
1980	154,848		—
1990	161,617		4.4%
2000	164,407		1.7%
2010	163,277		−0.7%

As of the 2020 United States census, Community Board 3 has a population of 163,141, about the same as in 2010 United States census. This is down from 164,407 in 2000 but up from 161,617 in 1990. Of them (as of 2010), 52,898 (32.4%) are White non-Hispanic, 11,294 (6.9%) are African-American, 55,180 (33.8%) Asian or Pacific Islander, 241 (0.1%) American Indian or Native Alaskan, 434 (0.3%) of some other race, 3,036 (1.9%) of two or more race, 40,194 (24.6%) of Hispanic origins.

The racial make-up as of the 2000 census was 46,396 (28.2%) White non-Hispanic, 11,633 (7.1%) African-American, 57,871 (35.2%) Asian or Pacific Islander, 240 (0.1%) American Indian or Native Alaskan, 997 (0.4%) of some other race, 3,475 (2.1%) of two or more race, 44,195 (26.9%) of Hispanic origins.

49.6% of the population benefit from public assistance as of 2009, up from 23.4 in 2000.

The land area is 1,077.1 acres, or 1.7 square miles (4.4 km^{2}).
