= Murray W. Stand =

American politician (1897 – 1956

Murray W. Stand (1897 – May 17, 1956) was an American politician who served the 4th district of the New York City Board of Aldermen during the 1920s and 1930s. The majority leader of the Board, he later became the Chairman of the World's Fair Commission in 1937. He died of a heart attack on May 17, 1956, while attending a service at the Civic Center Synagogue.
