= Church Street and Trinity Place =

North-south street in Manhattan, New York

Coordinates: 40.7157°N 74.0073°W

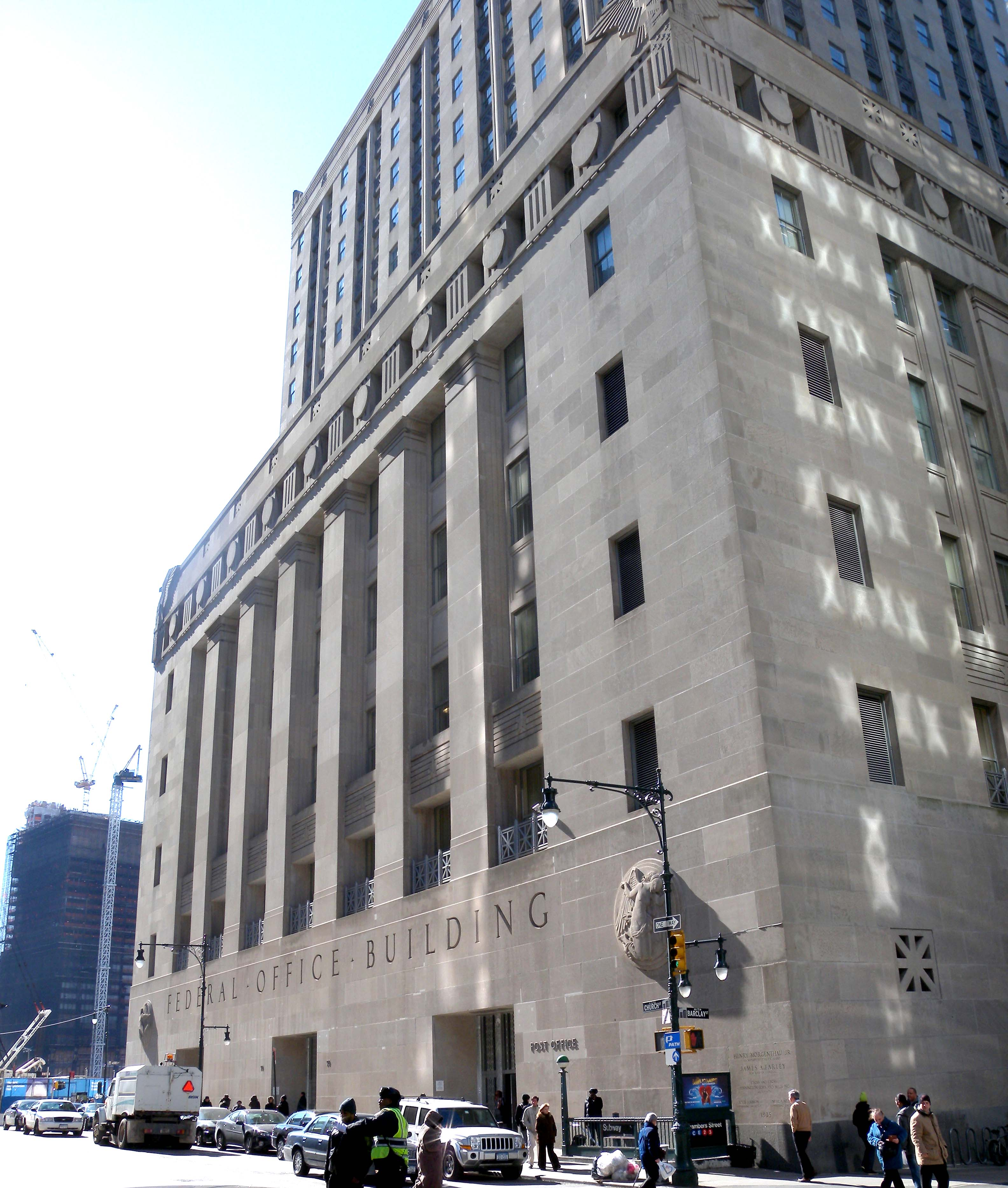
Church Street Station post office

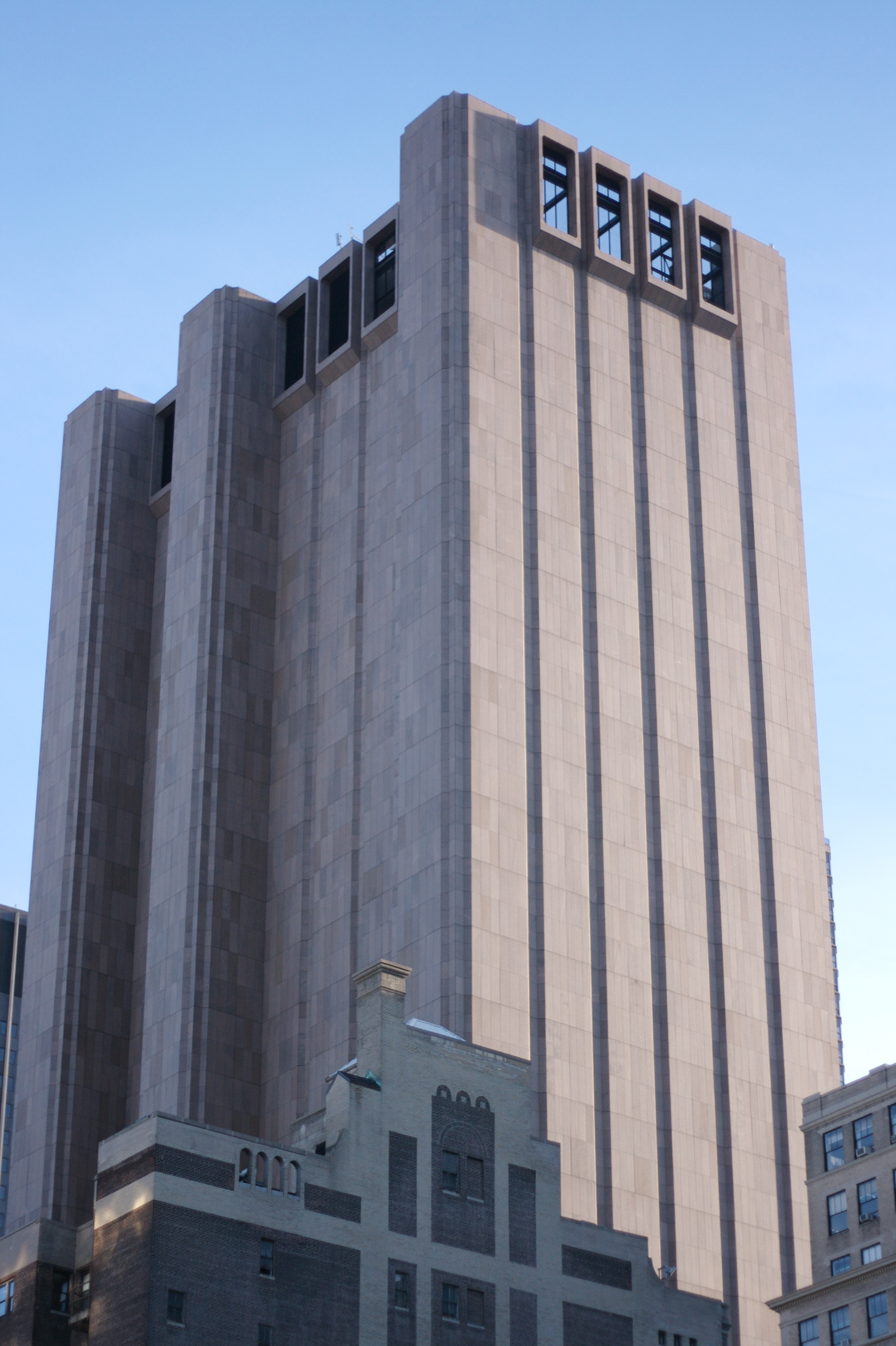
AT&T Long Lines Building

Church Street and Trinity Place form a single northbound roadway in Lower Manhattan, New York City. Its northern end is at Canal Street and its southern end is at Morris Street, where Trinity Place merges with Greenwich Street. The dividing point is Liberty Street.

== Description ==
Trinity Place branches off Greenwich Street at Morris Street, running uptown to the northeast, passing west of Trinity Church, the Trinity and United States Realty Buildings, and Zuccotti Park. At Liberty Street it becomes Church Street, which forms the eastern boundary of the World Trade Center to Vesey Street. At Franklin Street, a few blocks south of Canal Street, Avenue of the Americas (Sixth Avenue) branches off. Trinity Place, Church Street, and Avenue of the Americas form a continuous northbound through-route from Lower Manhattan to Central Park.

Church Street is named after Trinity Church, a historic Gothic-style parish church on Broadway at Wall Street. Extended in 1784, Church Street was in existence as early as 1761. Part of the street was owned by the church, but was given to the city in 1804. Trinity Place is also a namesake of the church, being named so in 1834, prior to which it was known at various times as "Lumber Street" and "Lombard Street".

Before 1869, the south end of Church Street was at Fulton Street, three blocks north of Trinity Place. Then, over several years, an 80-foot wide connection was cut through the intervening blocks and Trinity Place was widened to 80 feet (24 m) and extended south to Morris Street; Church Street north of Fulton Street was left 40 feet (12 m) wide at the time. The work, plagued by delays and allegedly corruption, was completed by the end of 1872.

In June 1878 an elevated railway line, the IRT Sixth Avenue Line, opened. It ran on Trinity Place and Church Street to Murray Street, where it turned west and then north on West Broadway. It closed in 1938 and was razed the following year.

As part of the construction of the Eighth Avenue subway line, from 1929 to 1932 Church Street was widened between Fulton Street and Franklin Street from 40 feet including 10-foot sidewalks, to 90 feet including 15-foot sidewalks. Only the west property line was moved; the east side of the street was left intact.

== Places ==
The Church Street Station post office at 90 Church Street serves the 10048 ZIP code as well as the surrounding area, and is listed on the National Register of Historic Places (NRHP), as is the Canal Street Station post office at the north end of Church Street. Just south of the latter is the former Long Distance Building of the American Telephone & Telegraph Company, at 32 Avenue of the Americas, also known as 310–322 Church Street, a New York City designated landmark (NYCL). The Cary Building and St. Peter's Church are both New York City landmarks also listed on the NRHP. Church Street borders the rear of the 1765 St. Paul's Chapel, another NYC landmark on the NRHP as well as a U.S. National Historic Landmark (NHL). Also notable are the residential towers at 30 Park Place and 56 Leonard Street, and the former AT&T Long Lines Building at 33 Thomas Street.

Near Rector Street, Trinity Place passes under the Trinity Place bridge. Designed by LHP Architects and completed in 1989, the bridge is a private elevated walkway which formerly connected the rear side of Trinity Church to its offices and preschool in the Trinity Court Building across Trinity Place. That building has been demolished, and its replacement is currently under construction, with the opening expected in 2020. The bridge has been preserved and will return to use at that time.

Directly north of that site is the American Stock Exchange Building, listed on the NRHP and an NHL. Next to that are the Leadership & Public Service High School and High School of Economics and Finance, both New York City public high schools.

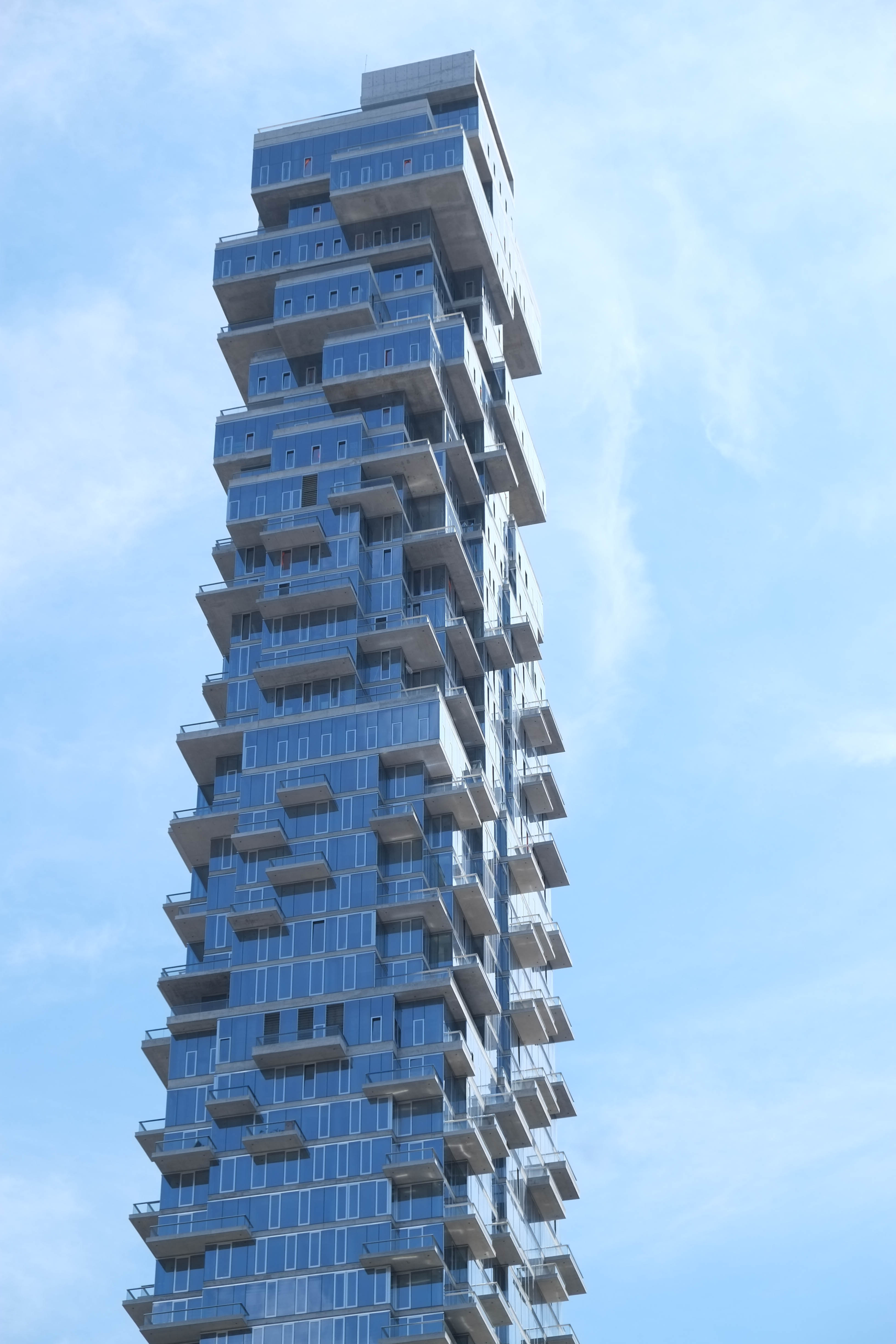
56 Leonard Street

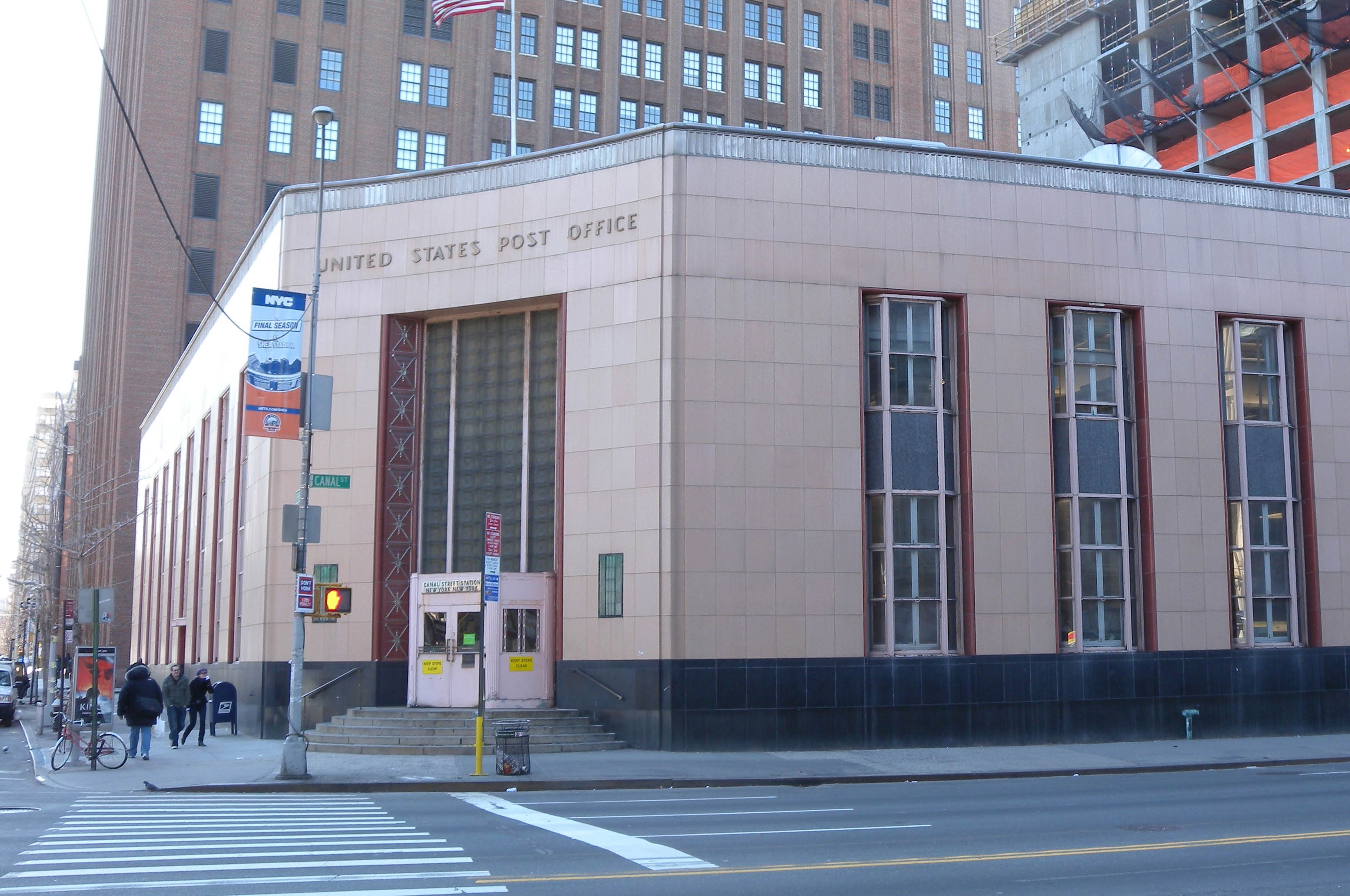
Canal Street Station post office

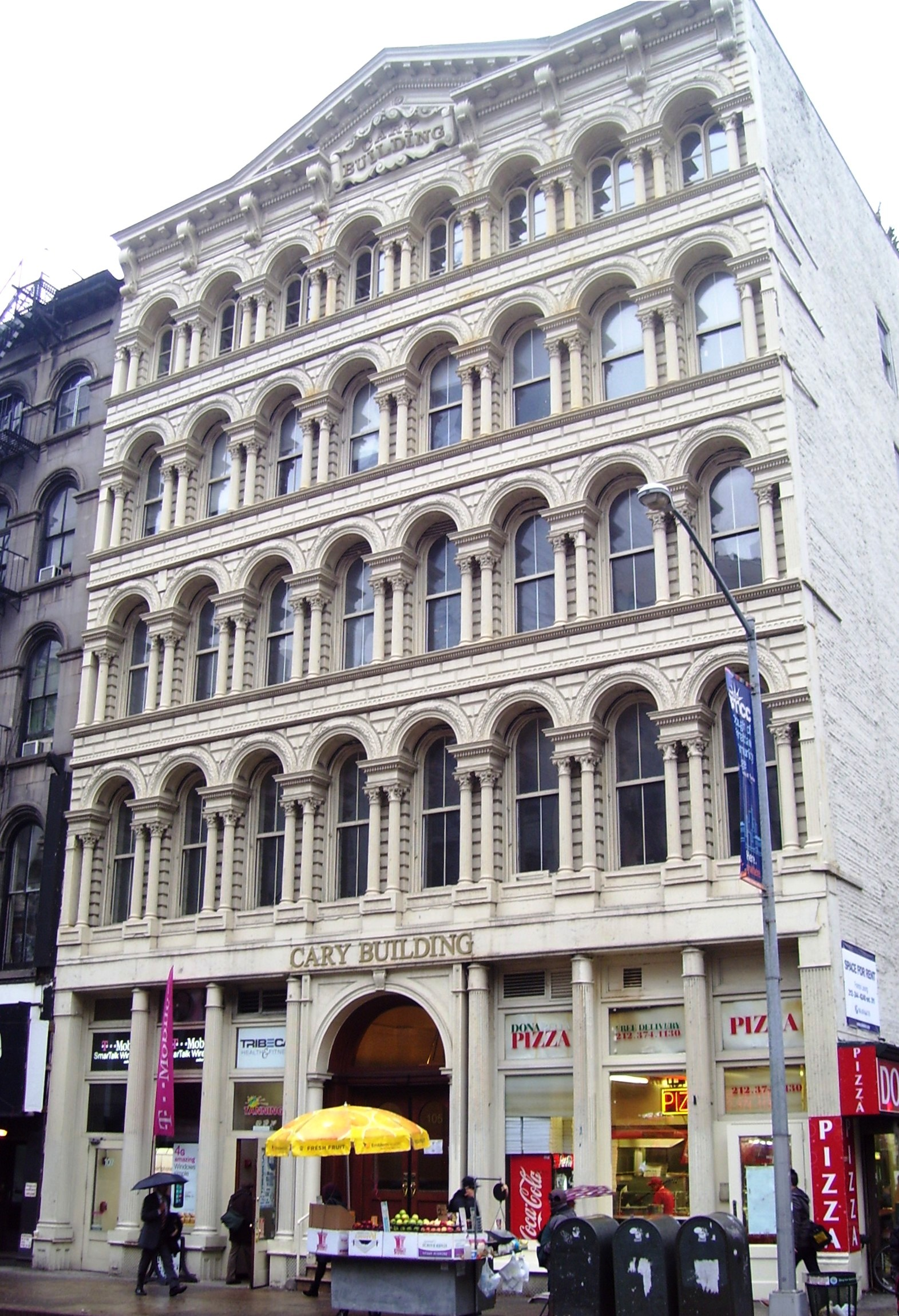
Cary Building

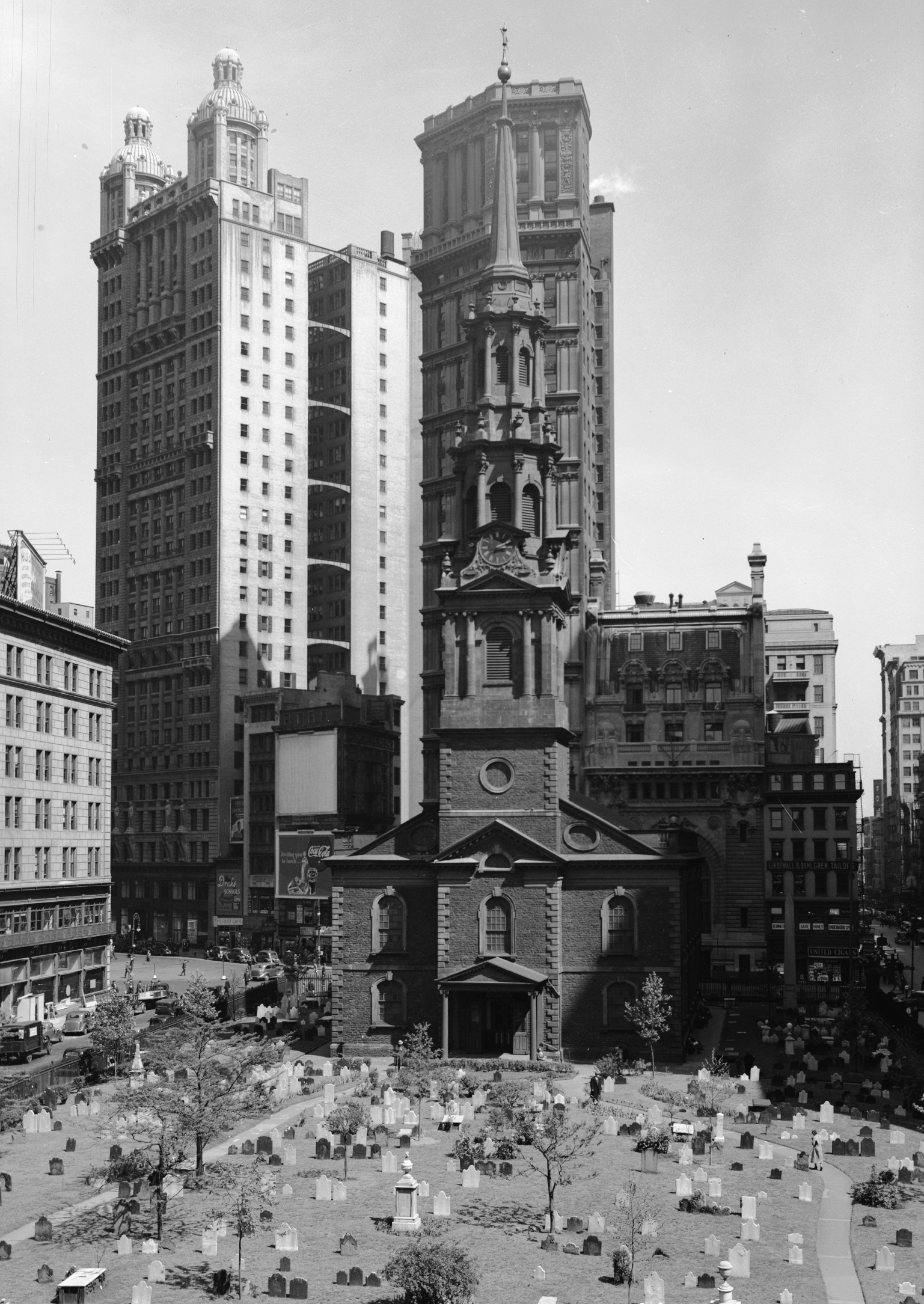
Rear of St. Paul's Chapel in 1937

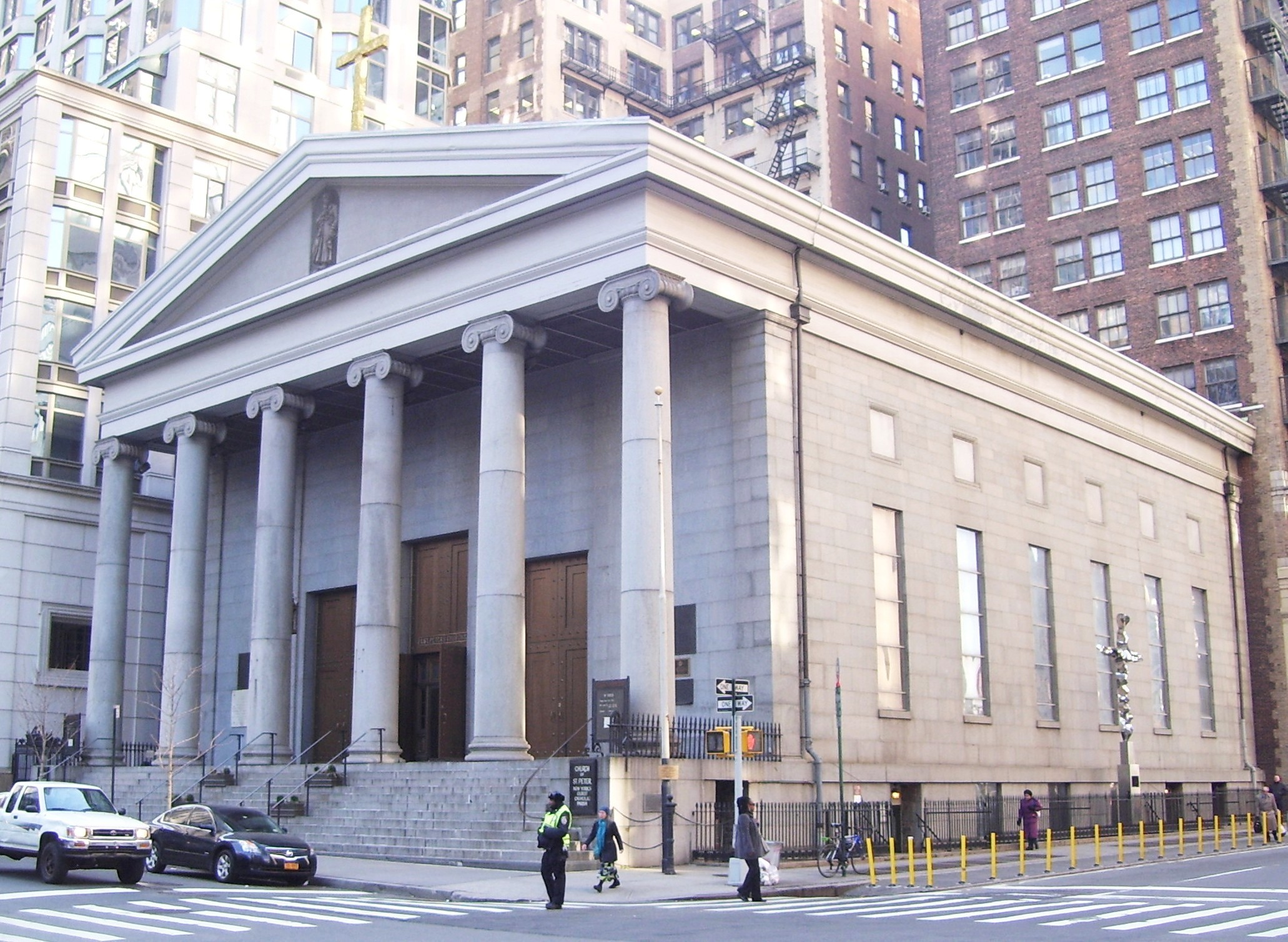
St. Peter's Roman Catholic Church

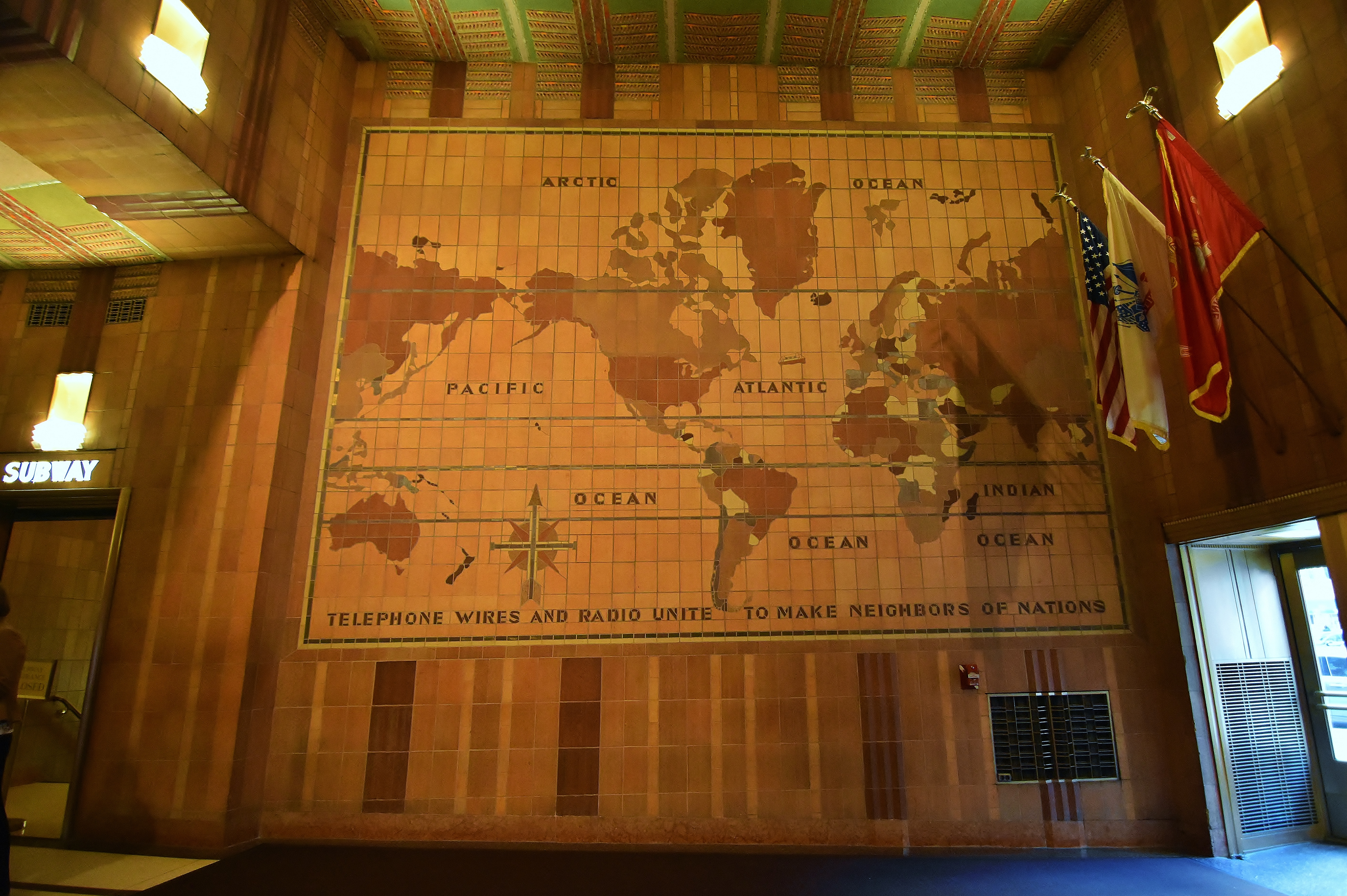
Lobby of 32 Avenue of the Americas

Other historic sites on or just off Trinity Place or Church Street:

- Cunard Building on Morris Street, at the foot of Trinity Place, is visible the entire length of Trinity Place and Church Street (NYCL)
- Robert and Anne Dickey House at Edgar Street (NYCL)
- 65 Broadway, between Exchange Alley and Rector Street (NYCL)
- Empire Building at Rector Street (NRHP, NYCL)
- Old New York Evening Post Building, 20 Vesey Street, between Church Street and Broadway (NRHP, NYCL)
- New York County Lawyers' Association Building, 14 Vesey Street, between Church Street and Broadway (NRHP, NYCL)
- 23 and 25 Park Place Buildings, between Church Street and Broadway (NYCL)
- Kitchen, Montross & Wilcox Store, 85 Leonard Street, between Church Street and Broadway (NRHP, NYCL)

In addition, Church Street runs through Tribeca South and Tribeca East Historic Districts (NYCL).

== Transportation ==
The IND Eighth Avenue Line (A, C, and E trains) of the New York City Subway runs below Church Street north of Fulton Street to Sixth Avenue. A portion of the BMT Broadway Line (N, R, and W trains) runs under Church Street and Trinity Place from Greenwich Street to Fulton Street. Its Cortlandt Street station, damaged in the September 11 attacks, is adjacent to the World Trade Center.

The uptown M55 bus runs along Trinity Place/Church Street from Morris Street to Franklin Street, where it continues north on Sixth Avenue (downtown buses use Broadway). Additional service is provided by the downtown M9 running north from Barclay to Murray Streets (uptown buses cross east on Warren Street).

== See also ==
- Millennium Downtown New York Hotel
