= Leadership & Public Service High School =

Public school in New York City

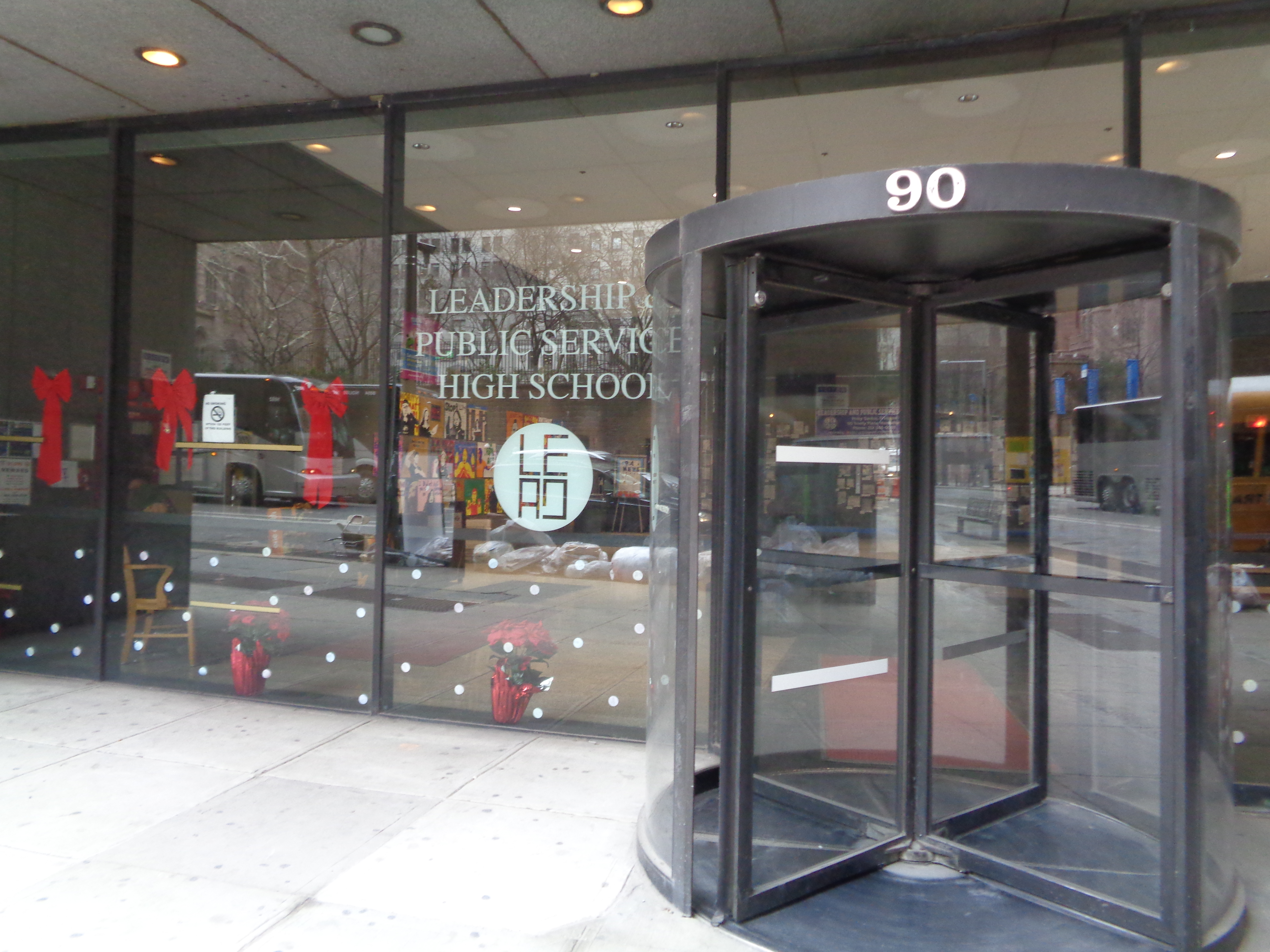
- Entrance from Trinity Place

Location
- 90 Trinity Place; New York City, New York; USA; 40.709271°N 74.012094°W

Information
- Type: Public (secondary school) secondary
- Motto: Leadership Means Setting an Example Worth Following
- Established: 1993
- Principal: Philip Santos
- Faculty: 43
- Grades: 9-12
- Enrollment: 646
- Colors: Blue and Orange
- Mascot: Panther
- Newspaper: Soul Of The Panther
- Website: leadershipnyc.org

Leadership & Public Service High School (formerly known as The High School for Leadership and Public Service) was formed in 1993 in Manhattan as a joint project between Syracuse University's Maxwell School of Citizenship and Public Affairs and the Board of Education of the City of New York, as one of 30 newly formed "small high schools". Among the school's notable founders includes that of Syracuse University Professor Dr. Bill Coplin, S.U. Alumnus Donald Schupak and several members of The Friends of HSLAPS (Now called The Friends of Leadership & Public Service High School). Due to the school's close proximity to the World Trade Center (three blocks south) and Wall Street, it was one of the four high schools in Lower Manhattan area to be displaced by the September 11 attacks.

== History ==
=== Building ===
90 Trinity Place is the grey building behind Trinity Church and in front of the corner of the South Tower of the World Trade Center

The building in which Leadership is currently located at, was a post-modern building, designed by Skidmore, Owings & Merrill in 1975. The building itself was the home of the New York University Stern School of Business from the late 1970s to the early 1990s. In order to make way for the newly formed High School for Leadership and Public Service, the Board of Education of the City of New York, leased the building, 90 Trinity Place, from NYU. Until the renovations on the building were complete, Leadership was forced to share 3 floors next door with its neighbors, the High School of Economics and Finance (100 Trinity Place), during the 1993–94 school year.

=== School ===
Helen Cohen, the first principal (1993–1995), had a goal to prepared the students for college, and with the help of staff, most of the students in the first graduating classes got into college. Ada Rosario-Dolch, the second principal of the school (1995–2004), tried hard to make sure that the students passed the New York State Regents exams. Dolch worked hard to make the school effective, hiring more staff in the process.

Leadership enjoyed a high school-to-college ratio, with the majority of the students eventually graduating from college.

=== September 11, 2001 ===
Notable in Leadership's history is the effects of the September 11 attacks. Leadership, a block south of the South Tower along with its neighbor school (Economics and Finance) found it necessary to evacuate after the second plane hit. The engine of the second plane landed on Leadership's roof, and the school building itself was used as one of the morgue sites in the aftermath. The day of the attack, however, Principal Dolch was on the street welcoming voters to the school's polling booths and thus was on the street when the first plane hit. She suspected immediately that her sister, a Cantor Fitzgerald employee, very likely hadn't survived the first attack and focused on evacuating students and teachers safely.

Dolch, school secretary Lisa Quigley, AP Ted Bronsnick, and Dean of Students Neil Marks, assisted by Police Officer Ryan Baldwin of the 001 precinct evacuated the 14-story building from the top down in minutes, out the south-east entrance and down to Battery Park. Julia Martinez and Margaret Espinosa, who worked as special ed, one-on-one paras at the school risked their lives by carrying two teen-age students to safety after the girls' wheelchairs broke down from being pushed through the rubble. Randy Spotts, a dean, and John, a security officer at the school, stayed behind after the evacuation and assisted people outside who had been harmed by debris. They also assisted neighboring cart owners to safety.

Many students and teachers eventually found boats and ferries to get them away from Manhattan and a large contingent of students accompanied their math teachers, Conrad Sparnroft and Brian Donnelly, to Staten Island; another contingent took ferries to New Jersey with English and history teachers. A few more accompanied teachers on private yachts arriving down from the 79th street boat basin. Another small group accompanied a teacher, Virginia Pruitt, who had looked for students remaining in the area, to Brooklyn and her home. The only injury was a sprained ankle during the stair descent. No windows were broken on the building, though the gaskets sealing the windows failed in the face of the collapsing towers, as dust covered everything inside the building. No students lost family members in the attacks, although some parents had been working in the area.

=== Post-September 11 ===
After 11 September 2001, the school was housed temporarily at Fashion Industries High School. The merging of the two schools was fraught and the teachers and students were relieved to be allowed back to their own building at the end of the first semester. Regular air testing and dust testing was conducted throughout the year. However, doubt remains as to the safety of the air in the area. Nearly two years later, the EPA's Office of the Inspector General (OIG) reported that the EPA “did not have sufficient data and analyses to make such a blanket statement,” as “air monitoring data was lacking for several pollutants of concern.” September 11 had an enormous, if sometimes delayed, impact on the staff, students and the school overall. Enrollment declined, and a period of instability followed, with a revolving door of principals and an uneven record of academic performance beginning. Lessons in school management and support in the wake of disasters could be taken from the Department of Education's handling of the relocation and aftermath of the attacks.

== Sports and extracurricular activities ==
PSAL Sports

- Basketball
- Softball
- Volleyball

Extracurricular Activities

- Photography Club
- Journalism Club
- Robotics Club
- Chess Club
- Chorus Group
- Moot Court & Mock Trial Team, in partnership with Sidley Austin.
- SUMMA- Syracuse University Mentor-Mentee Association- Students from HSLAPS are paired up with current or former students of Syracuse University to provide a mentor to guide them through high school and the college application process. Students are selected through an application process which begins in September. Open to everyone from 10th Grade and Up.

== Notable alumni ==
- Anahad O'Connor – NYTimes scholarship winner; writer for the New York Times
