= New York County Lawyers' Association Building =

Historic building in Manhattan, New York

- U.S. National Register of Historic Places
- New York State Register of Historic Places
- New York City Landmark
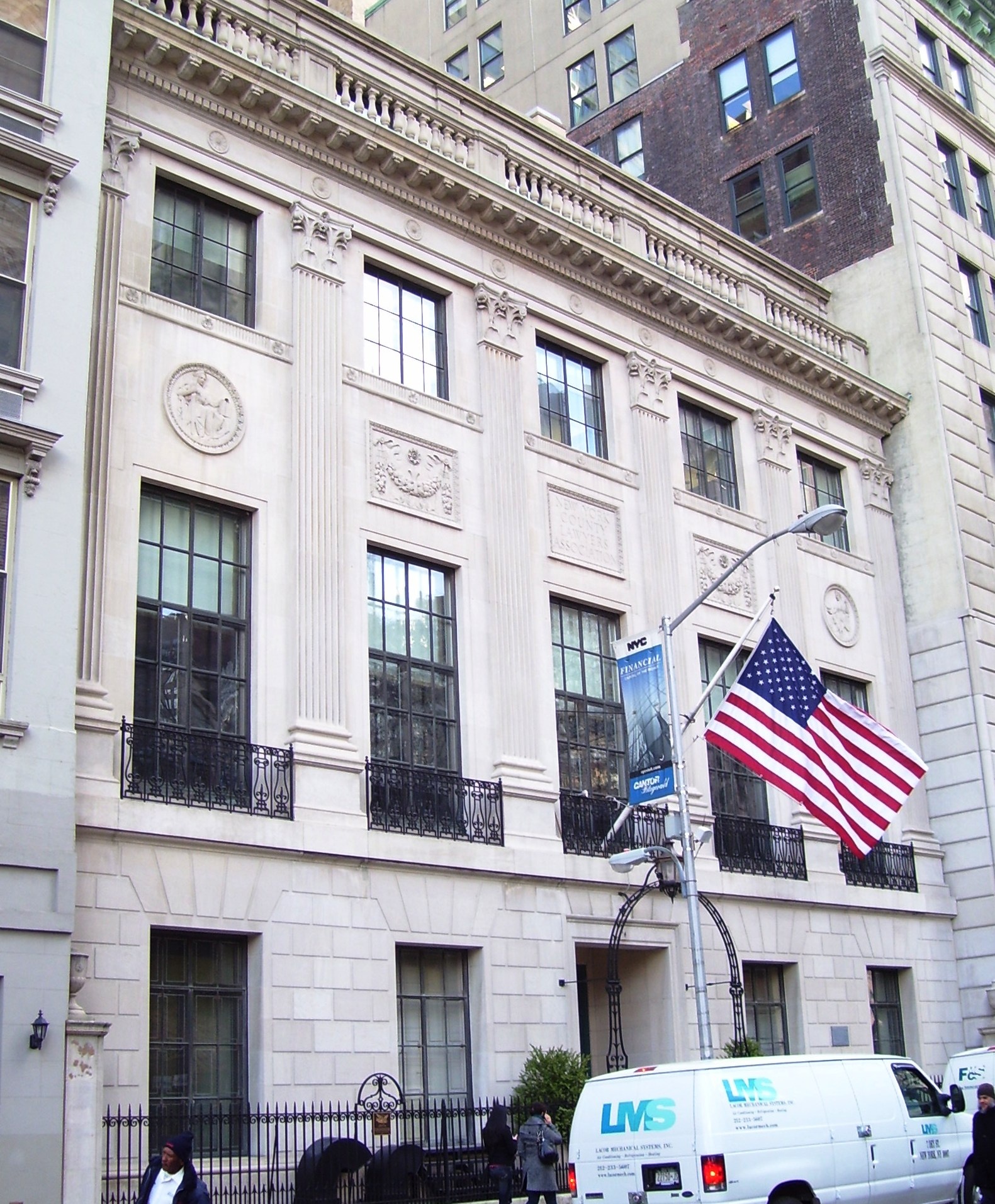
- Location: 14 Vesey Street, Manhattan, New York City
- Coordinates: 40°42′43″N 74°0′35″W
- Built: 1929-30
- Architect: Cass Gilbert
- Architectural style: Georgian Revival
- NRHP reference No.: 82001201
- NYSRHP No.: 06101.000036
- NYCL No.: 0076

Significant dates
- Added to NRHP: October 29, 1982
- Designated NYSRHP: September 21, 1982
- Designated NYCL: November 23, 1965

The New York County Lawyers' Association Building is a structure at 14 Vesey Street between Broadway and Church Street in the Financial District of Manhattan, New York City. It was built in 1929–30 and was designed by architect Cass Gilbert in the English Georgian style for the Association, which was founded in 1908. Gilbert's design complements Trinity Church's St. Paul's Chapel, which sits across the street.

The building, which was the NYCLA's headquarters until 2020, was designated a New York City landmark in 1965, and was added to the National Register of Historic Places in 1982.

== See also ==
- National Register of Historic Places listings in Manhattan below 14th Street
- List of New York City Designated Landmarks in Manhattan below 14th Street
