= High School of Economics and Finance =

Public school in New York City

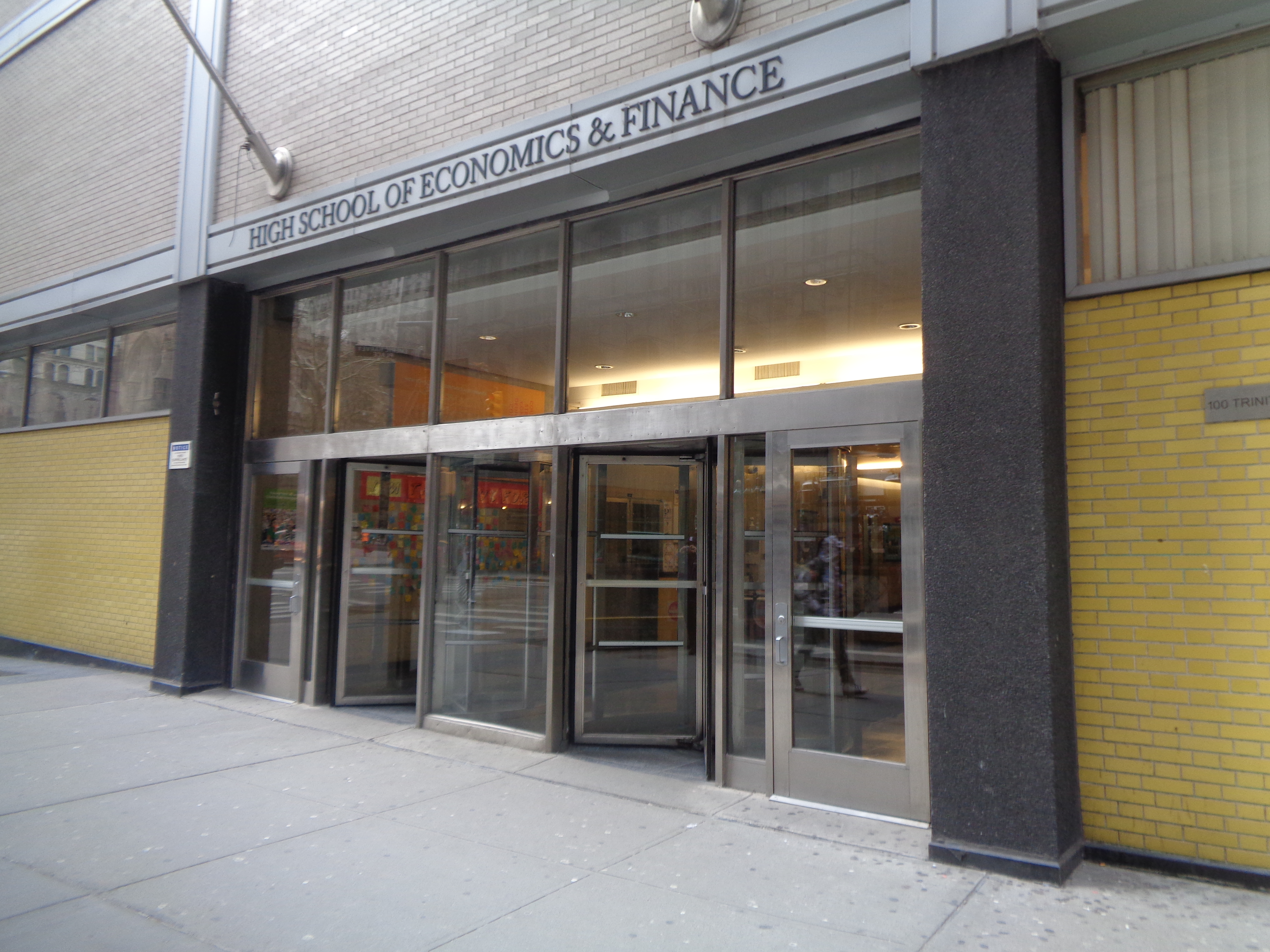
- Entrance from Trinity Place

Location
- 100 Trinity Place, New York, NY, 10006; New York, New York, USA; 40°42′33″N 74°00′44″W

Information
- Type: Public (secondary school) secondary
- Motto: "Building Futures and Options"
- Established: 1993
- Principal: Michael F. Stanzione
- Faculty: 92
- Grades: 9-12
- Enrollment: 860
- Color: Burgundy
- Mascot: Panther

The High School of Economics and Finance (HSEF) is a public high school in Manhattan, New York City located at 100 Trinity Place in the Financial District. The building was formerly the home of New York University's graduate business school. The school's curriculum incorporates study of corporate business and finance. College level accounting classes are offered to all students. The school cultivates business internship relationships with corporations including Deutsche Bank and Citigroup. HSEF's relationship with Citigroup is unique, since the New York City Department of Education partnered with the company to found the school in 1993.

== September 11th ==
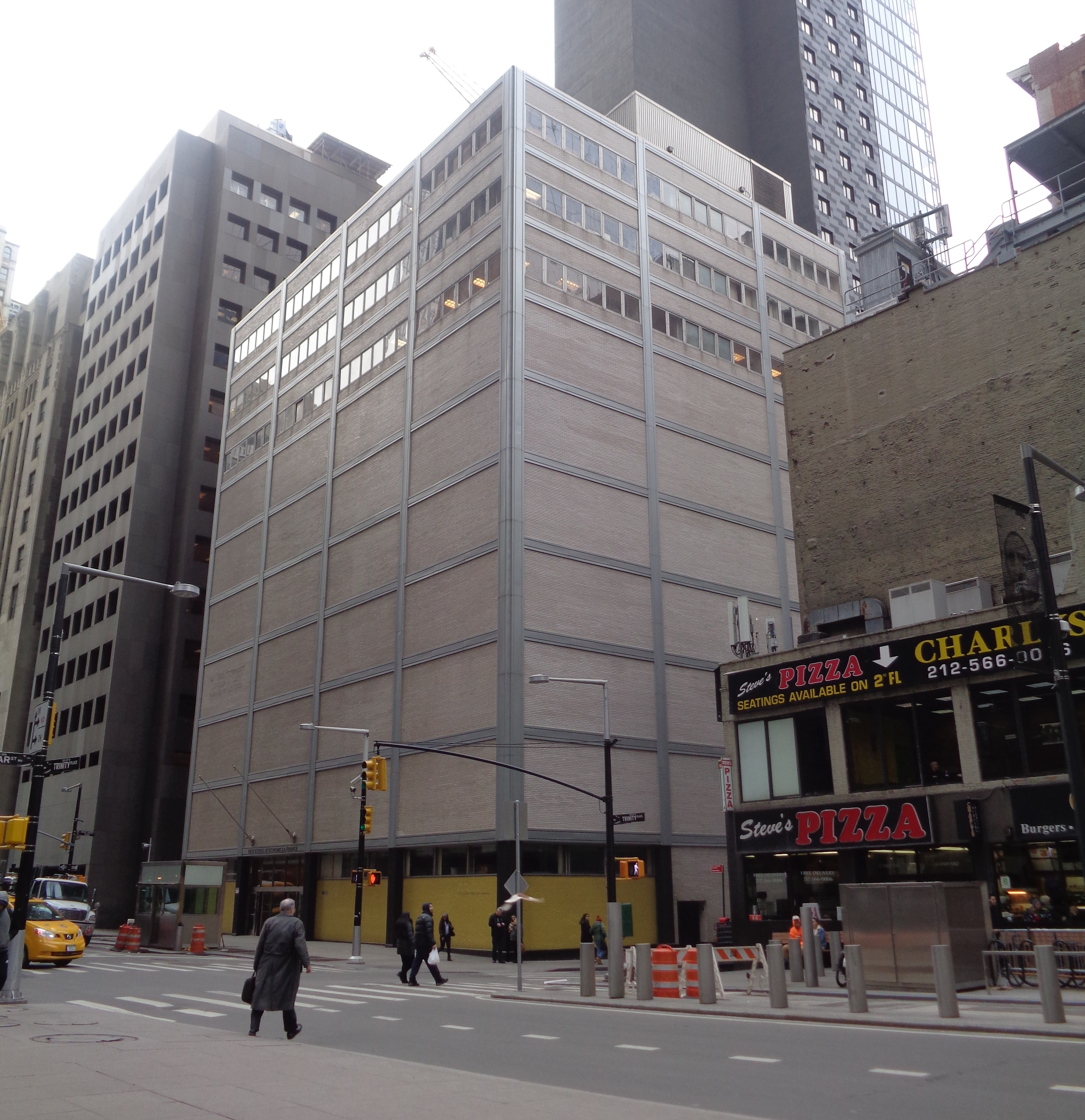
The school building, looking from Zuccotti Park, in 2017

The High School of Economics and Finance was the closest high school in the city to the World Trade Center site, at 1 block from the World Trade Center, and students were heavily affected by the events of September 11th, 2001. After September 11, the school shared facilities with Norman Thomas High School in the Murray Hill neighborhood.
