= 90 Church Street =

Historic post office in Manhattan, New York

- 90 Church Street (U.S. Post Office – Church Street Station)
- U.S. National Register of Historic Places
- New York State Register of Historic Places
- 90 Church Street in 2026
- Location: 90 Church Street; Manhattan, New York City
- Coordinates: 40°42′45″N 74°0′40″W
- Built: 1934–35
- Architects: Cross and Cross; Pennington, Lewis & Mills; Lewis A. Simon (Superv. Arch. of the Treasury)
- Architectural style: Classical Revival and Art Deco
- MPS: US Post Offices in New York State, 1858-1943, TR
- NRHP reference No.: 88002359
- NYSRHP No.: 06101.001780

Significant dates
- Added to NRHP: May 11, 1989
- Designated NYSRHP: May 11, 1989

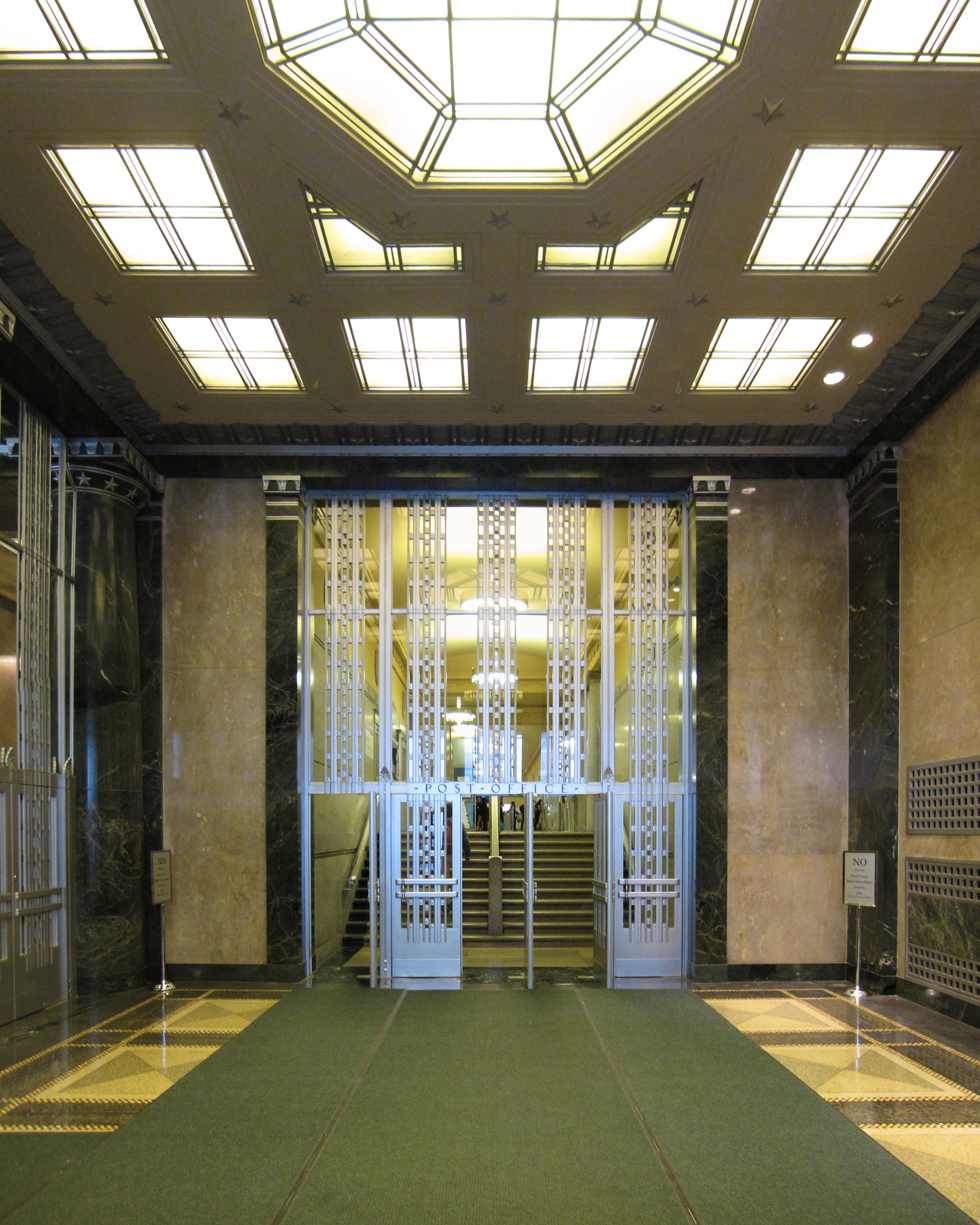
Entrance hall

90 Church Street is a federal office building in Lower Manhattan in New York City. The building houses the United States Postal Service's Church Street Station, which is responsible for the 10007 ZIP Code. The building takes up a full block between Church Street and West Broadway and between Vesey and Barclay Streets.

== History ==
90 Church Street was designed by Cross & Cross, Pennington, Lewis & Mills and Louis A. Simon, who was Supervising Architect of the Department of the Treasury at the time. The architectural style of the building is a mixture of Neo-classicism and Art Deco. It has two towers and the facade is clad in limestone. The AIA Guide to New York City described the building as "a boring limestone monolith that has trouble deciding between a heritage of stripped down neo-Classical and a new breath of Art Deco."

The construction of the building started in 1934 and was completed in 1937. There was a six stories addition on top in 1938.

It was added to the National Register of Historic Places in 1989. The building was extensively renovated by Boston Properties, Inc from the early 1990s though 2000 by Architects Swanke Hayden Connell Architects and Brannen Associates.

In addition to housing the Postal Service, the 90 Church Street building contains offices of the New York State Public Service Commission, the New York State Health Department, and the New York City Housing Authority.

=== September 11 attacks ===
The building suffered moderate damage during the September 11 attacks due to a remnant of one of the planes and other debris landing on top of the building. Following the collapse of the World Trade Center's twin towers, the building's facade was damaged, windows were broken, the roof was seriously burned and major water damage occurred throughout the internal structure. It was also extensively contaminated with asbestos, lead dust, fungi, fiberglass dust, mercury, and bacteria. The building was entirely engulfed by dust after the collapse of both buildings, respectively, and was further damaged when Building 7 collapsed later the same day. There was no major structural damage. During recovery efforts at Ground Zero, the United States Postal Service worked to return individual pieces of mail found by rescue workers to the addressees. In August 2004, the Church Street Station Post Office reopened, and mail was once again being processed there. Church Street Station also serves the 10007 ZIP code, covering portions of Battery Park City, Tribeca, and Civic Center.
