= Seventh =

Seventh is the ordinal form of the number seven.

Seventh may refer to:

- Seventh Amendment to the United States Constitution
- A fraction, 1/7, equal to one of seven equal parts

== Film and television ==
- "The Seventh", a second-season episode of Star Trek: Enterprise

== Music ==
- A seventh (interval), the difference between two pitches
  - Diminished seventh, a chromatically reduced minor seventh interval
  - Major seventh, the larger of two commonly occurring musical intervals that span seven diatonic scale degrees
  - Minor seventh, the smaller of two commonly occurring musical intervals that span seven diatonic scale degrees
  - Harmonic seventh, the interval of exactly 4:7, whose approximation to the minor seventh in equal temperament explains the "sweetness" of the dominant seventh chord in a major key
  - Augmented seventh, an interval
- Leading-tone or subtonic, the seventh degree and the chord built on the seventh degree
- Seventh chord, a chord consisting of a triad plus a note forming an interval of a seventh above the chord root
- Seventh (chord), a factor of a chord
- Seventh, an Australian independent band who provided music for the 2001 video game Operation Flashpoint: Cold War Crisis
- The Seventh, stage name of American football player and singer-songwriter Chris Paul (offensive lineman)

== Places ==
- 7th meridian east, a line of longitude extending through Europe and Africa
- 7th meridian west, a line of longitude extending through Europe and Africa
- 7th parallel north, a circle of latitude above the Equator
- 7th parallel south, a circle of latitude below the Equator
- 7th Street (disambiguation)
- Seventh Avenue (disambiguation)

== Time ==
- 7th century
- 7th century BC

=== Dates ===
- Seventh of the month, a recurring calendar date
  - Seventh of January
  - Seventh of February
  - Seventh of March
  - Seventh of April
  - Seventh of May
  - Seventh of June
  - Seventh of July
  - Seventh of August
  - Seventh of September
  - Seventh of October
  - Seventh of November
  - Seventh of December

== Other uses ==
- 7th (gang), street gang in London

== See also ==
- Seventh Army (disambiguation)
- Seventh Avenue (disambiguation)
- Seventh day (disambiguation)
- Seventh Generation (disambiguation)
- Seventh Heaven (disambiguation)
- Seventh Sea (disambiguation)
- Seventh son of a seventh son (folk concept)
- Seventh Son of a Seventh Son (music album)
- 1/7 (disambiguation)
