= Settimo =

Settimo (Italian for seventh) may refer to several places in Italy:

- Settimo Milanese, a municipality in the Province of Milan
- Settimo Rottaro, a municipality in the Province of Turin
- Settimo San Pietro, a municipality in the Province of Cagliari
- Settimo Torinese, a municipality in the Province of Turin
  - SSD Settimo Calcio, a football club in Settimo Torinese
- Settimo Vittone, a municipality in the Province of Turin
- Settimo, a frazione of Cinto Caomaggiore, in the Province of Venice
