= Fifth Avenue/53rd Street station =

New York City Subway station in Manhattan

5 Avenue/53 Street
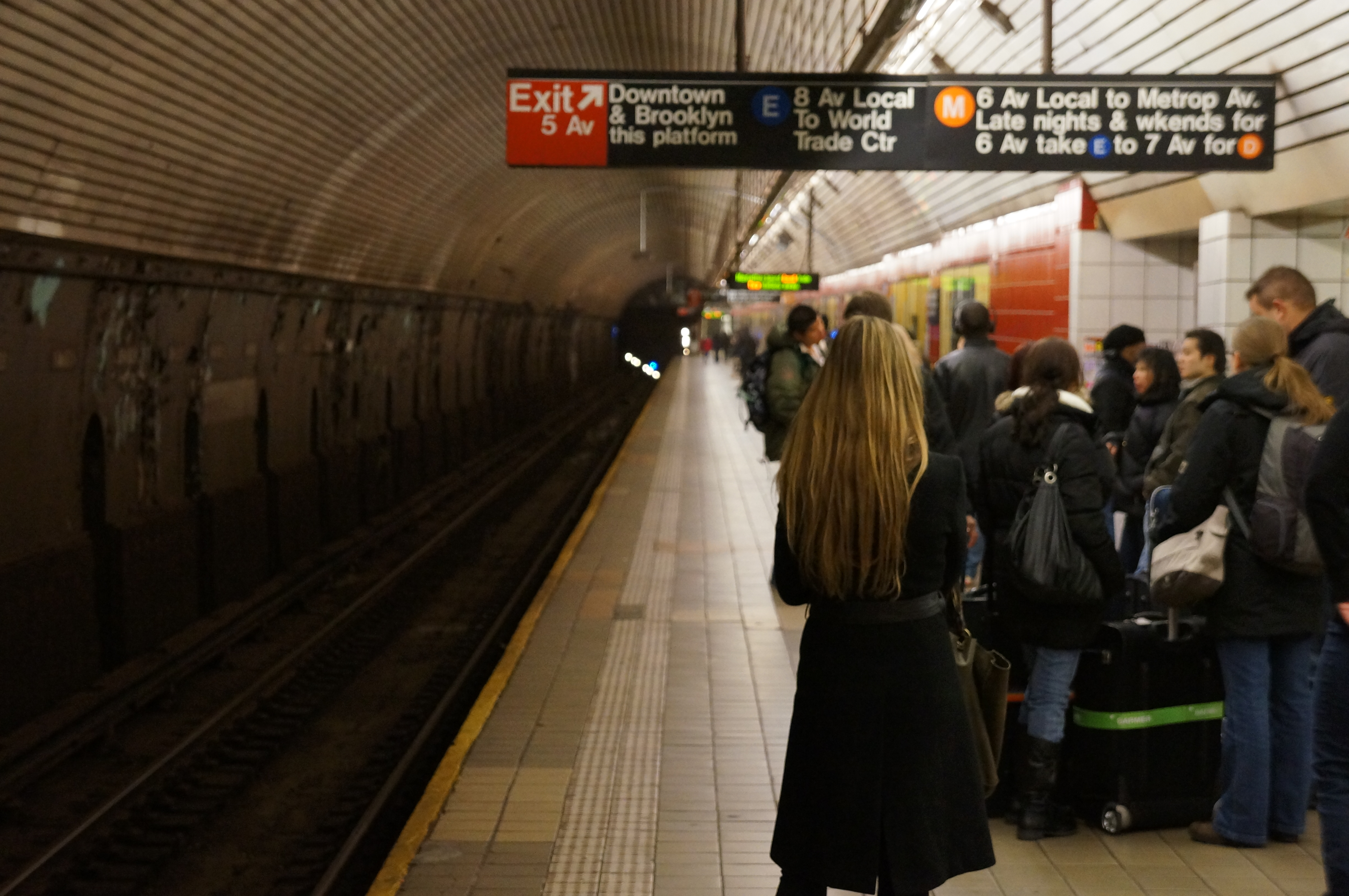
- People waiting for a train on the upper level platform

Station statistics
- Address: Fifth Avenue & 53rd Street; New York, New York
- Borough: Manhattan
- Locale: Midtown Manhattan
- Coordinates: 40.76028°N 73.97556°W
- Division: B (IND)
- Line: IND Queens Boulevard Line
- Services: E (all times); F (weekday) <F> (two rush hour trains, peak direction)
- Transit: NYCT Bus: M1, M2, M3, M4, M5, X27, X28, X37, X38, SIM1C, SIM3, SIM3C, SIM4C, SIM6, SIM8, SIM10, SIM22, SIM23, SIM24, SIM25, SIM26, SIM30, SIM31, SIM33C; MTA Bus: Q32, BxM3, BxM4, BxM11, BM1, BM2, BM3, BM4, BM5
- Structure: Underground
- Levels: 2
- Platforms: 2 stacked side platforms (1 on each level)
- Tracks: 2 (1 on each level)

Other information
- Opened: August 19, 1933; 93 years ago
- Accessible: No; planned
- Accessibility: Same-platform transfer available

Traffic
- 2025: 4,173,272 ▼8.8%
- Rank: 82 out of 423
Services
| Preceding station | New York City Subway | Following station |
|---|---|---|
| Seventh Avenue E toward World Trade Center | E (New York City Subway service) | Lexington Avenue–53rd Street E F <F> via Forest Hills–71st Avenue |
| 47th–50th Streets–Rockefeller Center F <F> toward Coney Island–Stillwell Avenue | F (New York City Subway service) | Lexington Avenue–53rd Street E F <F> via Forest Hills–71st Avenue |
Location
Location within New York City Subway
Location within New York City
Location within New York
Track layout
Street map
Station service legend
| Symbol | Description |
| Stops all times | Stops all times |
| Stops weekdays during the day | Stops weekdays during the day |

The Fifth Avenue/53rd Street station is a station on the IND Queens Boulevard Line of the New York City Subway. Located at the intersection of Fifth Avenue and 53rd Street in Manhattan, it is served by the E train at all times, the F train weekdays during the day, and the <F> train during rush hours in the peak direction.

Fifth Avenue/53rd Street was opened in 1933 as part of the Independent Subway System's (IND) Queens Boulevard Line. It contains two side platforms on separate levels: southbound trains to Lower Manhattan use the upper level, while northbound trains to Queens use the lower level. The station was renovated in the 1980s as part of the Metropolitan Transportation Authority's Culture Stations program and was rebuilt with displays showing information about the cultural institutions in the area. Further improvements to the station were proposed in the 2010s.

== History ==
=== Opening and early years ===
The Queens Boulevard Line was one of the first built by the city-owned Independent Subway System (IND), and was planned to stretch between the IND Eighth Avenue Line in Manhattan and 178th Street and Hillside Avenue in Jamaica, Queens, with a stop at Fifth Avenue. The line was first proposed in 1925. Bids for the 53rd Street subway tunnel were received in October 1926, and work started in April 1927. The 53rd Street Tunnel was fully excavated between Queens and Manhattan in January 1929.

The Fifth Avenue/53rd Street station opened on August 19, 1933 with the opening of the IND Queens Boulevard Line to Roosevelt Avenue in Queens. Service was initially provided by E trains running via the IND Eighth Avenue Line. On December 15, 1940, the IND Sixth Avenue Line opened between West Fourth Street–Washington Square and 59th Street–Columbus Circle. On this date, F trains began using this station, diverging west of the station onto the Sixth Avenue Line.

In 1959, a project started to replace the four 2-foot-wide (0.61 m) escalators with new wider 4-foot-wide (1.2 m) escalators—two at the Madison Avenue end of the station, and two at the Fifth Avenue end. The new 94-foot (29 m) long escalators were intended to increase capacity, and could run at speeds of 90 or 120 feet (27 or 37 m) per minute. On September 8, 1959, the first of the four new 4-foot-wide escalators was put into place at the Madison Avenue entrance, replacing one of the 2-foot-wide escalators. The entire project cost $1.2 million. As part of the project, other improvements were made: the lighting at the station was replaced with fluorescent lighting, and the stairways at the station were moved.

=== Renovation ===
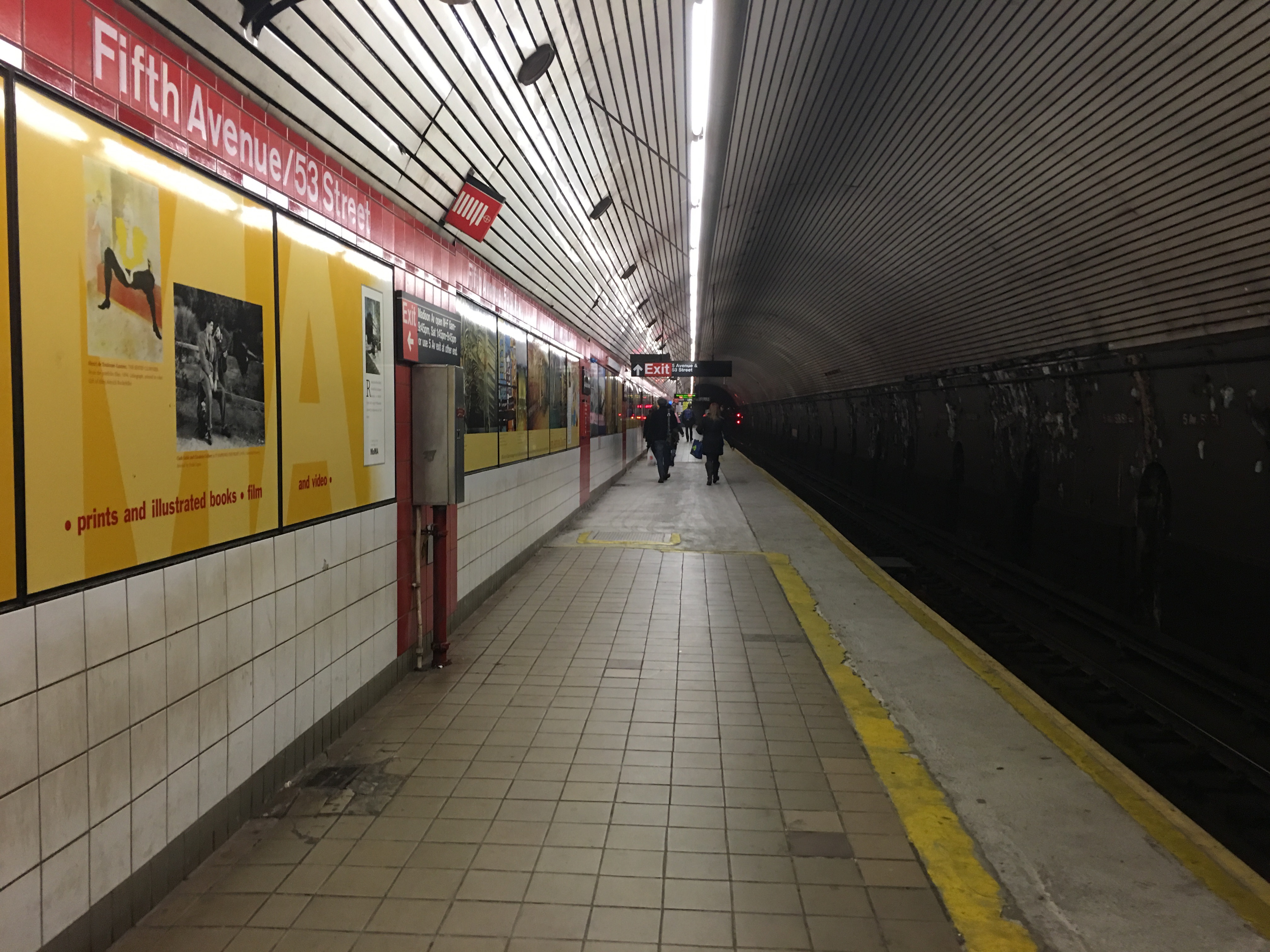
A view of the displays added during the station renovation on the downtown platform

In 1981, the Metropolitan Transportation Authority (MTA) listed the station among the 69 most deteriorated stations in the subway system. That same year, the MTA announced the creation of its Culture Stations program to install public art in the subway. The Culture Stations program was started to deter graffiti, and was inspired by legislation in the New York City Council that mandated that 1% of the cost of constructing public buildings be used for art. The program was modelled on the Louvre – Rivoli station on the Paris Métro, which featured reproductions of the artwork on display in the Louvre. Four stations, namely Fifth Avenue/53rd Street, Astor Place, Eastern Parkway–Brooklyn Museum and 66th Street–Lincoln Center, were selected for the program due to their proximity to cultural institutions, and would be among the first stations part of the MTA's new station refurbishment program, which began in 1982. The Fifth Avenue station was chosen for its proximity to five museums, the New York Public Library Main Branch, and major corporations.

The stations in the Culture Stations program were to be completed by making use of both private and public funding. This station was redesigned by Lee Harris Pomeroy Architects. The modernization project was opened to bidders on November 9, 1982, and was expected to cost between $4 and $6 million. Some funding for the renovation came from a $66 million grant that the Urban Mass Transportation Administration had given to the New York City Transit Authority in 1982. In addition, Fisher Brothers (the developers of the nearby Park Avenue Plaza office building) had contributed $100,000 to a special fund for improvements to the Fifth Avenue/53rd Street station.

Design work was completed in 1983. The renovation was originally scheduled to be complete in December 1984 but was pushed back by two years. As part of the renovation, 400-foot-long (120 m) rows of light boxes containing displays showing information about objects in nearby museums such as the Museum of Modern Art (MoMA), as well as points of interest in the vicinity, were installed on each platform. The light boxes were designed by the project's graphic designers, Pentagram. The walls adjacent to each platform were redecorated with red and white tiles. In addition, to prevent water seepage and to reduce noise, double layered metal linings were installed in the station. Architectural writer Paul Goldberger criticized the new design, saying: "Despite the good, there is little to relate that station as a work of design either to the architecture of the surrounding neighborhood or to the tradition of the New York subway."

In 1996, Ralph Fasanella's 1950 painting "Subway Riders" was installed outside fare control in the full-time mezzanine. It was the first oil painting installed in a subway station in New York City. Fasanella had donated it to the American Folk Art Museum on the condition that it stay permanently displayed in the subway under the MTA Arts & Design program, saying, "I'd rather have people see this painting in the subway than any museum." In 2014, "Subway Riders" was temporarily removed and placed in a traveling exhibition called "Self Taught Genius: Treasures From the American Folk Art Museum".

=== Proposed improvements ===
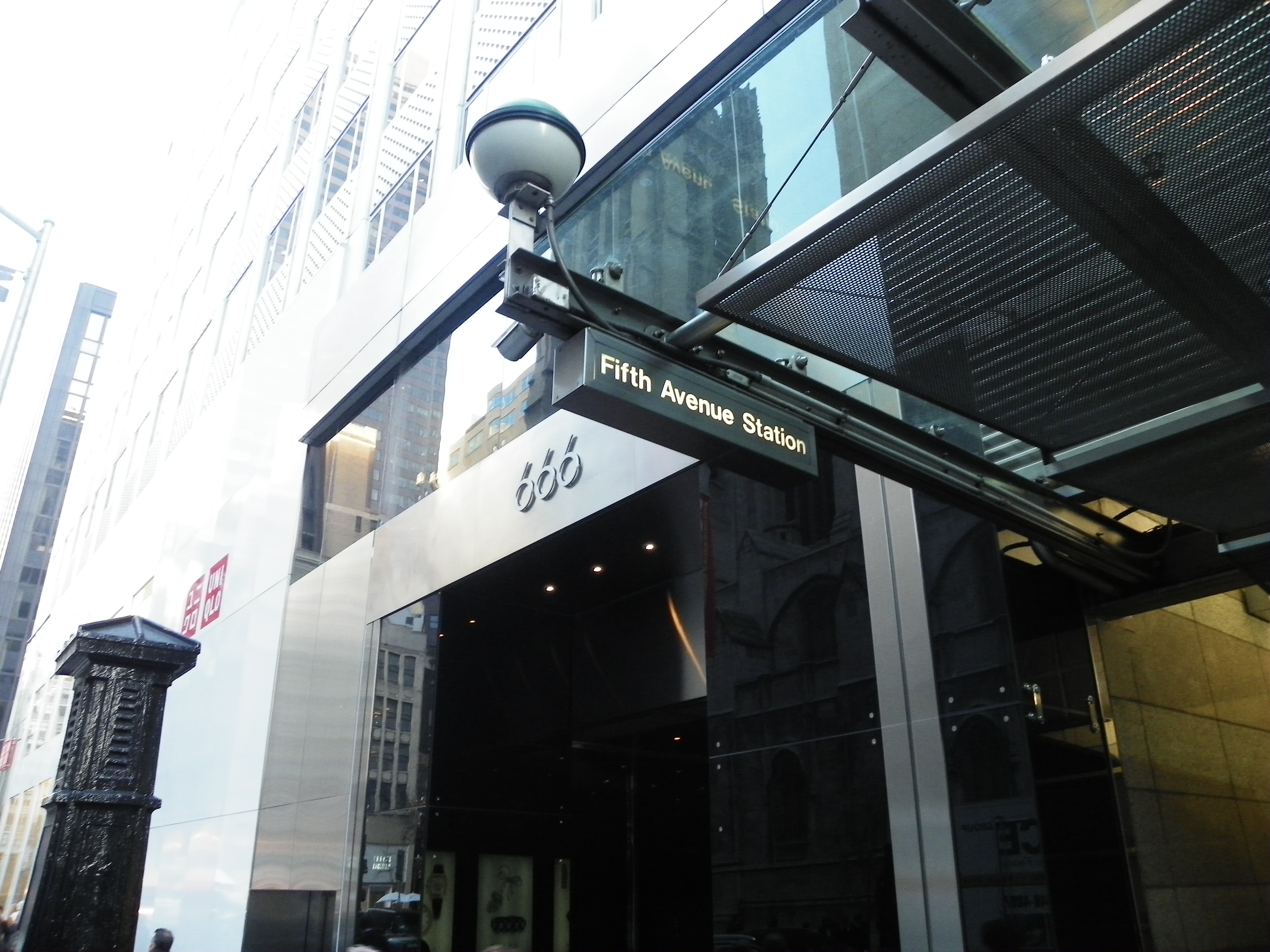
Entrance to the station in 660 Fifth Avenue, near the southwest corner of 53rd Street and Fifth Avenue

As part of the rezoning of East Midtown, which was approved in 2017, developers were permitted to construct buildings at the maximum permitted floor area ratio if they transferred landmark development rights, rebuilt overbuilt floor area, or made pre-identified improvements to subway stations in the area. The six stations chosen for improvements (Grand Central–42nd Street, Lexington Avenue/51st Street, 42nd Street–Bryant Park/Fifth Avenue, 47th–50th Streets–Rockefeller Center, Lexington Avenue/59th Street, and Fifth Avenue/53rd Street) were prioritized due to high ridership. Improvement projects include making stations compliant with the Americans with Disabilities Act of 1990, improving circulation and wayfinding, and reducing congestion by constructing new entrances, or by installing escalators and wider staircases. A list of three levels of improvements were created by the MTA and the New York City Department of City Planning. Type 1 improvements would give a developer 40,000 square feet (3,700 m^{2}) of additional floor area, Type 2 improvements would give them an additional 80,000 square feet (7,400 m^{2}), and Type 3 improvements would give them an additional 120,000 square feet (11,000 m^{2}).

Initially, in 2012, two improvements were considered for the Fifth Avenue station. These would entail adding or widening stairs between the upper and lower level platform at the east end of the station, and adding or widening the escalators between the upper level platform and the Madison Avenue mezzanine. The main reasoning for the first of the two improvements was because that staircase is over capacity, clearing in 75 seconds during the morning rush hour, greater than the 45 second guideline. The reasoning of the second was because the escalators are at capacity, and would become over capacity if the capacity of the staircase between the two levels was increased.

As approved, the East Midtown rezoning provides for one Type 1 improvement and five Type 2 improvements at this station. The Type 1 improvement would entail constructing a new street entrance on 53rd Street west of Madison Avenue. One of the Type 2 improvements would be the construction of a new staircase between the upper level platform and the mezzanine, as well as a new staircase between the upper and lower level platforms. Developers could also elect to install an elevator between the mezzanine and the two platforms. Another potential improvement would be the installation of two escalators between the upper level platform and the mezzanine. The proposed Type 2 improvements also include the construction of a new mezzanine under 53rd Street with a new fare control area to accommodate the new entrance west of Madison Avenue and a new access core. This access core would be constructed in a separate project and would provide access between the new entrance and the platforms, accommodating new staircases, an elevator and escalators. These improvements would be funded by the Extell Development Company, which sought permission to construct a tower of up to 1,100 ft (340 m) tall on Fifth Avenue between 46th and 47th Streets.

=== Service history ===
When the station opened, it was served by E trains running to Hudson Terminal (today's World Trade Center) in Manhattan. In 1940, F trains began serving the station, running via the newly opened IND Sixth Avenue Line. On December 16, 2001, the connection to the IND 63rd Street Line opened, and the F was rerouted onto it. The new peak-hour V train was created to replace the F via 53rd Street while running local on Queens Boulevard. On June 27, 2010, V service was eliminated and replaced by the M train. On December 8, 2025, the F and <F> express trains began serving the station on weekdays during the day, running via the 53rd Street Tunnel. The M train began running via the 63rd Street Tunnel during weekdays when it runs to Queens.

== Station layout ==
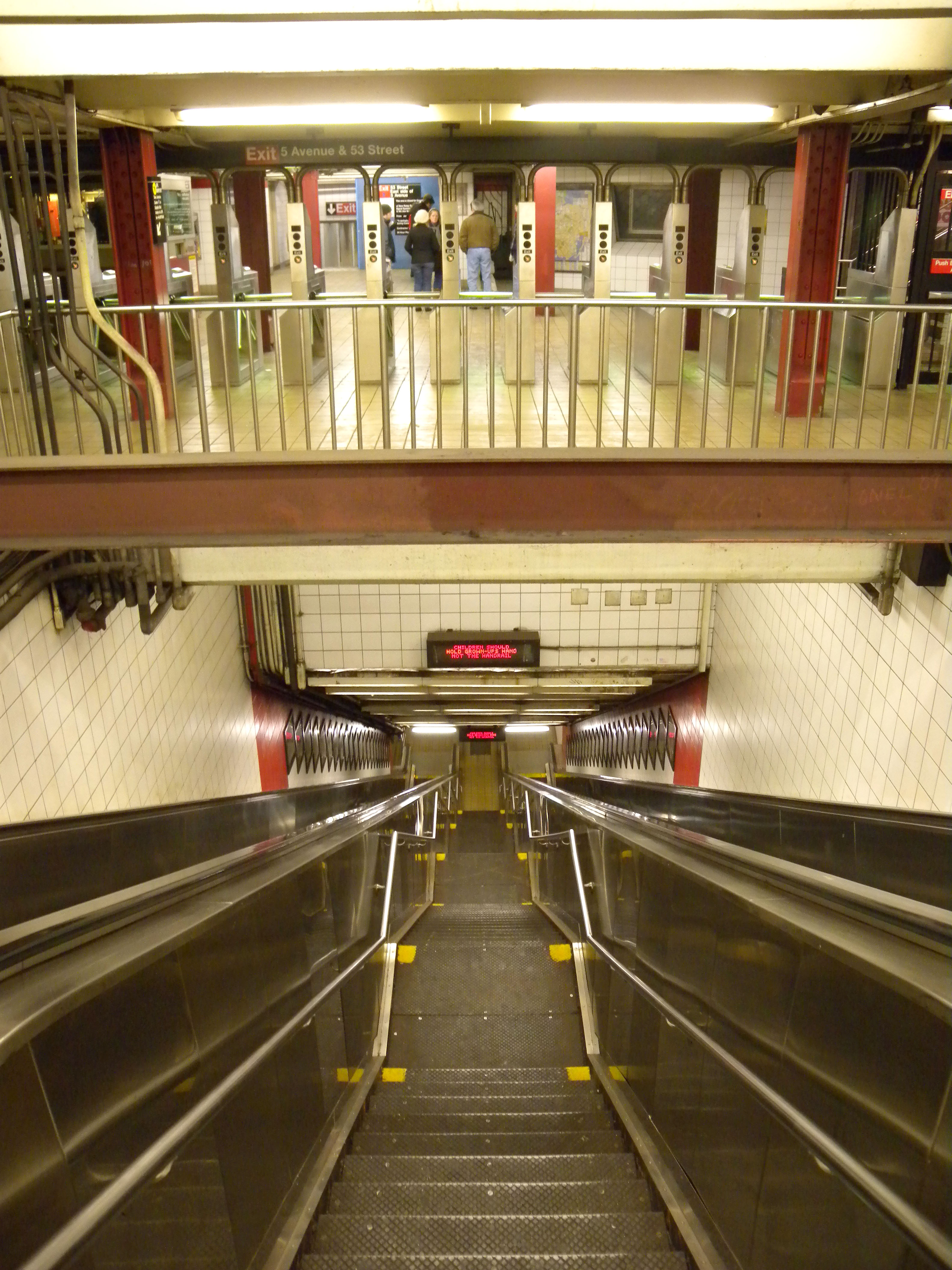
Long stairway and escalators between fare control mezzanine and upper level platform

This underground station has two levels, with the upper level serving trains bound for Lower Manhattan and the lower level serving trains bound for Queens. Each level has one track and one side platform. The E train serves the station at all times, while the F train serves the station on weekdays during the day. Limited <F> trains serve the station northbound during AM rush hours and southbound during PM rush hours. The next station to the north is Lexington Avenue–53rd Street, while the next station to the south is 47th–50th Streets–Rockefeller Center for F and <F> trains and Seventh Avenue for E trains.

The upper level, built in a tube design, is 59 feet (18 m) below street level while the lower level is 80 feet (24 m) below. Staircases connect each level at both ends. There is a junction just west (railroad south) of this station that is controlled by a tower on the south end of the upper level platform. E trains continue west along 53rd Street while F trains turn south and enter the IND Sixth Avenue Line.

The southbound platform contains an exhibit called The Subway: Design for a Modern Icon, developed by the MTA in conjunction with MoMA. Installed in January 2020, it contains excerpts of icons used throughout the New York City Subway system. These include several pages of the "New York City Transit Authority Graphic Standards Manual", portions of the 1972 New York City Subway map, a visual timeline, and quotations.

=== Exits ===
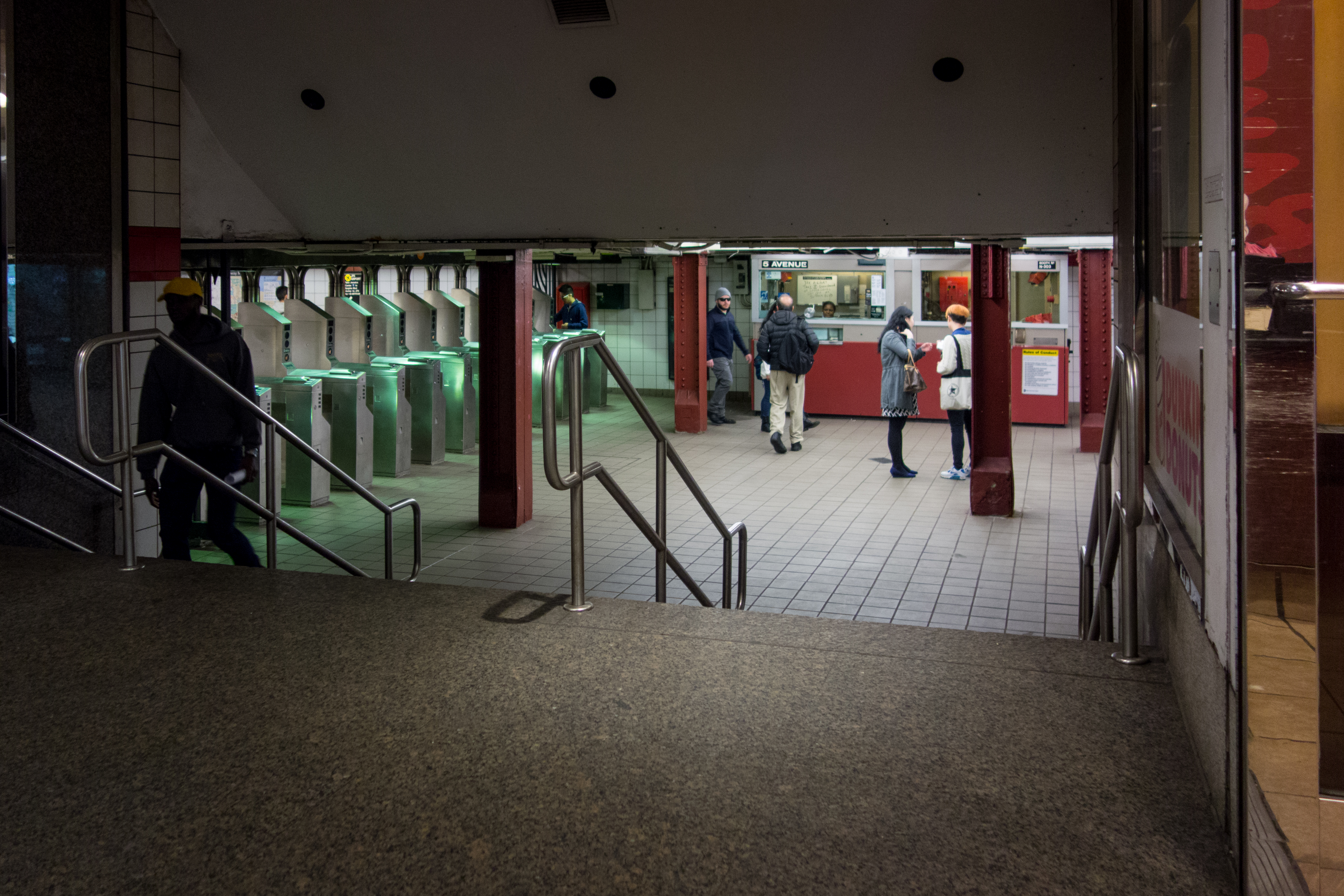
View of the station's main fare control area at Fifth Avenue

The station has two entrances/exits. The full-time exit at Fifth Avenue is at the west (railroad south) end of the platform level. Two 94-foot (29 m) long escalators and one staircase go up to a turnstile bank, where a token booth is present. A passageway leads to two staircases going up to the eastern corners of Fifth Avenue and 53rd Street. There is another staircase that leads to the underground shopping arcade of 660 Fifth Avenue, which has an entrance/exit on the south side of 53rd Street west of Fifth Avenue.

The part-time entrance/exit leads to Madison Avenue and is located at the east (railroad north) end of the station, one of which leads directly next to the basement and entrance of 515 Madison Avenue. This exit has a turnstile bank, customer assistance booth, and two staircases, both of which are built within underground shopping arcades, going up to both eastern corners of Madison Avenue and 53rd Street. Two 94-foot (29 m) long escalators connect the upper-level platform and the mezzanine.

The part-time exit is only open on weekdays and Saturdays until 9:45 p.m. The street-level gates to the station were owned by private companies who formerly closed them at 9 p.m. However, MTA workers did not close the platform-level gates until 10 p.m. During the hour in between the two gates' closures, exiting passengers often became trapped after passing through the turnstiles, forcing them to go back into the subway, either paying another fare or jumping the turnstiles. After the MTA was informed of the issue in 2013, it arranged with the building owners to keep the exit open until 9:45 p.m. and the signs in the station were updated accordingly.

== Notable places nearby ==
The Fifth Avenue/53rd Street station is within three blocks of numerous notable locations.

Places to the south include:

- 660 Fifth Avenue
- Austrian Cultural Forum New York
- CBS Building
- House at 651 Fifth Avenue
- Look Building
- Olympic Tower
- Paley Center for Media
- St. Patrick's Cathedral
- Villard Houses

Places to the north include:

- 550 Madison Avenue, former Sony Building
- 689 Fifth Avenue, former Aeolian Building
- 712 Fifth Avenue
- Fifth Avenue Presbyterian Church
- Friars Club
- Houses at 5, 7, 11, 13 and 15 West 54th Street; 4 and 19 East 54th Street
- Lever House
- Museum of Modern Art
- Park Avenue Plaza
- Paley Park
- Peninsula Hotel
- Racquet and Tennis Club
- Rockefeller Apartments
- St. Regis Hotel
- Saint Thomas Church
- Trump Tower
- University Club of New York
