= 7/1 =

7/1 may refer to:

- July 1 (month-day date notation)
- January 7 (day-month date notation)
- A form of septuple meter
- The scoreline of the 2014 FIFA World Cup semifinal between hosts Brazil and eventual winners Germany

== See also ==
- 1/7 (disambiguation)
- Matthew 7:1
