= 1/7 =

1/7 or 1-7 most commonly refers to 1/7 (number), a fraction (one seventh, 1/7)

1/7 may also refer to:

- January 7 (month-day date notation)
- 1 July (day-month date notation)
- 1st Battalion 7th Marines, an infantry battalion of the 7th Marine Regiment of the US Marine Corps
- 7th Battalion (1st British Columbia), CEF
- 1 shilling and 7 pence in UK predecimal currency
- Schweizer SGU 1-7

== See also ==
- 7/1 (disambiguation)
- Angiotensin (1-7)
- Seventh (disambiguation)
