= 7th Street =

7th Street may refer to:

== Urban roadways ==
- 7th Street (Johannesburg), South Africa
- 7th Street (New York City), a street in Manhattan, United States
- 7th Street (Washington, D.C.), United States
- Carrera Séptima (7th Street), a street in Bogotá, Colombia

== Other ==
- Seventh Street (horse), an American Thoroughbred racehorse
- "7th Street", final round, also known as River (poker), of cards in 7-card stud
- 7th Street station (disambiguation), train stations of the name
- 7th Street Burger, an American fast-food restaurant chain

== See also ==
- 7th Street Entry, Minnesota music venue
