= 47th–50th Streets–Rockefeller Center station =

New York City Subway station in Manhattan

47–50 Streets–Rockefeller Center
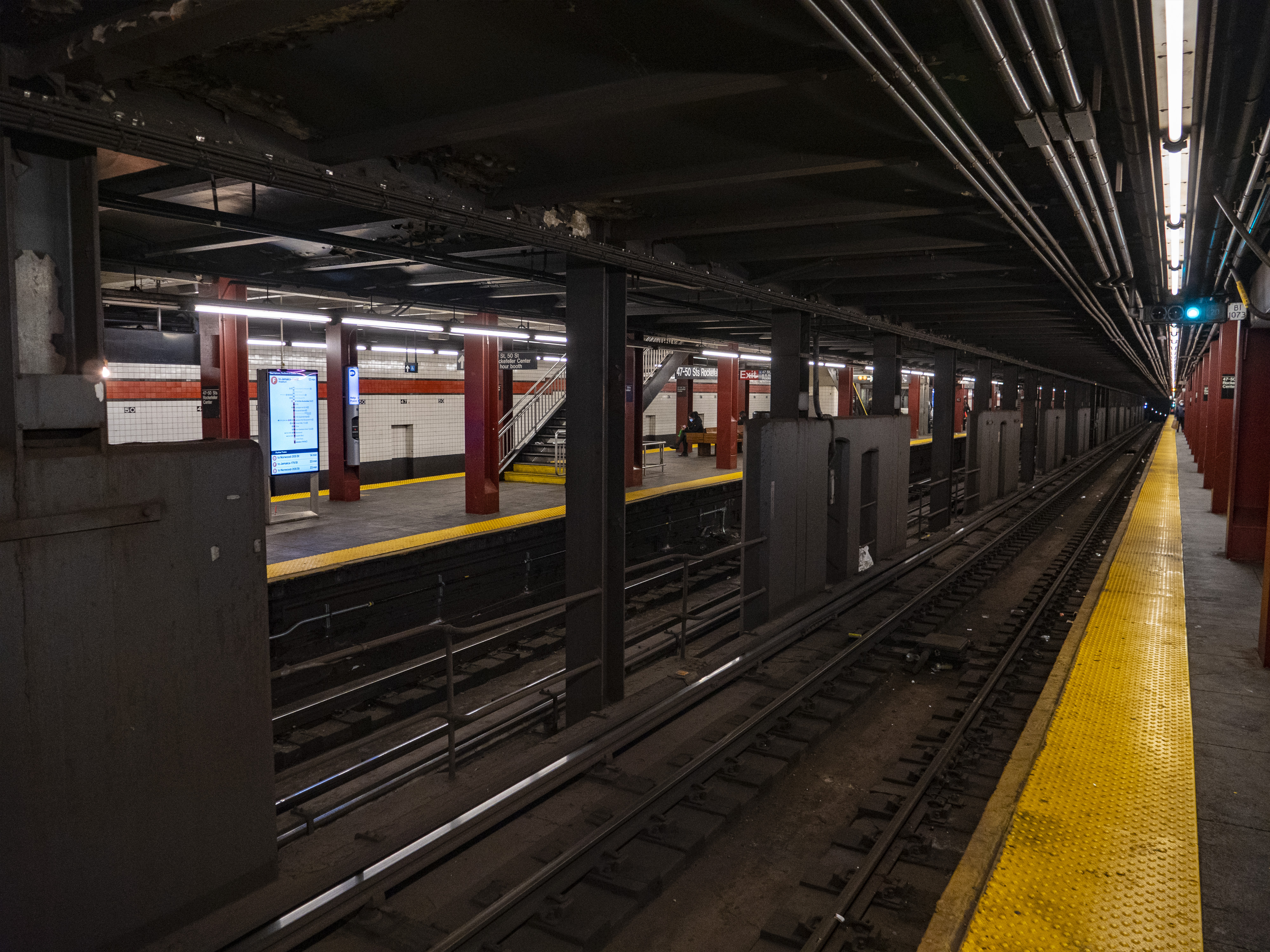
- View from southbound platform

Station statistics
- Address: Sixth Avenue between West 47th Street & West 50th Street; New York, New York
- Borough: Manhattan
- Locale: Midtown Manhattan
- Coordinates: 40.758603°N 73.981376°W
- Division: B (IND)
- Line: IND Sixth Avenue Line
- Services: B (weekdays during the day); D (all times); F (all times) <F> (two rush hour trains, peak direction); M (weekdays during the day)
- Transit: NYCT Bus: M5, M7, M50, SIM1C, SIM3, SIM3C, SIM10; MTA Bus: BxM2, QM1, QM2, QM4, QM5, QM6, QM20
- Structure: Underground
- Platforms: 2 island platforms cross-platform interchange
- Tracks: 4

Other information
- Opened: December 15, 1940; 85 years ago
- Accessible: Yes

Traffic
- 2025: 13,526,667 ▲8.9%
- Rank: 12 out of 423
Services
Preceding station	New York City Subway	Following station
Seventh Avenue B D via 59th Street–Columbus Circle	Express	42nd Street–Bryant Park B D F <F> M via Broadway–Lafayette Street
Fifth Avenue/53rd Street F <F> toward Jamaica–179th Street	Local	42nd Street–Bryant Park B D F <F> M via Broadway–Lafayette Street
57th Street F M toward Forest Hills–71st Avenue	Local	42nd Street–Bryant Park B D F <F> M via Broadway–Lafayette Street
Former services
Preceding station	New York City Subway	Following station
57th Street toward 21st Street–Queensbridge	JFK Express	42nd Street–Bryant Park toward Howard Beach–JFK Airport
Location
Location within New York City Subway
Location within New York City
Location within New York
Track layout
Street map
Station service legend
Symbol	Description
Stops all times	Stops all times
Stops all times except late nights	Stops all times except late nights
Stops weekdays during the day	Stops weekdays during the day
Stops rush hours in the peak direction only (limited service)	Stops rush hours in the peak direction only (limited service)
Stops late nights and weekends	Stops late nights and weekends

The 47th–50th Streets–Rockefeller Center station (formerly 47th Street–50th Street–Rockefeller Center) is an express station on the IND Sixth Avenue Line of the New York City Subway. It is located along Sixth Avenue (Avenue of the Americas) between 47th and 50th Streets, on the west side of Rockefeller Center. The station is served by the D and F trains at all times, the B and M trains on weekdays, and the <F> train during rush hours in the peak direction. In 2019, it was the 12th busiest subway station in the system.

The Rockefeller Center station was built for the Independent Subway System (IND), which had first proposed constructing a line under Sixth Avenue in 1924. The line's construction was delayed by a decade due to negotiations with the Hudson & Manhattan Railroad. A contract for the line segment that includes the Rockefeller Center station was awarded in 1936. The station opened on December 15, 1940, and its mezzanine was expanded in the late 1950s and the early 1970s. The New York City Transit Authority proposed renovating the Rockefeller Center station in the 1990s, but the station still has not been renovated as of 2024.

The 47th–50th Streets–Rockefeller Center station contains two island platforms and four tracks. The northbound platform has the traditional arrangement of local service on the outside track and express service on the inside track, but the southbound platform reverses this (local on the inside, express on the outside). There is a full mezzanine above the station, connecting with Rockefeller Center. The station contains elevators, which make the station compliant with the Americans with Disabilities Act of 1990. The tracks diverge to the Eighth Avenue, 53rd Street, and 63rd Street lines to the north, and the southbound tracks cross over each other to the south.

== History ==
=== Construction ===
New York City mayor John Francis Hylan's original plans for the Independent Subway System (IND), proposed in 1922, included building over 100 miles (160 km) of new lines and taking over nearly 100 miles (160 km) of existing lines. The lines were designed to compete with the existing underground, surface, and elevated lines operated by the Interborough Rapid Transit Company (IRT) and Brooklyn–Manhattan Transit Corporation (BMT). The IND Sixth Avenue Line was designed to replace the elevated IRT Sixth Avenue Line. In 1924, the IND submitted its list of proposed subway routes to the New York City Board of Transportation (BOT), which approved the program. One of the routes was a segment of tunnel from Fourth Street to 53rd Street. Part of this stretch was already occupied by the Hudson & Manhattan Railroad (H&M)'s Uptown Hudson Tubes. As a result, negotiations between the city and the H&M continued for several years. The IND and H&M finally came to an agreement in 1930. The city had decided to build the IND Sixth Avenue Line's local tracks around the pre-existing H&M tubes, and add express tracks for the IND underneath the H&M tubes at a later date. Also in 1930, the BOT identified the locations of 104 stations to be built in the IND system. Under this plan, there would have been an express station at Sixth Avenue and 50th Street.

The IND started advertising bids for the section of the Sixth Avenue Line between 43rd and 53rd Streets in April 1931. In April 1935, engineers started planning in earnest for the Midtown portion of the Sixth Avenue Line. The city government issued corporate stock to pay for the $53 million cost of the project, since the line was not eligible for federal Public Works Administration funds. The first contract, for the section between 40th and 47th Streets (just south of the Rockefeller Center station), was awarded to Rosoff-Brader Construction in October 1935. Mayor Fiorello H. La Guardia broke ground for the Sixth Avenue subway at Bryant Park on March 23, 1936. As part of the first phase of the project, the contractors built a compressor plant and a shaft at 46th Street. In November 1936, the George A. Flynn Corporation received a $4,616,476 contract for the construction of the section between 47th and 53rd Streets.

The line was built as a four-track tunnel north of 33rd Street (including the Rockefeller Center station), but there were only two tracks south of that street. The work largely involved cut-and-cover excavations, although portions of the subway had to be tunneled through solid rock. The builders also had to avoid disrupting the Sixth Avenue elevated or the various utility lines on the avenue, and some of the utility pipes and wires under Sixth Avenue had to be replaced in the process. Excavation work was conducted 24 hours a day, with most of the blasting work being conducted at night. Workers used small charges of dynamite to avoid damaging nearby buildings or the Catskill Aqueduct, which ran below Sixth Avenue and was a major part of the New York City water supply system. The section north of 33rd Street had mostly been excavated by November 1937. By the beginning of the following year, the track junction north of the station was being constructed at a rate of 5 feet (1.5 m) per day. The IRT's Sixth Avenue elevated closed in December 1938, just before the Sixth Avenue subway was completed.

North of 47th–50th Streets, bellmouth tunnels were built to allow for a future extension under Central Park and along Morningside Avenue to 145th Street. The unbuilt extension was part of the Board of Transportation's long-range program and was budgeted at $34.914 million in August 1940. Construction was expected to start sometime after 1946. The bellmouths diverged from the local and express tracks on both the northbound and southbound sides of the station, with tunnels that stub-ended at 53rd Street. In the meantime, all express trains originally turned west toward the Seventh Avenue station and the Washington Heights Line, while local trains turned east toward the Fifth Avenue/53rd Street station and the Queens Boulevard Line.

=== Opening and use ===
==== 1940s to 1960s ====
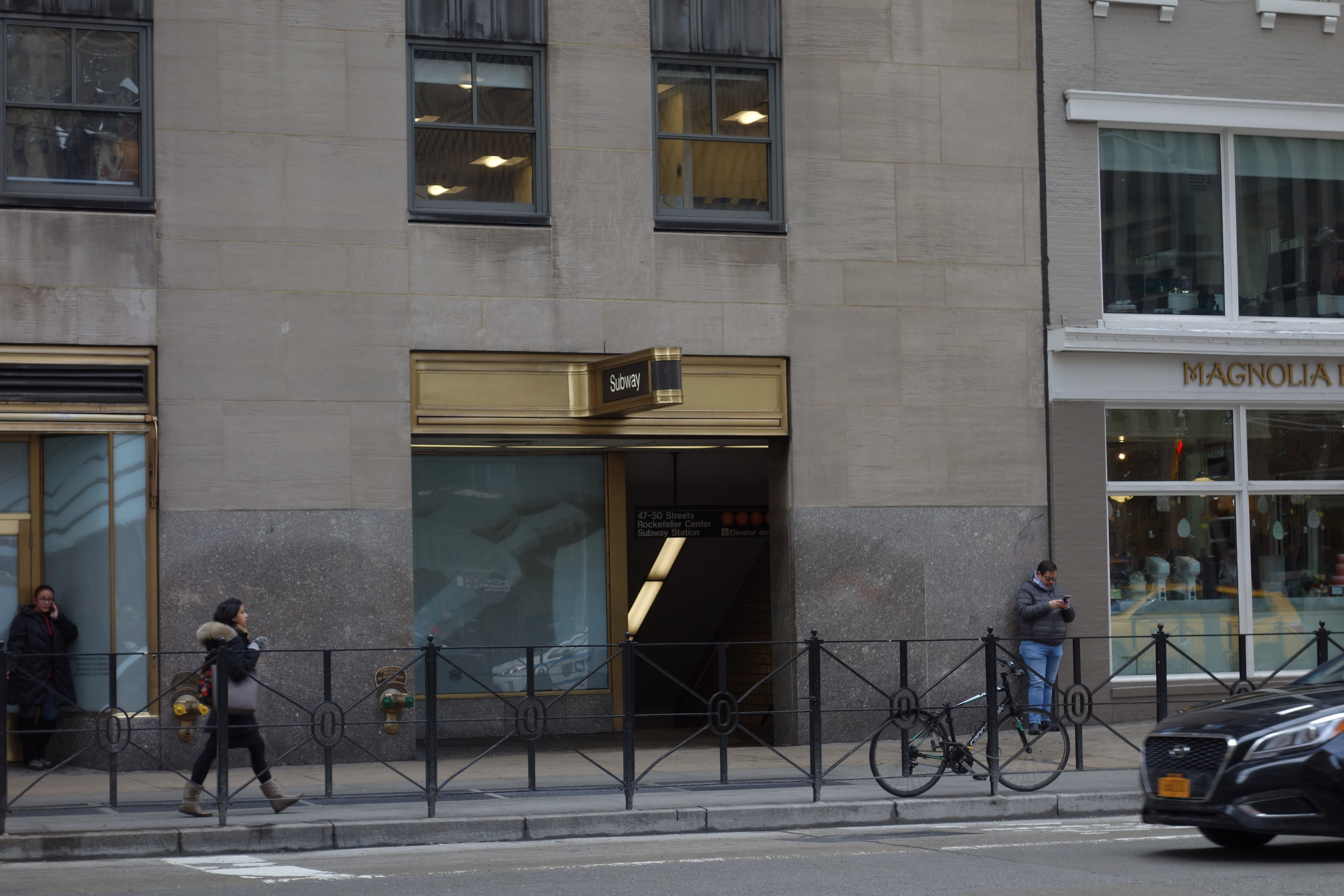
Entrance to the station inside 30 Rockefeller Plaza

The station opened on December 15, 1940, as part of the mainline portion of the IND Sixth Avenue Line to West Fourth Street–Washington Square. At the time, it was known as 47th Street–50th Street–Rockefeller Center. On the line's opening day, the Rockefeller Center station was the busiest of the six new stations. There were connections from the station's mezzanine to the basements of 1230 Sixth Avenue and 30 Rockefeller Plaza. The opening of the Sixth Avenue Line relieved train traffic on the Eighth Avenue Line, which was used by all IND services except for the GG Brooklyn–Queens Crosstown service. The BB train served part of the Sixth Avenue Line's midtown section during weekday rush hours only, running local between 168th Street and 34th Street–Herald Square. The entirety of the midtown section was served at all times by the D and F trains. In early 1949, the BOT announced that an automatic shoe-shine machine would be installed at the station as part of a pilot program. To improve cleanliness, the BOT also installed a "hygiaphone" at the station agent's booth; the device was composed of a transparent membrane and was meant to reduce the spread of germs.

Rockefeller Center Inc., the owners of Rockefeller Center, announced in 1956 that it would construct the Time-Life Building at 1271 Avenue of the Americas, with a passageway from the basement to the Rockefeller Center station. A similar passageway was built from the basement of 1285 Avenue of the Americas, one block north of the Time-Life Building. In February 1958, Rockefeller Center Inc. leased 15,000 square feet (1,400 m^{2}) in the northern mezzanine for 20 years at a total cost of $2 million over that period. Architects Harrison & Abramovitz were hired to redesign the mezzanine with stores similar to Rockefeller Center's underground mall. The renovation of the mezzanine was completed in February 1960, along with the passageway to 1271 Avenue of the Americas. Workers installed about 15,000 square feet (1,400 m^{2}) of asbestos floor tiles as part of the project, and they also installed white, gray, and black panels on the walls, ceilings, and columns.

The bellmouths north of the Rockefeller Center station went unused until 1962, when the New York City Transit Authority (NYCTA) announced it would extend the Sixth Avenue Line to 57th Street as part of the Chrystie Street Connection. Construction of the spur cost $13.2 million. With the completion of express tracks between West Fourth and 34th Streets in 1967, the B and D trains started running express on the Sixth Avenue Line. The 57th Street station opened in 1968, upon which KK trains began serving the Rockefeller Center station.

==== 1970s to present ====
As part of the construction of 1211, 1221, and 1251 Avenue of the Americas in the early 1970s, passageways were constructed from the basements of each building to the Rockefeller Center station. The new passageways had been completed by 1974. The NYCTA installed turnstiles and stairways to accommodate the additional passenger traffic, and Rockefeller Center Inc. paid for the improvements. An entrance with glazed-brick walls was added at 48th Street. In addition, Rockefeller Center Inc. built a passageway between 47th and 49th Streets, running parallel to the station's mezzanine. The station was also served by the JFK Express from 1978 to 1990 when it was discontinued.

The Metropolitan Transportation Authority (MTA) announced in 1990 that it would spend $730 million to renovate 74 subway stations, including the Rockefeller Center station. In 1994, amid a funding shortfall, the administration of mayor Rudy Giuliani proposed delaying the station's renovation. That October, the MTA announced it had indefinitely postponed plans for renovating the Rockefeller Center station. The station's token booths were shuttered in May 2005, after fare tokens were replaced with MetroCards; station agents were deployed elsewhere in the station to answer passengers' queries. This was part of a pilot program that was tested at seven other stations. By the mid-2000s, the New York City Transit Riders Council had ranked the Rockefeller Center station as among the system's dirtiest subway stations. The group described the station as having leaky ceilings, litter, dirty walls and floors, and water on the floor. The MTA again proposed renovating the station as part of its 2005–2009 capital program, but it postponed these plans in 2005 due to a lack of funding. Elevators between the mezzanine and either platform were installed in 2008–2009.

== Station layout ==
The 47th–50th Streets–Rockefeller Center station is an express stop with four tracks and two island platforms. The D and F stop here at all times, while the B and M stop here only on weekdays during the day. The B and D run on the express tracks and the F and M run on the local tracks. The next stop to the north is Seventh Avenue for B and D trains, 57th Street for M and weekend F trains, and Fifth Avenue/53rd Street for weekday F trains, while the next stop to the south is 42nd Street–Bryant Park for all service.

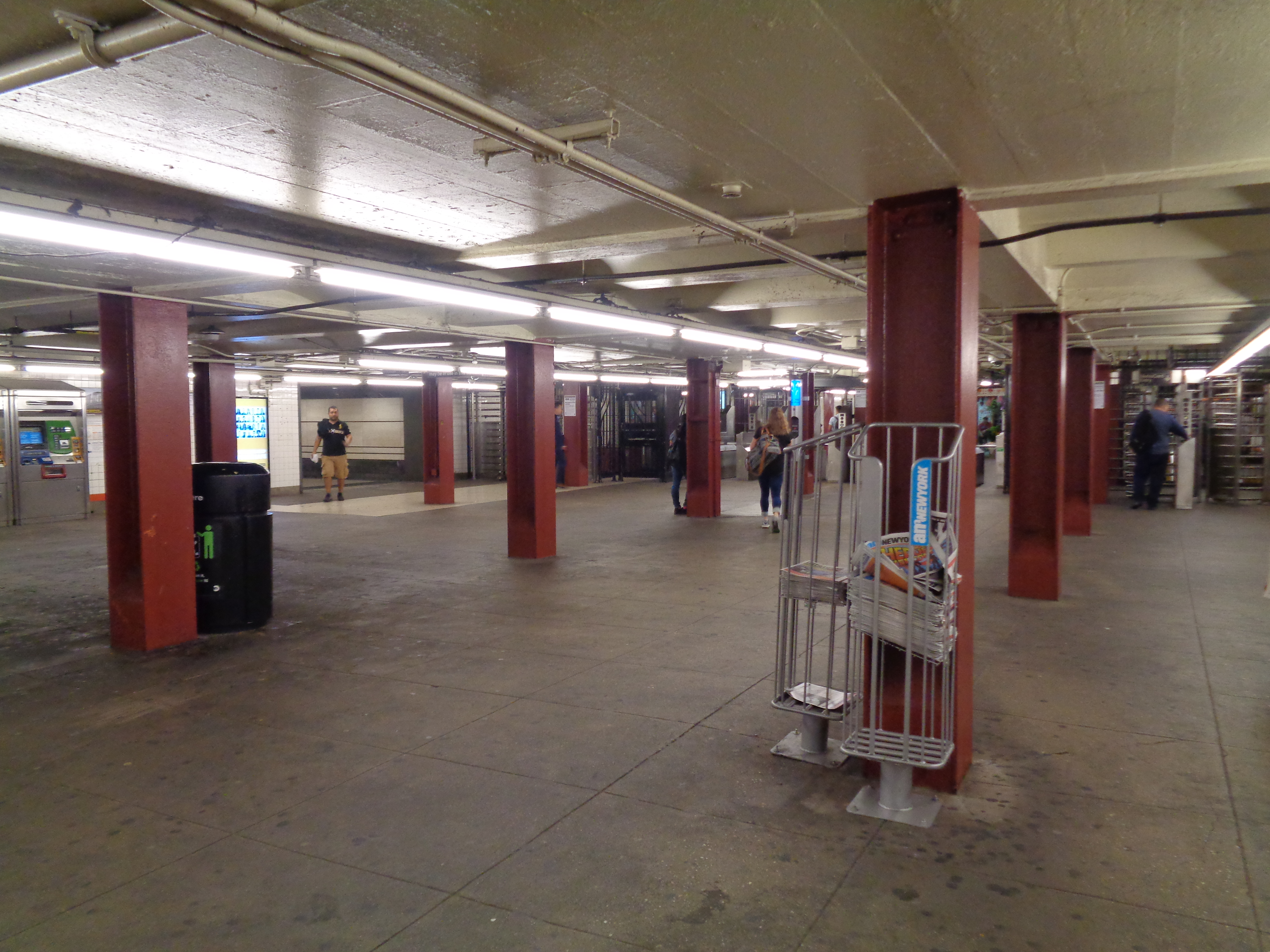
View of the station's mezzanine

A mezzanine runs above the entire length of the station. The 47th–50th Streets–Rockefeller Center station is fully wheelchair-accessible, with elevators connecting the street, mezzanine, and platforms. There are a total of fourteen stairs and two elevators from the mezzanine to the platforms. Each platform has seven stairs and one elevator. Rockefeller Center's underground mall, built in 1935 as part of the complex's construction, contains passageways to the station's mezzanine. The walls of the station contain red-tile bands bordered in chocolate brown. The tile colors are intended to help riders identify their station more easily, part of a color-coded tile system for the entire IND network.

=== Track layout ===
The westernmost track of either platform is used by express trains while the easternmost track is used by local trains. This is to avoid level junctions with the IND Queens Boulevard Line, which is perpendicular with the IND Sixth Avenue Line north of this station. As a result, the southbound tracks are the reverse of the New York City Subway's traditional local–express track arrangement, wherein the express track is outside and the local track is inside. To the north of the station, the line splits into two levels. Express trains come from the Bronx via a connection from the IND Eighth Avenue Line while local trains come from Queens via the 53rd Street Tunnel. Both the local and the express tracks can also access the 63rd Street Line, connecting both to Queens and to the Second Avenue Subway.

South of this station, between 43rd and 46th Streets, the line splits into three tunnels: a double-track tunnel for the two northbound tracks and two single tubes for each of the southbound tracks. The downtown express track rises above the other three tracks and crosses above the downtown local track approximately 320 feet (98 m) north of 43rd Street. The line returns to the traditional arrangement in both directions at 42nd Street–Bryant Park, with the local tracks outside the express tracks.

=== Exits ===
Diagram of Rockefeller Center. The subway entrance at Sixth Avenue and 48th Street is marked by a blue dot.

The station has numerous passageways and exits, including fourteen street stairs and an elevator. There are four fare control areas along the mezzanine at 47th Street, at 48th Street, between 48th and 49th Streets, and at 49th Street.

At the northern end of the station, there are passageways directly to 1251 Avenue of the Americas, 1271 Avenue of the Americas, and 30 Rockefeller Plaza. The southwest and northwest corners of Sixth Avenue and 50th Street each contain one stair. A third stair is placed within the Radio City Music Hall building on the northeast corner of that intersection. At the northwest corner of Sixth Avenue and 49th Street, within 1251 Avenue of the Americas' plaza, is a stair and an elevator. A stair within 30 Rockefeller Plaza leads to the northeast corner of that intersection. Between 48th and 49th Streets, there are two stairs within the courtyard of 1221 Avenue of the Americas on the west side of Sixth Avenue. In addition, there is a stair inside 1230 Avenue of the Americas on the east side of Sixth Avenue, as well as a passageway into that building's basement.

One staircase each leads to the northeast and southeast corners of Sixth Avenue and 48th Street. At the southwest corner of that intersection, there is a staircase within the plaza of 1211 Avenue of the Americas, as well as a passageway directly to that building. The northeast, southeast, and southwest corners of Sixth Avenue and 47th Street each contain one staircase as well. The entrance on the southwest corner of 47th Street and Sixth Avenue was not opened along with the rest of the station. A passageway leads to other buildings on the west side of Sixth Avenue south of 47th Street.
