= Seventh Avenue =

Seventh Avenue or 7 Av may refer to:

== Streets and transportation ==
- Seventh Avenue (Manhattan), a street in Manhattan, New York City, New York
- Seventh Avenue, Newark, a neighborhood in Newark, New Jersey
- Seventh Avenue (BMT Brighton Line) a New York City Subway station in Brooklyn; serving the B and Q trains
- Seventh Avenue (IND Culver Line) a New York City Subway station in Brooklyn; serving the F, <F>, and G trains
- Seventh Avenue (IND lines) a New York City Subway station in Manhattan, on the IND Sixth Avenue Line and IND Queens Boulevard Line; serving the B, D, and E trains
- Seventh Avenue (Islamabad), a road in Islamabad
- IRT Broadway–Seventh Avenue Line, a portion of the New York City Subway

== Other uses ==
- Seventh Avenue (band), a Christian heavy metal band from Germany
- Seventh Avenue, a British boyband formed by Ian Levine
- "Seventh Avenue", a song by Ratt from Dancing Undercover
- Seventh Avenue, a mail-order catalog operated by Colony Brands
- Seventh Avenue (novel), a 1966 novel by Norman Bogner
- Seventh Avenue (miniseries), a 1977 TV miniseries based on the Bogner novel
- 7th Avenue (album), an album by rapper KJ-52
- 7 Av, the seventh day of Av, the fifth month of the Hebrew calendar
