= Seventh of the month =

Recurring ordinal calendar date

The seventh of the month or seventh day of the month is the recurring calendar date position corresponding to the day numbered 7 of each month. In the Gregorian calendar (and other calendars that number days sequentially within a month), this day occurs in every month of the year, and therefore occurs twelve times per year.

- Seventh of January
- Seventh of February
- Seventh of March
- Seventh of April
- Seventh of May
- Seventh of June
- Seventh of July
- Seventh of August
- Seventh of September
- Seventh of October
- Seventh of November
- Seventh of December

In addition to these dates, this date occurs in months of many other calendars, such as the Bengali calendar and the Hebrew calendar.

== See also ==
- Seventh (disambiguation)
