= Seventh Avenue station (IND lines) =

New York City Subway station in Manhattan

7 Avenue
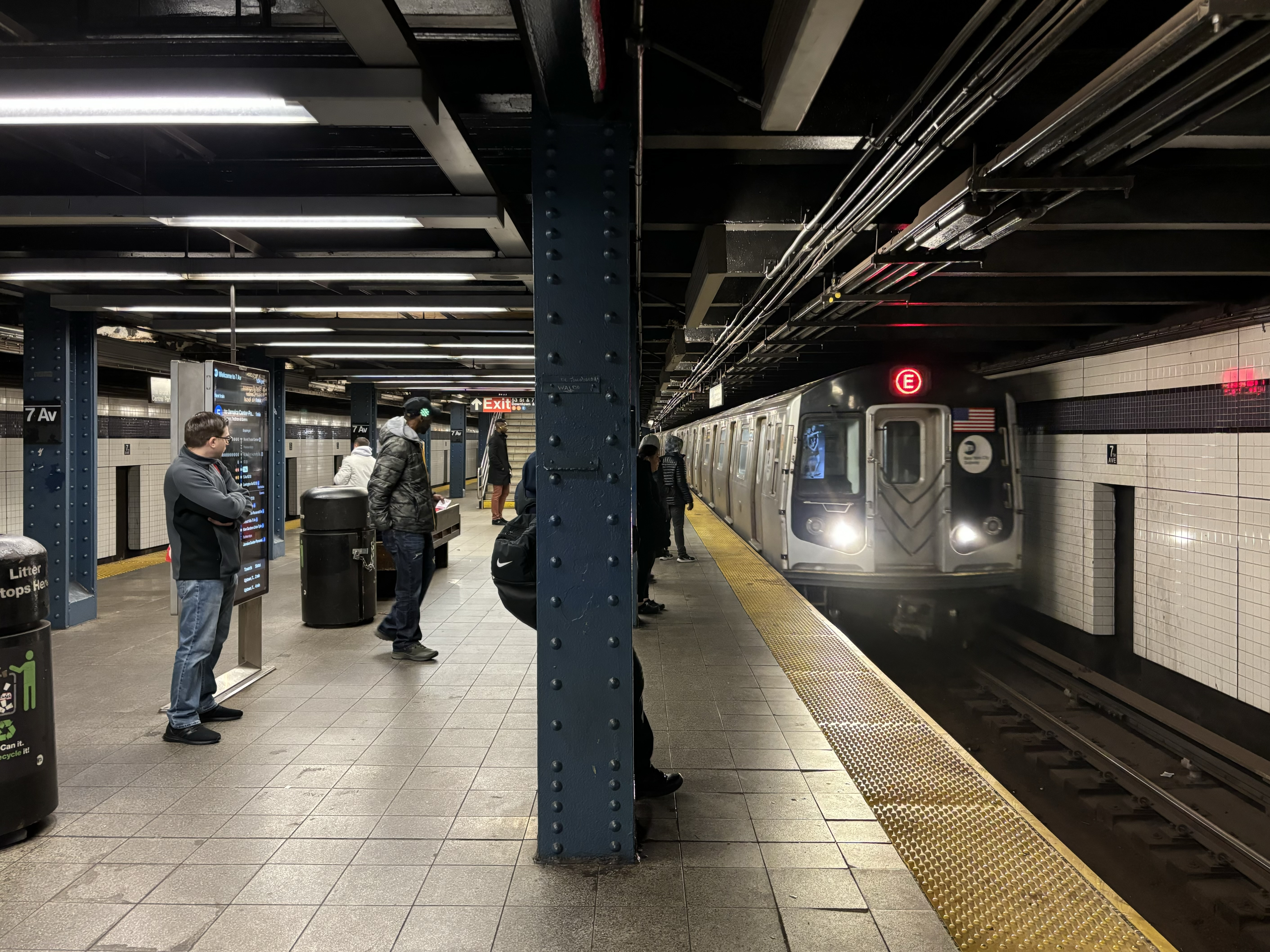
- R160 E train arriving on the lower level

Station statistics
- Address: Seventh Avenue & West 53rd Street; New York, New York
- Borough: Manhattan
- Locale: Midtown Manhattan
- Coordinates: 40.762959°N 73.981891°W
- Division: B (IND)
- Line: IND Sixth Avenue Line; IND Queens Boulevard Line
- Services: B (Weekday rush hours, middays and early evenings); D (all times); E (all times)
- Transit: NYCT Bus: M7, M20, M104
- Structure: Underground
- Levels: 2
- Platforms: 2 island platforms (1 on each level) cross-platform interchange
- Tracks: 4 (2 on each level)

Other information
- Opened: August 19, 1933; 93 years ago
- Accessible: No; planned
- Accessibility: Cross-platform transfer available
- Former/other names: Seventh Avenue–53rd Street

Traffic
- 2025: 4,486,760 ▲5%
- Rank: 70 out of 423
Services
Preceding station	New York City Subway	Following station
59th Street–Columbus Circle B D services split	Express	47th–50th Streets–Rockefeller Center B D via Grand Street
50th Street E toward World Trade Center	E (New York City Subway service)	Fifth Avenue/53rd Street E toward Jamaica Center–York College
Location
Location within New York City Subway
Location within New York City
Location within New York
Track layout
Street map
Station service legend
Symbol	Description
Stops all times	Stops all times
Stops weekdays during the day	Stops weekdays during the day

The Seventh Avenue station (announced as Seventh Avenue–53rd Street on NTT trains) is an interchange station on the IND Sixth Avenue Line and the IND Queens Boulevard Line of the New York City Subway. Located at the intersection of Seventh Avenue and 53rd Street in Manhattan, it is served by the D and E trains at all times, and the B train on weekdays.

The Seventh Avenue station was constructed by the Independent Subway System (IND), and it opened on August 19, 1933. The station has two tracks and one island platform on each of two levels.

The station is announced as Seventh Avenue–53rd Street, in the style of other stations that orient east-west along 53rd Street (such as Fifth Avenue/53rd Street and Lexington Avenue–53rd Street), as well as to prevent confusion with Seventh Avenue along the BMT Brighton Line in Brooklyn, which is also served by the B.

== History ==
=== Planning and opening ===
The Queens Boulevard Line was one of the first built by the city-owned Independent Subway System (IND), and was planned to stretch between the IND Eighth Avenue Line in Manhattan and 178th Street and Hillside Avenue in Jamaica, Queens, with a stop at Seventh Avenue. The line was first proposed in 1925. Bids for the 53rd Street subway tunnel were received in October 1926, and work started in April 1927. The 53rd Street Tunnel was fully excavated between Queens and Manhattan in January 1929.

The Seventh Avenue station was designed as an interchange point between service of the IND Queens Boulevard Line and the IND Sixth Avenue Line. The northern half of the station opened on August 19, 1933 with the opening of the IND Queens Boulevard Line to Roosevelt Avenue in Queens. The southern half of the station opened on December 15, 1940 with the opening of the IND Sixth Avenue Line north of West Fourth Street to 59th Street–Columbus Circle.

=== 20th century to present ===
In 1990, Utah tourist Brian Watkins was killed at the Seventh Avenue station while trying to protect his family from a robbery. The murder was described as "probably the tipping point in New York's history of violence and mayhem", marking a low point in the record murder year of 1990 and leading to an increased police presence in New York. Eight people were indicted: the first trial found four of the eight defendants guilty of murder, and a second trial found three of the remaining four defendants to also be guilty. One defendant was later cleared of murder charges.

In 2019, the Metropolitan Transportation Authority announced that the station would become ADA-accessible as part of the agency's 2020–2024 Capital Program. The announcement occurred after a Connecticut woman fell down a staircase trying to carry her 1-year-old daughter on a stroller down a flight of stairs; the baby survived the fall, but the mother died. The accessibility project was to be funded by congestion pricing in New York City, but it was postponed in June 2024 after the implementation of congestion pricing was delayed. However, after congestion pricing was approved, the MTA announced that the elevator installations would proceed.

== Station layout ==
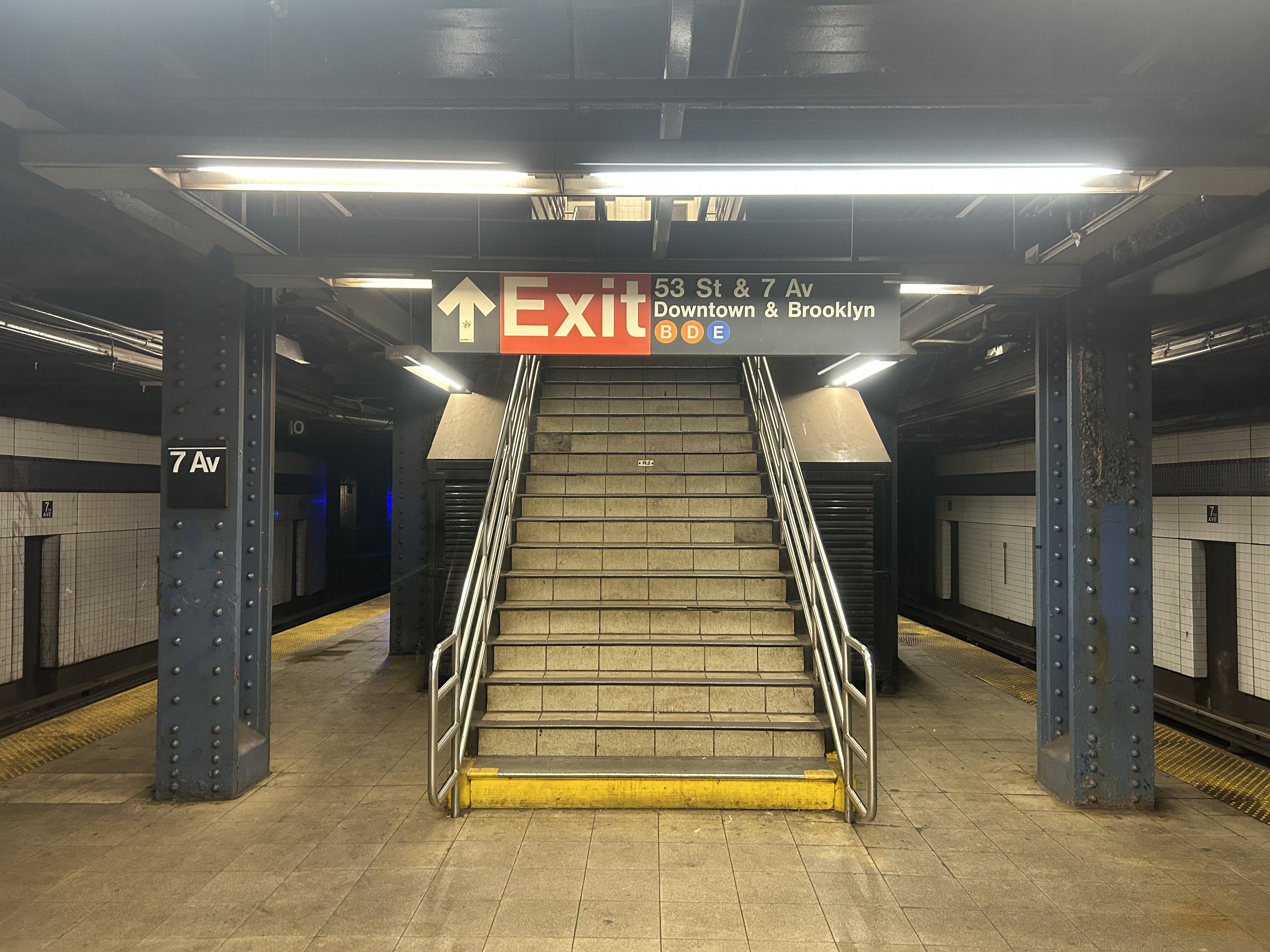
Staircases leading to the exits on 53rd Street and Seventh Avenue

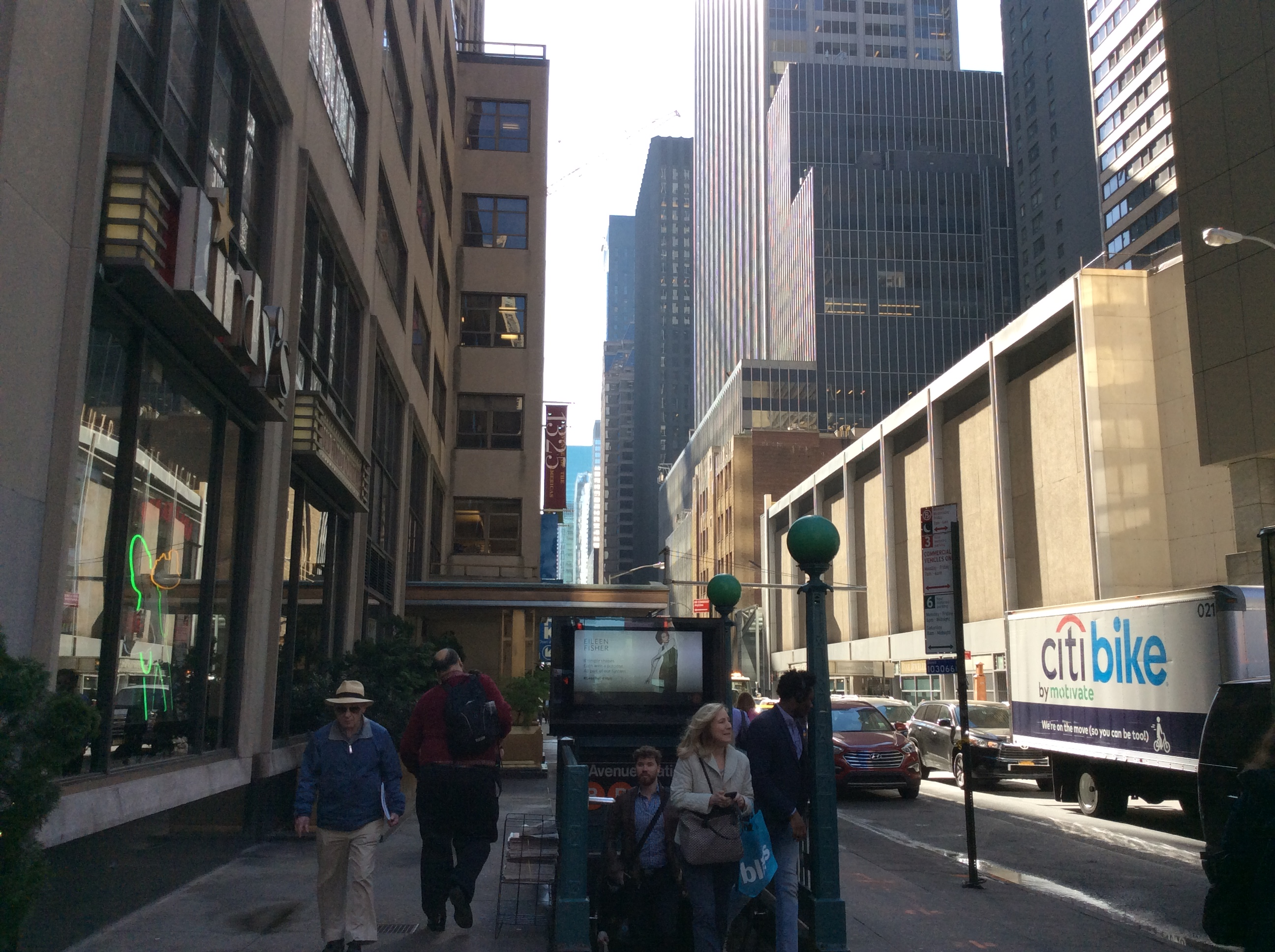
Northeast corner entrance

This is a two-level station, with two tracks on each level and two island platforms, one over the other. The lower level serves trains headed railroad north (to Central Park West for trains from the IND Sixth Avenue Line, to Queens for trains from the IND Eighth Avenue Line). The upper level is the reverse, serving trains headed railroad south (toward Lower Manhattan). Each level allows cross-platform interchange between the two lines. Trains run on the starboard side on the upper level and on the port side on the lower level. The BMT Broadway Line passes overhead near the west end of the station; this crossing is visible in the ceiling and supporting columns.

The D and E trains serve the station at all times, while the B train serves the station on weekdays during the day. The B and D trains use the Sixth Avenue Line tracks, and the E train uses the Queens Boulevard Line tracks. The next stops for E trains are 50th Street to the south and Fifth Avenue/53rd Street to the north, while the next stops for B and D trains are 59th Street–Columbus Circle to the north and 47th–50th Streets–Rockefeller Center to the south.

The station serves two distinct subway lines that do not interconnect at the station. On the Sixth Avenue Line, uptown trains (heading west through the station) merge with the IND Eighth Avenue Line along Central Park West, while downtown trains (heading east through the station) run along the Sixth Avenue Line. On the Queens Boulevard Line, uptown trains (heading east through the station) go to Queens via the 53rd Street Tunnel, while downtown trains (headed west through the station) merge with the Eighth Avenue Line south of 50th Street. There is no way for trains to travel between Central Park West and Queens, or between the Sixth Avenue Line and the lower section of the Eighth Avenue Line. West of the station, the southbound Sixth Avenue Line track (internally labeled as track B3) rises above both Queens Boulevard Line tracks (D3 southbound and D4 northbound), which in turn are above the northbound Sixth Avenue Line track (B4).

=== Exits ===
This station has two main exits: one at the western end of the station at Broadway, and one in the middle of the station at Seventh Avenue. The western exit has staircases leading to the northeast and southeast corners of 53rd Street and Broadway. The middle exit has staircases leading to the northeast and southeast corners of 53rd Street and Seventh Avenue. There is a never-opened exit to the IND Central Substation at the station's eastern end, halfway between Seventh and Sixth Avenues (at 6½ Avenue).
