= 7th Sea =

7th Sea may refer to:

- 7th Sea (role-playing game), a 1999 swashbuckler game
- 7th Sea (collectible card game), a 1999 game based on the RPG

== See also ==
- Seven Seas
