= 7th Street station =

7th Street station may refer to:

- 7th Street station (Charlotte), a LYNX Blue Line station in Charlotte
- 7th Street/Metro Center station, a Metro Rail station in Los Angeles
