= Seventh day =

The seventh day may refer to:

- Saturday in some calendars
- Sunday in other calendars
- Friday in the Bahá'í calendar
- Shabbat in Judaism
- Sabbath in seventh-day churches
- Qixi Festival, a Chinese festival that falls on the seventh day of the 7th month on the Chinese calendar

== Film and TV ==
- The 7th Day, a 2004 Spanish film
- 7th Day (film), a 2014 Indian Malayalam-language film
- The Seventh Day (1922 film), a 1922 American silent film
- The Seventh Day (2021 film), a 2021 American film
- The Seventh Day (TV series), a 2008 Hong Kong television series

== Others ==
- The Seventh Day (album), a 2008 Chinese album by Thin Man
- The Seventh Day (novel), a 2013 Chinese novel by Yu Hua

== See also ==
- Biblical Sabbath
- Sabbath in Christianity
- Seventh-day Adventist Church
