= 42nd Street–Bryant Park/Fifth Avenue station =

New York City Subway station in Manhattan

42 Street–Bryant Park/ 5 Avenue
- New York City Subway station complex
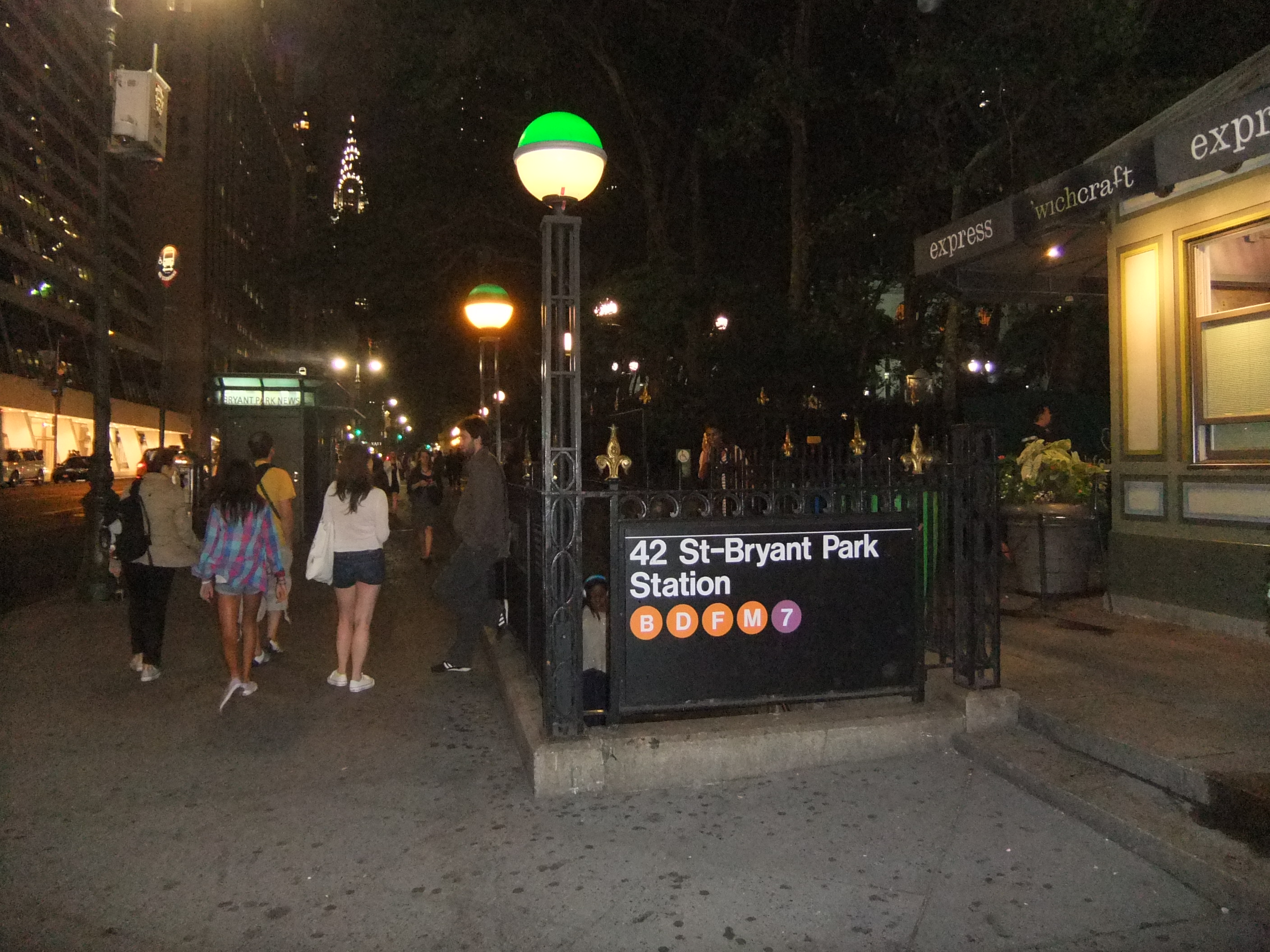
- An entrance to the IND station

Station statistics
- Address: West 42nd Street between Fifth Avenue & Sixth Avenue; New York, New York
- Borough: Manhattan
- Locale: Midtown Manhattan
- Coordinates: 40.7548°N 73.9842°W
- Division: A (IRT), B (IND)
- Line: IND Sixth Avenue Line; IRT Flushing Line
- Services: 7 (all times) <7> (rush hours until 9:30 p.m., peak direction); B (weekdays during the day); D (all times); F (all times) <F> (two rush hour trains, peak direction); M (weekdays during the day)
- System transfers: At Times Square–42nd Street/Port Authority Bus Terminal, daytime (6 a.m. to 12 a.m.) only: 1 (all times); 2 (all times); 3 (all times); 7 (all times) <7> (rush hours until 9:30 p.m., peak direction); A (all times); C (all except late nights); E (all times); N (all times); Q (all times); R (all except late nights); W (weekdays only); S (all except late nights)
- Transit: NYCT Bus: M1, M2, M3, M4, M5, M7, M42, M55, SIM1C, SIM3, SIM3C, SIM6, SIM8, SIM10, SIM22, SIM23, SIM24, SIM25, SIM26, SIM30, SIM31; MTA Bus: Q32, BxM2, QM1, QM2, QM4, QM5, QM6, QM20
- Structure: Underground
- Levels: 2

Other information
- Accessible: Partially; access to mezzanine only, access to platforms under construction

Traffic
- 2025: 61,203,303 (Note: Ridership data includes Times Square–42nd Street station, 42nd Street–Port Authority Bus Terminal station, and 42nd Street–Bryant Park/Fifth Avenue station) ▲6.4%
- Rank: 1 out of 423
Location
Location within New York City Subway
Location within New York City
Location within New York
Street map
Station service legend
Symbol	Description
Stops all times	Stops all times
Stops all times except late nights	Stops all times except late nights
Stops rush hours in the peak direction only	Stops rush hours in the peak direction only
Stops weekdays during the day	Stops weekdays during the day

The 42nd Street–Bryant Park/Fifth Avenue station is an underground New York City Subway station complex, consisting of stations on the IRT Flushing Line and IND Sixth Avenue Line. Located at 42nd Street between Fifth Avenue and Sixth Avenue (Avenue of the Americas) in Manhattan, it is served by the 7, D and F trains at all times, the B and M trains on weekdays, and the <7> train and <F> trains during rush hours in the peak direction. A free passageway from the IND platforms to the Times Square–42nd Street station, served by the 1, 2, 3, 7, <7>, N, Q, R, W, and S trains is open during the day from 6 a.m. to 12 a.m., which also allows for transfers to/from the A, C, and E trains at 42nd Street-Port Authority Bus Terminal.

The Interborough Rapid Transit Company (IRT) built the Flushing Line platform, which opened in 1926 as the first part of an extension of the Queensboro Subway (today's Flushing Line) from Grand Central to Times Square. The Sixth Avenue Line platforms opened in 1940, completing construction of the first phase of the Independent Subway System (IND). Free out-of-system walking transfers between the stations on the two lines began being provided on weekdays in 1967, and an underground passageway was completed in 1971, allowing free in-system transfers. In 1998, the entire station complex was renovated. A free transfer to the Times Square station was opened in 2021 with the completion of a renovation project on the 42nd Street Shuttle. There are plans to add elevators to the station to make it compliant with the Americans with Disabilities Act of 1990.

The IRT station has one island platform and two tracks and runs from west to east. The IND station has two island platforms and four tracks; it runs from north to south and is west of the IRT station. There is a mezzanine above the IRT platform, connected by a corridor to a mezzanine above much of the IND platform. A separate mezzanine exists above the extreme north end of the IND station. The 42nd Street–Bryant Park/Fifth Avenue complex served 17,213,702 passengers in 2019, making it the 13th busiest station in the subway system.

== History ==
Planning for a subway line in New York City dates to 1864. However, development of what would become the city's first subway line did not start until 1894, when the New York State Legislature authorized the Rapid Transit Act. The Rapid Transit Construction Company, organized by John B. McDonald and funded by August Belmont Jr., signed the initial Contract 1 with the Rapid Transit Commission in February 1900, in which it would construct the subway and maintain a 50-year operating lease from the opening of the line. Belmont incorporated the Interborough Rapid Transit Company (IRT) in April 1902 to operate the subway. As part of the project, a section of tunnel under 42nd Street was constructed between the intersections of Park Avenue/41st Street and Broadway/47th Street. Degnon-McLean was awarded the contract to build this section of the line, and construction began on February 25, 1901.

The first section of the line opened on October 27, 1904. The line did not serve Bryant Park directly; the nearest stations were Times Square, a local stop, and Grand Central, an express stop. Additional lines opened in 1918, thereby dividing the original line into an H-shaped system. The old route under 42nd Street became the 42nd Street Shuttle, which ran between Times Square and Grand Central without any intermediate stops.

=== IRT Flushing Line ===
The Dual Contracts were formalized in March 1913, specifying new lines or expansions to be built by the IRT and the Brooklyn Rapid Transit Company (BRT). The Dual Contracts involved opening the Steinway Tunnel as part of the new Flushing subway line. The route, traveling under 41st and 42nd Streets in Manhattan, was to go from Times Square through the tunnel over to Long Island City and from there continue toward Flushing. The section of the tunnel between Grand Central–42nd Street and Queens had opened on June 22, 1915.

==== Construction ====
In July 1920, the New York State Public Service Commission announced it would extend the Flushing Line two stops west to Times Square, with an intermediate station under Bryant Park. The western end of the Bryant Park station would be 300 feet (91 m) east of Sixth Avenue, while the eastern end would be about 100 feet (30 m) west of Fifth Avenue. The 42nd Street Association, a local civic group, regarded the station as very important. In May 1921, it was expected that contracts for the extension would be advertised shortly.

On November 9, 1921, the New York State Transit Commission opened up the contract for the extension for bidding. The extension would take a slightly different route than the one specified in the Dual Contracts. The original proposal had the line constructed under 42nd Street to a point just to the east of Broadway, which would have forced riders transferring to the IRT Broadway–Seventh Avenue Line to walk a long distance. On November 22, 1921, the Powers-Kennedy Contracting Corporation was awarded a contract to construct the extension on a low bid of $3,867,138, below the estimated cost of over $4 million. This low bid was the narrowest margin ever recorded for any large city contract, beating out the next highest bidder by 0.7 percent. While the contractor was provided four years to complete work, engineers expected to reduce the time needed to do so to as little as three years. Since work on the project had to be completed underneath the foundations of several large buildings, such as theatres, and the north end of the New York Public Library, the contractor had to provide a $1 million bond. The project was expected to reduce crowding on the 42nd Street Shuttle by enabling riders to use the Queensboro Subway to directly access Times Square. 24,000 of the estimated 100,000 daily shuttle riders transferred to and from the Queensboro Subway. The line was to extend as far as Eighth Avenue to connect with the proposed IND Eighth Avenue Line.

Powers-Kennedy started excavating the line westward from Grand Central in May 1922. The Flushing Line extension was to run beneath the original line from Vanderbilt to Fifth Avenue, running as little as 4 inches (100 mm) under the original line. The tunnel also had to pass under a sewage line at Madison Avenue. The construction of the Fifth Avenue station required underpinning the New York Public Library Main Branch and extending the library's foundation downward. The subway tunnel ran 35 feet (11 m) below ground level. During construction, workers took precautions to avoid interrupting the flow of traffic above ground and interfering with preexisting tunnels. The contractors had completed the tunnels to Fifth Avenue by May 1923. Local civic groups advocated for the Fifth Avenue station to be used as a temporary terminal while the permanent terminus at Times Square was being completed. By the end of 1923, the Transit Commission had allocated $50,000 for the construction of a temporary crossover east of the Fifth Avenue station.

The temporary terminal at Fifth Avenue was nearly complete by February 1926. The station had two entrances on the south side of 42nd Street (one next to the library and the other next to the park). A third entrance was placed within the Stern's building on the north side. Stern's funded the construction of the entrance inside its building, which also included storefront windows. The entrance through the Stern's building did not open along with the rest of the station, and opened at a later point. These entrances connected with a mezzanine above the platform. The platform was to be 480 feet (150 m) long, though only a 300-foot (91 m) section would be used initially as a double crossover to the east of the station still needed to be used while it was a terminal. With the completion of the line to Eighth Avenue, the switch would be removed, and the platform could be extended.

==== Opening and unification ====
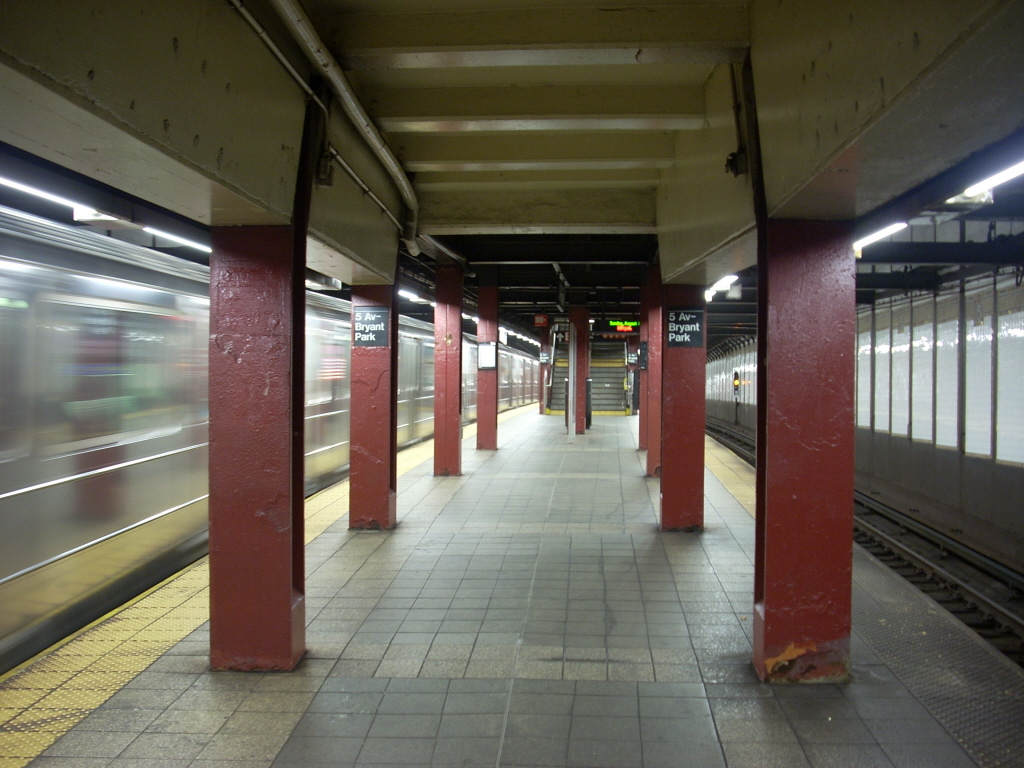
The Fifth Avenue station on the Flushing Line was the first part of the complex to open.

The Fifth Avenue station opened on March 22, 1926, extending the IRT Flushing Line one stop to the west from the line's previous terminus at Grand Central. Even so, many Flushing Line passengers traveling from Queens to the West Side of Manhattan tended to transfer to the shuttle at Grand Central, rather than leave the train at Fifth Avenue. The Flushing Line was extended to Times Square on March 14, 1927, following various delays. The northern section of Bryant Park, which had been closed for four years during the line's construction, was restored shortly afterward. By 1930, a fourth entrance to the Fifth Avenue station was being constructed from the basement of the Salmon Tower Building.

The city government took over the IRT's operations on June 12, 1940. The New York City Board of Transportation (BOT) announced in January 1950 that it would lengthen the platforms at the Times Square and Fifth Avenue stations from 480 to 554 feet (146 to 169 m). The platforms at Fifth Avenue and all other stations on the Flushing Line with the exception of Queensboro Plaza were extended in 1955–1956 to accommodate 11-car trains.

=== IND Sixth Avenue Line ===
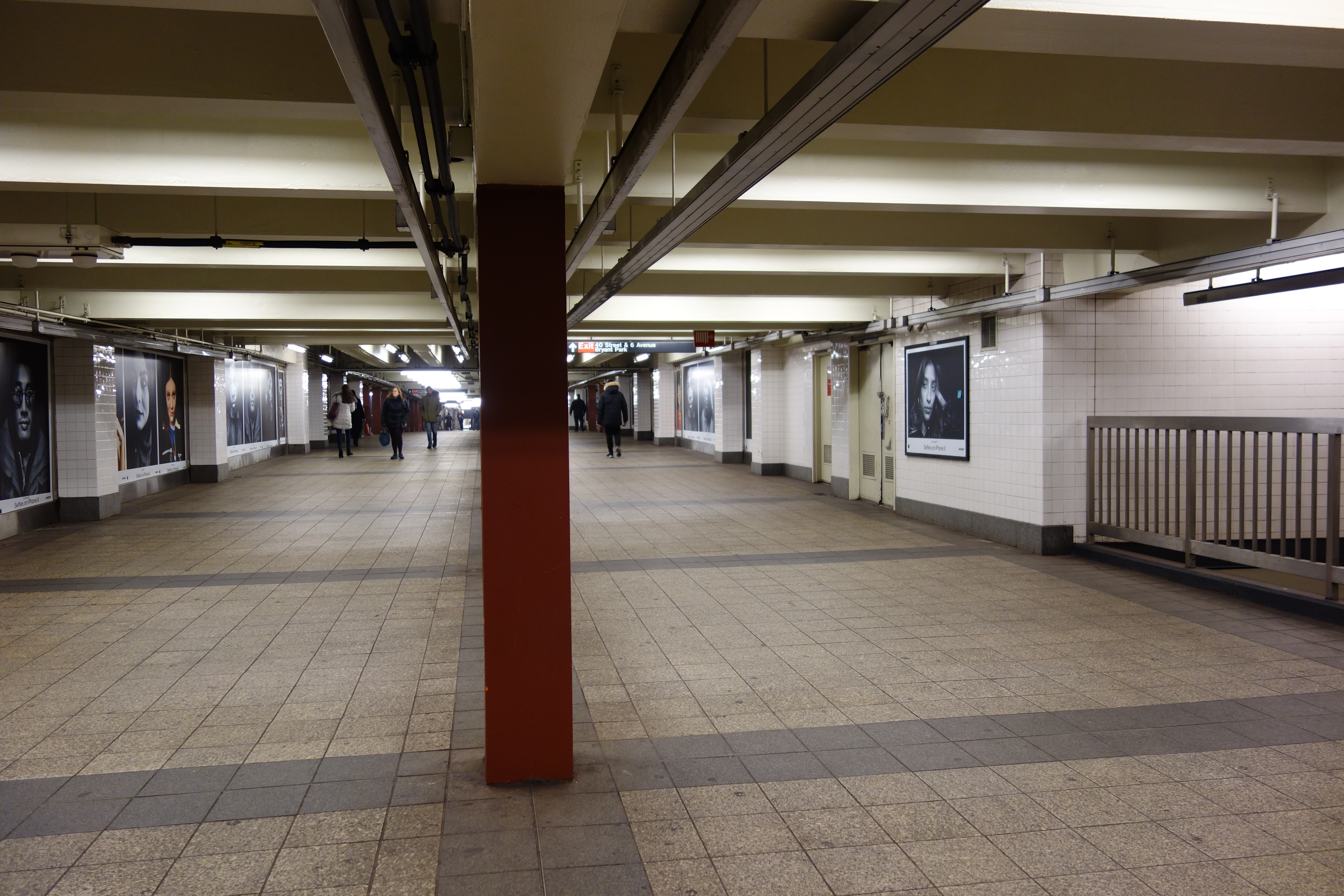
View of the mezzanine above the IND station

New York City mayor John Francis Hylan's original plans for the Independent Subway System (IND), proposed in 1922, included building over 100 miles (160 km) of new lines and taking over nearly 100 miles (160 km) of existing lines. The lines were designed to compete with the existing underground, surface, and elevated lines operated by the Interborough Rapid Transit Company (IRT) and Brooklyn–Manhattan Transit Corporation (BMT). The IND Sixth Avenue Line was designed to replace the elevated IRT Sixth Avenue Line. In 1924, the IND submitted its list of proposed subway routes to the BOT, which approved the program. One of the routes was a segment of tunnel from Fourth Street to 53rd Street. Part of this stretch was already occupied by the Hudson & Manhattan Railroad (H&M)'s Uptown Hudson Tubes. As a result, negotiations between the city and the H&M continued for several years. The IND and H&M finally came to an agreement in 1930. The city had decided to build the IND Sixth Avenue Line's local tracks around the pre-existing H&M tubes, and add express tracks for the IND underneath the H&M tubes at a later date. Also in 1930, the BOT identified the locations of 104 stations to be built in the IND system. Under this plan, there would have been a local station at Sixth Avenue and 42nd Street.

The IND started advertising bids for the section of the Sixth Avenue Line between 43rd and 53rd Streets in April 1931. Engineers started planning in earnest for the Midtown portion of the Sixth Avenue Line in April 1935. The city government issued corporate stock to pay for the $53 million cost of the project, since the line was not eligible for federal Public Works Administration funds. The first contract, for the section between 40th and 47th Streets, was awarded to Rosoff-Brader Construction in October 1935. The next February, mayor Fiorello H. La Guardia announced that construction would start within six weeks. The contractors were to excavate a construction shaft at Bryant Park (completing the shaft by April 1), upon which they would proceed northward. La Guardia broke ground for the Sixth Avenue subway at Bryant Park on March 23, 1936.

The line was built as a four-track tunnel north of 33rd Street (including the Rockefeller Center station), but there were only two tracks south of that street. The work largely involved cut-and-cover excavations, although portions of the subway had to be tunneled through solid rock. The builders also had to avoid disrupting the Sixth Avenue elevated or the various utility lines on the avenue, and some of the pipes and wires had to be replaced in the process. Excavation work was conducted 24 hours a day, with most of the blasting work being conducted at night. Workers used small charges of dynamite to avoid damaging nearby buildings or the Catskill Aqueduct, which ran below Sixth Avenue and was a major part of the New York City water supply system. The contractors built a compressor plant and a shaft at 46th Street, and they excavated another shaft at Bryant Park.

Work on excavating the 42nd Street station was further complicated by the fact that it had to be built above the Flushing Line tunnel at 41st Street, but below the 42nd Street Shuttle tunnel one block north. The site of the 42nd Street station had been excavated by mid-1937. Contractors constructed subway entrances at 40th and 42nd Street, and portions of the parapet wall surrounding Bryant Park were temporarily removed in the process. The section north of 33rd Street had mostly been excavated by November 1937, including "rough construction work" for the 42nd Street station. The IRT's Sixth Avenue elevated closed in December 1938, just before the Sixth Avenue subway was completed. In advance of the 1939 New York World's Fair, La Guardia proposed installing a visitors' gallery in the 42nd Street station, detailing the Sixth Avenue Line's construction. The 42nd Street–Bryant Park station opened on December 15, 1940, as part of the opening of the IND Sixth Avenue Line from 47th–50th Streets–Rockefeller Center to West Fourth Street. The opening of the Sixth Avenue Line relieved train traffic on the Eighth Avenue Line, which was used by all IND services except for the G Brooklyn–Queens Crosstown service.

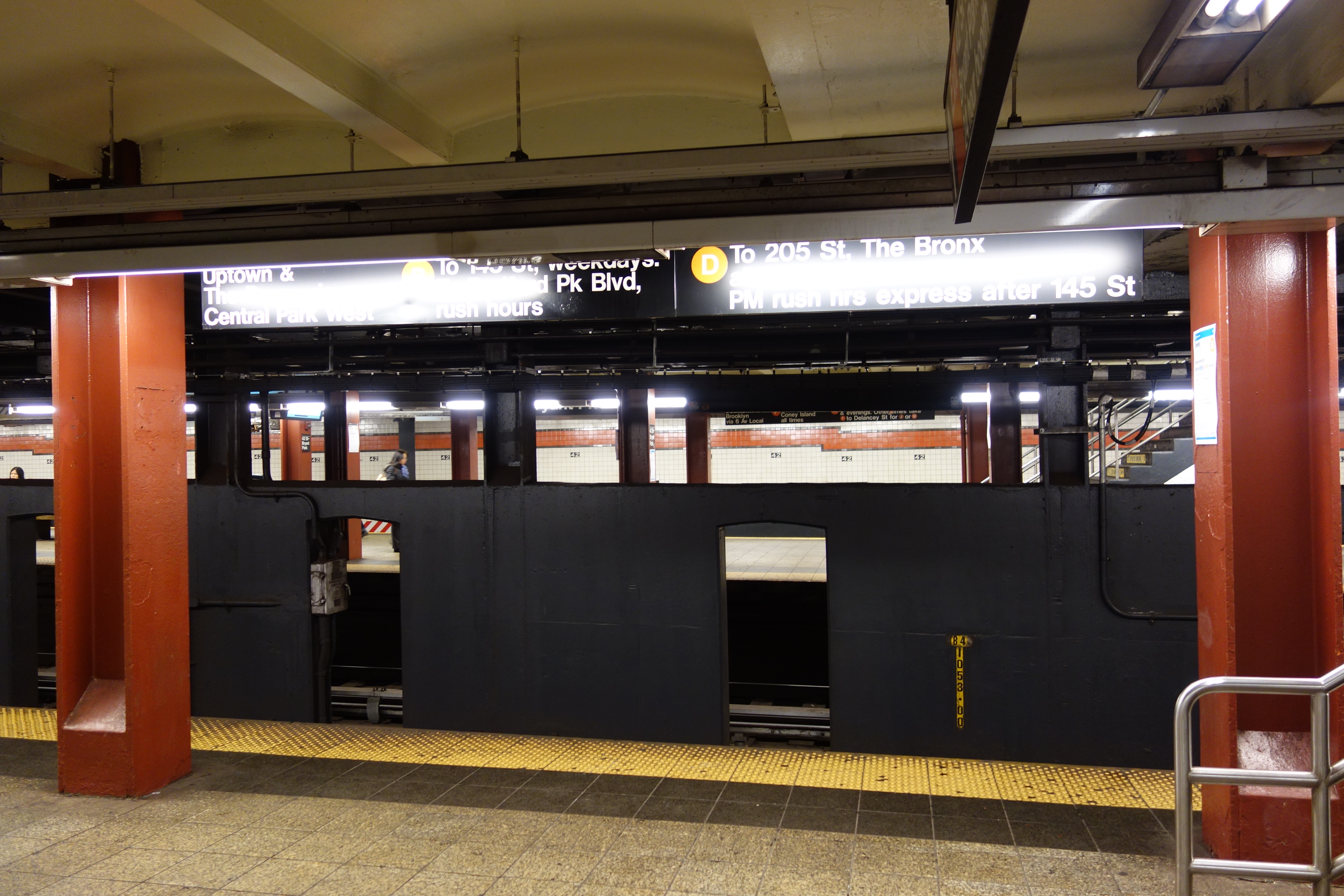
View of the IND platforms

The administration of mayor William O'Dwyer studied the possibility of converting the IND mezzanine and the adjacent passageway to Herald Square into a parking garage in mid-1946. The city government examined three separate plans for a parking lot with 100 to 500 spaces. BOT chairman Charles P. Gross dismissed the idea as prohibitively expensive. In a 1951 report concerning the construction of bomb shelters in the subway system in the midst of the Cold War, the BOT proposed constructing a ramp between 40th Street and the 42nd Street–Bryant Park station. In 1956, a marketplace for used books was proposed for the passageway leading to the 34th Street–Herald Square station. By then, a gate at 40th Street blocked off access to the passageway from the 42nd Street–Bryant Park station. The book mart would have housed the Fourth Avenue Booksellers Association, whose members declined an offer to relocate there.

=== Station complex and later modifications ===
==== 1940s to 1980s ====
There initially was no direct connection between the IND's 42nd Street–Bryant Park station and the IRT's Fifth Avenue station, despite the fact that three other stations on the new line contained transfers to other services. Though the BOT created free transfers at many points across the New York City Subway system in 1948, a free transfer was not added between the 42nd Street–Bryant Park and Fifth Avenue stations at the time because of heavy congestion in the "Times Square and 34th Street areas". Starting on December 18, 1967, the New York City Transit Authority (NYCTA) provided paper tickets to passengers, allowing them to transfer between the IND and IRT stations for free during weekdays in the peak direction. Transfers to the IRT were distributed from 5 a.m. to noon, and transfers to the IND were distributed from noon to 8 p.m.. Passengers had to exit one station and use the sidewalk to enter the other. The paper tickets were a temporary measure until the NYCTA completed a passageway within fare control.

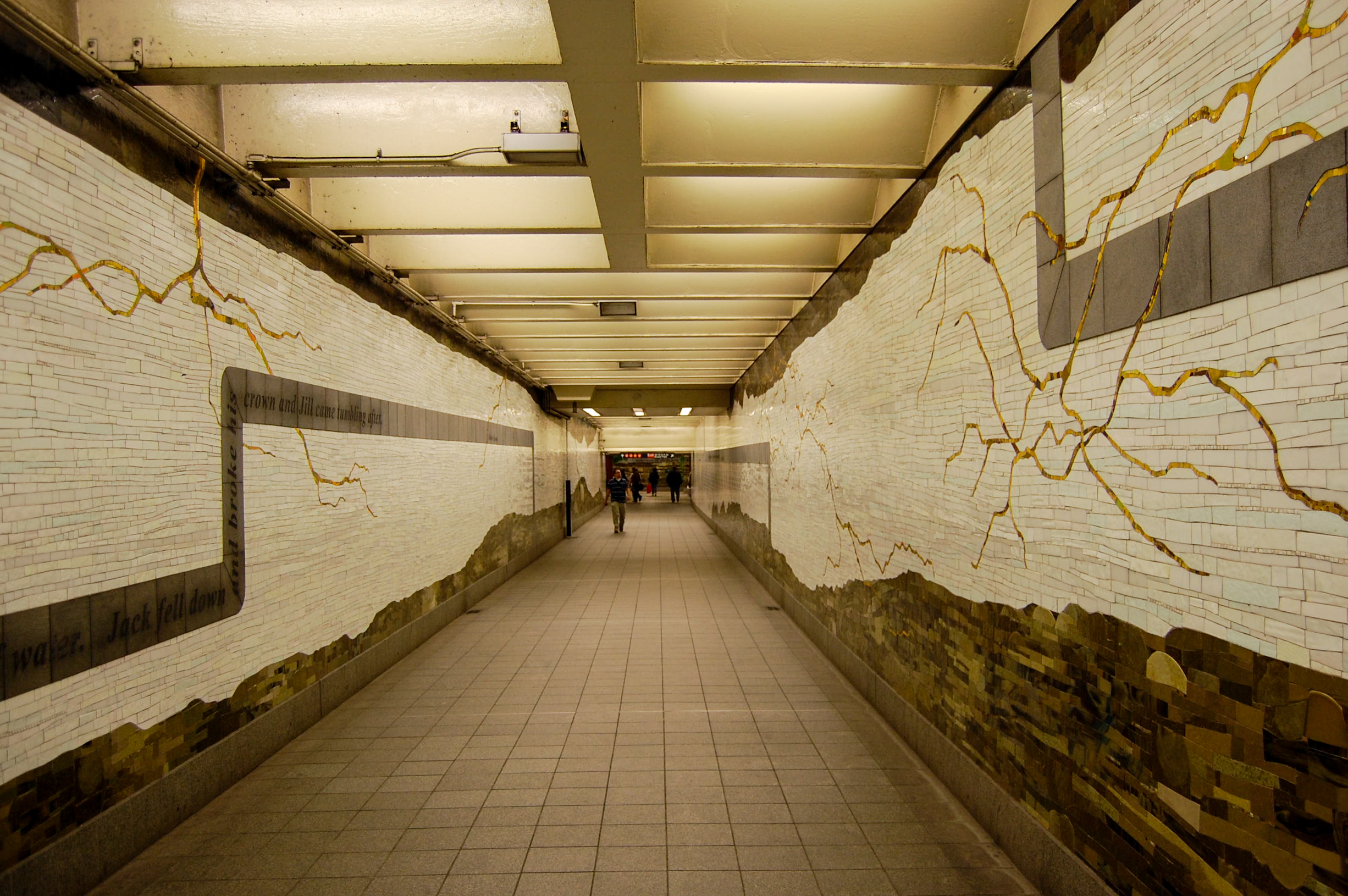
Passageway between IRT Flushing Line and IND Sixth Avenue Line, opened in 1971

The NYCTA started constructing a 300-foot-long (91 m) passageway between the two stations in 1969. Workers dug a trench measuring 20 feet (6.1 m) wide and 35 feet (11 m) deep, then covered the trench with a 14-foot-deep (4.3 m) layer of fill. The project involved removing 14 plane trees from Bryant Park, which prompted protests from preservationists. The developer of the nearby 1095 Avenue of the Americas office building contributed $500,000 to the station's renovation in exchange for permission to build additional office space. About half of the tunnel was decorated with terrazzo floors; orange brick and tile walls; glass and steel railings; and recessed lighting. The NYCTA completed the tunnel in 1971, upon which it was used by an average of 6,500 passengers during weekdays. The tunnel was decorated with eight porcelain murals, each measuring 10 feet (3.0 m) wide. The murals depicted historical and present-day structures at Bryant Park, including the Latting Observatory and New York Crystal Palace.

In the late 1970s, the Flushing Line platform was painted beige as part of Operation Facelift, a system-wide refurbishment program led by Phyllis Cerf Wagner. The IND station had become rundown by the mid-1980s. During this period, the IND mezzanine hosted various art exhibitions, including a showcase of schoolchildren's art and portraits of subway riders from around the world. The 42nd Street/Fifth Avenue station also recorded more felonies than almost any other New York City Subway station during the 1980s. According to a 1986 study, passengers were more likely to be robbed at the 42nd Street/Fifth Avenue station than at any other place in the system.

==== 1990s to 2010s ====
The Metropolitan Transportation Authority (MTA) announced in 1990 that it would spend $730 million to renovate 74 subway stations, including the 42nd Street station. The passageway to the Herald Square station was closed the following year due to high crime. In 1994, amid a funding shortfall, the administration of mayor Rudy Giuliani proposed delaying the station's renovation. That October, the MTA announced it had "indefinitely" postponed plans for renovating the 42nd Street station. The MTA again proposed renovating the station as part of its 1995–1999 capital plan. Work was underway by mid-1999, but the project had fallen six months behind schedule, with a planned completion date of October 2002. The IND station, which was formerly known simply as 42nd Street, was renamed 42nd Street–Bryant Park around 2003.

In 2011, as part of a renovation of 1095 Avenue of the Americas, the building's owner Blackstone Group relocated the building's subway entrance eastward by several dozen feet. As part of the development of 7 Bryant Park in 2012 and 2013, the station entrance at the southwestern corner of 40th Street and Sixth Avenue was removed, and a new in-building accessible entrance was constructed at the northwestern corner of 39th Street and Sixth Avenue, completed by 2016. The construction of the development had required a relocation of the street staircase at 40th Street to within the building per zoning requirements, but the developer, working with the MTA's Transit-Oriented Development, determined that the building and subway riders would benefit more from having the entrance at 39th Street. Removing the 40th Street entrance enabled the building to have its main entrance face Bryant Park. The easement agreement between the MTA and the property developer was filed on May 14, 2012.

==== 2020s to present ====
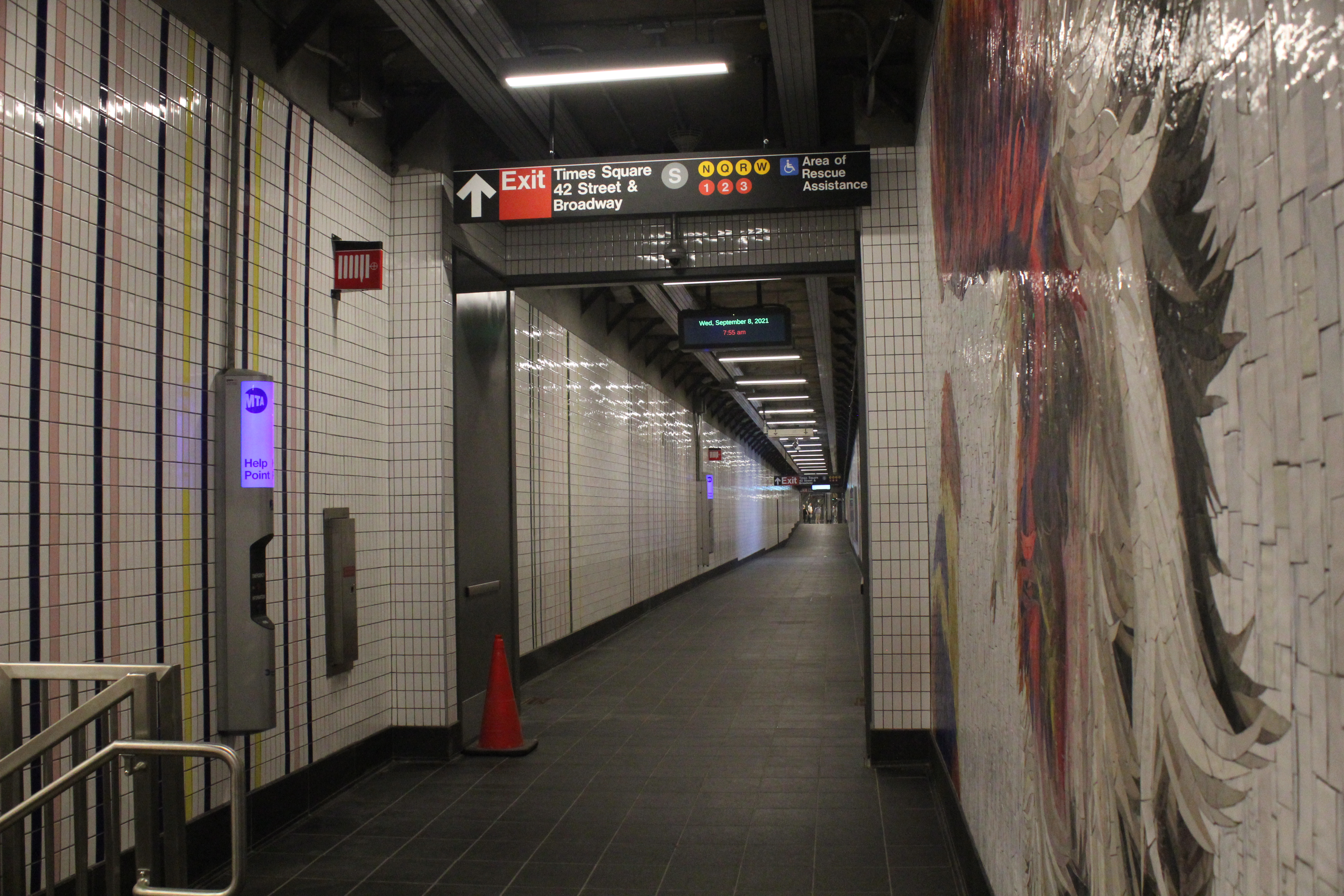
Passageway between IND Sixth Avenue Line and 42nd Street Shuttle, opened in 2021

A transfer to the 42nd Street Shuttle at Times Square was built as part of the 2015–2019 MTA Capital Program. A new platform for the shuttle, which would be 28 feet (8.5 m) wide and located between Tracks 1 and 4 (the outer tracks of the shuttle tunnel), replaced the existing curved platforms for tracks 1, 3, and 4. The platform was built along the section of the shuttle that runs under 42nd Street, which is located within a straight tunnel. The whole project was estimated to cost $235.41 million. The Times Square shuttle platform was extended 360 feet (110 m) east, and since an emergency point of egress had to be provided, it was also used to allow for a second point of entry at Sixth Avenue, with a connection to the IND Sixth Avenue Line platforms via a secondary mezzanine at the northern end of the platforms. A construction contract was awarded in early 2019, with an estimated completion date of March 2022. The free transfer opened on September 7, 2021, along with the new shuttle platform.

In January 2020, the MTA announced plans to make the station complex accessible as part of the 42nd Street Connection Project. New elevators would be installed between platform level and the mezzanine of the Sixth Avenue Line station (one from each platform), a new elevator would be installed between the platform and mezzanine of the Flushing Line station, and two new stairs would be installed in the closed passageway to the W. R. Grace Building on the north side of 42nd Street between Fifth Avenue and Sixth Avenue. The project, which was to be completed between October 2021 and October 2023, would be bundled with developer and escalator improvement projects at Grand Central, and would be completed as part of a Design-Build procurement. When the transfer passageway to the 42nd Street Shuttle opened, elevators were planned to be installed between the passageway and at least one of the platforms at a later date.The 39th Street easement entrance, along with eight other easement entrances in Manhattan, were closed early in 2020 at the request of building owners due to the COVID-19 pandemic. The 39th Street entrance was the only entrance that remained closed in March 2022. In a response to a story by The City, an MTA spokesman said the entrance had been closed as the corridor at the bottom of the stairs had attracted illegal activities, and MTA Chairman Janno Lieber said that the agency did not have control over the developer.

In March 2024, the MTA installed low platform fences on the Flushing Line platform to reduce the likelihood of passengers falling onto the tracks. The barriers, spaced along the length of the platform, do not have sliding platform screen doors between them. The station's ADA accessibility project was to be funded by congestion pricing in New York City, but it was postponed in June 2024 after the implementation of congestion pricing was delayed.

On January 31, 2025, the MTA put out an RFP for a design-build project to make the station complex ADA-accessible. Four elevators would be installed as part of the project. One elevator would lead from the Flushing Line platform to the mezzanine, one would lead from each Sixth Avenue Line platform to the mezzanine, and one would lead from the passageway to the 42nd Street Shuttle and the northbound Sixth Avenue Line platform. Bathrooms at the Sixth Avenue Line station would be modified to be ADA-compliant, a station-complex wide fire alarm system would be installed, ADA boarding areas would be constructed on platforms, fare control areas would be modified, and some stairs at the Sixth Avenue Line station would be relocated. State of good repair work would also be made as part of the project, including repairs to platforms, ventilator, and chamber walls. The project was estimated to cost between $50 million and $100 million, and it was planned to take 1,080 days, or about three years. That December, Paul J. Scariano Inc. received an $84 million contract to install the elevators at the 42nd Street–Bryant Park/Fifth Avenue station complex. In June 2026, the station was temporarily renamed the "Nike Bryant Park Station" for the Nike Bryant Park World Cup presentation. Work on the elevators began that October.

=== Service history ===
==== IRT station ====
When the Flushing Line station opened, it served as the western terminus of trains that traveled eastward to Queens. East of Queensboro Plaza, trains traveled to either Astoria–Ditmars Boulevard or Flushing–Main Street; the IRT shared the route east of Queensboro Plaza with the Brooklyn–Manhattan Transit Corporation (BMT) until 1949. The IRT routes were given numbered designations in 1948 with the introduction of "R-type" rolling stock, which contained rollsigns with numbered designations for each service. The Times Square to Flushing route became known as the 7. Express trains began running during the 1939 New York World's Fair. Super-express 7 trains started serving the station in 1953, running nonstop between Queensboro Plaza and Willets Point Boulevard during rush hours in the peak direction, but the super-express service was discontinued in 1956.

==== IND station ====
When the Sixth Avenue Line station opened, the BB train served the station during weekday rush hours only, running local between 168th Street and 34th Street–Herald Square. The station was served at all times by the D train, which ran from 34th Street to the Bronx, and the F train, which ran from Brooklyn to Queens. With the completion of express tracks between West Fourth and 34th Streets in 1967, as well as the portion of the Chrystie Street Connection connecting the Sixth Avenue Line with the Manhattan Bridge, the B and D trains started running express on the Sixth Avenue Line. The 57th Street station opened in 1968, upon which trains to 57th Street began serving the 42nd Street station. The portion of the Chrystie Street Connection connecting the Sixth Avenue Line with the Williamsburg Bridge opened on July 1, 1968, and was used by the KK train until that route was discontinued in 1976.

The Sixth Avenue Line station was also served by the JFK Express from 1978 to 1990 when it was discontinued. When the Manhattan Bridge's north tracks were closed for repairs between 1986 and 1988, the Sixth Avenue Shuttle stopped at the station, running from 57th Street to Grand Street. The Q train started running along the Sixth Avenue Line's express tracks in 1988 and continued to operate on the line until 2001. The V train, which used the Sixth Avenue Line's local tracks, began serving the station in December 2001. The V train was discontinued in 2010 and replaced by the M train.

== Station layout ==
Metrically accurate station map of 42nd Street–Bryant Park/Fifth Avenue, showing platforms, mezzanines, stairs, elevators, escalators, exits, ticket machines (MetroCard and OMNY), gates, benches, trashcans, and restrooms.

At 41st Street and Sixth Avenue, the IRT Flushing Line runs west–east and crosses underneath the IND Sixth Avenue Line, which runs north–south. The IRT Flushing Line station is an express stop with two tracks and one island platform, while the IND Sixth Avenue Line station is an express stop with four tracks and two island platforms.

There are three elevators to street level: one each located on the northwestern and southwestern corners of Sixth Avenue and 42nd Street, and one on the western side of Sixth Avenue between 39th and 40th Streets. The first elevator serves a small mezzanine at the northern end of the Sixth Avenue Line platforms, while the latter two elevators serve a primary mezzanine above both sets of platforms. There are no elevators from either of the mezzanines to either platform level, so the station complex is not fully ADA-accessible, although the MTA plans to make the platforms accessible at a later date.

=== Mezzanines ===
The IND station has two mezzanines above the two island platforms. The 42nd Street Shuttle, which passes perpendicularly over the Sixth Avenue Line at 42nd Street, divides the mezzanines. A staircase from each platform goes up to the northern mezzanine, which consists of a small fare control area on the north side of 42nd Street. The southern mezzanine, south of 42nd Street, connects with the IRT Flushing Line platform and extends south to 40th Street. Four stairs lead from each platform to the southern mezzanine: two at the center of the platform and two near the south end of the platform. The mezzanine has a florist, orange I-beam columns, lit-up ads, and space rentals along the walls.

The IRT mezzanine extends above most of the platform. Six stairs lead from the platform to the center of the mezzanine. The mezzanine slopes upward toward a set of fare control areas at both ends. Near the western end, a ramp slopes down to the IND station.

==== Artwork ====
The walls of the passageway between the IRT and IND stations are decorated with a mosaic by Samm Kunce, Under Bryant Park, which was installed in 2002. The artwork depicts pipes, rock outcroppings, and the roots of trees. According to Kunce, the artwork was based on the concept of systems. The artwork also contains various quotations, including those by poets Ovid and James Joyce. At the western end of the passageway (along the wall of the IND station's southern mezzanine) are depictions of dark rocks and plants, as well as a quote from philosopher Carl Jung: "Nature must not win the game, but she cannot lose".

The walls of the mezzanine also contain light boxes for photographic exhibits. The exhibits in the light boxes have included "The Great Escape", a series of nature-inspired photographs by Karine Laval, which were displayed starting in 2021.

==== Closed Herald Square passageway ====
The IND station's southern mezzanine originally extended south from 42nd Street to the 34th Street–Herald Square station. Proposed by the Board of Transportation in 1936, the passageway was outside of fare control but was intended to relieve passenger flow at the 42nd and 34th Street stations. At both ends of the passageway, pedestrians could descend to turnstiles at platform level. The passageway itself measured 35 feet (11 m) wide and was very plain in design, with white-tiled walls. There were entrances at 34th, 35th, 38th, and 40th Streets. At 35th Street, there was a smaller passageway extending westward to Broadway, near the northern end of the BMT Broadway Line station at 34th Street–Herald Square. Another passageway at 34th Street extended west to Eighth Avenue, providing direct access to Pennsylvania Station. According to a 1940 report from the New York Herald Tribune, the passageway was believed to be "the longest of its kind in the world".

In the 1980s, the passageway became a gathering spot for homeless people and drug users. On March 20, 1991, a woman was raped behind a pile of debris in the subway passageway during rush hour. Other commuters passed nearby but were unaware of what was happening. That passageway was closed the day after; it was used by 400 daily riders and recorded 30 felonies since January 1, 1990. In response, on March 28, 1991, the NYCTA ordered the closing of the 15 most dangerous passageways in the system within a week, which the Transit Police and citizen advocacy groups had called for since the previous year. A woman was raped in the passageway in July 1990 with no response, but after another rape took place in August, the passageway's closure was called for by the local community board in September when a woman was raped in this passageway. Bureaucratic delays had prevented their closure, with their presentation to the MTA Board not scheduled until April 1991, after a public hearing on systemwide service reduction was to be held. The agency feared that closing the passageway without public comment would have caused an outcry for advocates for the homeless. The NYCTA's director of public information said that the agency had erred in waiting for formal approval. The locations were chosen based on crime volume, lighting, traffic and physical layout. These entrances were closed under the declaration of a public safety emergency, and were blocked off with plywood and fencing until public hearings were held and official permission was obtained.

=== Exits ===
==== IND section ====
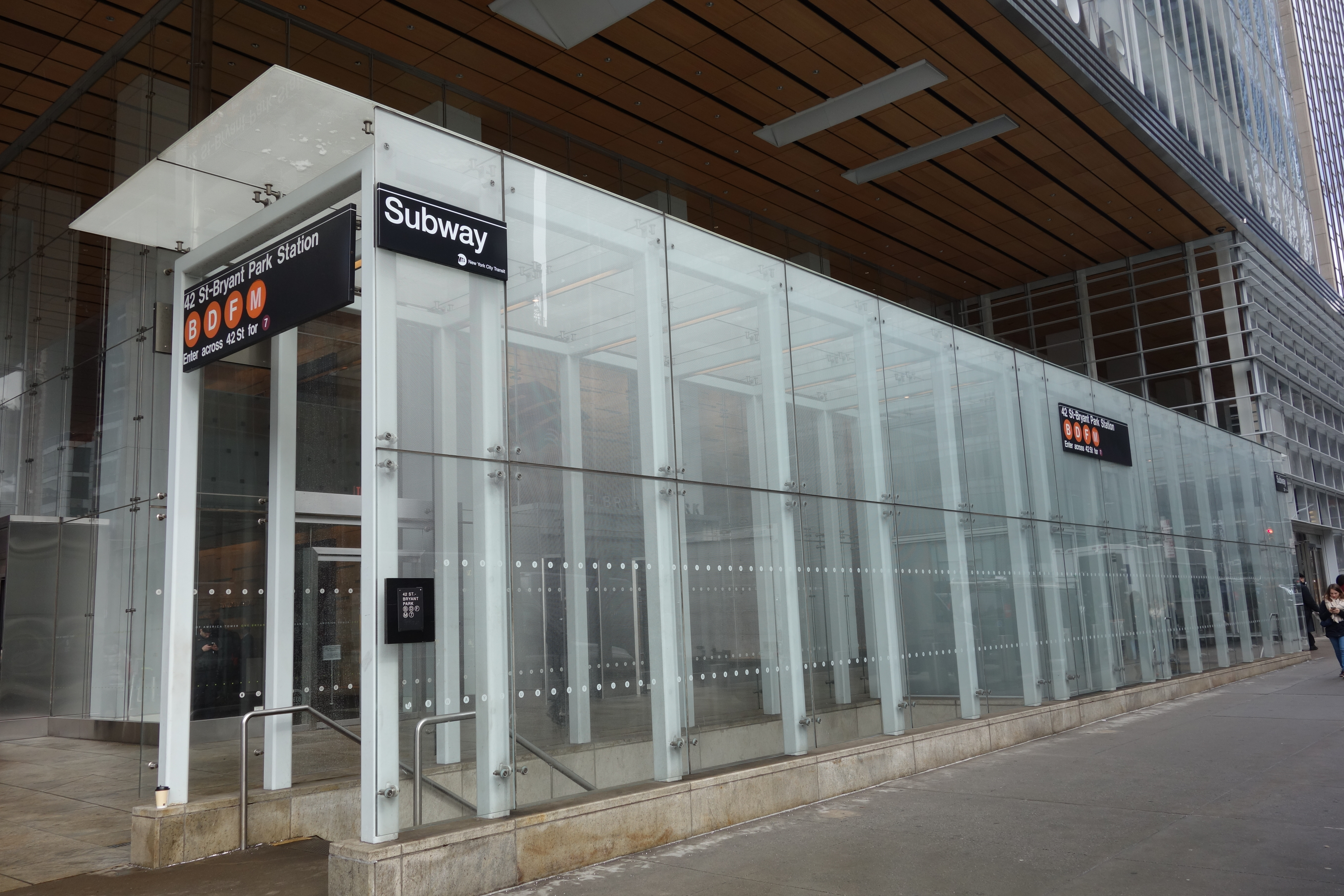
Entrance outside One Bryant Park

From the north mezzanine, a bank of regular turnstiles and High Entry-Exit Turnstiles (HEETs) provide access to and from the station. Outside fare control, a staircase goes up to the northeast corner of 42nd Street and Sixth Avenue. In addition, two staircases and an elevator go up to the northwest corner. The northwest-corner entrance is a glass enclosure; its glass roof contains a building-integrated photovoltaic (BIPV) installation, which produces some electricity for the structure.

On the north end of the southern mezzanine is a fare control area and the passageway to the IRT Flushing Line. A ramp and staircase leads to an intermediate landing under 1095 Avenue of the Americas, where a stair and elevator leads to the street. Two more staircases go up to the southeast corner of Sixth Avenue and 42nd Street. On the south end of this mezzanine is an unstaffed bank of regular and HEET turnstiles. Outside fare control, there are three staircases going up to the northwest, northeast, and southeast corners of 40th Street and Sixth Avenue with the northwestern one being built inside a building. There is another exit at the northwest corner of Sixth Avenue and 39th Street. The entrance has a 10 ft-wide (3.0 m) stairway and elevator from street level to a 15 ft-wide (4.6 m) passageway leading to the station. This replaced an entrance at the southwest corner of 40th Street and Sixth Avenue.

==== IRT section ====
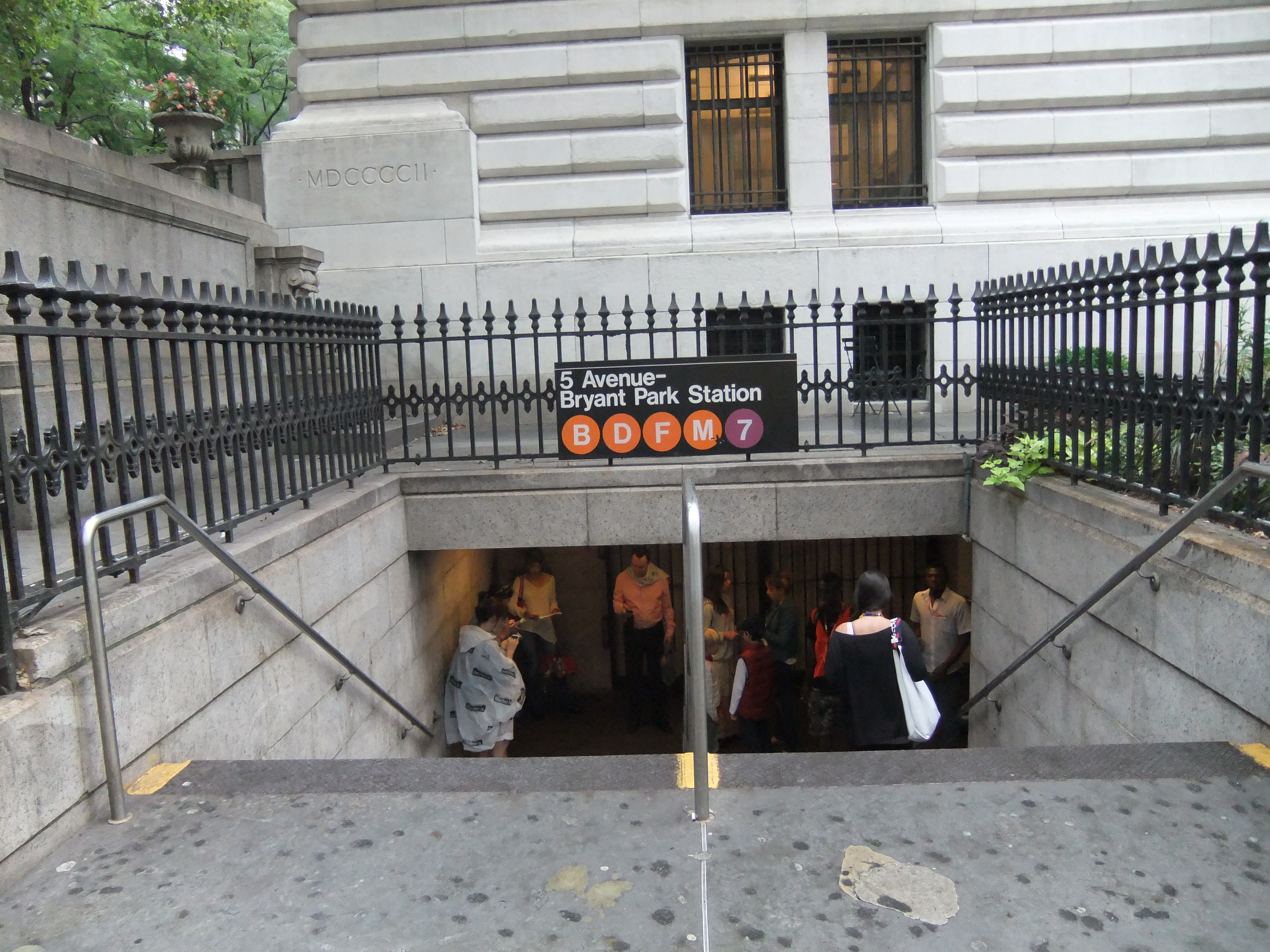
Entrance to the IRT section of the complex in front of the New York Public Library Main Branch

The IRT station has a full-length mezzanine directly above the platform and tracks; the full-time entrance is on the eastern end. A single stair on the southwest corner of 5th Avenue and 42nd Street (in front of the New York Public Library Main Branch) goes down to an area with a turnstile bank. This entrance was built within the library's stone balustrade. Near the western end is another fare control area with HEETs. Past the HEETs, two stairs ascend to the south side of 42nd Street between Fifth and Sixth Avenues on the northern edge of Bryant Park.

There is a closed passageway from the mezzanine to an easement entrance in the Grace Building on the north side of 42nd Street between Fifth Avenue and Sixth Avenue. This entrance closed before 2004.

== IND Sixth Avenue Line platforms ==
42 Street–Bryant Park
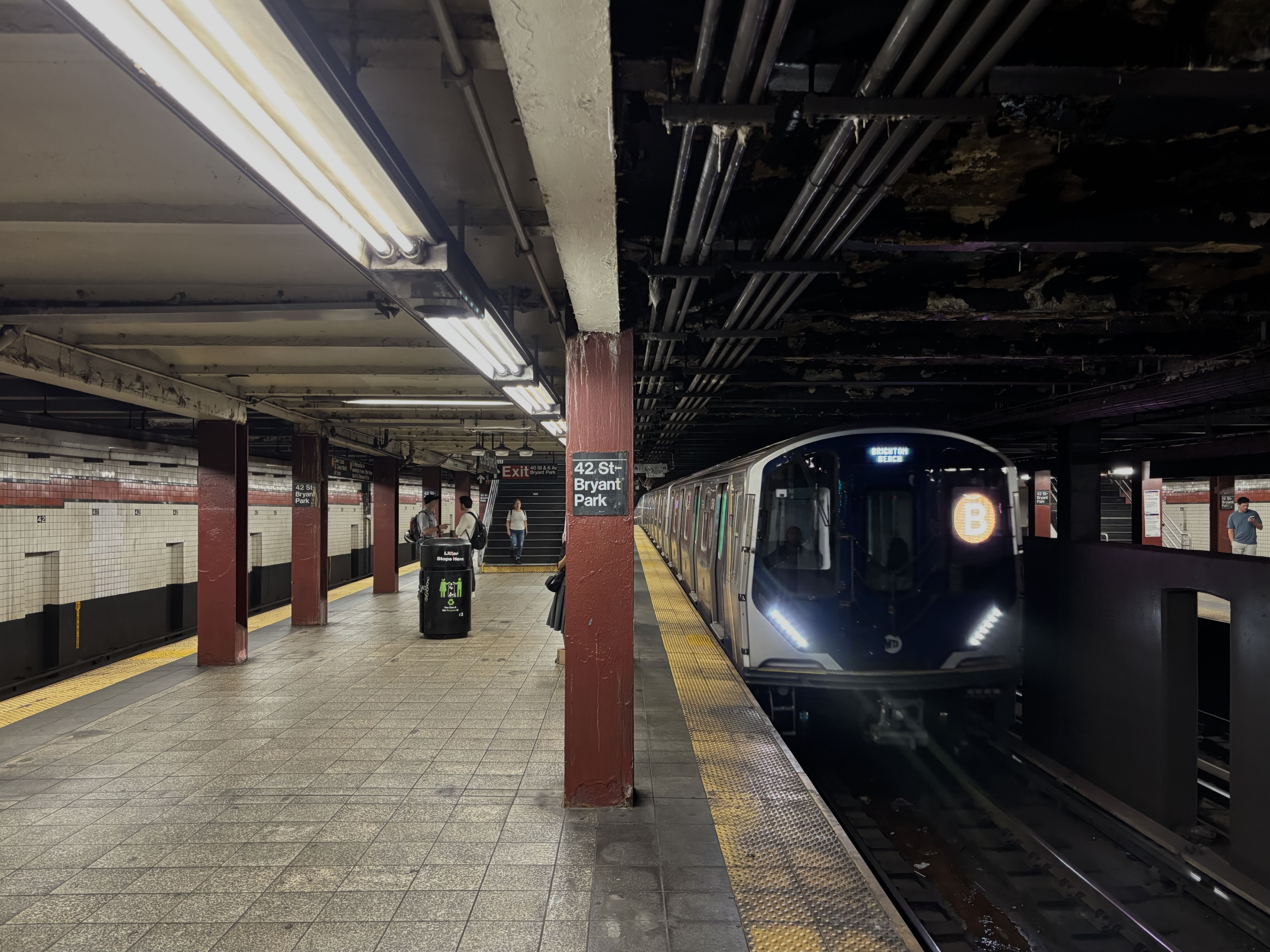
- R211A B train arriving at the southbound platform

Station statistics
- Division: B (IND)
- Line: IND Sixth Avenue Line
- Services: B (weekdays during the day); D (all times); F (all times) <F> (two rush hour trains, peak direction); M (weekdays during the day)
- Platforms: 2 island platforms cross-platform interchange
- Tracks: 4

Other information
- Opened: December 15, 1940; 85 years ago
- Accessible: Partially; access to mezzanine only, access to platforms under construction
- Accessibility: Cross-platform transfer available
Services
Preceding station	New York City Subway	Following station
47th–50th Streets–Rockefeller Center B D F <F> M northbound	B (New York City Subway service) D (New York City Subway service) F (New York City Subway service) M (New York City Subway service)	34th Street–Herald Square B D F <F> M southbound
Non-revenue services and lines
Preceding station	New York City Subway	Following station
47th–50th Streets–Rockefeller Center toward 21st Street–Queensbridge	JFK Express	34th Street–Herald Square toward Howard Beach–JFK Airport
Track layout
Station service legend
Symbol	Description
Stops all times	Stops all times
Stops all times except late nights	Stops all times except late nights
Stops weekdays during the day	Stops weekdays during the day
Stops rush hours in the peak direction only (limited service)	Stops rush hours in the peak direction only (limited service)

The 42nd Street–Bryant Park station on the IND Sixth Avenue Line is an express station with four tracks and two island platforms, which are 670 feet (200 m) long. The D and F stop here at all times, while the B and M stop here only on weekdays during the day. The B and D run on the express tracks and the F and M run on the local tracks. On all four Sixth Avenue routes, the station is between 47th–50th Streets–Rockefeller Center to the north and 34th Street–Herald Square to the south.

Both outer track walls have a scarlet red trim line with a chocolate brown border and small tile captions reading "42" in white on black run below them at regular intervals. Red I-beam columns run along both sides of both platforms at regular intervals with alternating ones having the standard black station name plate in white lettering.

The ceiling of the platform level is held up by columns located every 15 feet (4.6 m), which support girders underneath the station's full-length mezzanine. The floor of the mezzanine is also supported by cross beams spaced every 5 feet (1.5 m), placed between the girders. The roof of the mezzanine is about 10 feet (3.0 m) below street level.

One stair ascends from the north end of either platform to a passageway, which in turn connects to the 42nd Street Shuttle station at Times Square–42nd Street. This passageway is only open between 6 a.m. and midnight, when the shuttle is operational. The passageway is not connected to either of the mezzanines and is not ADA-accessible. An artwork by Nick Cave, Every One (2021), is installed in the passageway between the Times Square and 42nd Street–Bryant Park stations. It consists of a mosaic flanking 11 digital screens; one side of the mosaic measures 143 feet (44 m) long and the other measures 179 feet (55 m) long.

South of this station, there are three sets of crossovers, allowing trains to switch between all four tracks. These switches are not currently used in revenue service. The crossovers were reconfigured to reduce the duplication of track switches of the downtown and uptown tracks, most notably, the switch from the express to local tracks.

== IRT Flushing Line platform ==
5 Avenue
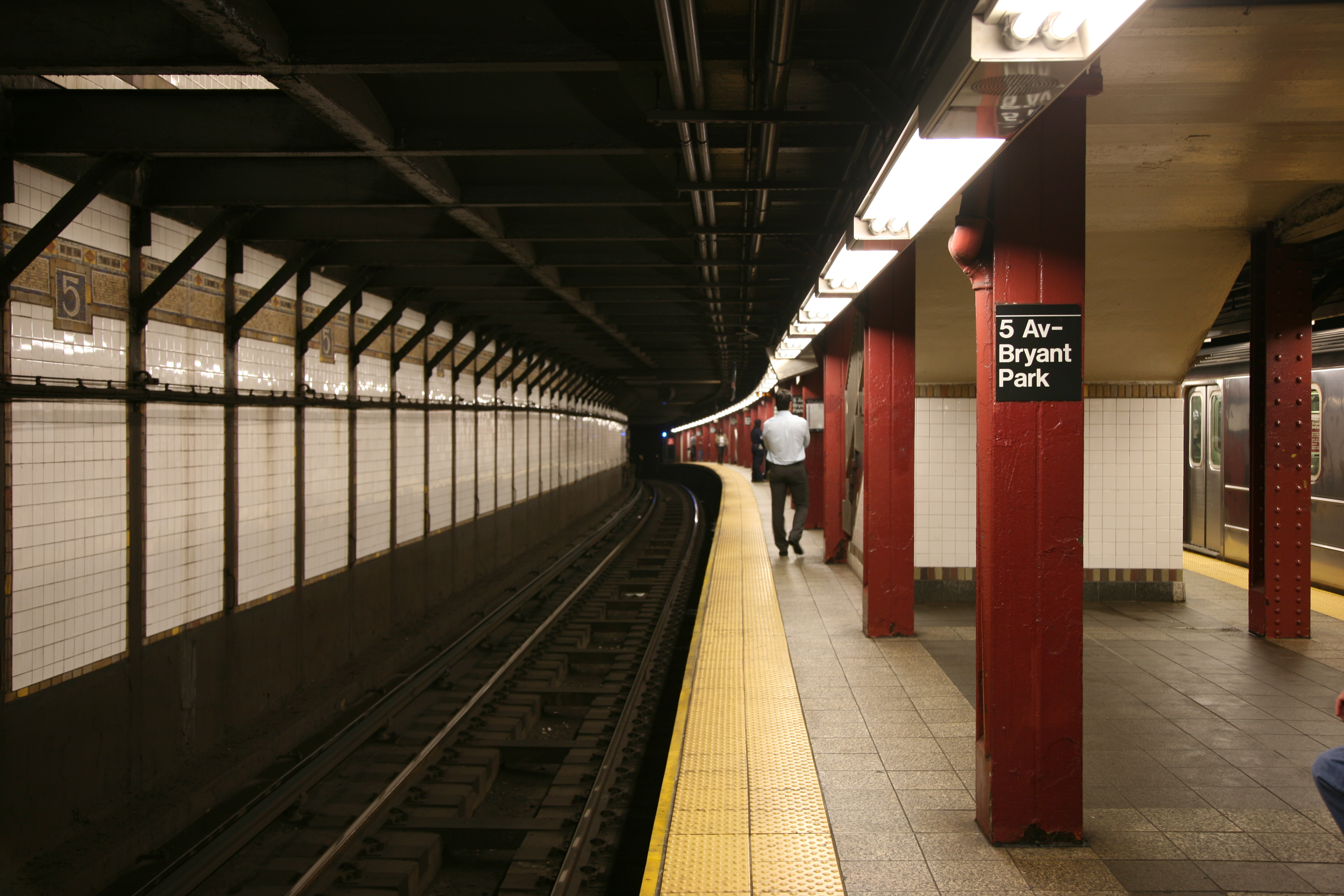
- The IRT Flushing Line platform

Station statistics
- Division: A (IRT)
- Line: IRT Flushing Line
- Services: 7 (all times) <7> (rush hours until 9:30 p.m., peak direction)
- Platforms: 1 island platform
- Tracks: 2

Other information
- Opened: March 22, 1926; 100 years ago
- Accessible: Partially; access to mezzanine only, access to platforms under construction
- Former/other names: Fifth Avenue–Bryant Park
Services
Preceding station	New York City Subway	Following station
Times Square–42nd Street 7 <7> toward 34th Street–Hudson Yards	7 (New York City Subway service)	Grand Central–42nd Street 7 <7> toward Flushing–Main Street
Track layout
Station service legend
Symbol	Description
Stops all times	Stops all times
Stops all times except late nights	Stops all times except late nights
Stops rush hours in the peak direction only	Stops rush hours in the peak direction only

The Fifth Avenue station (signed as Fifth Avenue–Bryant Park) on the IRT Flushing Line has two tracks and one island platform, which is 566 feet (173 m) long. It serves the 7 train at all times and the <7> train on weekdays in the peak direction (westbound in the morning, eastbound in the afternoon). The next station to the west is Times Square, while the next station to the east is Grand Central.

Fixed platform barriers, which are intended to prevent commuters falling to the tracks, are positioned near the platform edges. The ceiling of the platform level is held up by columns located every 15 feet (4.6 m), which support girders underneath the station's full-length mezzanine. The floor of the mezzanine is also supported by cross beams spaced every 5 feet (1.5 m), placed between the girders. Above the mezzanine, there are ventilation grates directly behind the parapet that surrounds Bryant Park. The platform walls have a mosaic golden trimline with "5" tablets at regular intervals along it.

The Fifth Avenue station is the first within the subway system to receive a vending machine that dispenses make up and other retail products. Part of a pilot program to increase retail activity within the MTA system, it capitalized on a new trend in vending machine development when it was installed in 2013.
