= 14th Street/Sixth Avenue station =

New York City Subway station in Manhattan

14 Street/6 Avenue
- New York City Subway station complex
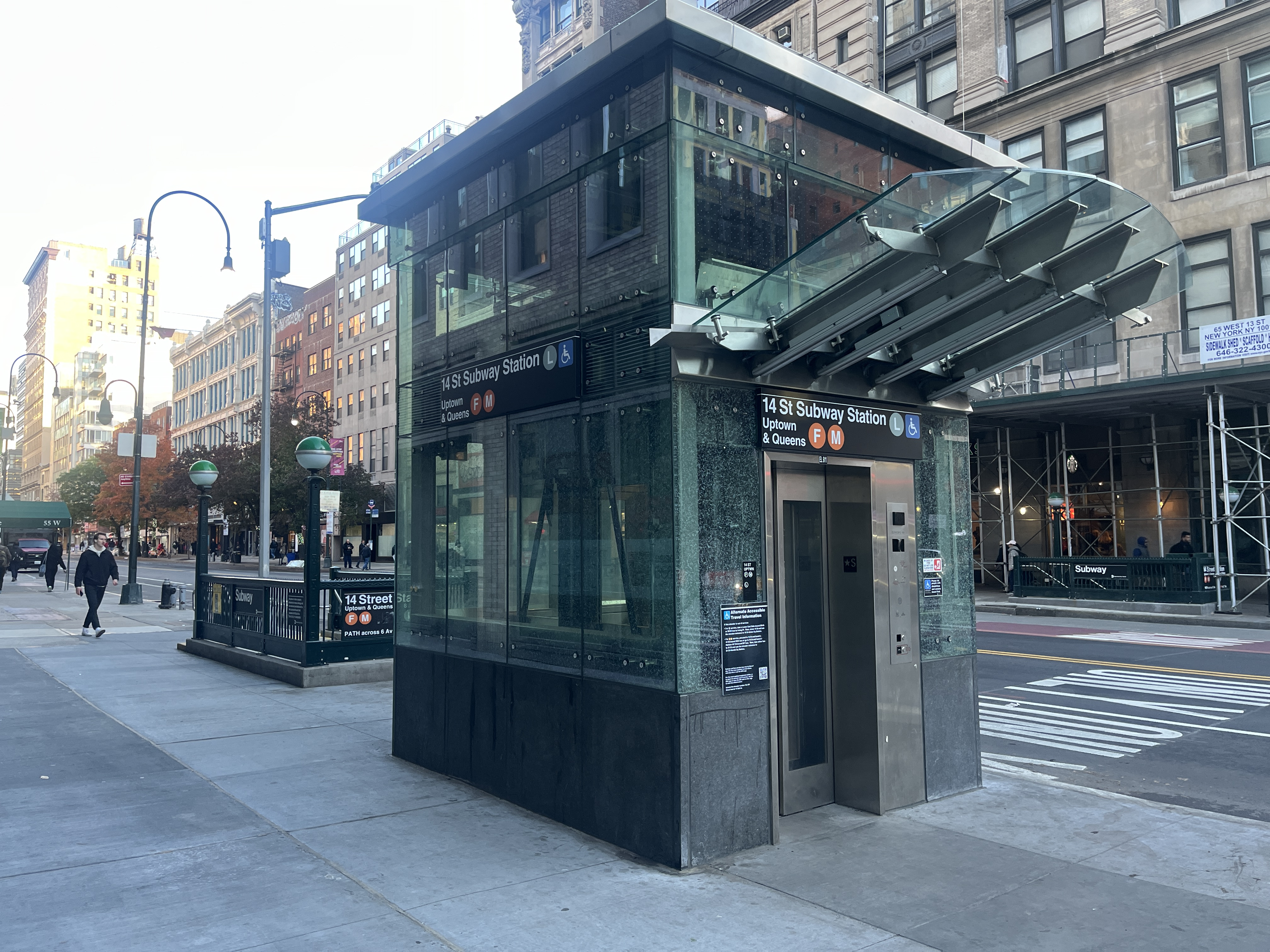
- Stair and elevator entrances, on the northeast corner of 6th Avenue and 14th Street

Station statistics
- Address: West 14th Street, Sixth & Seventh Avenues; New York, New York
- Borough: Manhattan
- Locale: Chelsea, Greenwich Village
- Coordinates: 40.737328°N 73.996796°W
- Division: A (IRT), B (BMT, IND)
- Line: IRT Broadway–Seventh Avenue Line; BMT Canarsie Line; IND Sixth Avenue Line
- Services: 1 (all times); 2 (all times); 3 (all except late nights); F (all times) <F> (two rush hour trains, peak direction); L (all times); M (weekdays during the day)
- Transit: NYCT Bus: M7, M14A SBS, M14D SBS, M20, M55, X27, X28, SIM1C, SIM3C, SIM4C, SIM7, SIM9, SIM33, SIM33C; PATH: JSQ–33, HOB–33, JSQ–33 (via HOB) (at 14th Street)
- Levels: 3

Other information
- Opened: July 1, 1918; 108 years ago (Seventh Avenue Line platforms); September 24, 1924; 102 years ago (Canarsie Line platform); December 15, 1940; 85 years ago (Sixth Avenue Line platforms)
- Accessible: Yes (Transfer passageways between IND Sixth Avenue Line platforms and rest of the station are not accessible; OMNY farecard readers must be used for free accessible transfer)

Traffic
- 2025: 11,357,788 ▲7.9%
- Rank: 18 out of 423
Location
Location within New York City Subway
Location within New York City
Location within New York
Street map
Station service legend
Symbol	Description
Stops all times except late nights	Stops all times except late nights
Stops all times	Stops all times
Stops rush hours in the peak direction only (limited service)	Stops rush hours in the peak direction only (limited service)
Stops weekdays during the day	Stops weekdays during the day

The 14th Street/Sixth Avenue station is an underground New York City Subway station complex in the Greenwich Village and Chelsea neighborhoods of Manhattan, on the IRT Broadway–Seventh Avenue Line, the BMT Canarsie Line and the IND Sixth Avenue Line. It is located on 14th Street between Sixth Avenue (Avenue of the Americas) and Seventh Avenue. It is served by the 1, 2, F, and L trains at all times, the 3 train at all times except late nights, the M train during weekdays, and the <F> train during rush hours in the peak direction.

A connection is available from this complex to the PATH station at 14th Street and Sixth Avenue. There is a direct passageway from this complex to the PATH station's southbound platform; transferring between this complex and the northbound PATH platform requires exiting onto street level first.

== History ==
=== Dual Contracts construction ===
After the opening of the original subway line, operated by the Interborough Rapid Transit Company (IRT), the New York City government began planning new lines. As part of the proposed Tri-borough system, both the IRT and the Brooklyn Rapid Transit Company (BRT; later the Brooklyn–Manhattan Transit Corporation or BMT) wished to develop an east–west line under 14th Street in Manhattan. The IRT also sought to operate a north–south route in Manhattan along Seventh Avenue south of Times Square. The Seventh Avenue and 14th Street lines were both assigned to the BRT in 1911 after the IRT refused to agree to a compromise over the Tri-borough system.

By mid-1912, the Public Service Commission was determining the locations of stations on the Seventh Avenue Line. The commission wished to add express stops at 34th Street–Penn Station to the north and Chambers Street to the south, but The New York Times reported that the 14th Street station would likely be a local stop because businesses had begun moving away from 14th Street. In September 1912, merchants near 14th Street began advocating for the construction of an express station there, saying the Chambers Street and 34th Street stations were 2.5 miles (4.0 km) apart. Merchants on 23rd Street, conversely, advocated for the construction of an express stop on that street because businesses were moving to 23rd Street.

==== Broadway–Seventh Avenue Line ====
The Dual Contracts between the government of New York City, the BMT, and the IRT were signed in 1913. As part of Contract 4, the IRT agreed to build a branch of the original subway line south down Seventh Avenue, Varick Street, and West Broadway to serve the West Side of Manhattan. The construction of this line, in conjunction with the construction of the Lexington Avenue Line, would change the operations of the IRT system. Instead of having trains go via Broadway, turning onto 42nd Street, before finally turning onto Park Avenue, there would be two trunk lines connected by the 42nd Street Shuttle. The system would be changed from looking like a "Z" system on a map to an "H" system. One trunk would run via the new Lexington Avenue Line down Park Avenue, and the other trunk would run via the new Seventh Avenue Line up Broadway. In order for the line to continue down Varick Street and West Broadway, these streets needed to be widened, and two new streets were built, the Seventh Avenue Extension and the Varick Street Extension. It was predicted that the subway extension would lead to the growth of the Lower West Side, and to neighborhoods such as Chelsea and Greenwich Village.

As part of the Dual Contracts, the IRT was authorized to construct an express station on its Seventh Avenue Line at 14th Street. The Christopher Street and 14th Street stations were to be built as part of section 4 of the Seventh Avenue Line, running between Commerce Street and 16th Street. This contract was awarded in March 1914 to the United States Realty and Investment Company, who made a low bid of $1.837 million. By early 1917, the section of the Seventh Avenue Line from 14th to 42nd Street was nearly complete, and workers were restoring the portion of Seventh Avenue between 14th and 42nd Streets. A short section of the new line opened between 42nd Street and 34th Street–Penn Station in June 1917. A further extension from 34th to 14th Street was initially scheduled to open by the end of the year, but the extension to 14th Street was still incomplete by that December.

14th Street opened as part of an extension of the line from 34th Street–Penn Station to South Ferry on July 1, 1918. Initially, the station was served by a shuttle running from Times Square to South Ferry. The new "H" system was implemented on August 1, 1918, joining the two halves of the Broadway–Seventh Avenue Line and sending all West Side trains south from Times Square. An immediate result of the switch was the need to transfer using the 42nd Street Shuttle. The completion of the "H" system doubled the capacity of the IRT system.

==== Canarsie Line ====
The Dual Contracts also called for the construction of a subway under 14th Street, to run to Canarsie in Brooklyn; this became the Canarsie Line. The BRT was authorized to construct a station on its Canarsie Line at Sixth Avenue and 14th Street. In late 1915, the Public Service Commission began receiving bids for the construction of the 14th Street Line. Booth and Flinn was awarded the first contract for the line, namely a tunnel under the East River, in January 1916. At the time, the Public Service Commission was completing plans for the rest of the line; the commission began accepting bids for two parts of the line within Manhattan, sections 1 and 2. in April 1916. The next month, Booth and Flinn won the contract for section 1, which was to cost $2.528 million. By early 1919, the section of the line under 14th Street was about 20 percent completed.

In 1922, the Charles H. Brown & Son Corporation was contracted to build out the Canarsie Line's stations in Manhattan, including the Sixth Avenue station. Track-laying in the tunnels between Sixth and Montrose Avenues started in the last week of October 1922. The Canarsie Line's Sixth Avenue station opened on June 30, 1924, as the terminal of the 14th Street–Eastern Line, which ran from Sixth Avenue under the East River and through Williamsburg to Montrose and Bushwick Avenues. Service was extended east to Canarsie on July 14, 1928, but continued to terminate at Sixth Avenue. The new line reduced overcrowding at the Canal Street station in Lower Manhattan.

=== Sixth Avenue Line ===
New York City mayor John Francis Hylan's original plans for the Independent Subway System (IND), proposed in 1922, included building over 100 miles (160 km) of new lines and taking over nearly 100 miles (160 km) of existing lines, which would compete with the IRT and the BMT, the two major subway operators of the time. The New York City Board of Transportation (BOT) approved the IND Sixth Avenue Line in 1925; the line was to run from Midtown Manhattan underneath Sixth Avenue, Houston Street, Essex Street, and the Rutgers Street Tunnel to Downtown Brooklyn. The IND Sixth Avenue Line was designed to replace the elevated IRT Sixth Avenue Line.

The Midtown section of the Sixth Avenue Line was difficult to construct because part of this stretch of Sixth Avenue was already occupied by the Hudson & Manhattan Railroad (H&M)'s Uptown Hudson Tubes, which ran between Eighth and 33rd Streets. As a result, negotiations between the city and the H&M continued for several years. The IND and H&M finally came to an agreement in 1930. The city had decided to build the IND Sixth Avenue Line's local tracks around the pre-existing H&M tubes, and add express tracks for the IND underneath the H&M tubes at a later date. However, the IND had not yet finalized the locations of Sixth Avenue Line stations between 42nd and Fourth Streets because it was still negotiating with the H&M.

The Midtown section of the Sixth Avenue Line did not begin construction until March 1936. The final contract for the line, covering the section between 9th and 18th Streets, was awarded to Spencer White & Prentis in June 1937. Workers had to navigate around the various utilities and tunnels above, below, and beside the line. The section of the line between 9th and 18th Streets was constructed using compressed air and tunneling shields, in contrast to much of the rest of the line, which was built using a cut-and-cover method. Builders had to use very small charges of dynamite so that they would not disrupt the H&M tunnels alongside the route, the street and elevated line above, and the water main below. The Sixth Avenue Elevated had to be underpinned during construction, and workers had to be careful not to cause cracks in the Catskill Aqueduct, which was located around 200 feet (61 m) below the avenue's surface. The H&M's 14th Street station had to be rebuilt to provide space for the IND's 14th Street station, which would be located at a similar elevation.

The Sixth Avenue Line's 14th Street station opened on December 15, 1940, along with the rest of the IND Sixth Avenue Line from West Fourth Street–Washington Square to 47th–50th Streets–Rockefeller Center. The opening of the Sixth Avenue Line relieved train traffic on the Eighth Avenue Line, which was used by all IND services except for the G Brooklyn–Queens Crosstown service. When the Sixth Avenue Line's 14th Street station opened, the F train served the station at all times.

=== Consolidation as a station complex ===
The city government took over the BMT's operations on June 1, 1940, and the IRT's operations on June 12, 1940. In 1947, the New York City Board of Transportation (BOT) replaced the incandescent lightbulbs in the Sixth Avenue Line's 14th Street station with fluorescent lamps as part of an experiment to improve illumination in subway stations.

A free transfer between the Canarsie Line platform and the Sixth Avenue Line platforms opened on May 9, 1966. On January 16, 1978, a free transfer passageway connecting the 14th Street station on the IRT Broadway–Seventh Avenue Line and the stations on the BMT Canarsie Line and the IND Sixth Avenue Line opened.

==== Accessibility improvements ====
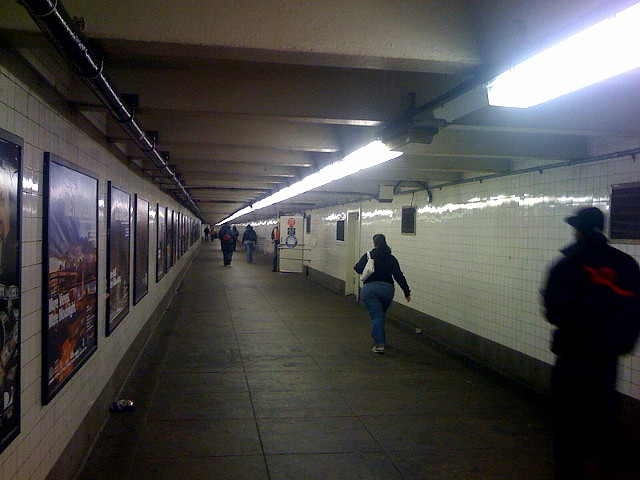
The transfer passageway in 2008, prior to renovation

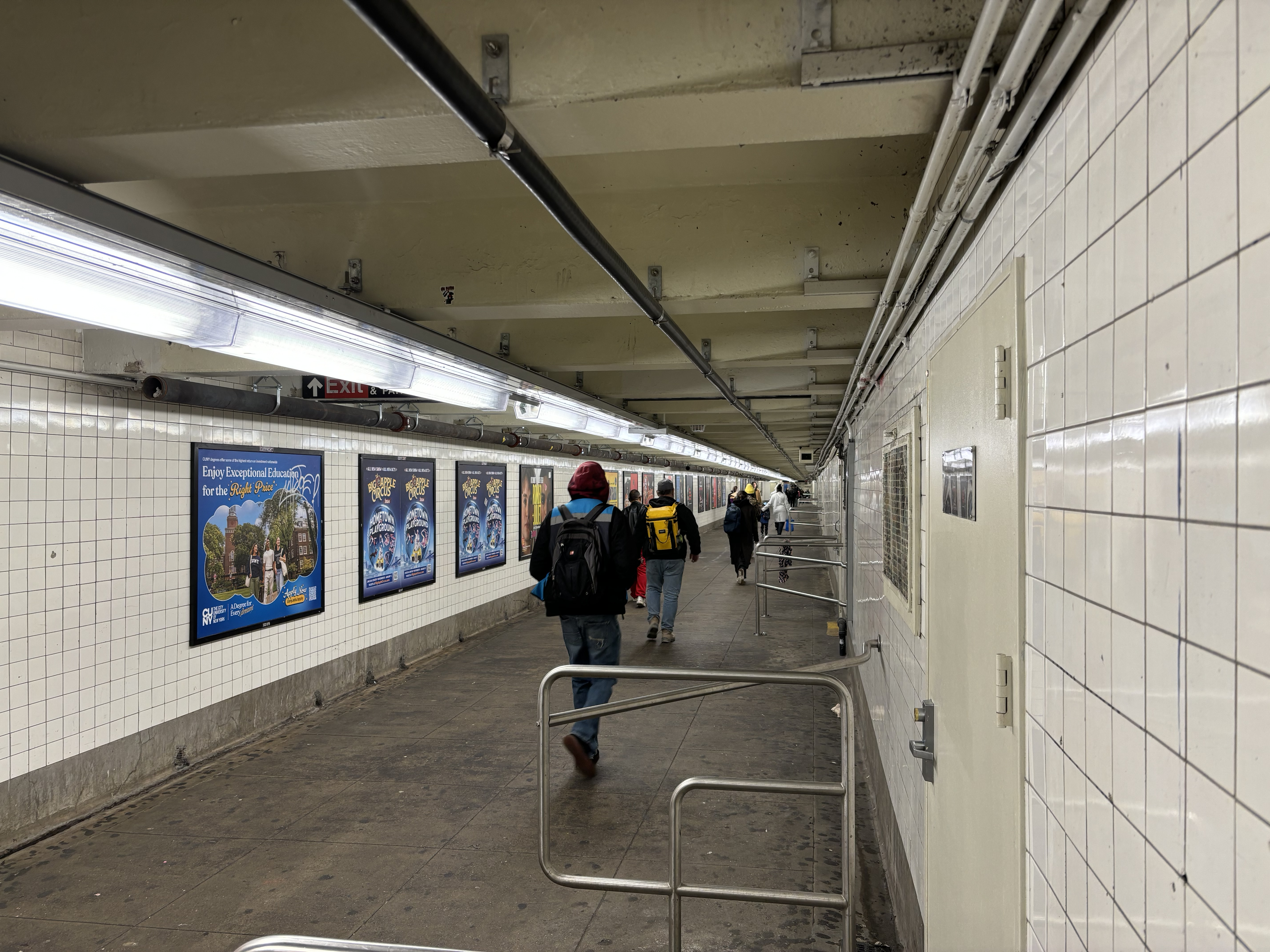
The renovated transfer passageway in 2024

In 2018, the MTA allocated some funding for Americans with Disabilities Act of 1990 (ADA) improvements at the Sixth Avenue/14th Street station. Originally, the improvements were scheduled for the Sixth Avenue and Canarsie Lines only. The entire station complex except for the PATH station was to receive elevators starting in 2022. As of February 2021, funding had been committed to accessibility renovations at the 14th Street/Sixth Avenue station. A contract for nine elevators at the station complex was awarded in November 2021.

Between February 27, 2023, and December 11, 2023, the transfer passageway between Sixth and Seventh Avenues was closed for the installation of elevators and reconfiguring of the ramp as a part to make the station compliant with the ADA. A free out-of-system transfer was available while the passageway was closed. The work involves constructing nine elevators: two from the IRT platforms to the mezzanine; one from the mezzanine to street level at Seventh Avenue; two from the lower mezzanine levels to the BMT platform; two from each IND platform to upper mezzanine; and two more from both the BMT and IND mezzanine levels to street level at Sixth Avenue.

On August 19, 2024, the first three elevators opened, making the northbound IND Sixth Avenue Line platform and the BMT Canarsie Line platform accessible. An additional two elevators – one from street level at Seventh Avenue to the IRT mezzanine and another from that mezzanine to the northbound IRT Broadway-Seventh Avenue Line platform – opened on November 2, 2024. The remaining four elevators were opened in mid-December 2024, making the southbound IND Sixth Avenue Line platform, the southbound IRT Broadway-Seventh Avenue Line platform, and the transfer passageway between the IRT Broadway-Seventh Avenue Line platforms and the BMT Canarsie Line platform accessible. Work also included the renovation of 39 stairs, the addition of 25 more stairs, and the reopening of a fare control area that was closed in 1992.

== Station layout ==
- The IRT Broadway–Seventh Avenue Line platforms and the other lines' platforms are one block apart.
- The express tracks of the IND Sixth Avenue Line run under the complex but are not part of the station.
- The PATH platforms are at 14th Street and Sixth Avenue, between the IND Sixth Avenue Line platforms, but require the payment of a separate fare.

== IRT Broadway–Seventh Avenue Line platforms ==
14 Street
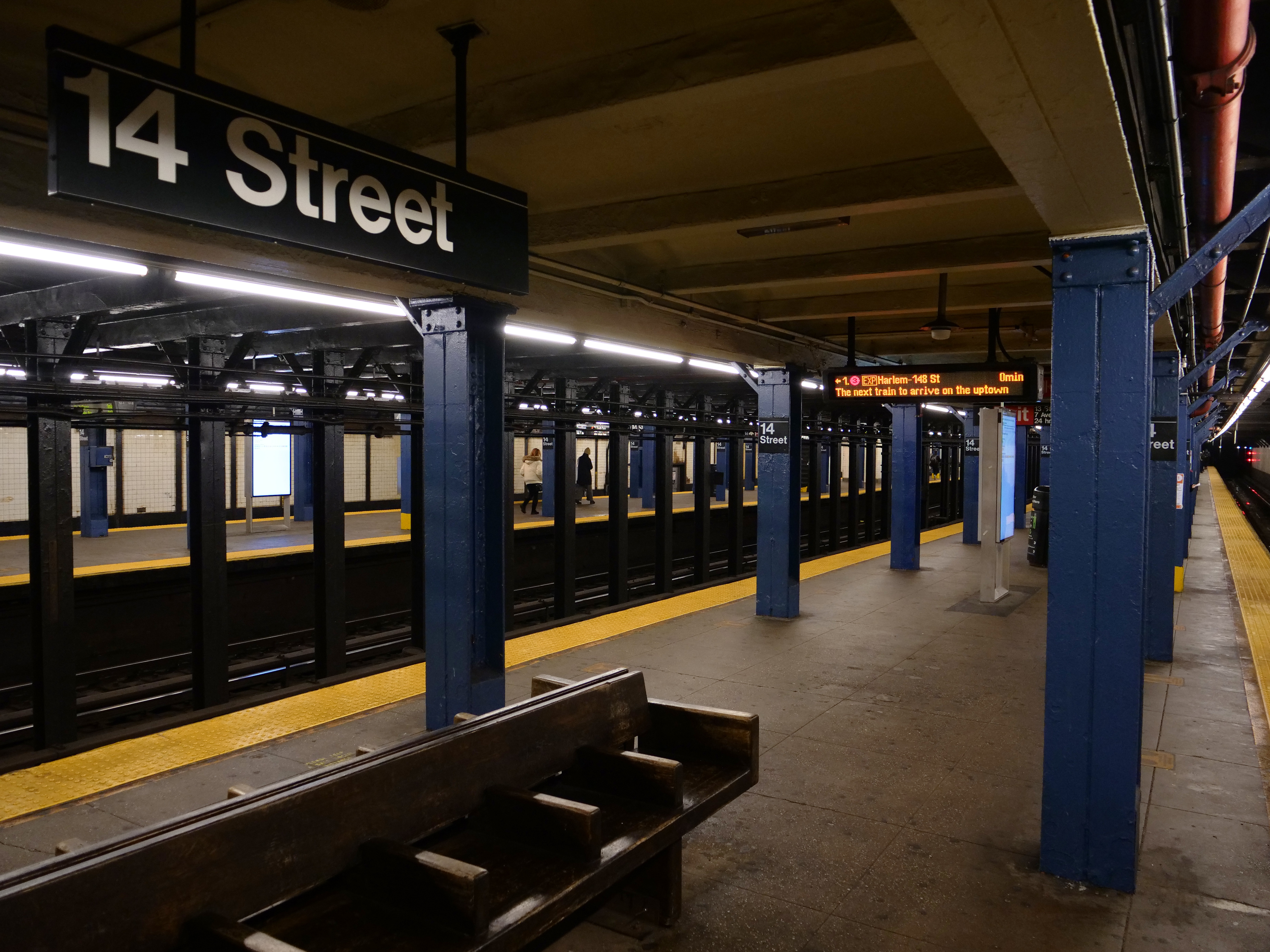
- View from northbound platform

Station statistics
- Division: A (IRT)
- Line: IRT Broadway–Seventh Avenue Line
- Services: 1 (all times); 2 (all times); 3 (all except late nights)
- Structure: Underground
- Platforms: 2 island platforms cross-platform interchange
- Tracks: 4

Other information
- Opened: July 1, 1918; 108 years ago
- Accessible: Yes (Use OMNY farecard readers to transfer to IND Sixth Avenue Line platforms)
Services
Preceding station	New York City Subway	Following station
34th Street–Penn Station 2 3 via 135th Street	Express	Chambers Street 2 3 via Franklin Avenue–Medgar Evers College
18th Street 1 2 toward Van Cortlandt Park–242nd Street	Local	Christopher Street–Stonewall 1 2 toward South Ferry
Track layout
Station service legend
Symbol	Description
Stops all times except late nights	Stops all times except late nights
Stops all times	Stops all times
Stops late nights only	Stops late nights only

The 14th Street station (referred to on some strip maps as 14th Street–7th Avenue) is an express station on the IRT Broadway–Seventh Avenue Line, consisting of four tracks and two island platforms. The local tracks are used by the 1 at all times and by the 2 during the night; the express tracks are used by the 2 and 3 during daytime hours. The next stop to the north is 18th Street for local trains and 34th Street–Penn Station for express trains, while the next stop to the south is Christopher Street–Stonewall for local trains and Chambers Street for express trains.

The track walls on both sides of the platform have their original IRT mosaic trim line with "14" tablets on it at regular intervals. Both platforms have blue I-beam columns that run along both sides at regular intervals with alternating ones having the standard black station name plate in white lettering.

=== Exits ===
This station has three fare control areas. The full-time entrance is at the north end. Two staircases and an elevator from each platform lead to a crossover that has a newsstand in the center, two now defunct restrooms above the southbound platforms and tracks (mosaic signs reading "MEN" and "WOMEN" remain intact), and two full height turnstiles above the northbound platform and tracks (one entry/exit and one exit-only) leading to a staircase that goes up to the southeast corner of 14th Street and Seventh Avenue. There is also a passageway leading to the BMT Canarsie platforms on Sixth Avenue, which in turn allows a free transfer to the IND Sixth Avenue Line platforms. The full-time turnstile bank at the center of the crossover opposite the newsstand leads to a mezzanine containing a token booth, three staircases going up to the either northern corners as well as the southwest corner of 14th Street and Seventh Avenue. Directional mosaics at the southwest corner entrance also indicate that there was a passage leading to 14th Street/Eighth Avenue; this passage has been closed since 1991 due to safety concerns.

The station has an exit-only area at the center. Two staircases from each platform go up to a crossover where on either side, a single exit-only turnstile and emergency gate leads to a staircase that goes up to either northern corners of 13th Street and Seventh Avenue.

The station has an unstaffed fare control area at the south end. A single staircase from each platform leads to a crossover and a bank of turnstiles as well as one exit-only and one full-height turnstile. The mezzanine has a now-unused customer assistance booth and two staircases going up to both northern corners of 12th Street and Seventh Avenue.

== IND Sixth Avenue Line platforms ==
14 Street
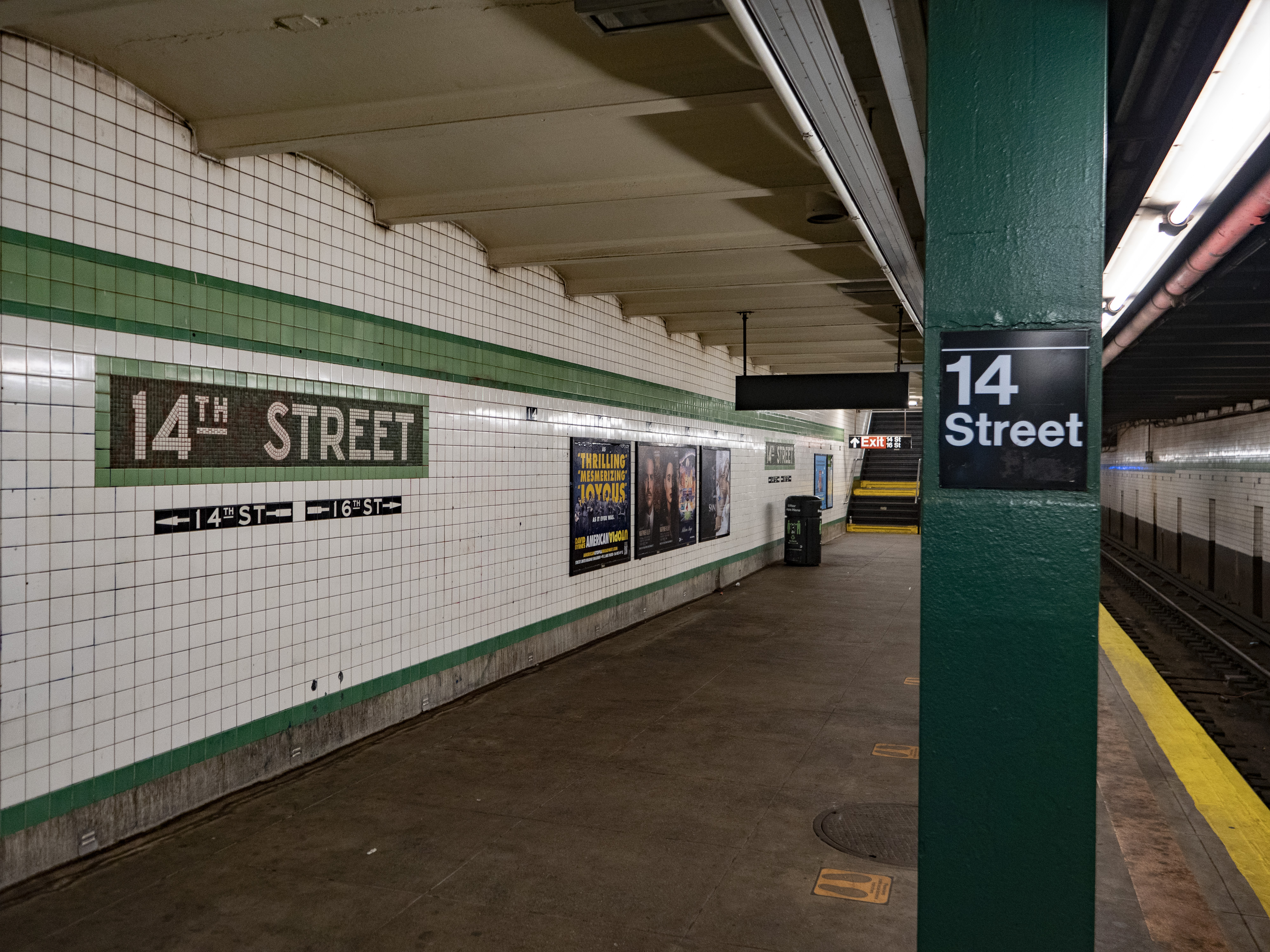
- Northbound platform

Station statistics
- Division: B (IND)
- Line: IND Sixth Avenue Line
- Services: F (all times) <F> (two rush hour trains, peak direction); M (weekdays during the day)
- Platforms: 2 side platforms
- Tracks: 2

Other information
- Opened: December 15, 1940; 85 years ago
- Accessible: Yes (Use OMNY farecard readers to transfer to rest of the station)
Services
Preceding station	New York City Subway	Following station
23rd Street F <F> M via 47th–50th Streets–Rockefeller Center	Local	West Fourth Street–Washington Square F <F> M via Broadway–Lafayette Street
and do not stop here
Track layout
Station service legend
Symbol	Description
Stops all times	Stops all times
Stops all times except late nights	Stops all times except late nights
Stops weekdays during the day	Stops weekdays during the day
Stops rush hours in the peak direction only (limited service)	Stops rush hours in the peak direction only (limited service)

The 14th Street station is a local station on the IND Sixth Avenue Line, and has two side platforms to the inside of the tracks. The station is served by the F at all times and by the M on weekdays during the day. It is between 23rd Street to the north and West Fourth Street–Washington Square the south.

Both platforms have a green trim line on a darker green border and mosaic name tablets reading "14TH STREET" in white sans-serif lettering on a dark green background and a lighter green border. Beneath the trim line and name tablets are small directional and number tile captions in white lettering on a black background. Forest green I-beam columns run along both platforms at regular intervals with alternating ones having the standard black name plate with white lettering.

Trains open their doors to the left in both directions, which is unusual for a side platformed station in New York City. Most side platforms in the system are to the outside of the tracks and thus trains open the doors to the right. In the case of 14th Street, because the platforms of the PATH's Uptown Hudson Tubes already existed along Sixth Avenue, the Sixth Avenue Line platforms flank the existing PATH station, leaving the PATH tracks behind the Sixth Avenue platform walls which are not visible from the platforms.

The Sixth Avenue express tracks used by the B and D are at a lower level beneath the PATH tracks and are also not visible from the platforms. The deep-bore tunnel's round shape becomes square below this station and at 23rd Street, where provisions for lower-level platforms were built.

There is a full length mezzanine over the platforms and tracks.

=== Exits ===
There are entrance/exits at both 14th Street and 16th Street, with fare controls at both ends. The 14th Street entrance is shared with the PATH station of the same name, which has a separate fare control. At both intersections, exits lead to all four corners. At the extreme south end of each platform, there is a single-wide stairway descending to the Canarsie Line platform.

== BMT Canarsie Line platform ==
6 Avenue
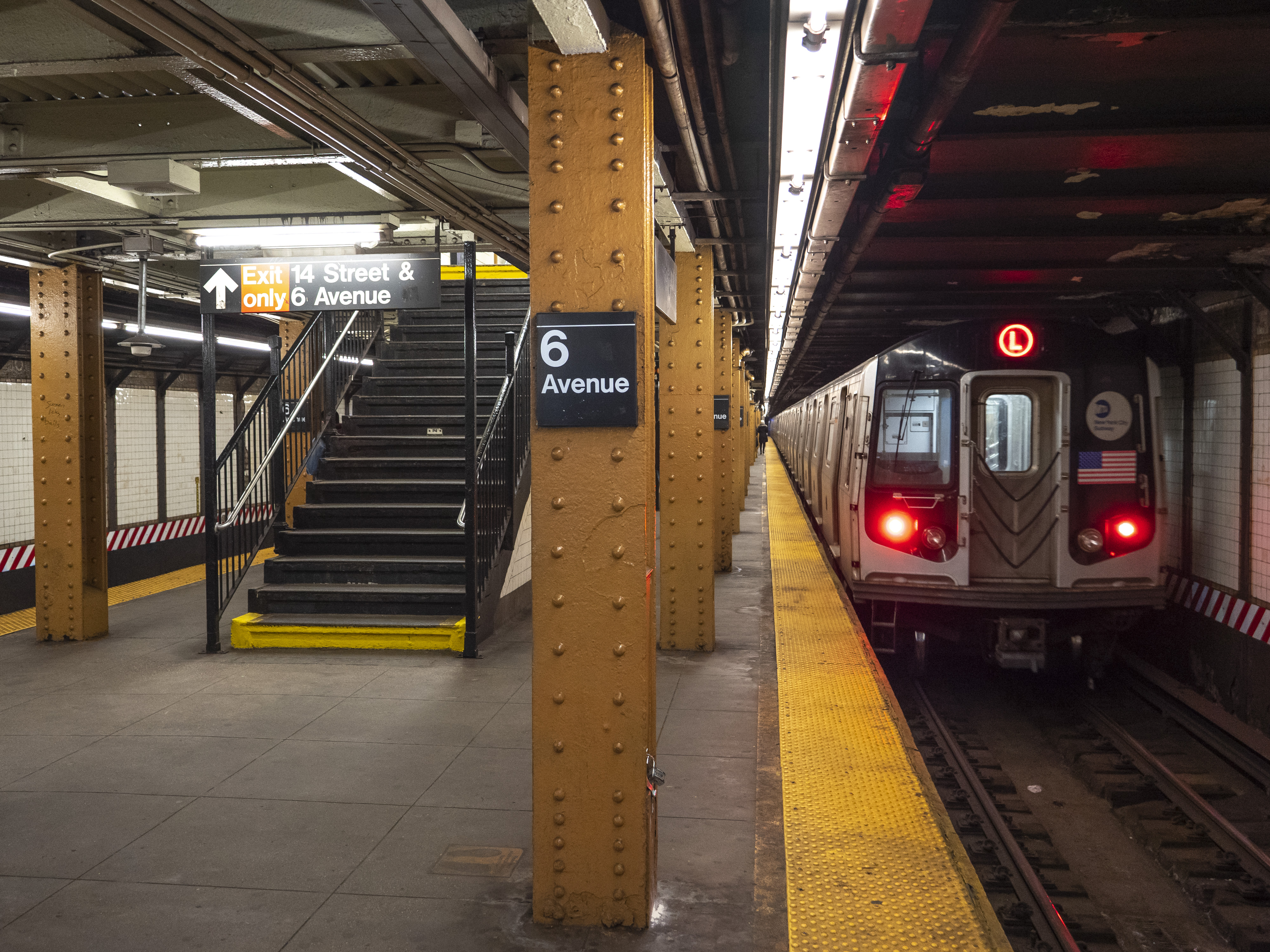
- Northbound R143 L train departing

Station statistics
- Division: B (BMT)
- Line: BMT Canarsie Line
- Services: L (all times)
- Structure: Underground
- Platforms: 1 island platform
- Tracks: 2

Other information
- Opened: June 30, 1924; 102 years ago
- Accessible: Yes (Use OMNY farecard readers to transfer to IND Sixth Avenue Line platforms)
Services
Preceding station	New York City Subway	Following station
Eighth Avenue Terminus	L (New York City Subway service)	Union Square toward Canarsie–Rockaway Parkway
Track layout
Station service legend
Symbol	Description
Stops all times	Stops all times
Stops all times except late nights	Stops all times except late nights

The Sixth Avenue station on the BMT Canarsie Line has one island platform and two tracks. The station is served by the L at all times. It is between Eighth Avenue to the west and Union Square to the east.

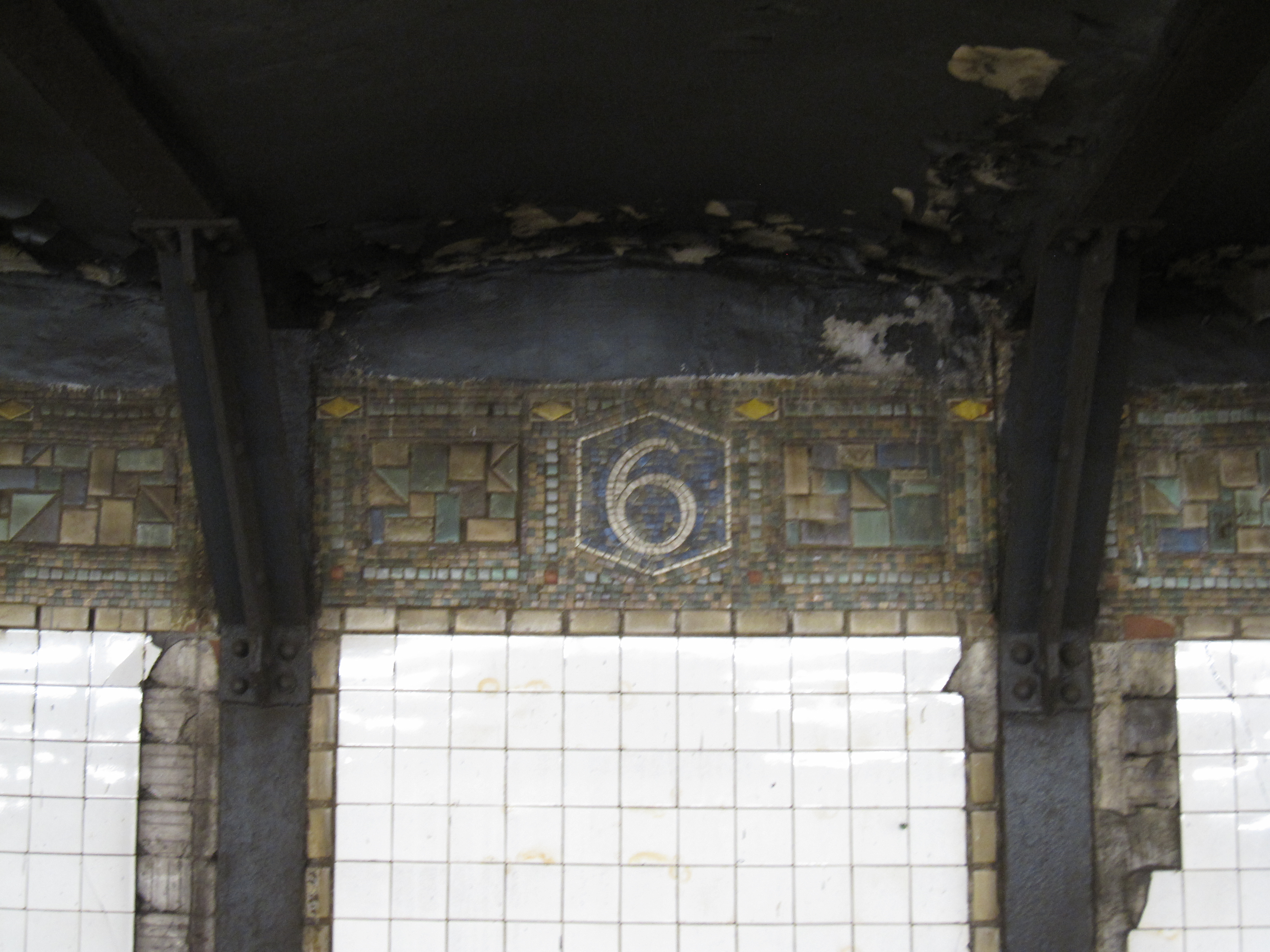
Mosaic tablet on track wall

The station is approximately 40 feet (12 m) below street level. Both track walls have their original mosaic trim line consisting of earthy tones of olive green, brown, ochre and tan augmented by light green and Copenhagen blue. "6" tablets representing "Sixth Avenue" run along the trim line at regular intervals. West of the station, a center lay-up track begins at a bumper block and is only accessible from the Eighth Avenue terminal. This station was the terminal for the BMT Canarsie Line until the Eighth Avenue station opened in 1931.

The 1993 artwork here is called MTA Jewels by Jennifer Kotter. It consists of paintings of various subjects on the passageway leading to the IRT.

=== Exits ===
The station has seven staircases going up from the platform. The two westernmost ones go up to a passageway that leads to the full-time fare control area at the IRT Broadway–Seventh Avenue Line station. The next two go up to the extreme south ends of either platform of the IND Sixth Avenue Line station. The western staircase goes to the southbound platform, and the one directly east of it goes to the northbound platform

The next two staircases go up to a mezzanine leading to fare control that has a powder blue and state blue trim line. A bank of three regular turnstiles and two high entry/exit turnstiles provide entrance/exit from the station and there is no token booth. Two staircases go up to either eastern corners of 14th Street and Sixth Avenue. Another unstaffed bank of turnstiles by the northeast staircase leads to the mezzanine above the Queens-bound platform of 14th Street on the IND.

The last staircase on the extreme east end of the platform leads to a storage area and ventilation room. Another staircase in this section has been removed.

== Image gallery ==
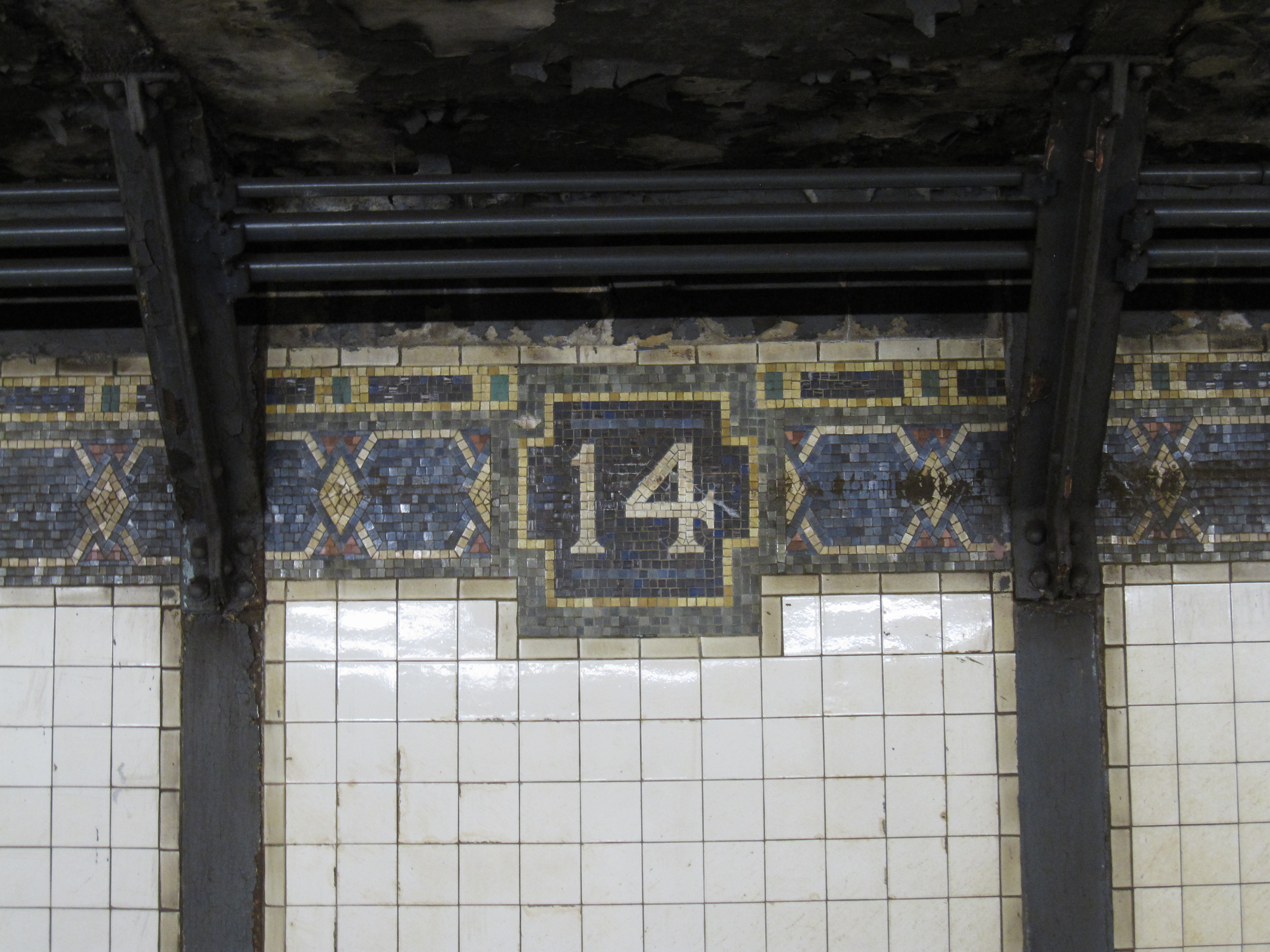
IRT mosaic trim line and frieze with number "14"

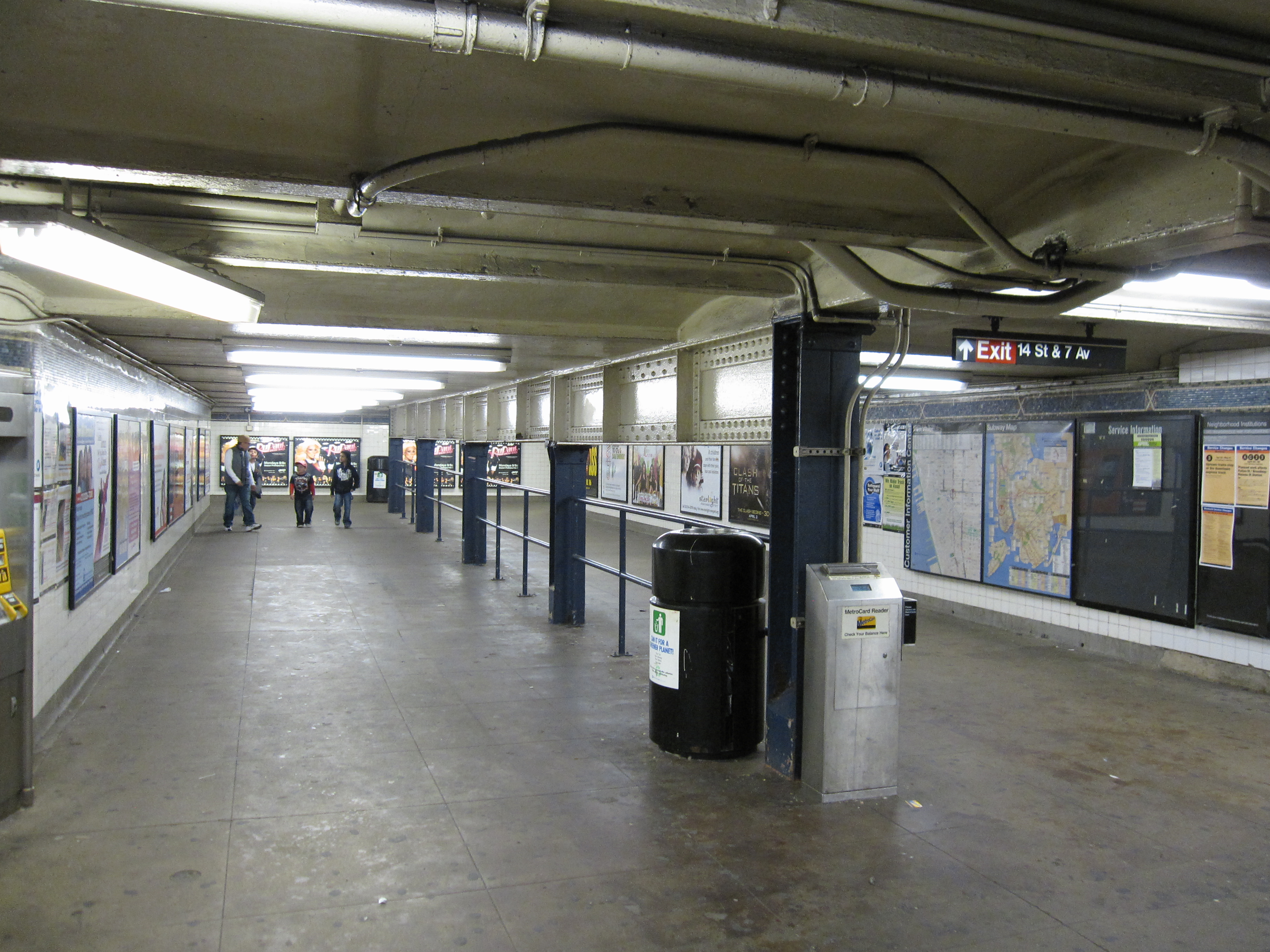
Mezzanine area

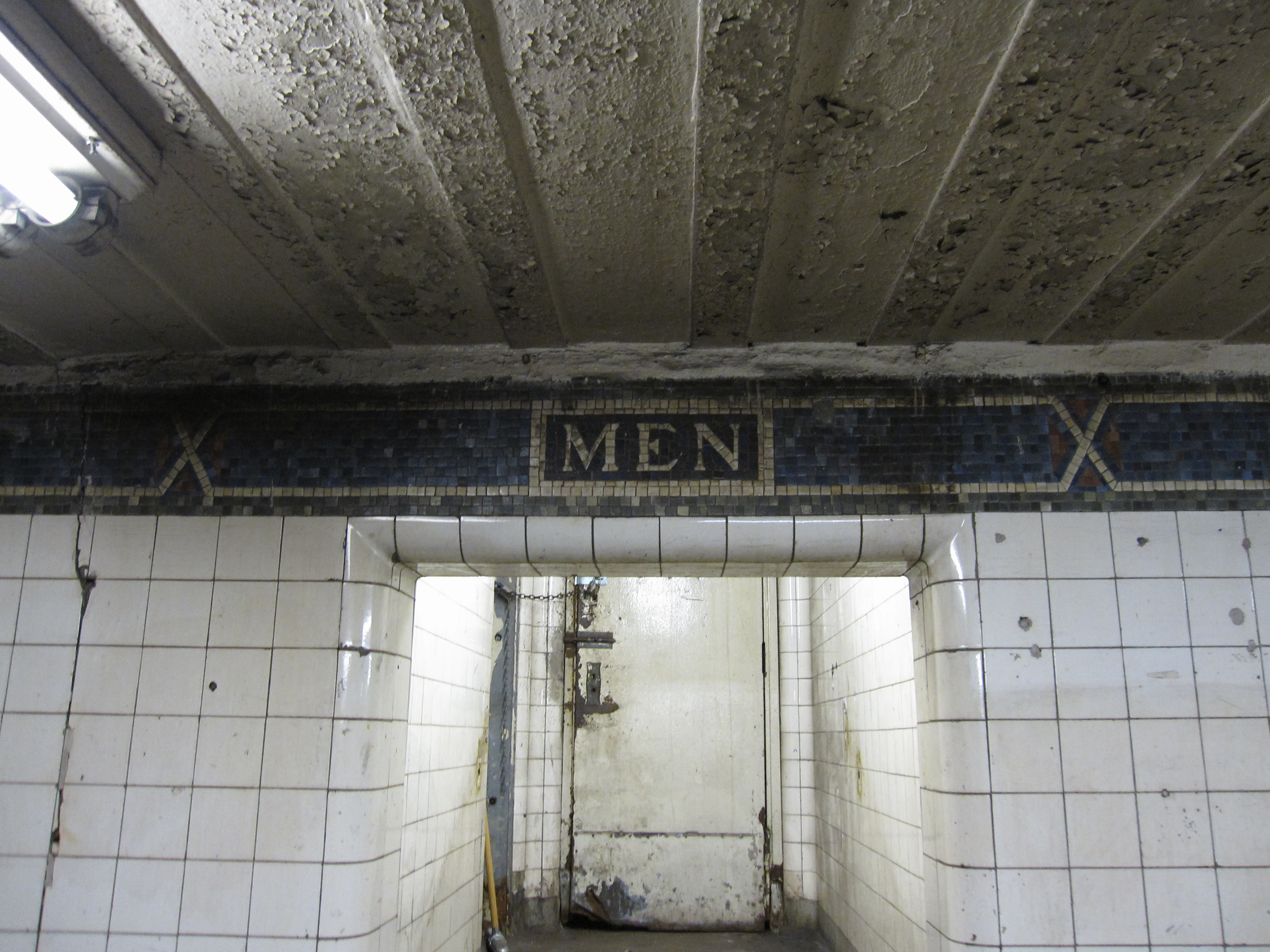
Mosaics above the former men's restroom

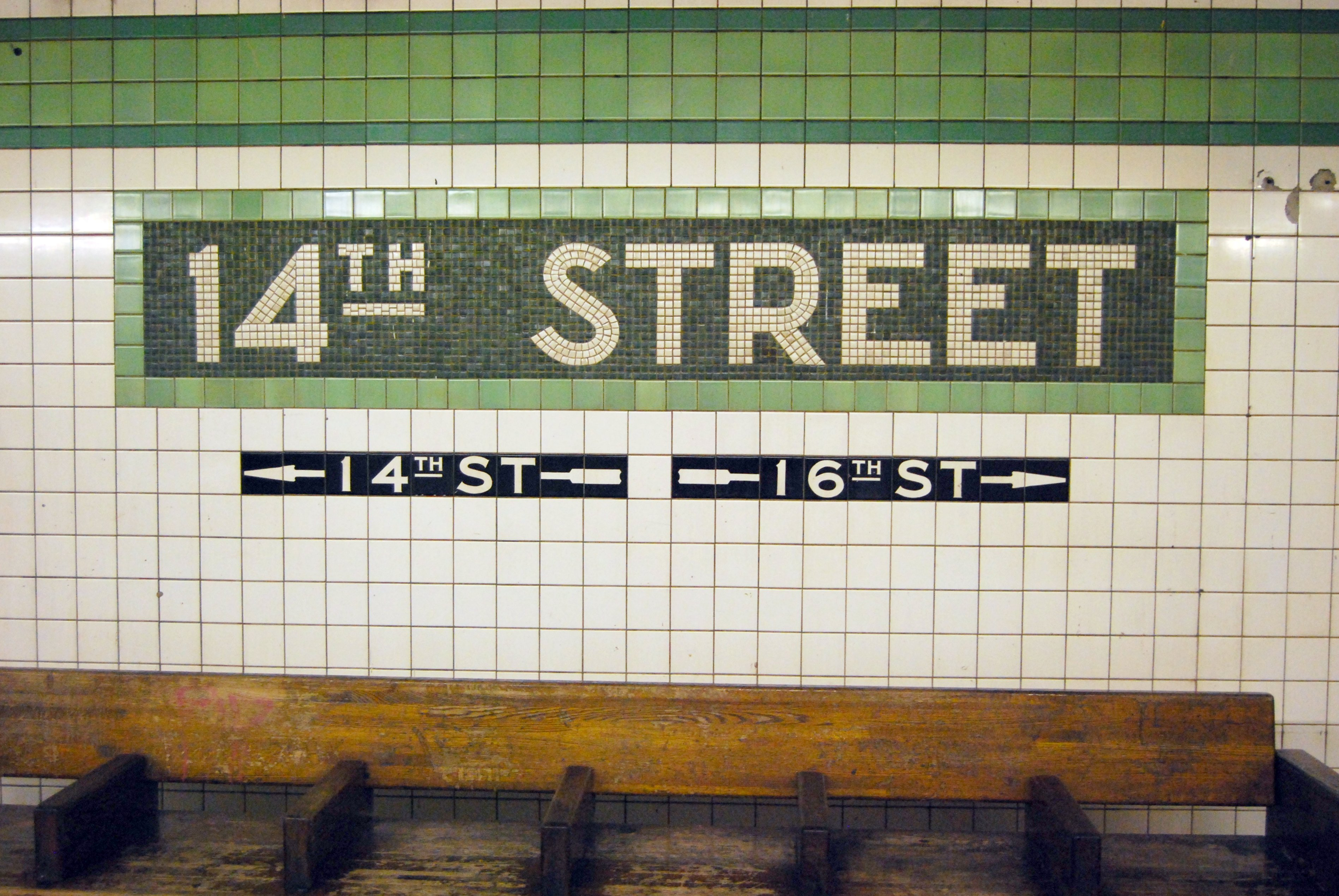
IND trim line, mosaic name tablet, and directional tile captions

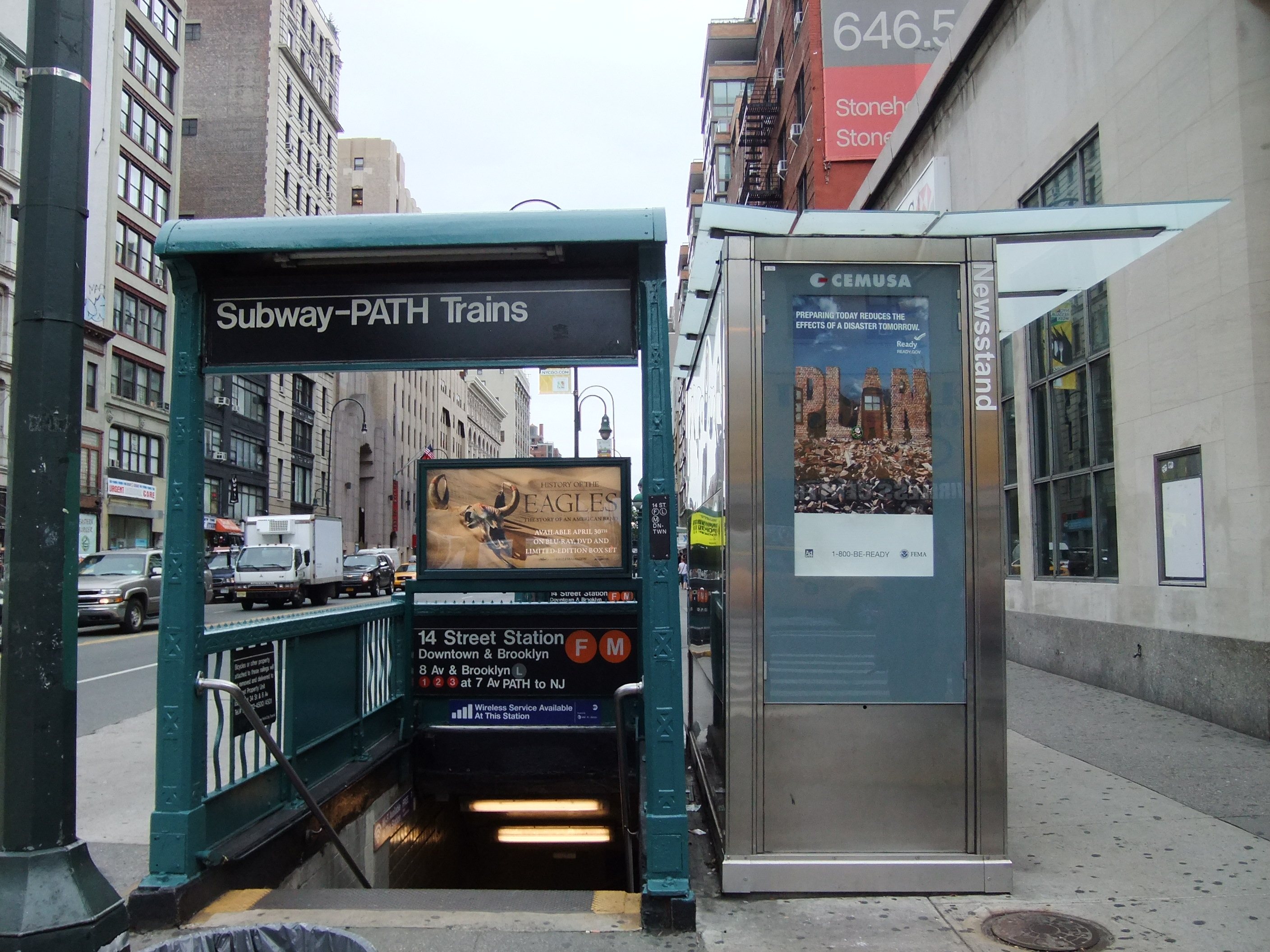
Northwest stair of PATH leading to the station

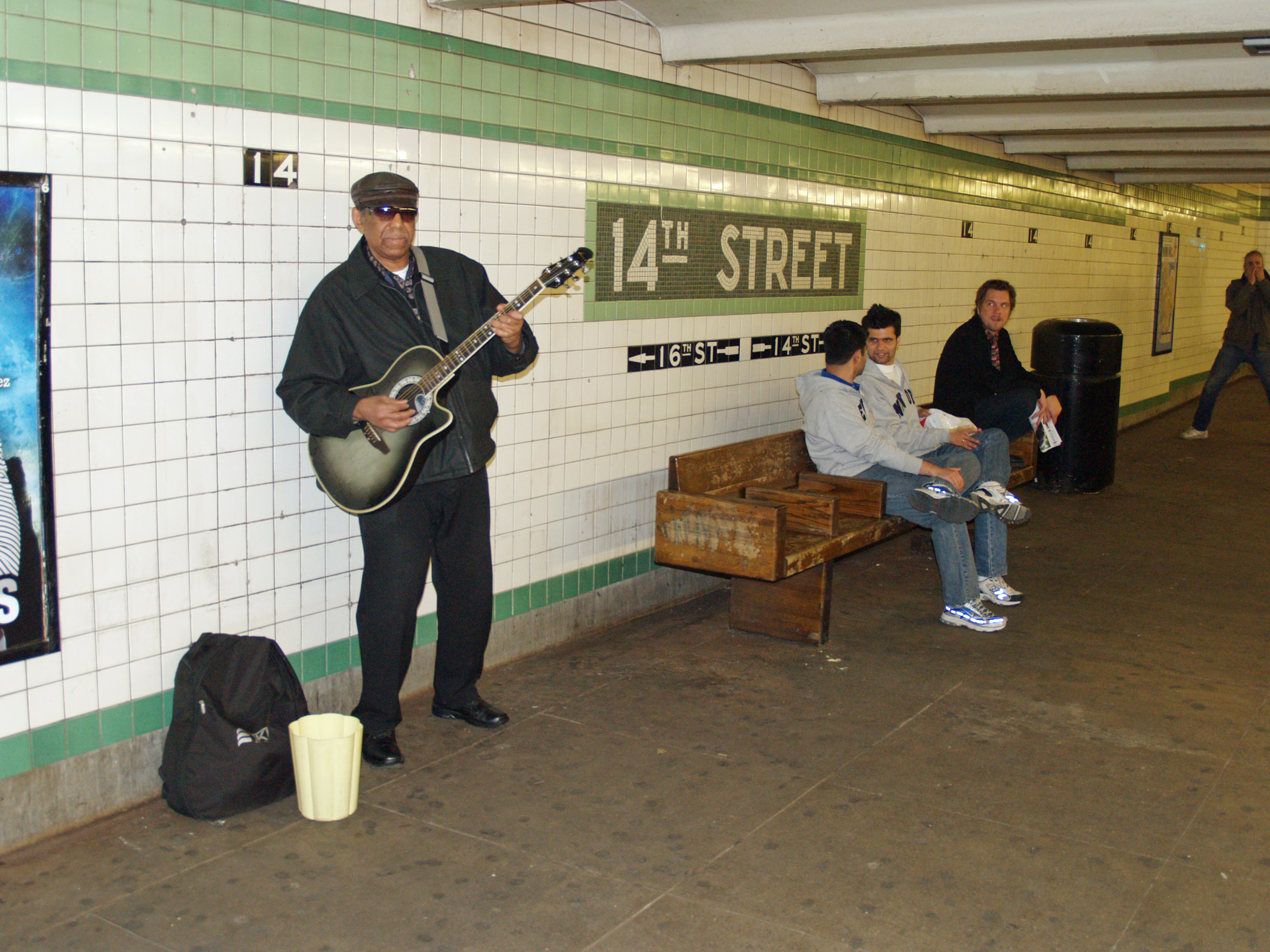
Musician playing on the southbound IND platform
