= Canal Street station (IND Eighth Avenue Line) =

New York City Subway station in Manhattan

Canal Street
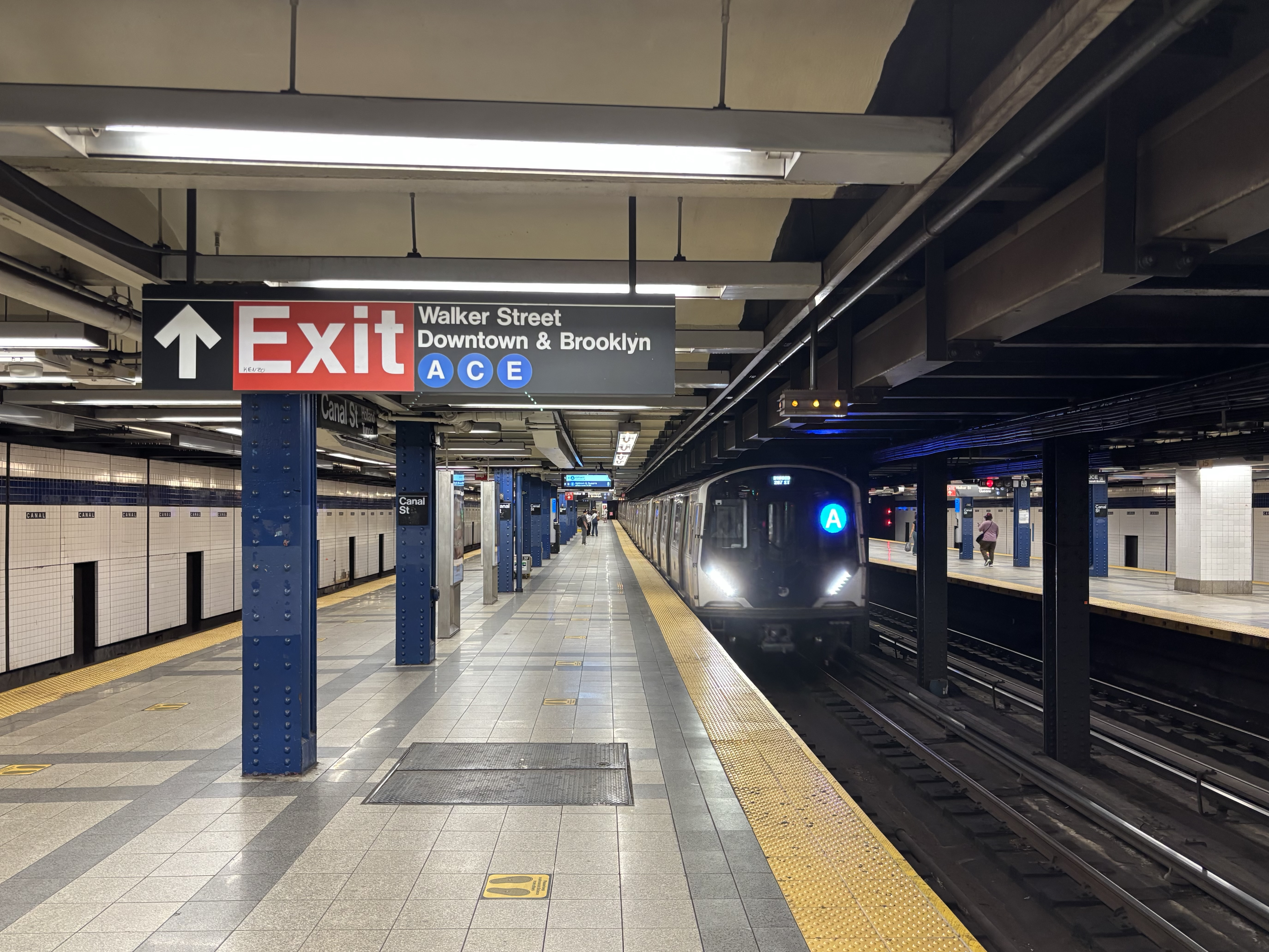
- R211A A train arriving at the northbound platform

Station statistics
- Address: Canal Street & Sixth Avenue; New York, New York
- Borough: Manhattan
- Locale: Tribeca, SoHo, Hudson Square
- Coordinates: 40.72186°N 74.005365°W
- Division: B (IND)
- Line: IND Eighth Avenue Line
- Services: A (all times); C (all except late nights); E (all times)
- Transit: NYCT Bus: M55, X27, X28; MTA Bus: BxM18
- Structure: Underground
- Platforms: 2 island platforms cross-platform interchange
- Tracks: 4

Other information
- Opened: September 10, 1932; 94 years ago
- Accessibility: Cross-platform transfer available

Traffic
- 2025: 4,307,784 ▲4.4%
- Rank: 76 out of 423
Services
Preceding station	New York City Subway	Following station
West Fourth Street–Washington Square A toward Inwood–207th Street	Express	Chambers Street A C via Hoyt–Schermerhorn Streets
Spring Street A C E via 50th Street	C (New York City Subway service)	Chambers Street A C via Hoyt–Schermerhorn Streets
Spring Street A C E via 50th Street	Local	World Trade Center E Terminus
Location
Location within New York City Subway
Location within New York City
Location within New York
Track layout
Street map
Station service legend
Symbol	Description
Stops all times except late nights	Stops all times except late nights
Stops all times	Stops all times
Stops late nights only	Stops late nights only

The Canal Street station (alternatively signed Canal Street–Holland Tunnel) is an express station on the IND Eighth Avenue Line of the New York City Subway. Located at the intersection of Canal Street, Vestry Street, and Sixth Avenue (Avenue of the Americas) in Lower Manhattan, it is served by the A and E trains at all times, and the C train at all times except late nights. There is also a New York City Police Department (NYPD) transit precinct at the station.

== History ==
=== Construction and opening ===
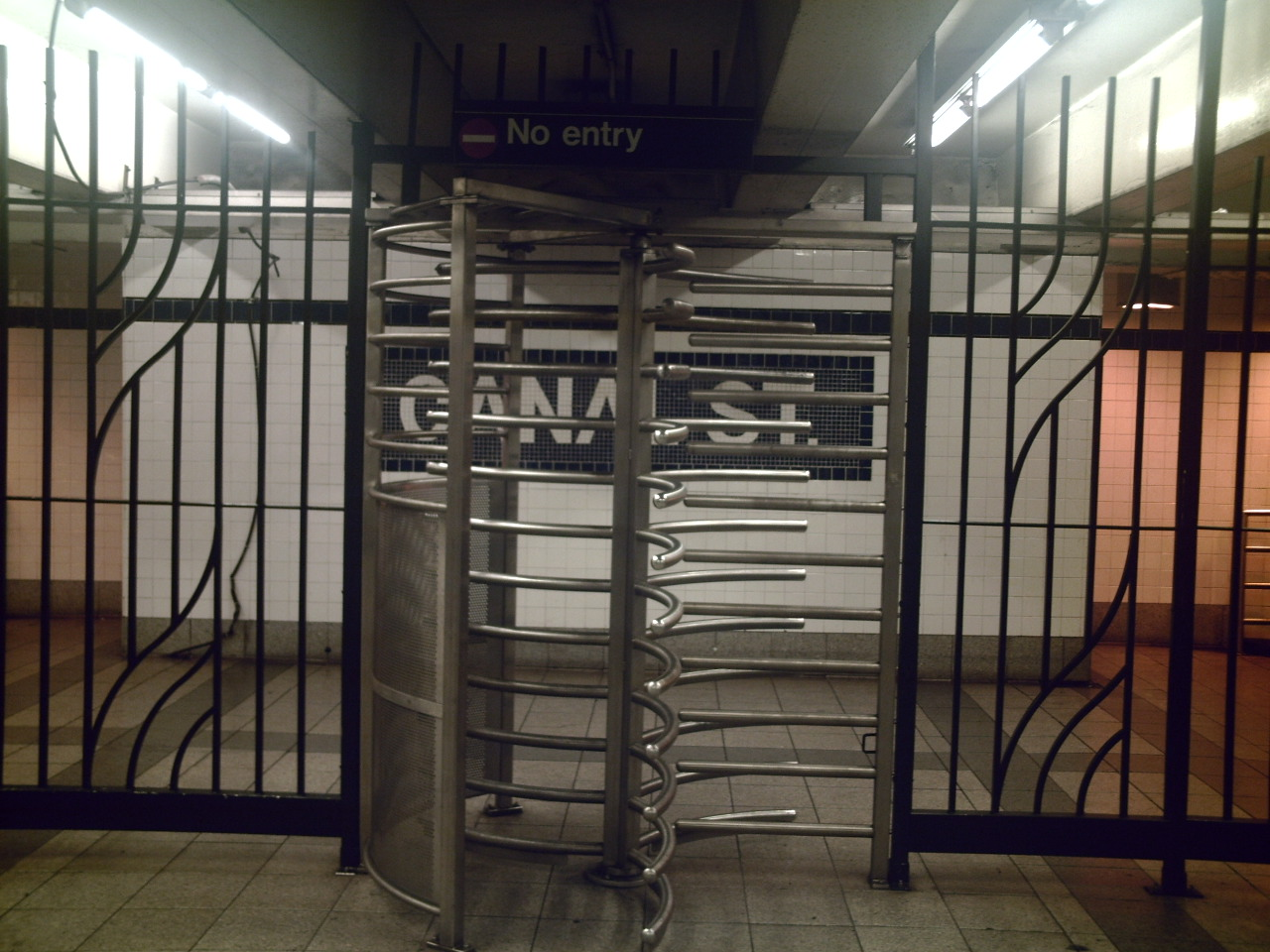
Exit-only turnstile from the southbound platform

New York City mayor John Francis Hylan's original plans for the Independent Subway System (IND), proposed in 1922, included building over 100 miles (160 km) of new lines and taking over nearly 100 miles (160 km) of existing lines. The lines were designed to compete with the existing underground, surface, and elevated lines operated by the Interborough Rapid Transit Company (IRT) and Brooklyn–Manhattan Transit Corporation (BMT). On December 9, 1924, the New York City Board of Transportation (BOT) gave preliminary approval to the construction of a subway line along Eighth Avenue, running from 207th Street. The BOT announced a list of stations on the new line in February 1928, with an express station at Walker Street.

Most of the Eighth Avenue Line was dug using a cheap cut-and-cover method. The Canal Street station was to be one of three Eighth Avenue Line stations underneath Sixth Avenue in Lower Manhattan; the other two stations were to be at Spring Street and West Fourth Street. As part of the construction of the Eighth Avenue Line in Lower Manhattan, Sixth Avenue was extended south to Church Street starting in 1926. This required the demolition of dozens of buildings along the route. By August 1930, the BOT reported that the Eighth Avenue Line was nearly completed, except for the stations between Chambers Street–Hudson Terminal and West Fourth Street (including the Canal Street station), which were only 21 percent completed. The entire line was completed by September 1931, except for the installation of turnstiles.

A preview event for the new subway was hosted on September 8, 1932, two days before the official opening. The Eighth Avenue Line station opened on September 10, 1932, as part of the city-operated IND's initial segment, the Eighth Avenue Line between Chambers Street and 207th Street. When the station opened in 1932, express (A) and local (AA) trains served the line; expresses did not run during late nights or Sundays. When the IND Concourse Line opened on July 1, 1933, the C express train started operating, while all locals became CC trains to the Concourse Line. The E began using the local tracks on August 19, 1933, when the IND Queens Boulevard Line opened. One real-estate expert said the station's construction had encouraged the construction of large developments around the entrance to the Holland Tunnel, such as the Holland Tunnel Plaza Building.

=== Later modifications ===
As part of a pilot program, the New York City Board of Transportation (BOT) installed three-dimensional advertisements at the Canal Street station in late 1948. The BOT announced plans in November 1949 to spend $325,000 extending platforms at several IND stations, including Canal Street, to accommodate 11-car, 660-foot (200 m) trains. The lengthened trains began running during rush hour on September 8, 1953, with eleven-car trains operating on weekdays. The project cost $400,000 and increased the total carrying capacity of rush-hour trains by 4,000 passengers. The operation of eleven-car trains ended in 1958 because of operational difficulties. The signal blocks, especially in Manhattan, were too short to accommodate the longer trains, and the motormen had a very small margin of error to properly align the train with the platform. It was found that operating ten-car trains allowed for two additional trains per hour to be scheduled.

On February 17, 1953, the BOT installed two devices at either end of the station to alert police or passers-by above of emergencies in the station. The devices, which cost $1,100, were called "Call-a-Cop." In the station agent booth, an agent could set off an alarm bell and turn on a red warning light aboveground at Canal and Walker Streets on Sixth Avenue by lightly pushing on a treadle. The warning lights were placed atop eight-feet tall metal poles located at subway entrances. This device would have been installed at other stations if the pilot at this station was successful.

== Station layout ==
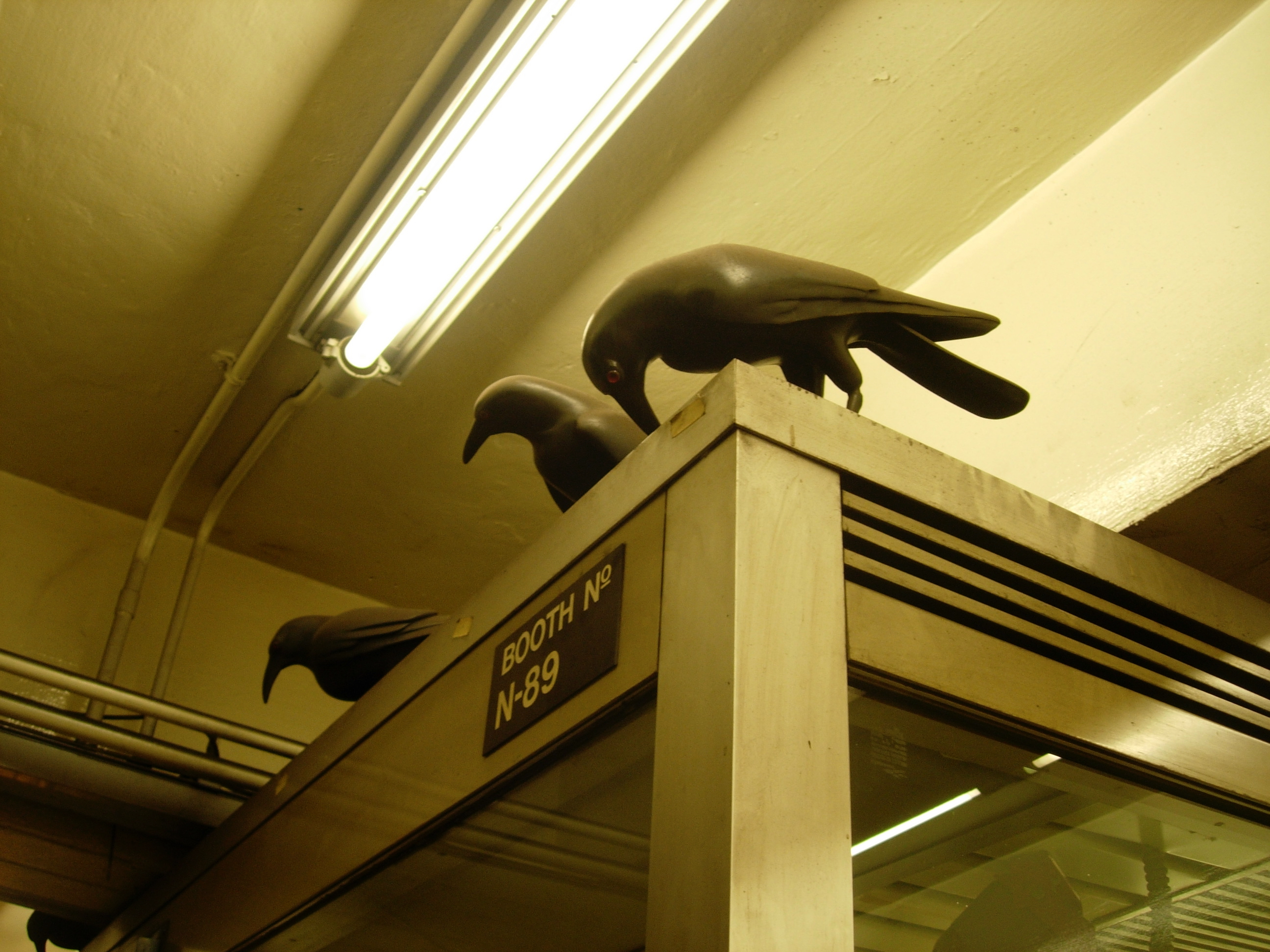
Detail of "A Gathering" sculpture on mezzanine

The Canal Street station is an underground express station that has four tracks and two island platforms, which are each approximately 660 feet (200 m) long. The A and E stop here at all times, while the C only stops here during the day. The A runs express during the day and local at night, while the C and E always run local. The next stop to the north is Spring Street for local trains and West Fourth Street–Washington Square for express trains. The next stop to the south is Chambers Street for A and C trains via the express tracks and World Trade Center for E trains via the local tracks. At either end of the station is a diamond crossover between each local and express tracks. Northbound C and nighttime A trains cross from the express track to the local track past the north end of the platforms and southbound C and nighttime A trains cross from the local track to the express track past the south end of the platforms. The platforms are offset, and a signal tower is located at the south end of the southbound platform.

The walls of the station contain cobalt blue tile bands with darker blue borders. Since Canal Street is an express station, it has a wider tile band than local stations. The tile colors are intended to help riders identify their station more easily, part of a color-coded tile system for the entire Independent Subway System. The tile colors were designed to facilitate navigation for travelers going away from Lower Manhattan; on the Eighth Avenue Line, the tiles change color at the next express station to the north. As such, the blue tiles used at the Canal Street station were also used on Spring Street, the local station to the north; the next express station, West Fourth Street, used a different tile color.

The station contains the headquarters of the New York City Police Department (NYPD)'s Transit District 2.

=== Track layout ===
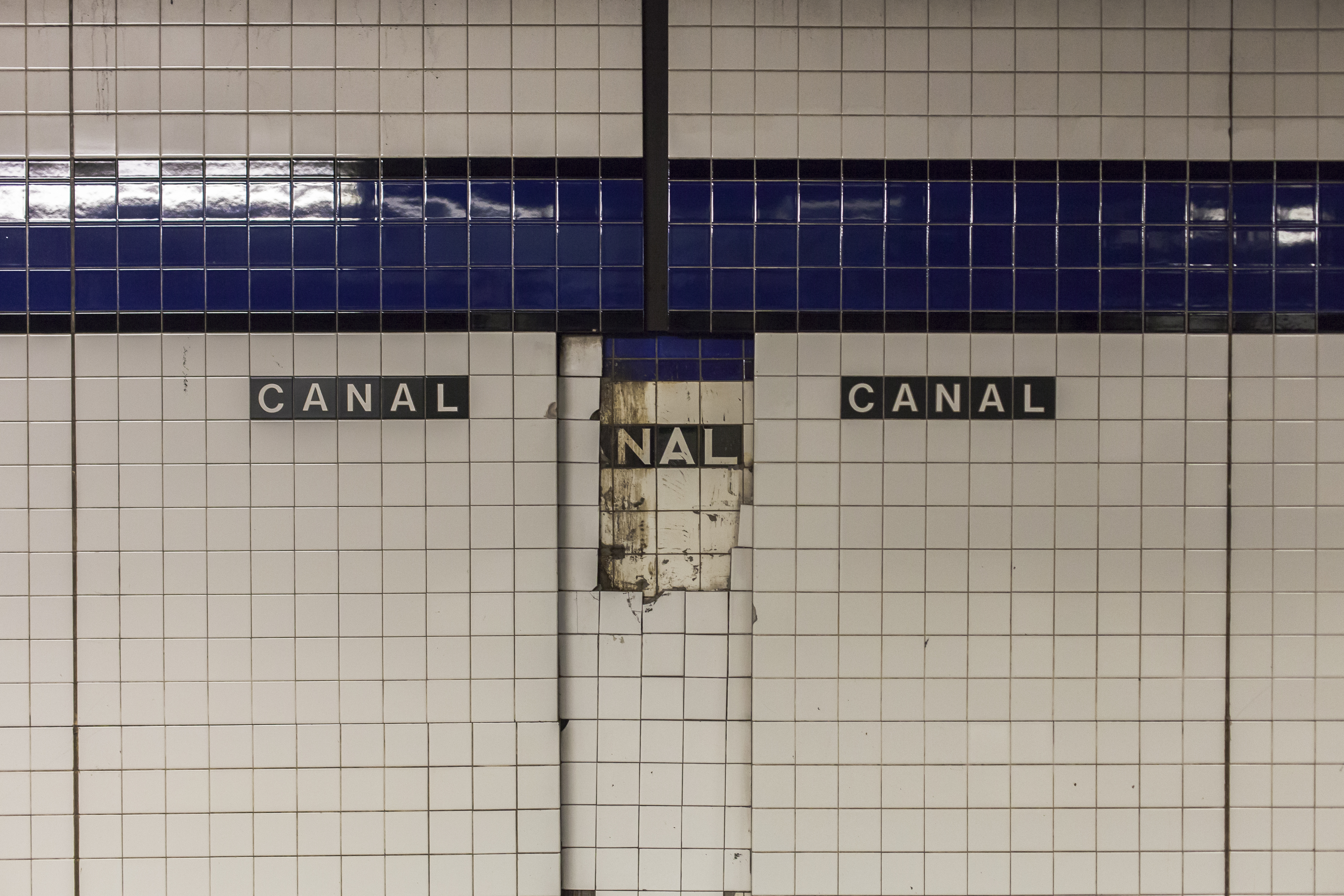
A section of the platform wall showing three layers of tile, including the original IND tilework

South of this station, the tracks split into two levels and cross at a flying junction. These were intended to allow for the construction of a future junction with a proposed line under Worth Street as part of the IND Second System. The proposed route would have run under Worth Street and East Broadway, and crossed the East River to Brooklyn. The bellmouths for this proposed route are visible from the E train headed towards and coming from the World Trade Center station. On the tunnel wall where the turnout is, there is an arrow painted with the words reading: "Worth St." written next to it.

=== Exits ===
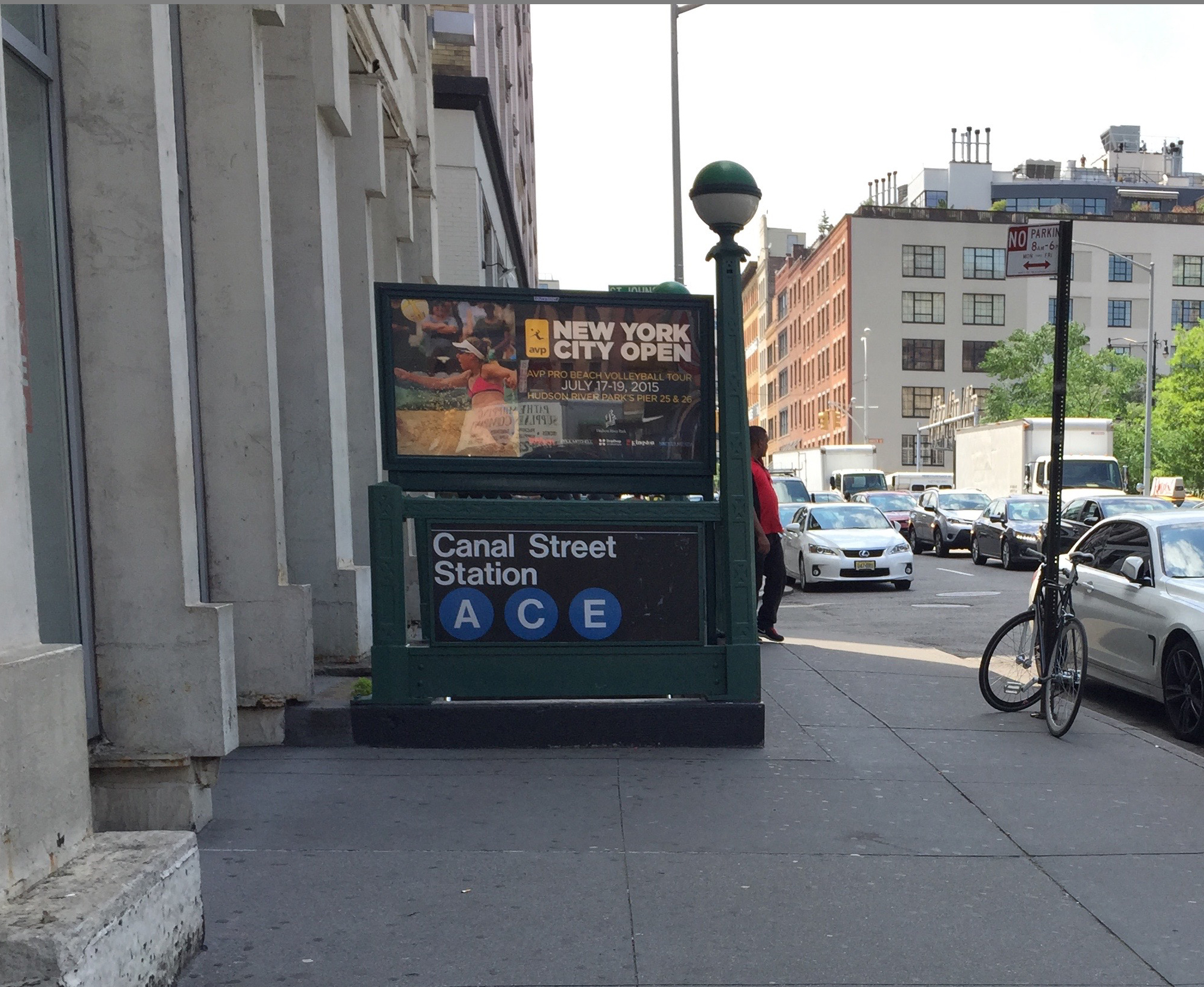
Laight Street stairs

The station contains six open exits. Only one exit is located at the station's namesake – Canal Street – at the northeast corner of Sixth Avenue and Canal Street. The other exit leading from the northern section of the station leads to the south side of Laight Street, between Sixth Avenue and St. Johns Lane. At the center of the station, there are exits to the northwest and northeast corners of Sixth Avenue and West Broadway at Lispenard Street. At the southern end of the station, there are two exits. One exit leads to the northeast corner of Walker Street and Sixth Avenue, while the other leads to the AT&T Building.

The station also has three closed exits. One exit, located at the southern end of the station, led to the southeast corner of Walker Street and West Broadway. The other two are located in a passageway that extends further north than the current northernmost open exit; one led to the southeast corner of Grand Street and Sixth Avenue; the other led to Grand Street and Sullivan Street on the west side of Juan Pablo Duarte Square. The passageway currently houses employee facilities.

== Nearby points of interest ==
The station is located on the street of the same name, which is the boundary of SoHo and Tribeca. The station sits one block west from the entrance to the Holland Tunnel outside of the Tribeca North Historic District. Much of the surrounding area is characterized by its historic loft architecture.

Several public parks are located near the station. Above the north end of the station at Canal Street and 6th Avenue are Albert Capsouto Park, Duarte Square, and Grand Canal Court. At the south end of the station at Walker Street is Tribeca Park. Several blocks to the west at the end of Canal Street are Canal Park and Hudson River Park. St. John's Park formerly existed two blocks west of the station; the site is now occupied by Holland Tunnel exit ramps.
