= Spring Street station (IND Eighth Avenue Line) =

New York City Subway station in Manhattan

Spring Street
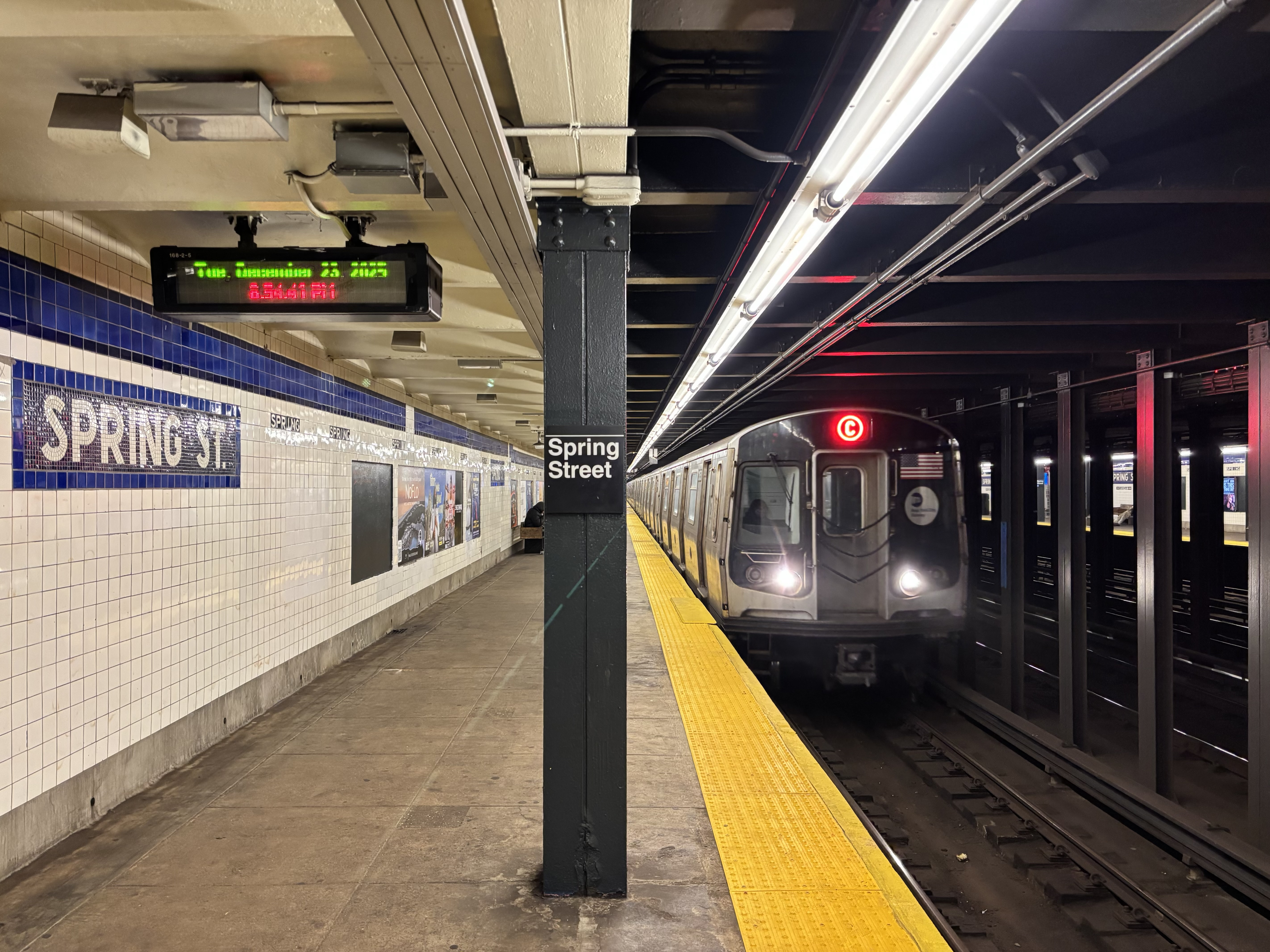
- R179 C train arriving at the northbound platform

Station statistics
- Address: Spring Street & Sixth Avenue; New York, New York
- Borough: Manhattan
- Locale: Hudson Square, SoHo
- Coordinates: 40.725503°N 74.004035°W
- Division: B (IND)
- Line: IND Eighth Avenue Line
- Services: A (late nights); C (all except late nights); E (all times)
- Transit: NYCT Bus: M21, M55, X27, X28
- Structure: Underground
- Platforms: 2 side platforms
- Tracks: 4

Other information
- Opened: September 10, 1932; 94 years ago
- Accessible: Partially; full access planned (southbound platform accessible via elevator)

Traffic
- 2025: 3,762,004 ▲15.7%
- Rank: 96 out of 423
Services
Preceding station	New York City Subway	Following station
West Fourth Street–Washington Square A C E via 50th Street	Local	Canal Street A C E services split
Location
Location within New York City Subway
Location within New York City
Location within New York
Track layout
Street map
Station service legend
Symbol	Description
Stops all times except late nights	Stops all times except late nights
Stops all times	Stops all times
Stops late nights only	Stops late nights only

The Spring Street station is a local station on the IND Eighth Avenue Line of the New York City Subway. Located at Spring Street and Sixth Avenue (Avenue of the Americas) in the Hudson Square and SoHo neighborhoods of lower Manhattan, it is served by the E train at all times, and by the C train at all times except late nights, when the A train takes over service.

== History ==
=== Construction and opening ===
New York City mayor John Francis Hylan's original plans for the Independent Subway System (IND), proposed in 1922, included building over 100 miles (160 km) of new lines and taking over nearly 100 miles (160 km) of existing lines. The lines were designed to compete with the existing underground, surface, and elevated lines operated by the Interborough Rapid Transit Company (IRT) and Brooklyn–Manhattan Transit Corporation (BMT). On December 9, 1924, the New York City Board of Transportation (BOT) gave preliminary approval for the construction of the IND Eighth Avenue Line. This line consisted of a corridor connecting Inwood, Manhattan, to Downtown Brooklyn, running largely under Eighth Avenue but also paralleling Greenwich Avenue and Sixth Avenue in Lower Manhattan. The BOT announced a list of stations on the new line in February 1928, with a local station at Spring Street and Sixth Avenue.

Most of the Eighth Avenue Line was dug using a cheap cut-and-cover method. The Spring Street station was to be one of three Eighth Avenue Line stations underneath Sixth Avenue in Lower Manhattan; the other two stations were to be at Canal Street and West Fourth Street. As part of the construction of the Eighth Avenue Line in Lower Manhattan, Sixth Avenue was extended south to Church Street starting in 1926. This required the demolition of dozens of buildings along the route. By August 1930, the BOT reported that the Eighth Avenue Line was nearly completed, except for the stations between Chambers Street–Hudson Terminal and West Fourth Street (including the Spring Street station), which were only 21 percent completed. The entire line was completed by September 1931, except for the installation of turnstiles.

A preview event for the new subway was hosted on September 8, 1932, two days before the official opening. The Spring Street station opened on September 10, 1932, as part of the city-operated IND's initial segment, the Eighth Avenue Line between Chambers Street and 207th Street. When the station opened in 1932, it was served by local AA trains. When the IND Concourse Line opened on July 1, 1933, all locals became CC trains to the Concourse Line. The E began using the local tracks on August 19, 1933, when the IND Queens Boulevard Line opened.

=== Later years ===
The New York City Board of Transportation announced plans in November 1949 to spend $325,000 extending platforms at several IND stations, including Canal Street, to accommodate 11-car, 660-foot (200 m) trains. The lengthened trains began running during rush hour on September 8, 1953, with eleven-car trains operating on weekdays. The project cost $400,000 and increased the total carrying capacity of rush-hour trains by 4,000 passengers. The operation of eleven-car trains ended in 1958 because of operational difficulties. The signal blocks, especially in Manhattan, were too short to accommodate the longer trains, and the motormen had a very small margin of error to properly align the train with the platform. It was found that operating ten-car trains allowed for two additional trains per hour to be scheduled.

The station was renovated as part of the 2010–2014 MTA Capital Program. An MTA study conducted in 2014 found that 31% of station components were out of date.

As part of a rezoning of 550 Washington Street, it was proposed to make the downtown platform of the station wheelchair-accessible in compliance with the Americans with Disabilities Act of 1990, as well as add a new street stair at the southwest corner of Spring Street and Sixth Avenue. Construction began around June 2024. The elevator on the downtown platform opened in December 2025. Along with the elevator, a new street stair to the southwestern corner of Spring Street and Sixth Avenue was opened.

As part of its 2025–2029 Capital Program, the MTA has proposed making the station fully wheelchair-accessible in compliance with the Americans with Disabilities Act of 1990. In October 2026, the MTA announced plans to install taller fare gates with glass panels at 20 additional stations, including the Spring Street station, following a successful pilot program at earlier stations.

== Station layout ==
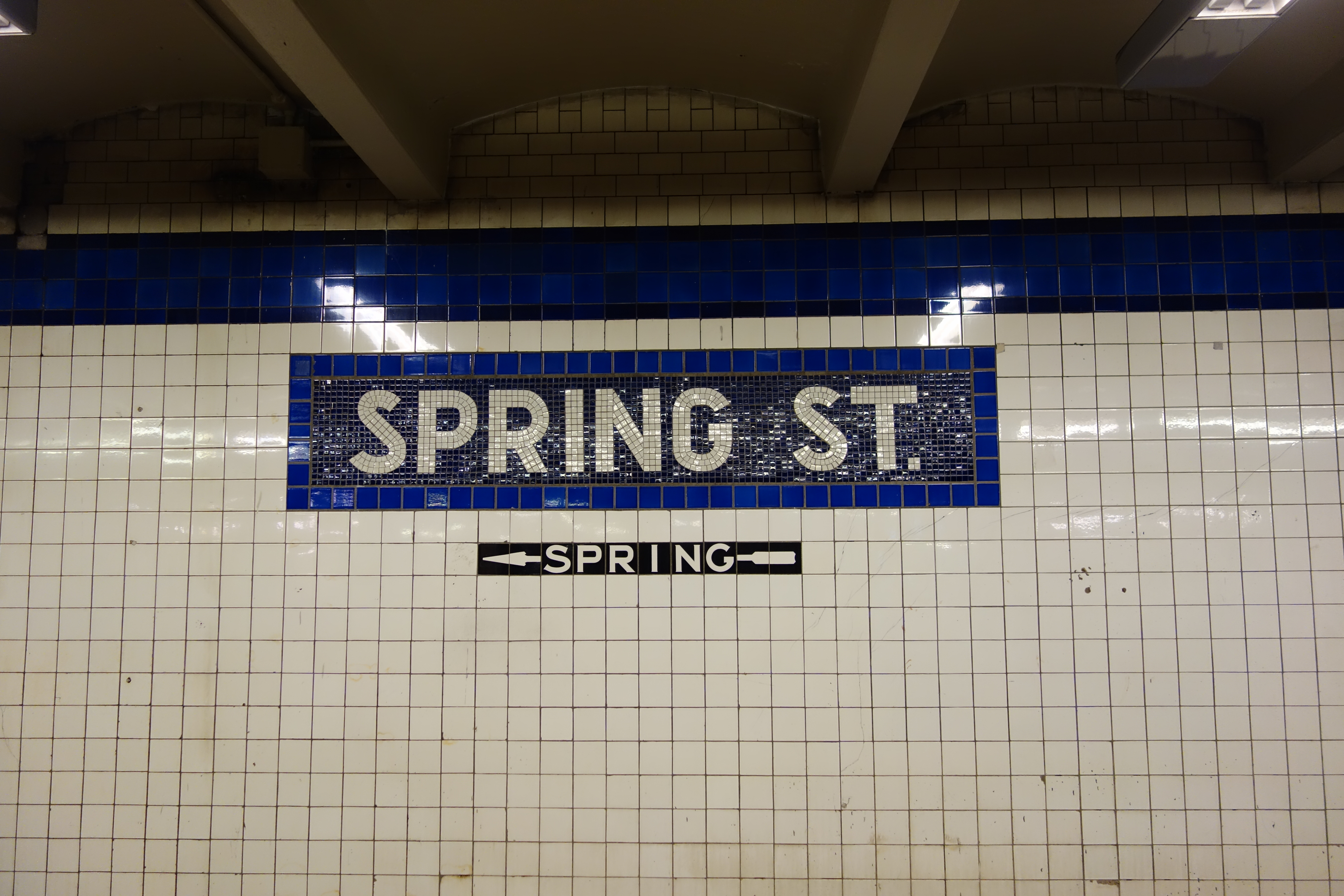
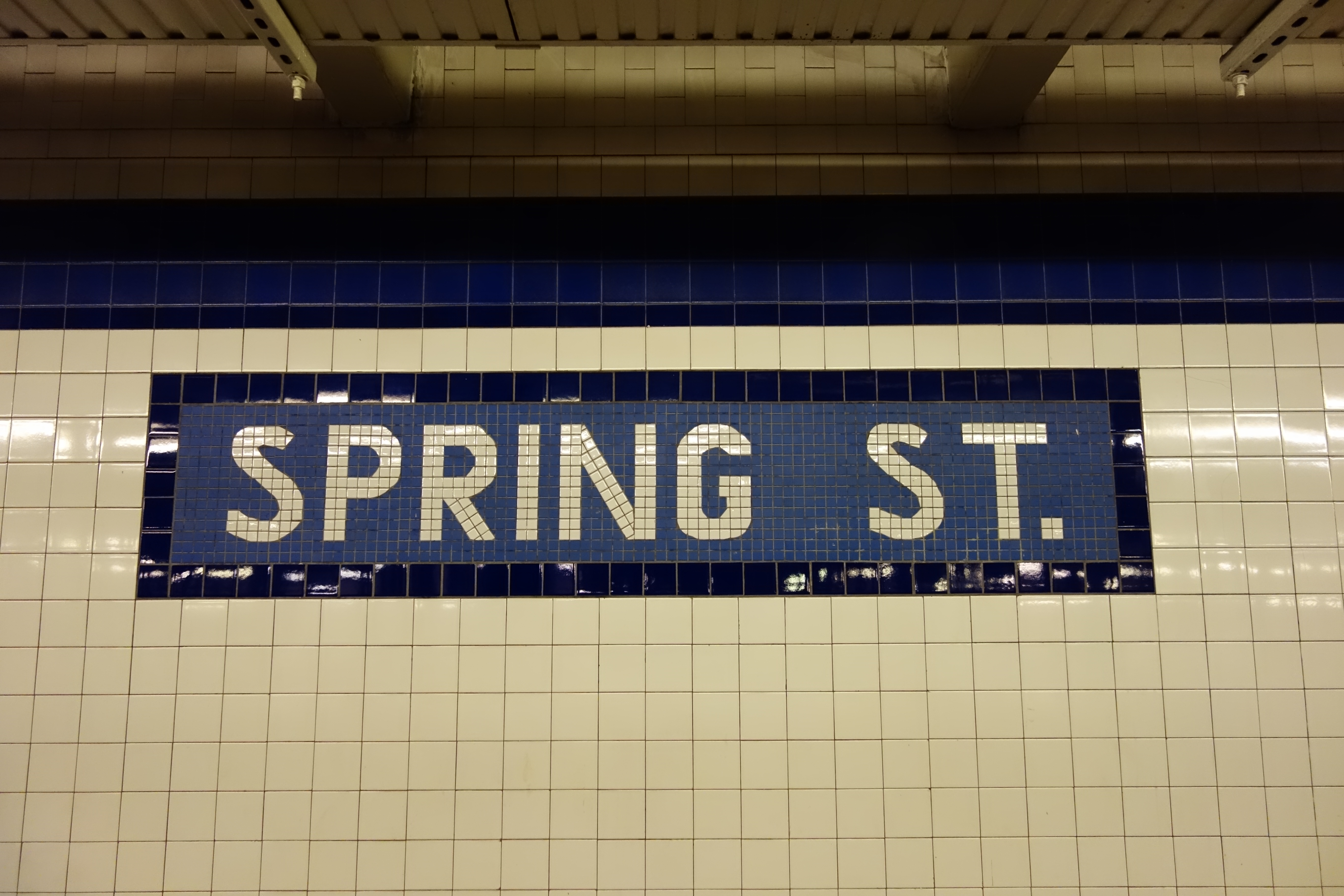
An original IND mosaic (left) at the south end of the station, and a modern mosaic (right) at the north end covering an exit to Prince Street

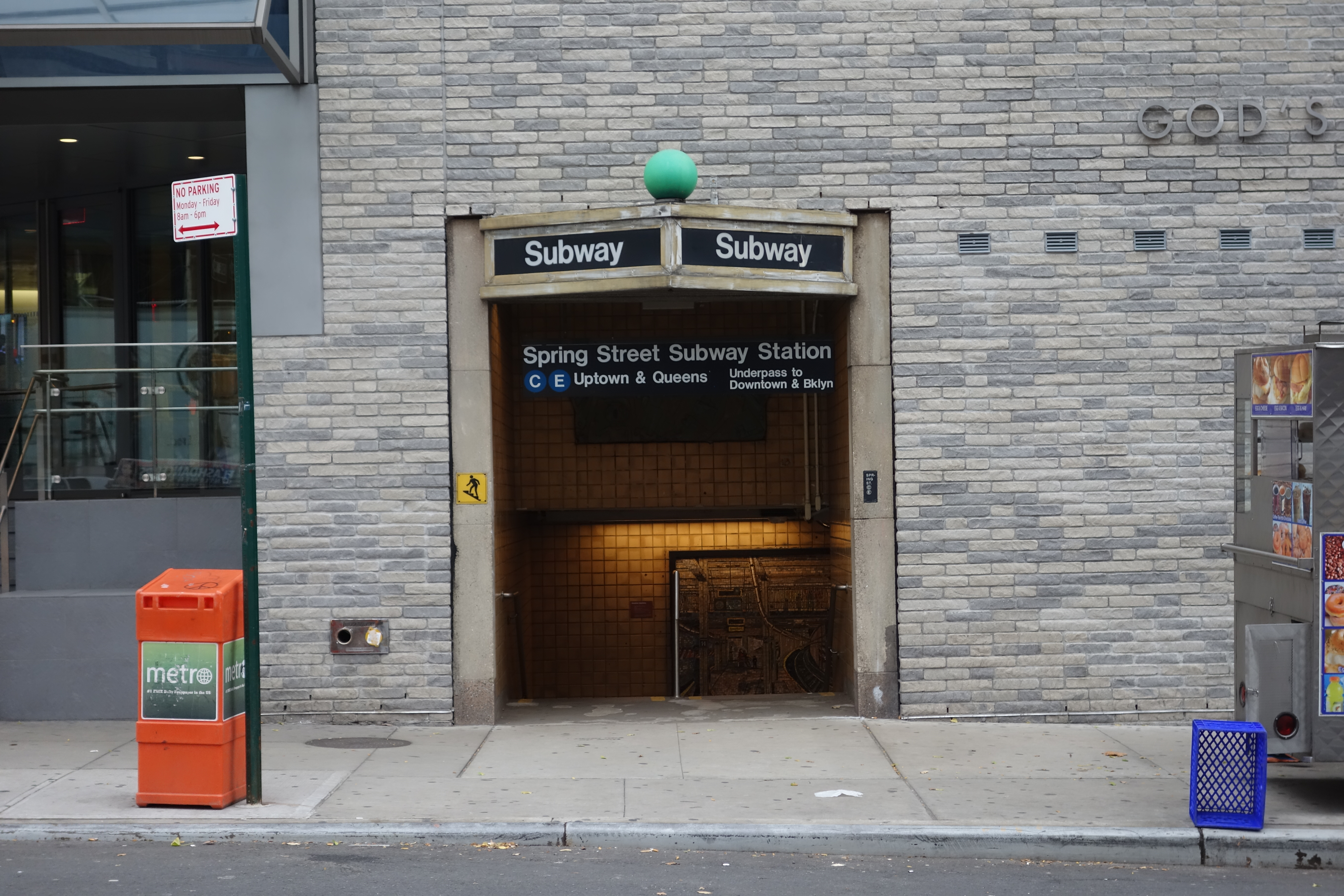
Northbound entrance

Like most local subway stations, Spring Street has two side platforms and four tracks. The two center express tracks are used by the A train during daytime hours. A crossunder just within fare control allows a free transfer between directions.

Wall tiling suggests that fare controls and a crossunder have been removed from the north end of the station. The platforms have a blue trim line on a dark blue border (ultramarine blue and cobalt blue, with replacement tiles at the north end that are ultramarine blue and navy blue). The name tablets consist of "SPRING ST" in white sans-serif font on a dark blue background with a lighter blue border. Beneath the trim line and name tablets are "SPRING" and directional signs in white lettering on a black border tiled onto the walls. Blue I-beam columns run along the entire length of both platforms, with every other one having the standard black and white station signs.

=== Exits ===
All fare control areas are at platform level. The station's main ones are at the south end of the platform. Each contains banks of regular and HEET turnstiles, a token booth, and staircases going up to Spring Street and Sixth Avenue. The single one on the northbound side is built inside the headquarters for God's Love We Deliver and leads to the northeast corner, while the two on the southbound side lead to either western corner. The southbound platform has an un-staffed HEET entrance that has a single staircase going up to the southwest corner of Vandam Street and Sixth Avenue. There are also closed fare control areas at the north end of the station that led to all four corners of the intersection of Prince Street/Charlton Street and Sixth Avenue.

== Artwork ==
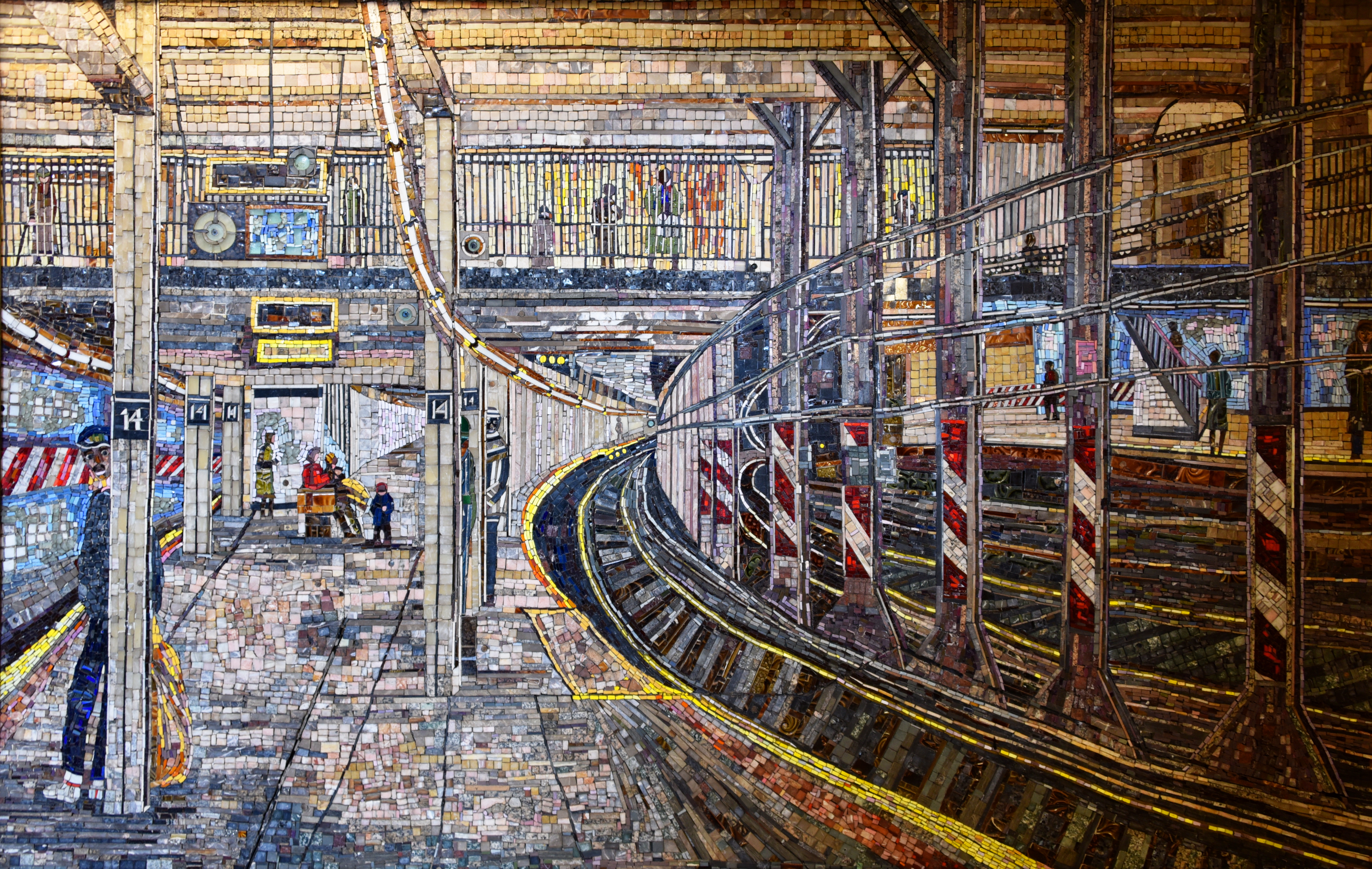
Mosaic depicting the 14th Street–Union Square station's platform at the entrance to Spring Street station

In December 1984, Chilean artist Alfredo Jaar rented all the ad space in the station for the month, and put up an installation he called "Rushes", which showed 81 photos he had taken of poor Brazilian workers digging in Serra Pelada, a government-run gold mine. Scattered amongst them were signs giving world oil prices.

The 1994 artwork installed at the stairway of the northbound platform's fare control is a large, lively mosaic called New York City Subway Station by Edith Kramer. It consists of a single painting depicting 14th Street–Union Square on the IRT Lexington Avenue Line.
