= West Fourth Street–Washington Square station =

New York City Subway station in Manhattan

West 4 Street– Washington Square
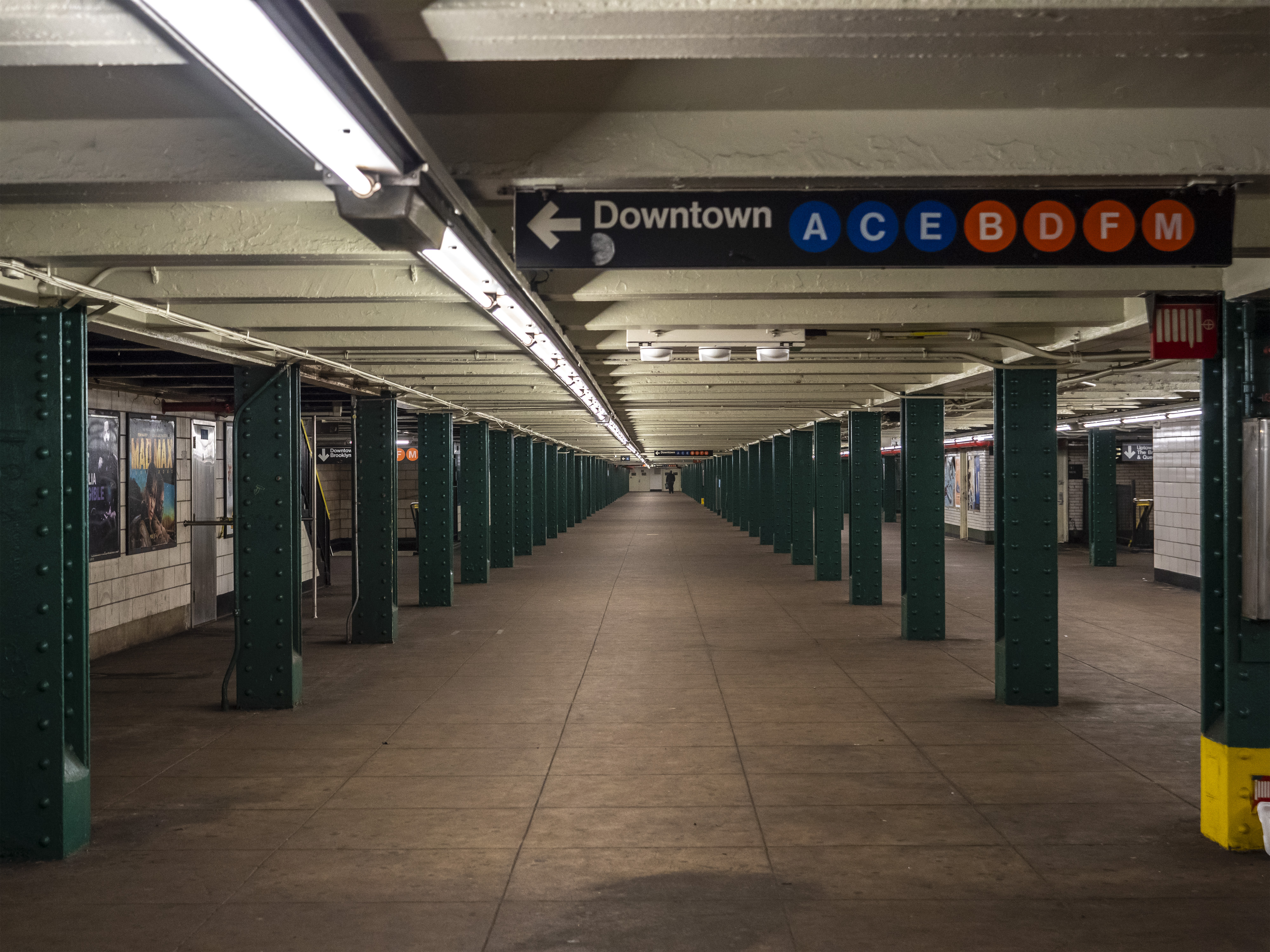
- The station's mezzanine

Station statistics
- Address: West Third Street & Sixth Avenue; New York, New York (main station entrance)
- Borough: Manhattan
- Locale: Greenwich Village
- Coordinates: 40.731682°N 74.000945°W
- Division: B (IND)
- Line: IND Sixth Avenue Line; IND Eighth Avenue Line
- Services: A (all times); B (weekdays during the day); C (all times except late nights); D (all times); E (all times); F (all times) <F> (two rush hour trains, peak direction); M (weekdays during the day)
- Transit: NYCT Bus: M8, M55, X27, X28, SIM7, SIM33; PATH: JSQ–33, HOB–33, JSQ–33 (via HOB) (at Ninth Street)
- Structure: Underground
- Levels: 2
- Platforms: 4 island platforms (2 on each level) cross-platform interchange
- Tracks: 8 (4 on each level)

Other information
- Opened: September 10, 1932; 94 years ago (upper level); December 15, 1940; 85 years ago (lower level)
- Accessible: Yes

Traffic
- 2025: 11,912,274 ▲10.4%
- Rank: 17 out of 423
Services
| Preceding station | New York City Subway | Following station |
|---|---|---|
| 14th Street A C E northbound | Express | Canal Street A toward Far Rockaway–Mott Avenue or Ozone Park–Lefferts Boulevard |
| 14th Street A C E northbound | Local | Spring Street A C E via Canal Street |
| 34th Street–Herald Square B D via 59th Street–Columbus Circle | Express | Broadway–Lafayette Street B D F <F> M southbound |
| 14th Street F <F> M via 47th–50th Streets–Rockefeller Center | Local | Broadway–Lafayette Street B D F <F> M southbound |
Former services
| Preceding station | New York City Subway | Following station |
|---|---|---|
| 34th Street–Herald Square toward 21st Street–Queensbridge | JFK Express | Chambers Street toward Howard Beach–JFK Airport |
Location
Location within New York City Subway
Location within New York City
Location within New York
Track layout
Upper level (Eighth Avenue Line)
Lower level (Sixth Avenue Line)
Street map
Station service legend
| Symbol | Description |
| Stops all times except late nights | Stops all times except late nights |
| Stops all times | Stops all times |
| Stops late nights only | Stops late nights only |
| Stops weekdays during the day | Stops weekdays during the day |
| Stops rush hours in the peak direction only (limited service) | Stops rush hours in the peak direction only (limited service) |
- West 4th Street Subway Station (IND)
- U.S. National Register of Historic Places
- New York State Register of Historic Places
- MPS: New York City Subway System MPS
- NRHP reference No.: 05000223
- NYSRHP No.: 06101.015035

Significant dates
- Added to NRHP: March 30, 2005
- Designated NYSRHP: December 18, 2004

The West Fourth Street–Washington Square station (also known as the West Fourth Street station) is an express station and transfer stop on the IND Sixth Avenue and IND Eighth Avenue Lines of the New York City Subway, located at the intersection of West Fourth Street and Sixth Avenue (Avenue of the Americas) in Greenwich Village, Manhattan. It is served by the A, D, E, and F trains at all times; the B and M trains on weekdays; the C train at all times except late nights; and the <F> train during rush hours in the peak direction.

The West Fourth Street station was built as an express station for the Independent Subway System (IND)'s Sixth Avenue and Eighth Avenue Lines. It has four island platforms and eight tracks, split evenly across two levels, which are connected by a mezzanine. The Eighth Avenue Line platforms on the upper level opened on September 10, 1932, as part of the IND's first segment, while the Sixth Avenue Line platforms on the lower level opened on December 15, 1940. The West Fourth Street station contains elevators, which make it compliant with the Americans with Disabilities Act of 1990. The station is listed on the National Register of Historic Places.

== History ==
=== Construction and opening ===
New York City mayor John Francis Hylan's original plans for the Independent Subway System (IND), proposed in 1922, included building over 100 miles (160 km) of new lines and taking over nearly 100 miles (160 km) of existing lines, which would compete with the Interborough Rapid Transit Company (IRT) and the Brooklyn–Manhattan Transit Corporation (BMT), the two major subway operators of the time. On December 9, 1924, the New York City Board of Transportation (BOT) gave preliminary approval for the construction of the IND Eighth Avenue Line. This line consisted of a corridor connecting Inwood, Manhattan, to Downtown Brooklyn, running largely under Eighth Avenue but also paralleling Greenwich Avenue and Sixth Avenue in Lower Manhattan. The BOT announced a list of stations on the new line in February 1928, with an express station at Fourth Street and Sixth Avenue.

An additional line, the IND Sixth Avenue Line, was approved in 1925, running from Midtown Manhattan underneath Sixth Avenue, Houston Street, Essex Street, and the Rutgers Street Tunnel to Downtown Brooklyn. The IND Sixth Avenue Line was designed to replace the elevated IRT Sixth Avenue Line. The transfer hub between the Eighth Avenue and Sixth Avenue lines, at Sixth Avenue and West 4th Street in Greenwich Village, was named "West Fourth Street" as opposed to merely "Fourth Street" because the planners of the Independent Subway System believed there would be confusion between this station and "South Fourth Street", a proposed transfer station on the never-built IND Second System in Williamsburg, Brooklyn. Real estate developers expected that the construction of the West Fourth Street station would spur development around Sixth Avenue in Lower Manhattan.

==== Eighth Avenue Line ====
Work on the IND Eighth Avenue Line began in 1925. Most of the Eighth Avenue Line was dug using a cheap cut-and-cover method. The West 4th Street station was to be one of three Eighth Avenue Line stations underneath Sixth Avenue in Lower Manhattan; the other two stations were to be at Spring Street and Walker Street. As part of the construction of the Eighth Avenue Line in Lower Manhattan, Sixth Avenue was extended south to Church Street starting in 1926. This required the demolition of dozens of buildings along the route, including a hotel and several houses within the vicinity of the West Fourth Street station. By August 1930, the BOT reported that the Eighth Avenue Line was nearly completed, except for the stations between Chambers Street–Hudson Terminal and West Fourth Street, which were only 21 percent completed. The entire line was completed by September 1931, except for the installation of turnstiles.

A preview event for the new subway was hosted on September 8, 1932, two days before the official opening. The upper level of the West Fourth Street station opened on September 10, 1932, as part of the city-operated IND's initial segment, the Eighth Avenue Line between Chambers Street and 207th Street. When the station opened in 1932, express (A) and local (AA) trains served the line; expresses did not run during late nights or Sundays. When the IND Concourse Line opened on July 1, 1933, the C express train started operating, while all locals became CC trains to the Concourse Line. The E began using the local tracks on August 19, 1933, when the IND Queens Boulevard Line opened.

==== Sixth Avenue Line ====
The first portion of the Sixth Avenue Line to be constructed was the Houston–Essex Street Line south of the West Fourth Street station. The contract for the line was awarded to Corson Construction in January 1929, and work officially started in May 1929. The Houston–Essex Street Line opened on January 1, 1936. Two local tracks split from a junction with the Eighth Avenue Line south of West Fourth Street–Washington Square, running east under Houston Street and south under Essex Street to a temporary terminal at East Broadway. The E train, which had traveled to Chambers Street, was diverted along the new line south of West Fourth Street. When the Houston–Essex Street Line was completed in April 1936, E trains ran to Church Avenue.

The Midtown section of the Sixth Avenue Line was much more difficult to construct because part of this stretch of Sixth Avenue was already occupied by the Hudson & Manhattan Railroad (H&M)'s Uptown Hudson Tubes, which ran between Eighth and 33rd Streets. As a result, negotiations between the city and the H&M continued for several years. The IND and H&M finally came to an agreement in 1930. The city had decided to build the IND Sixth Avenue Line's local tracks around the pre-existing H&M tubes, and add express tracks for the IND underneath the H&M tubes at a later date.

The Midtown section of the Sixth Avenue Line did not begin construction until March 1936. The line was to connect with the lower level of the West Fourth Street station, which had already been constructed. The line's Midtown section opened on December 15, 1940. The F train, which made local stops along the Sixth Avenue Line, replaced the E train along the Houston–Essex Street Line and started serving the lower level of the West Fourth Street station.

=== Modifications ===
The Sixth Avenue Line's Midtown section, comprising the section between the West Fourth Street and 34th Street–Herald Square stations, originally did not have express tracks. On April 19, 1961, ground was broken for a $22 million project to build two express tracks between these two stations. On November 26, 1967, the express tracks started to be used by the B and D trains. At that time, the first part of the Chrystie Street Connection opened, connecting the express tracks at the Broadway–Lafayette Street station one stop south to the Manhattan Bridge. On July 1, 1968, another section of the Chrystie Street Connection opened, allowing Sixth and Eighth Avenue local trains to use the Williamsburg Bridge. The Williamsburg Bridge connection has been used by the M train since 2010. The Sixth Avenue Line station was also served by the JFK Express from 1978 to 1990 when it was discontinued.

As early as 1965, Manhattan borough president Earl Brown requested that mayor Robert F. Wagner Jr. add funding for an escalator at the West Fourth Street station to the city's capital budget. Two up-only escalators were installed in the station in 1970, connecting the Sixth Avenue Line platforms to the Eighth Avenue Line platforms; one escalator was installed on the northbound side, while the other was installed on the southbound side. As part of a $4.3 million project, the Metropolitan Transportation Authority (MTA) closed the escalators for renovations in 1998.

In 2002, the MTA announced that elevators would be installed at the West Fourth Street station. The elevator installation was delayed by over a year and was finally completed in April 2005, but the elevators then suffered from frequent breakdowns. In 2005 alone, the three elevators were out of service for a cumulative nine months, and one elevator was closed off for 134 days. That year, passengers made 57 complaints about the elevators, including seven instances in which riders were trapped in the elevators. Consequently, disability-rights groups sued the MTA over the elevators. In 2025, leaning benches were installed on the upper-level platforms, replacing some of the standard benches.

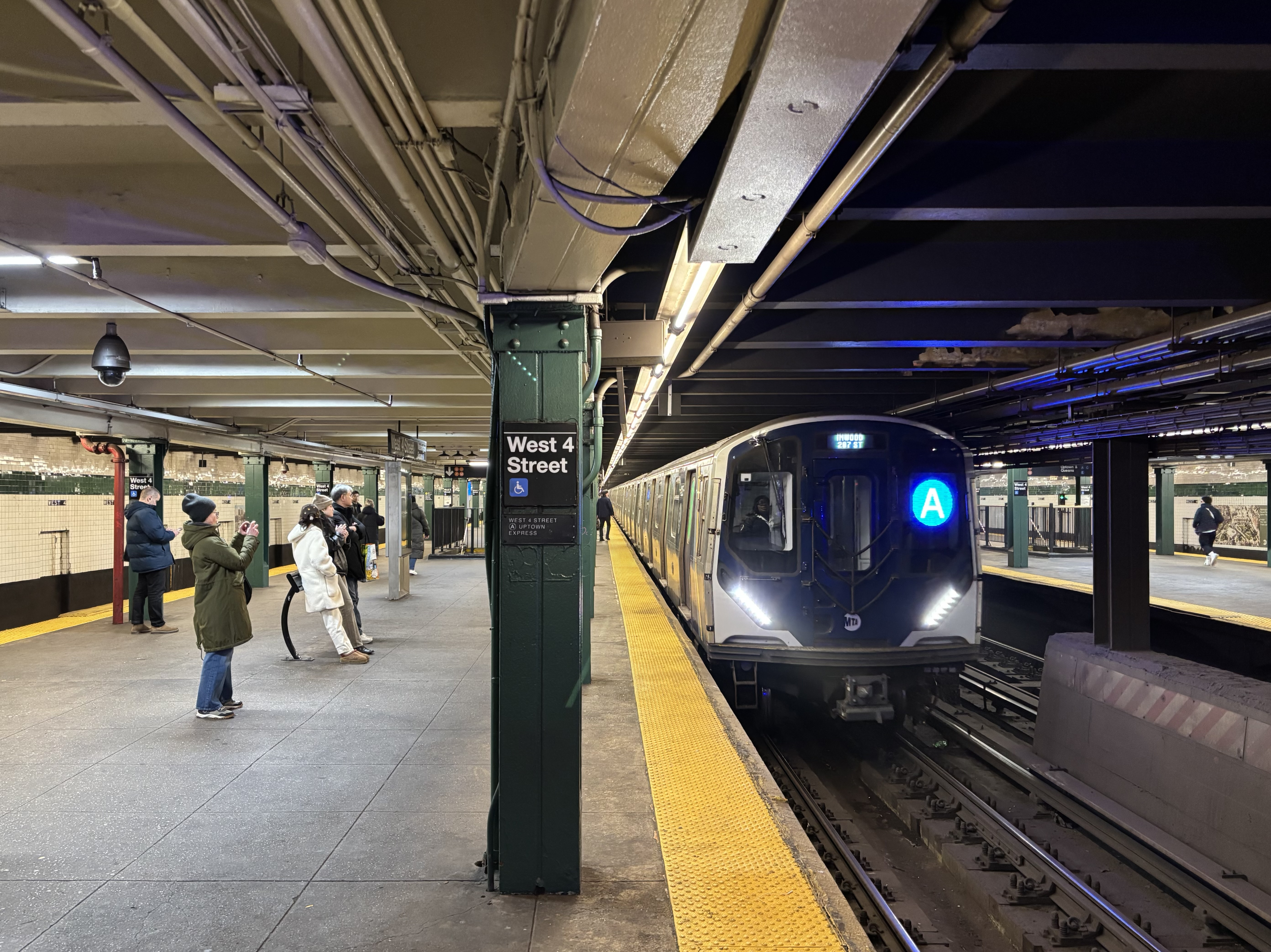
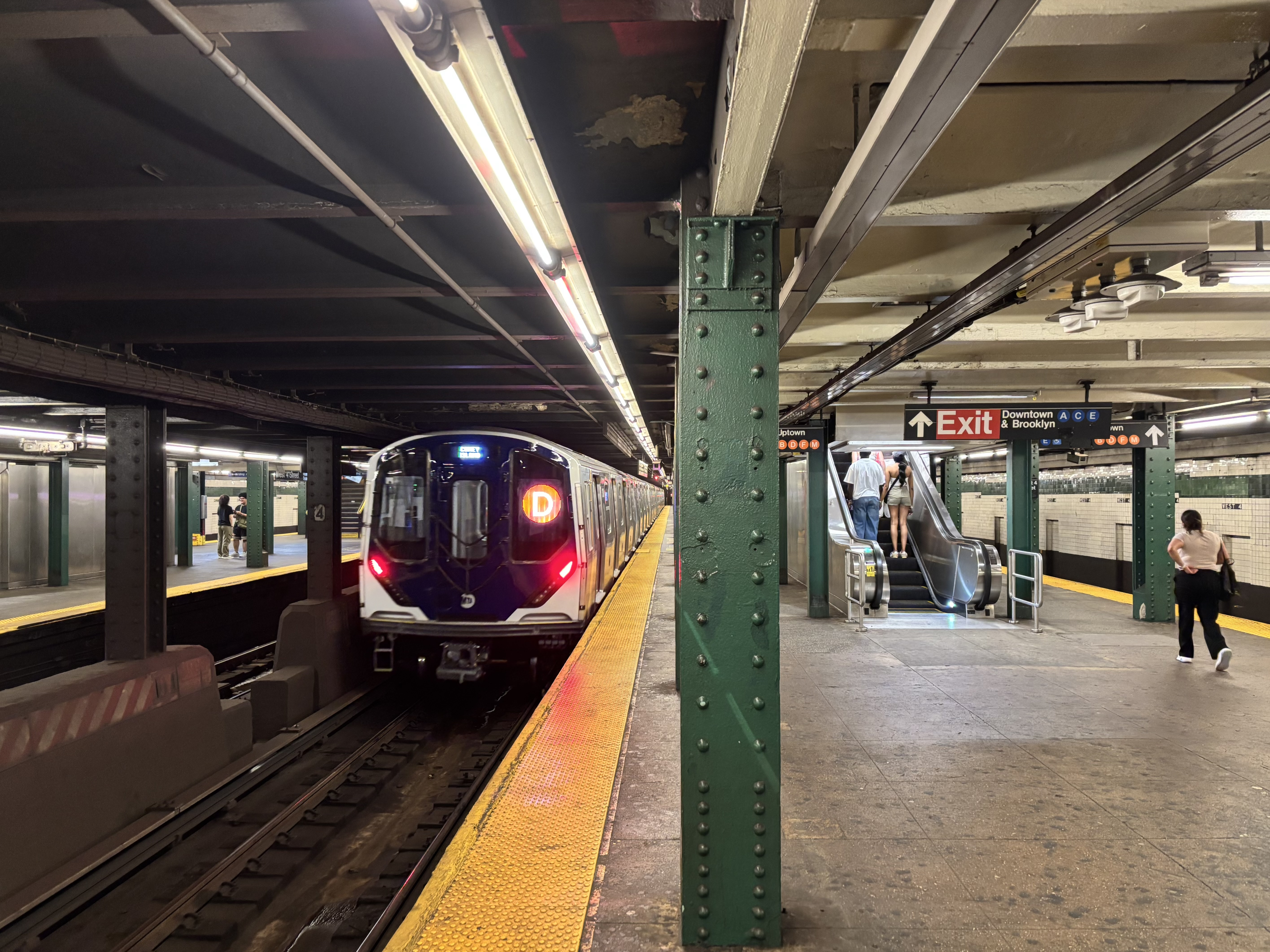
The upper level (at left) serves Eighth Avenue Line trains, while the lower level (at right) serves Sixth Avenue Line trains.

== Station layout ==
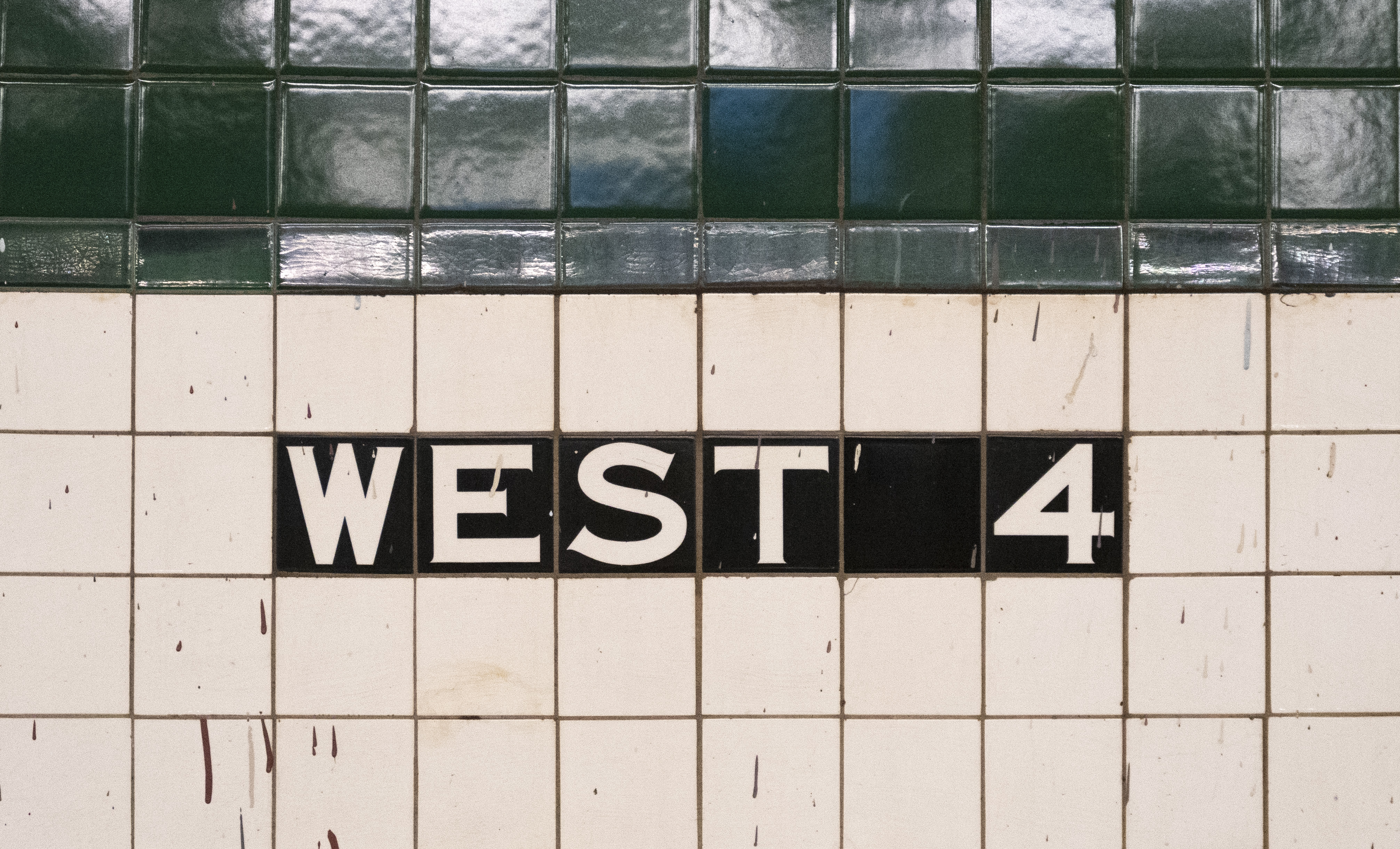
Tile caption below trim line

The West Fourth Street station was built by the Independent Subway System (IND) as the major transfer point between its two Manhattan trunk lines. It is the location of the zero point on the IND chaining. It is a bi-level station with a connecting concourse between the two platform levels. The Eighth Avenue Line occupies the upper level, while the Sixth Avenue Line uses the lower level. Both levels use identical platform arrangements–two island platforms between four tracks, allowing for cross-platform interchanges between local and express trains in each direction.

The Eighth Avenue Line's express tracks are used by the A at all times except late nights, while the Eighth Avenue Line's local tracks are used by the A at night, the C at all times except late nights, and the E at all times. The Sixth Avenue Line's express tracks are used by the B on weekdays during the day and the D at all times. The Sixth Avenue Line's local tracks are used by the F at all times, the <F> during rush hours in the peak direction, and the M on weekdays during the day. The next stop to the north is 14th Street/Sixth Avenue for Sixth Avenue local trains, 34th Street–Herald Square for Sixth Avenue express trains, and 14th Street/Eighth Avenue for all Eighth Avenue trains. The next stop to the south is Broadway–Lafayette Street for all Sixth Avenue trains, Spring Street for Eighth Avenue local trains, and Canal Street for Eighth Avenue express trains.

There are three fare control areas – two at the northern end of the station, and one at the southern end. All lead directly to the Eighth Avenue Line on the upper level platforms; access to the Sixth Avenue Line on the lower level is via stairs and elevators from the upper level and/or the full-length mezzanine between the two levels. Several escalators are present, which go directly between one of the lower level platforms to its corresponding upper level platform. The elevators, added in April 2005 to make the station ADA-accessible, provide access to both levels and to the mezzanine.

The walls of the station contain green-tile bands with green borders; since West 4th Street is an express station, it has a wider tile band than local stations. The tile colors were designed to facilitate navigation for travelers going away from Lower Manhattan; on the Sixth and Eighth Avenue lines, the tiles change color at the next express station to the north. As such, the green tiles used at the West Fourth Street station were also used on local stations to the north on Sixth Avenue, 14th Street and 23rd Street. The next express stations on either line, 14th Street on the Eighth Avenue Line and 34th Street–Herald Square on Sixth Avenue, used a different tile color. When the station was under construction, New York University (NYU) officials had requested that the station contain purple tile bands because that was NYU's official color. However, this was not done because it would not have fit with the color-coded tile system used on the rest of the IND. Small tile captions reading "WEST 4" run below the trim lines at regular intervals. Hunter green I-beam columns run along all the platforms, alternating ones having the standard black station name plate; The signs read "West 4 Street", replacing the older signs which simply read "W4".

=== Exits ===
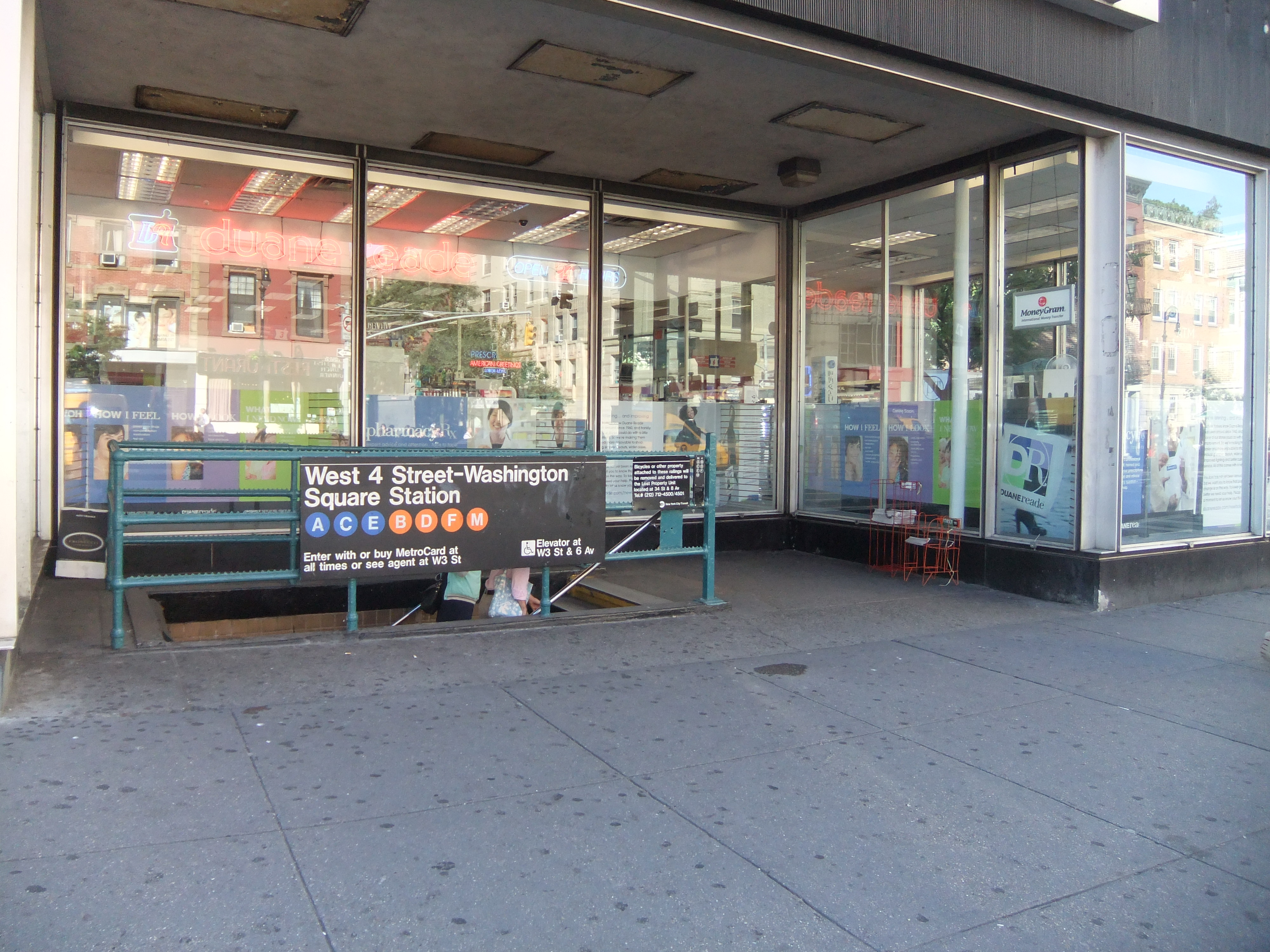
Street stair

The station does not have an exit to Fourth Street itself anymore, though an exit formerly existed there. The northern exits are on the northern side of 6th Avenue and Waverly Place. Two staircases go up to the northeast corner, both built into alcoves of stores, and one to the northwest corner. The southern exits are at West Third Street, on the east and west sides of 6th Avenue.

- Two to the northwest corner (within building), one to the northeast corner (within building) of Sixth Avenue and Waverly Place
- One to the east side of Sixth Avenue north of Waverly Place
- One elevator and staircase on the northeast corner of Sixth Avenue and West Third Street
- One on the west side of Sixth Avenue at West Third Street

There are also four additional closed exits that directly led to the mezzanine. Two went to Washington Place, and the other two went to West 4th Street itself. There is a fifth closed exit at one northern fare control area; it led to the southwestern corner of Greenwich Avenue and Sixth Avenue.

== Nearby points of interest ==
- New York University
- Washington Square Park
- West Fourth Street Courts

== See also ==
- National Register of Historic Places listings in Manhattan below 14th Street
