= Osama (name) =

Arabic male given name

- Gender: Male
- Language: Arabic

Origin
- Origin: Arabic
- Meaning: "Famed as a lion"
- Region of origin: Middle East and North Africa

Other names
- Alternative spelling: Osamah, Oussama, Usama, Usaamah

Osama (Arabic: أسامة, romanized: Usāma), also spelt Osamah, Oussama, Usama, and other variants, is an Arabic masculine given name.

The name derives from the same stem of the noun اسم ism "name", and means more or less "the one with a name"; it also has the additional meaning of "lion". The root is derived from Proto-Semitic *šim-, from Proto-Afroasiatic *(ʔi-)sim- ("name"). Osama is one of several Arabic names denoting some aspect of the lion.

The name has declined drastically in popularity in Britain since 2001, mainly due to negative associations with al-Qaeda's general emir Osama bin Laden.

== People with the given name ==
=== Osama ===
- Osama, a former ring name of American wrestler Armando Estrada (born 1976)
- Osama bin Laden (1957–2011), founder of al-Qaeda
- Osama al-Assaf (born 1953), Syrian lawyer and politician
- Osama Abdusalam (born 1983), Libyan football midfielder
- Osama Afifi, American bassist
- Osama Ali (born 1988), Iraqi footballer
- Osama Jamil Ali (born 1965), Kurdish politician
- Osama Alomar (born 1968), Syrian poet
- Osama El-Baz (1931–2013), Egyptian diplomat
- Osama Eldawoody, American undercover police officer
- Osama Elsamni (born 1988), Egyptian footballer born in Japan
- Osama Al Hamady (born 1975), Libyan football defender for Al-Ittihad
- Osama Hamdan (born 1965), senior member of Hamas
- Osama Hassan Ahmed, English terror suspect
- Osama Hassan (born 1979), Egyptian footballer with Ittihad
- Osama Hawsawi (born 1984), Saudi Arabian footballer
- Osama Hosny (born 1982), Egyptian footballer
- Osama Hussain (born 1971), Kuwaiti football defender
- Osama Kamal (born 1959), Egyptian engineer and politician
- Osama Al-Khurafi (born 1963), Kuwaiti fencer
- Osama Ali Maher (born 1968), Swedish conservative politician and Member of Parliament
- Osama Malik (born 1990), Australian footballer
- Osama Mazini (1966–2023), Palestinian politician
- Osama Mohamed (born 1979), Egyptian footballer
- Osama Mounir (born 1970), Christian Egyptian TV personality
- Osama Al-Muwallad (born 1984), Saudi Arabian football defender
- Osama Nabih (born 1975), Egyptian footballer for Itesalat
- Osama Anwar Okasha (1941–2010), Egyptian screenwriter and journalist
- Osama Orabi (born 1962), Egyptian footballer
- Osama El-Rady (1930–2005), Saudi psychiatrist
- Osama Rashid (born 1992), Dutch footballer
- Osama Saad (born 1954), Lebanese politician
- Osama Saeed (born 1980), Scottish politician
- Osama Vinladen (born 2001), Peruvian footballer
- Osama Al-Zain, Palestinian filmmaker and writer

=== Osamah ===
- Osamah Almarwai (born 1992) is a Saudi-born martial artist in the United States
- Osamah Al-Shanqiti, Saudi Arabian athlete
- Osamah Sami (born 1983), Iraqi-Australian actor, writer, and comedian

=== Oussama ===
- Oussama Assaidi (born 1988), Dutch footballer of Moroccan descent
- Oussama Cherribi (born 1959), Moroccan-Dutch sociologist and former politician for the VVD party
- Oussama Darragi (born 1987), Tunisian professional footballer
- Oussama Essabr (born 1989), Moroccan father Libyan mother footballer
- Oussama Kassir (born 1966), Lebanese-born Swedish militant Islamist
- Oussama Mellouli (born 1984), Tunisian swimmer
- Oussama Sellami (born 1979), Tunisian football player
- Oussama Souaidy (born 1981), Moroccan football player.

=== Usama ===
- Usama ibn Zayd (612–680), an early Muslim and Companion of the Prophet
- Usama Halabi (born 1959), advocate and senior lawyer in Jerusalem
- Usama Hasan (born 1971), British astronomer and religious writer
- Usama Al-Kini (1976–2008), Kenyan Al-Qaeda member
- Usama Muhammad (born 1954), Syrian film director and screenwriter
- Usama Mukwaya (born 1989), Ugandan screenwriter and director
- Usama Alshaibi (born 1969), Iraqi-American independent filmmaker and visual artist
- Usama Young (born 1985), American football player
- Usama Ishtay (born 1988), Syrian-Venezuelan fashion designer
- Usamah ibn Munqidh (1095–1188), 12th-century Arab historian, diplomat, and warrior

== See also ==
- Ōsama, Japanese guitarist
- Osamu Kitajima, Japanese musician and producer
- OsamaSon, American hip-hop artist
