= Rady =

Rady or El-Rady is a surname. Notable people with the surname include:

- Elsa Rady (1943–2011), American ceramist
- Martyn Rady (born 1955), British historian
- Michael Rady (born 1981), American actor
- Osama El-Rady (1930–2005), Saudi Arabian psychiatrist
- Pheak Rady (born 1989), Cambodian footballer

== Given name ==
- Rady Mom (born 1970), Cambodian American politician
- Rady Panov (born 1993), Bulgarian Canadian actor
