= Girl Fight (film) =

- Written by: Benita Garvin
- Directed by: Stephen Gyllenhaal
- Starring: Anne Heche; Jodelle Ferland; Tess Atkins; Keely Purvis; Linda Darlow; Genevieve Buechner; Chanelle Peloso; James Tupper
- Countries of origin: United States; Canada
- Original language: English

Production
- Producer: Harvey Kahn
- Running time: 90 minutes

Original release
- Network: Lifetime
- Release: October 3, 2011

Girl Fight is a television film that premiered on Lifetime on September 11, 2011. Inspired by true events, It stars Jodelle Ferland as Haley Macklin. The film revolves around a bullied and troubled 16-year-old girl (Ferland) who tries to fit in with a popular group of girls, leading to a brutal beating upon joining the clique.

The film was inspired by a 2008 beating in Florida; a video of some of the beating, released by Polk County Sheriff Grady Judd, was used heavily by the news media and the story caused nationwide public outrage. Anne Heche and James Tupper, who play Haley's parents, were a couple in real life until their split in 2018.

== Plot ==
Haley Macklin is an academically advanced high school student who feels like an outsider after skipping a grade. Frustrated at being excluded by a group of popular girls, she posts negative comments about them on a social networking website.

Haley befriends popular student Alexa Simons and is gradually accepted into her social circle, although some of the girls remain suspicious of her. As Haley becomes more involved with the group, her behavior changes and she begins disobeying her parents and treating her family disrespectfully.

After discovering Haley’s online comments, the girls feel betrayed and plot revenge. They lure Haley to Alexa’s house, where they beat her while recording the attack. Haley suffers serious injuries, including a concussion, ruptured eardrum, and damage to her left eye. The girls abandon her in a parking lot, where she is found by a passerby

After learning about the attack, Melissa confronts Alexa and the other girls involved, but they deny responsibility. Alexa’s grandmother, Marylou, becomes suspicious and discovers video evidence of Haley’s beating.

After receiving the video, Haley’s parents turn it over to authorities. Alexa and the other girls involved are arrested and charged with kidnapping and battery, with Alexa identified as the ringleader. Although some students at school support the attackers, circulation of the video leads to widespread public outrage.

As the case proceeds, Haley favors less severe punishment for her attackers. The five girls are ultimately convicted and receive varying sentences that include probation, jail time, community service and restitution, as well as restrictions on their use of social networking sites. Following the sentencing, Haley and Melissa leave the courthouse together.

== Cast ==
- Anne Heche as Melissa Macklin
- Jodelle Ferland as Haley Macklin
- James Tupper as Ray Macklin
- Tess Atkins as Alexa Simons
- Keely Purvis as Kristin Hempton
- Linda Darlow as Marylou Simons
- Genevieve Buechner as Lauren Kramer
- Chanelle Peloso as Dana
- Taylor Hui as Taylor Liu
- Caley Dimmock as Becca Lawrence
- Lanette Ware as DA Jane Dennett
- Rady Panov as Derek

== Production ==
The film was directed by Stephen Gyllenhaal from a screenplay by Benita Garvin and was produced by Front Street Pictures.

Girl Fight was inspired by the 2008 assault of Florida teenager Victoria Lindsay, who was attacked by several classmates while the assault was recorded on video. The incident received national media attention after footage of the attack was released. The film recreated portions of the recorded assault for its depiction of the attack on the fictional Haley Macklin.

Jodelle Ferland, who portrayed Haley, described filming the assault sequence as disturbing despite knowing that the violence was staged. The film was directed by Stephen Gyllenhaal from a screenplay by Benita Garvin and was produced by Front Street Pictures.
