= Shahawar Matin Siraj =

Pakistani-American terrorist

Shahawar Matin Siraj is a Pakistani-American who was convicted in 2006 of terrorism conspiracy, regarding a plot to bomb a New York City Subway station in Manhattan. Siraj worked at an Islamic bookstore in Bay Ridge, Brooklyn. Over a period of several months in 2004 he was recorded by an FBI informer Osama Eldawoody regarding a plot to plant a bomb in the 34th Street–Herald Square station. According to the New York City Police Department, Siraj was "extremely impressionable due to severe intellectual limitations" and never actually agreed to carry out an attack. He was sentenced to 30 years in prison in January 2007.

In April 2021, The New York Times published an extensive investigative journalism report making the case that Siraj was the victim of an entrapment scheme orchestrated by the FBI.

== Biography ==
Siraj, an immigrant from Pakistan who was not especially religious, worked in his uncle's Islamic bookstore in Bay Ridge and his uncle encouraged him to attend services at the nearby Islamic Society of Bay Ridge. He became more interested in Islam and also became irate about rumoured abuses of Muslim girls by American soldiers and about documented abuses of Muslims by American troops at the Abu Ghraib prison. His family had overstayed their visas and were attempting to gain political asylum so that they could remain in the United States.

== Investigation ==
Siraj was arrested in 2004. According to New York City Police Department (NYPD) records, Siraj was "extremely impressionable due to severe intellectual limitations". When asked to participate in an attack on New York City Subway station by an informant, Siraj replied that he had to ask his mother for permission first. The NYPD admitted that Siraj never actually agreed to participate in an attack. Siraj also had no explosives or understanding of explosives.

== U.S. v. Shahawar Matin Siraj ==
The trial received significant attention from local media outlets. The four-week trial was conducted in Brooklyn's Federal court.

=== Defense ===
The defense alleged that Siraj was "entrapped" into plotting the crime, after incitement of hatred by the police informant. Using his hatred of America, they claimed, he was convinced to commit a crime against American civilians, which he would not normally have been inclined to do. Many jurors said in anonymous interviews after the case that the "entrapment defense" was the most convincing in their hesitation to convict him.

They attacked the credibility of the prosecution's lead witness, Osama Eldawoody, on grounds that he was paid a total of $100,000 for his work as an informer, $25,000 of which he received during the year he conversed with Siraj. It was the informant's salary, they argued, that kept him interested in the issue and encouraged him to bring Siraj into such a predicament. Eldawoody stated he did not turn Siraj in for money, but rather, as a good Muslim who believed that his faith was not one to be degraded into one of terrorism. He is not likely to work for the NYPD again, simply because he may be recognized from the trial and/or his previous eavesdroppings.

The validity of the tapes was raised, and it was asserted that they may have been subject to review and censorship by the New York City Police Department, which was working alongside Eldawoody during his information-gathering visits. It was asserted that perhaps that the tapes were reviewed for incriminating content and may have been selectively edited—either by deletion or by Eldawoody himself—to leave out statements of encouragement and "entrapment" by Eldawoody that could have been critical proof for the defense.

=== Prosecution ===
The prosecutors, Todd Harrison and Marshall L. Miller, used digital recording from the defendant's conversations with Eldawoody, which were secretly made by the informant and handed to the police department as evidence. In these recordings, Siraj expressed excitement and pride in a plot to kill American civilians in Herald Square, which was strongly incriminating, albeit in a crime the defense felt was framed. The prosecution called their main witness, Eldawoody, who was the part-time police informant and a nuclear engineer used by the New York City's Police Department to infiltrate and eavesdrop on Islamic congregations around the city.

They attacked Siraj's credibility strongly because of many anti-American and anti-Semitic remarks he had made, some far before he had been encouraged into the bomb plot. These remarks, which would be regarded as reprehensible by the far majority of Americans, served to alienate the defendant as an ally to terrorist regimes and characterized him as a terrorist, despite the absence of weapons.

They were very convincing in showing that Siraj would have committed the crime if given the adequate weaponry. His sympathy of terrorist organizations such as Al-Qaeda and Hamas gave him a strikingly dangerous set of role models that would have meant he could have become violent and committed a terrorist act at any time if given the right amount of pressure. When Eldawoody told him that he was part of a terrorist organization from his country and that he could produce the materials to build a subway bomb, Siraj jumped onto the idea, they claim. They dismissed any allegations that Siraj was duped into the crime, stating that he was trying to "play dumb" rather than admit to his actual intentions. The fiery statements he made regarding the United States and his anti-American sentiment made him a dangerous individual at best. Eldawoody testified that "The defendant said that if anyone did... [a rape or murder] to his family, he would do the same thing, meaning a suicide bomb."

=== Verdict ===
The jury reached a guilty verdict for all four charges brought against him, leading to four charges of bomb plotting and conspiracy.

The defense's lead Defense Attorney, Martin Stolar, was disappointed and highly critical of the implications this case had for the civil rights of New Yorkers with these tactics being used by the NYPD. It represented the court precedent for a "police state" that gave the police license to instigate and eavesdrop on unfairly targeted people, especially Arab-Americans. He rejected any statements that this guilty verdict was a success in the war on terrorism, or that convicting Siraj had made New York safer.

=== Conviction ===
On January 8, 2007, a New York court sentenced Siraj to 30 years in prison. Siraj was previously held in a highly restrictive Communication Management Unit, but is currently at FCI Ashland, with a release date of April 17, 2030.
