= 28th Street station (BMT Broadway Line) =

New York City Subway station in Manhattan

28 Street
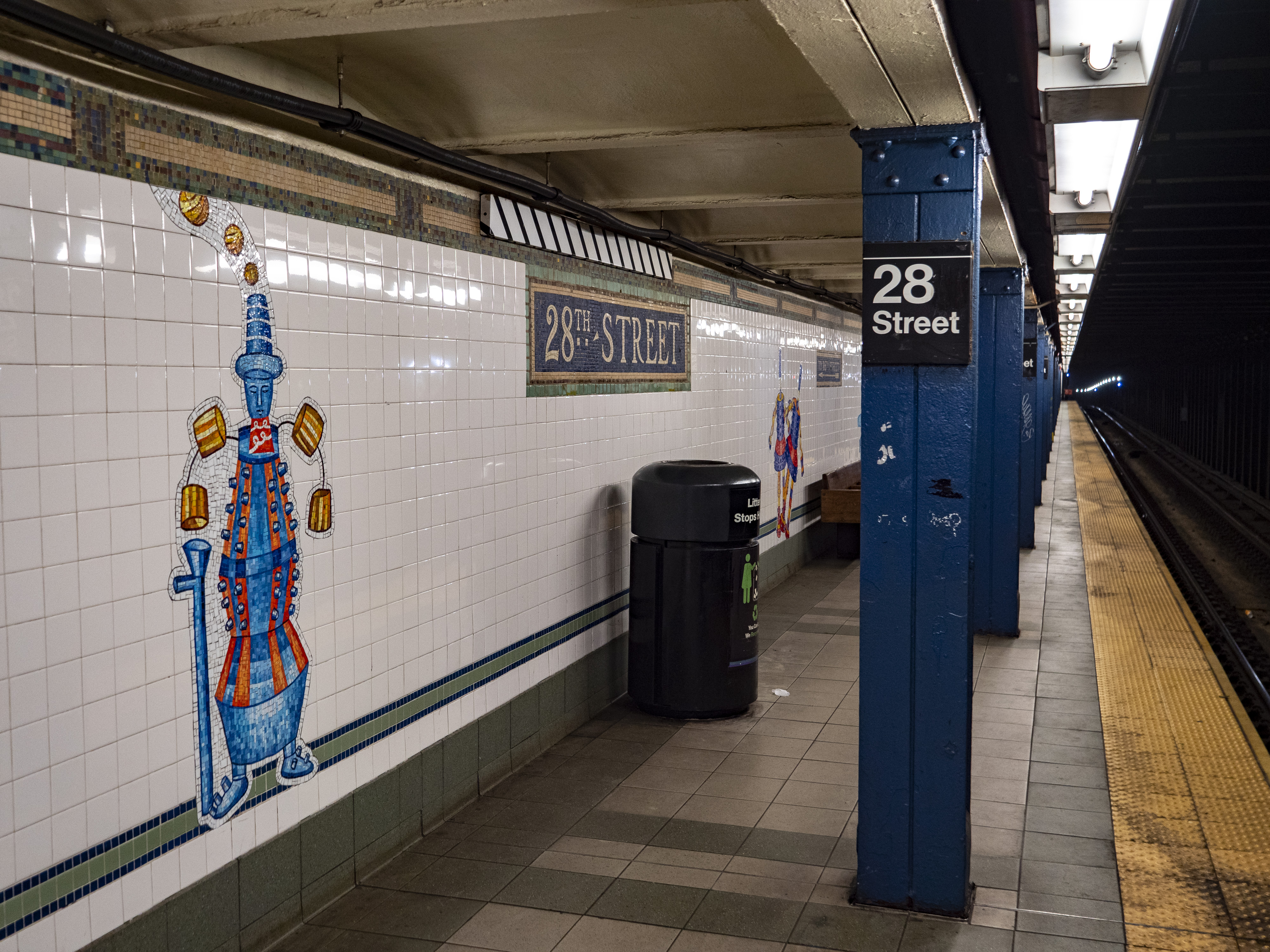
- Southbound platform

Station statistics
- Address: West 28th Street & Broadway; New York, New York
- Borough: Manhattan
- Locale: Midtown Manhattan, NoMad
- Coordinates: 40.745241°N 73.988757°W
- Division: B (BMT)
- Line: BMT Broadway Line
- Services: N (weekends and late nights); Q (late nights only); R (all except late nights); W (weekdays only)
- Transit: MTA Bus: BxM3, BxM4, BxM11, BxM18
- Structure: Underground
- Platforms: 2 side platforms
- Tracks: 4

Other information
- Opened: January 5, 1918 (108 years ago)

Traffic
- 2025: 3,260,095 ▲10.2%
- Rank: 116 out of 423
Services
Preceding station	New York City Subway	Following station
34th Street–Herald Square N Q R W via Lexington Avenue–59th Street	Local	23rd Street N Q R W via Whitehall Street–South Ferry
Location
Location within New York City Subway
Location within New York City
Location within New York
Track layout
Street map
Station service legend
Symbol	Description
Stops all times except late nights	Stops all times except late nights
Stops weekdays during the day	Stops weekdays during the day
Stops late nights and weekends	Stops late nights and weekends
Stops late nights only	Stops late nights only

The 28th Street station is a local station on the BMT Broadway Line of the New York City Subway, located at 28th Street and Broadway in Manhattan. It is served by the R train at all times except late nights, the W train on weekdays, the N train during late nights and weekends and the Q train during late nights.

== History ==
=== Construction and opening ===
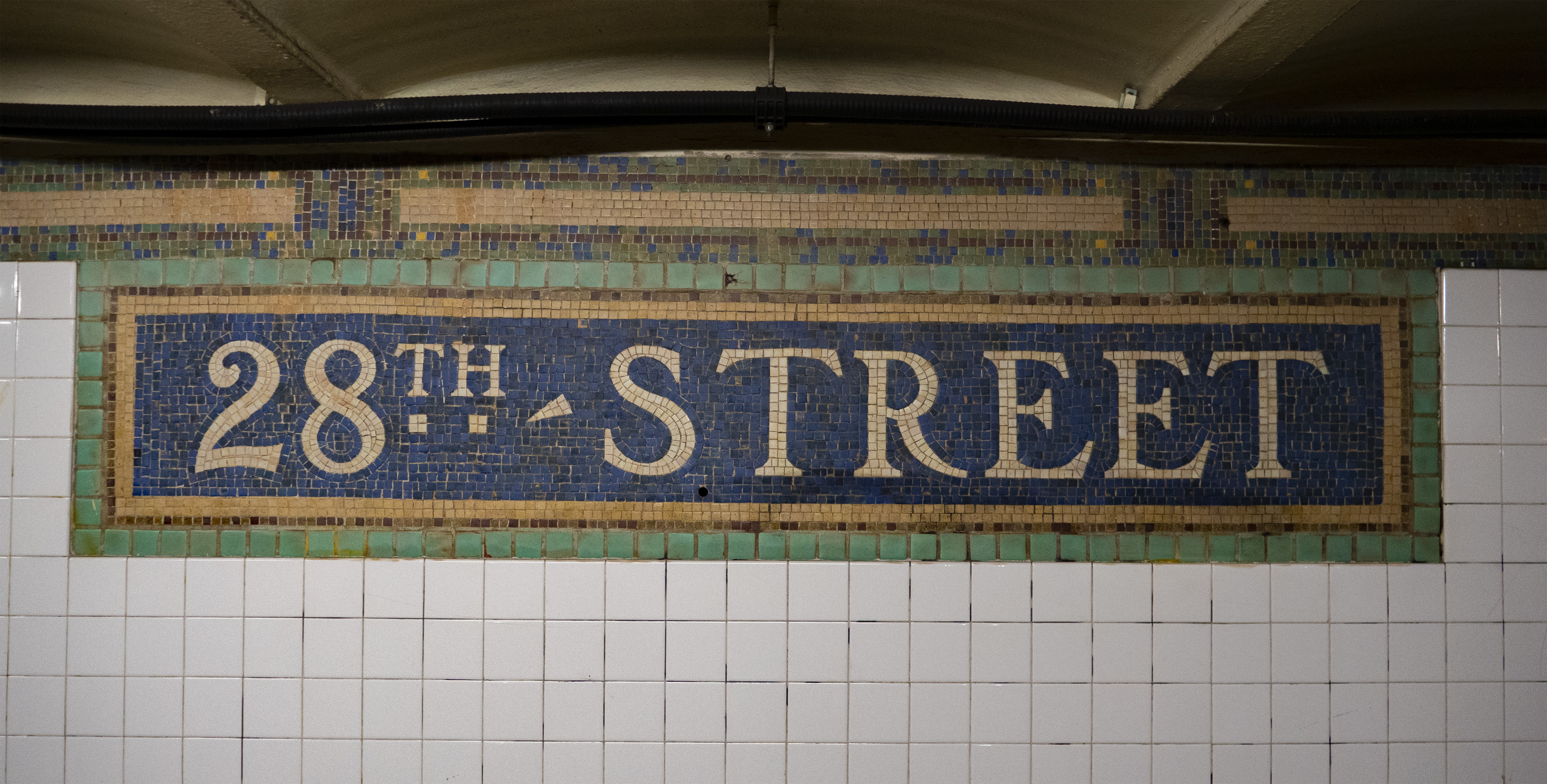
Original mosaic name tablet

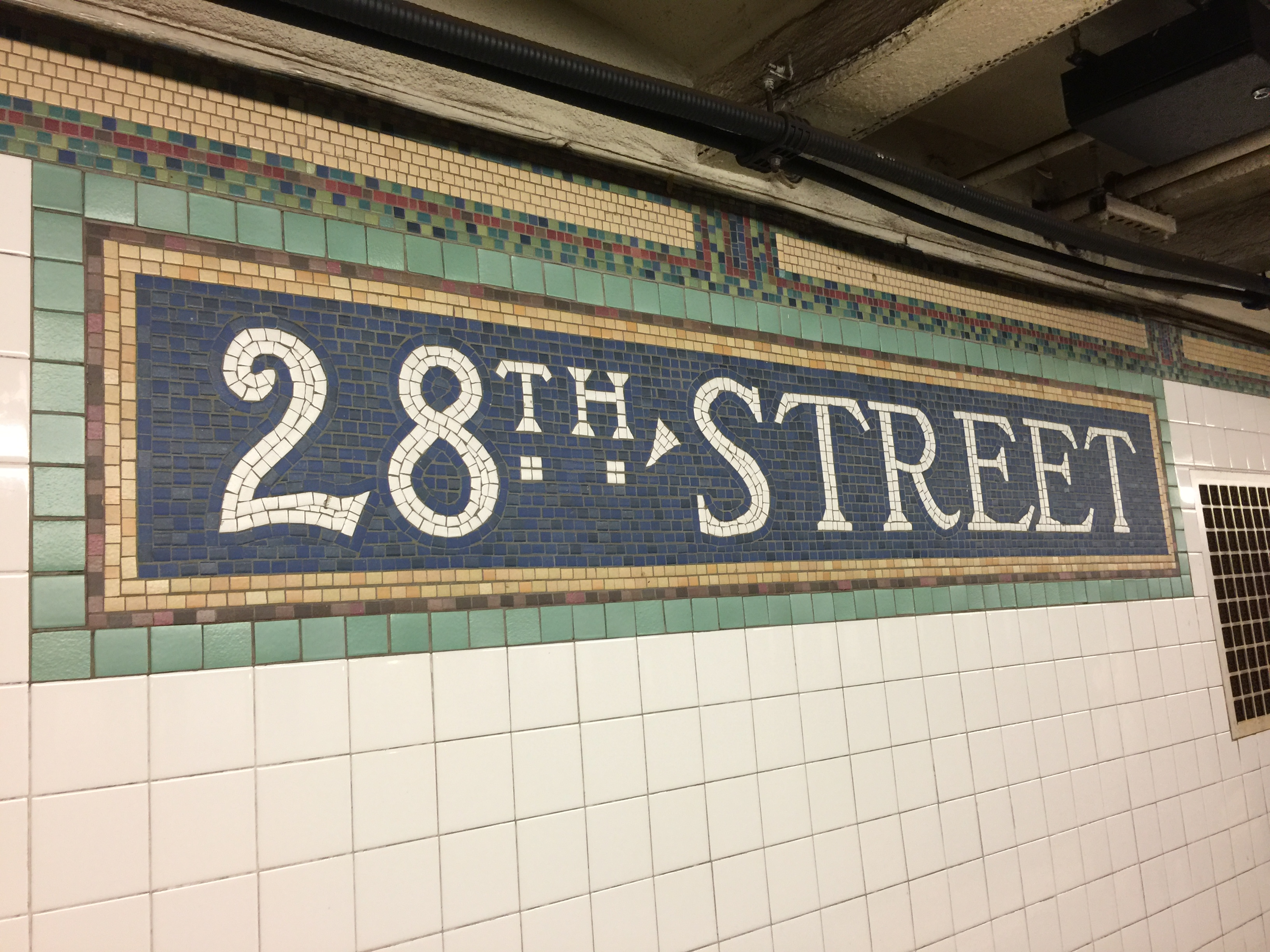
Later-installed name tablet

The New York Public Service Commission adopted plans for what was known as the Broadway–Lexington Avenue route on December 31, 1907. This route began at the Battery and ran under Greenwich Street, Vesey Street, Broadway to Ninth Street, private property to Irving Place, and Irving Place and Lexington Avenue to the Harlem River. After crossing under the Harlem River into the Bronx, the route split at Park Avenue and 138th Street, with one branch continuing north to and along Jerome Avenue to Woodlawn Cemetery, and the other heading east and northeast along 138th Street, Southern Boulevard, and Westchester Avenue to Pelham Bay Park. In early 1908, the Tri-borough plan was formed, combining this route, the under-construction Centre Street Loop Subway in Manhattan and Fourth Avenue Subway in Brooklyn, a Canal Street subway from the Fourth Avenue Subway via the Manhattan Bridge to the Hudson River, and several other lines in Brooklyn.

The Brooklyn Rapid Transit Company submitted a proposal to the commission, dated March 2, 1911, to operate the Tri-borough system (but under Church Street instead of Greenwich Street), as well as a branch along Broadway, Seventh Avenue, and 59th Street from Ninth Street north and east to the Queensboro Bridge; the Canal Street subway was to merge with the Broadway Line instead of continuing to the Hudson River. The city, the BRT, and the Interborough Rapid Transit Company (which operated the first subway and four elevated lines in Manhattan) came to an agreement, and sent a report to the New York City Board of Estimate on June 5, 1911. The line along Broadway to 59th Street was assigned to the BRT, while the IRT obtained the Lexington Avenue line, connecting with its existing route at Grand Central–42nd Street. Construction began on Lexington Avenue on July 31, and on Broadway the next year. The Dual Contracts, two operating contracts between the city and the BMT and IRT, were adopted on March 4, 1913.

A short portion of the line, coming off the north side of the Manhattan Bridge through Canal Street to 14th Street–Union Square, opened on September 4, 1917, at 2 P.M., with an eight car train carrying members of the Public Service Commission, representatives of the city government and officials of the BRT, leaving Union Square toward Coney Island. Service opened to the general public at 8 P.M., with trains leaving Union Square and Coney Island simultaneously. The line was served by two services. One route ran via the Fourth Avenue Line and the Sea Beach Line to Coney Island, while the other line, the short line, ran to Ninth Avenue, where passengers could transfer for West End and Culver Line service. The initial headway on the line was three minutes during rush hours, three minutes and forty-five seconds at other times, except during late nights when service ran every fifteen minutes.

28th Street station opened on January 5, 1918, as the BMT Broadway Line was extended north from 14th Street–Union Square to Times Square–42nd Street and south to Rector Street. Service at this station was provided by local services running between Times Square and Rector Street. Service was extended one station to Whitehall Street–South Ferry on September 20, 1918. On August 1, 1920, the Montague Street Tunnel opened, extending local service from Lower Manhattan to DeKalb Avenue in Downtown Brooklyn by traveling under the East River.

=== Later years ===
On August 6, 1927, bombs exploded at the 28th Street station and at the 28th Street station on the Lexington Avenue Line. Numerous passengers were injured, but there were no casualties, although investigators initially believed one person may have been killed. The perpetrator of the bombings is unknown; they were initially blamed on Galleanists, as Sacco and Vanzetti had been denied appeal three days prior, though police later believed they were unrelated.

The city government took over the BMT's operations on June 1, 1940. The station was renovated in the 1970s to accommodate ten-car trains. As part of the renovation, the original wall tiles, old signs, and incandescent lighting were covered by modern-look wall tile band and tablet mosaics, and new signs and fluorescent lights were installed. Staircases and platform edges were also renovated.

This station was renovated in 2001 by New York City Transit. It sealed off and removed any evidence of a crossunder outside fare control while false curtain walls were installed at the north ends of each platform, shortening them by 10 to 15 feet (3 to 4.5 meters), though the Brooklyn-bound platform is longer than the Queens-bound one. Tiles from the previous renovation in the 1970s were removed, restoring the station's original trim line and name tablets.

== Station layout ==
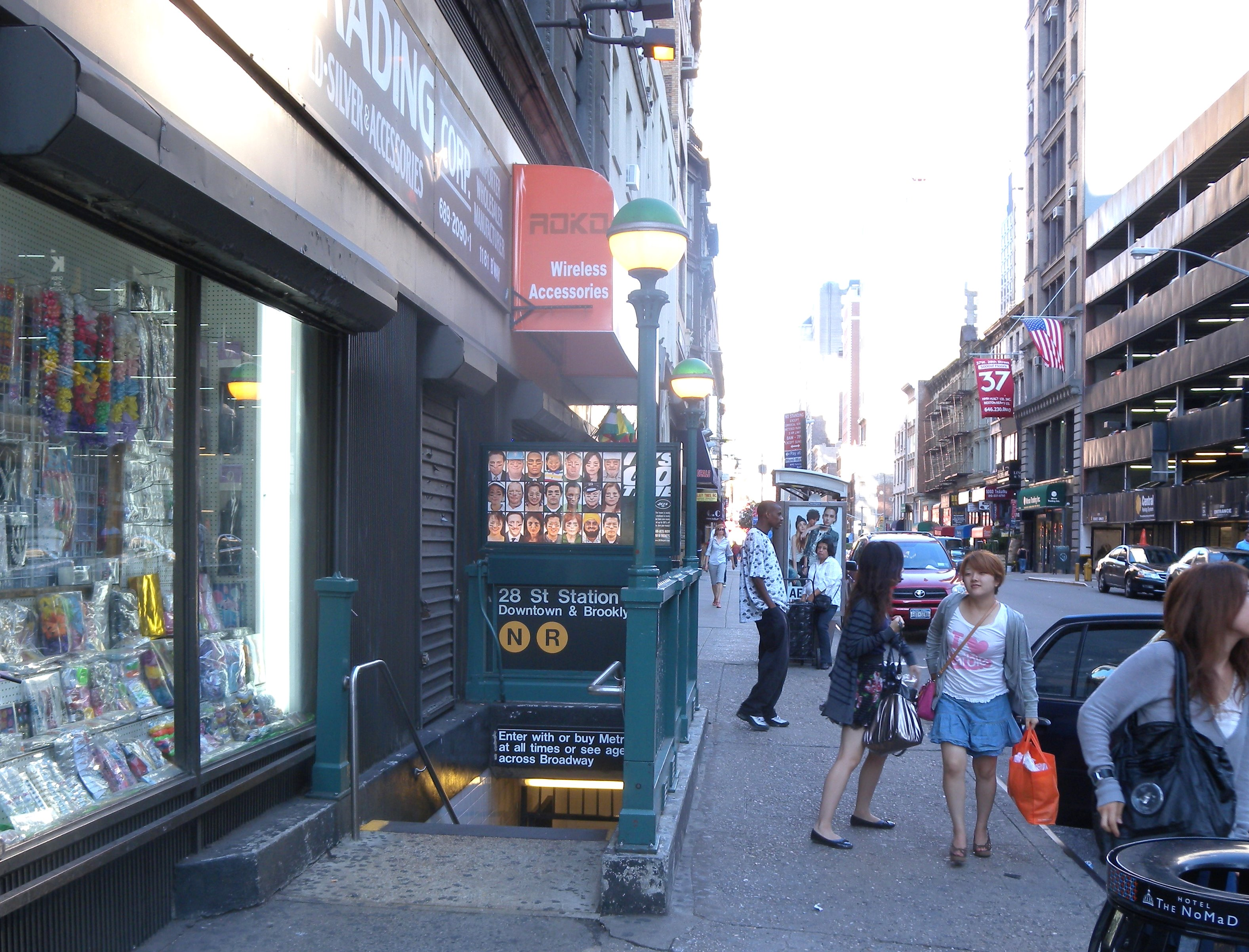
Southbound street stair before the return of the W in 2016

This underground station has four tracks and two side platforms. Both platforms are columnless and have their original BRT-style mosaics and station name tablets reading "28TH STREET" in serif font.

The 2002 artwork at this station is City Dwellers (for Costas and Maro) by Mark Hadjipateras. It is composed of glass mosaics inspired by the Toy Center and the surrounding areas of the Garment and Flower District.

=== Exits ===
Both platforms have one same-level fare control area at the center. Each one has a turnstile bank, token booth, and two street stairs. The ones on the northbound platform go up to either eastern corner of 28th Street and Broadway while the ones on the southbound platform go up to either western corner. There are no crossovers or crossunders to allow a free transfer between directions.

There are closed exits from each platform to all corners of 29th Street and Broadway. The exits to the northern corners are currently used as emergency exits and are blocked by hatches on street level, while the exits to the southern corners were sealed on street level.
