= Noksu (restaurant) =

Korean restaurant in New York City

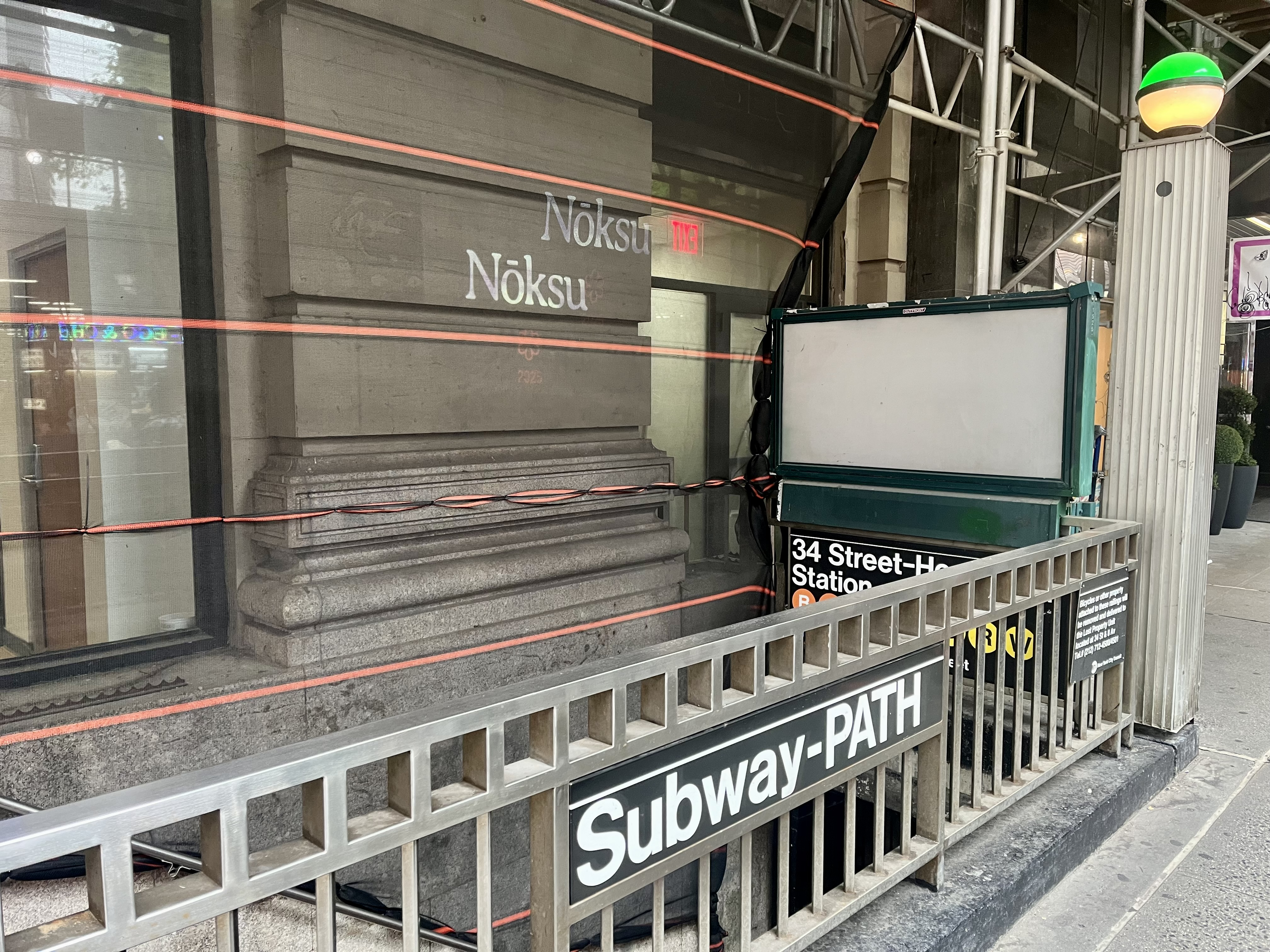
- Staircase leading to the subway station and the restaurant's entrance
- Interactive map of Noksu

Restaurant information
- Established: October, 2023
- Owner: Bobby Kwak
- Head chef: Aaron Chang
- Food type: Korean
- Rating: (Michelin Guide (2024-present)
- Location: 49 West 32nd Street (basement), New York City, Manhattan, New York, 10001, United States
- Coordinates: 40°44′54″N 73°59′16″W
- Seating capacity: 15
- Reservations: Required
- Website: Official website

Nōksu, or Noksu, (Korean: 녹수; lit. 'of the earth') is a Korean restaurant in New York City associated with the Martinique Hotel by Hilton. It is located in Koreatown, Manhattan, under Herald Square, within the entrance to the New York City Subway's 34th Street–Herald Square station.

== Operation ==
The restaurant commenced business in 2023 and received a Michelin star in 2024. It was previously run by Dae Kim; as of 2026 Aaron Chang serves as its head chef. Noksu specializes in Korean cuisine with influences from Japanese and Chinese culinary traditions.

The restaurant is located behind an unmarked door at the foot of a staircase at the northeast corner of Broadway and 32nd Street (Korea Way) that leads to the 34th Street–Herald Square station complex. The underground space was formerly occupied by a barbershop and newsstand.

== Reception ==
According to Pete Wells of The New York Times, Noksu is affordable only to select few and lacks an identity of its own as it fails to distinguish itself from other "expensive tasting-menu restaurants." However, Wells writes that the restaurant's chef Dae Kim is a "star in the making".

Tori Latham of Robb Report regards Noksu to be "NYC's coolest new Korean restaurant".

== See also ==
- List of Korean restaurants
- List of Michelin-starred restaurants in New York City
