= Osama Eldawoody =

Osama Eldawoody is a US citizen with a self-proclaimed nuclear engineering degree who has worked as a paid New York City Police Department informant to work undercover in Mosques in the New York metropolitan area. In 2004, his work broke up an alleged terrorist plot by Shahawar Matin Siraj and James Elshafay to blow up the 34th Street–Herald Square station of the New York City Subway, and the Macy's Herald Square Department Store, one of the largest in the world. Court documents and statements from Siraj were inconsistent with Eldawoody's testimony. However, in both instances, his methodology were reported to include entrapping the potential "terrorists" with aggressive and misleading tactics. Some have claimed he created the terrorist plots himself to entrap young and vulnerable people in order to get the FBI and NYPD payments and recognition, and that there were no credible terrorist threats to begin with.
