= 100 West 33rd Street =

Building in Manhattan, New York

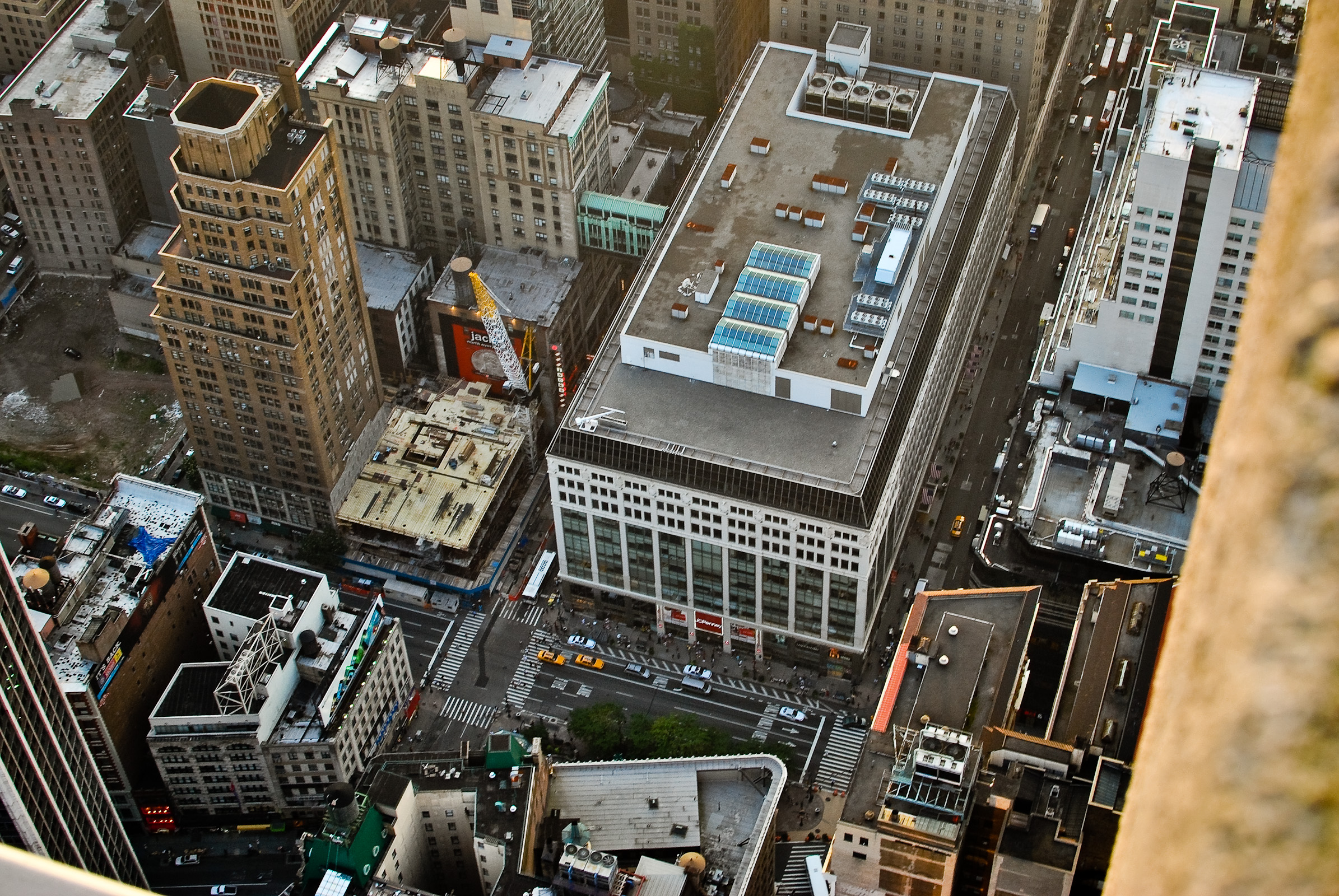
- Aerial view of 100 West 33rd Street (center right) from the Empire State Building (2009)
- Interactive map of the 100 West 33rd Street area
- Former names: A&S Plaza (1989–1995); Manhattan Mall (1995–2021)

General information
- Status: Partially closed
- Type: Retail; department store; shopping mall; office
- Location: 100 West 33rd Street, New York City, New York, United States
- Coordinates: 40.749°N 73.989°W
- Opened: September 29, 1929; 97 years ago; 1989; 37 years ago (shopping mall)
- Owner: Vornado Realty Trust
- Operator: Vornado Realty Trust

Technical details
- Floor count: 4 (former mall concourse)
- Floor area: 243,000 square feet (22,600 m^{2}) (former mall concourse)

Design and construction
- Architect: Daniel Burnham

Other information
- Number of stores: 40 (2019)
- Number of anchors: 1 (vacant)
- Public transit: New York City Subway: at 34th Street–Herald Square; PATH: JSQ-33, JSQ-33 (via HOB), and HOB-33 at 33rd Street

Website
- www.vno.com/street-retail/property/manhattan-mall/100-west-33rd-street/3311653/landing

100 West 33rd Street is a building in the Midtown Manhattan neighborhood of New York City, New York, United States. It was designed by Daniel Burnham, and opened in 1929. It was the flagship store of the Gimbels department store chain until 1986. Abraham & Straus replaced Gimbels in 1989, was converted to Stern's in 1995, and closed in 2001. JCPenney filled the vacancy in 2009 and closed in 2020. The interior mall concourse was known as the A&S Plaza from 1989 until 1995, and the Manhattan Mall from 1995 until 2021, during which period the upper levels were converted to office space and the remaining retail tenants relocated.

As of 2022, the former mall concourse functions as a large lobby for the office space above. The building allows direct access to Sixth Avenue, and has entrances to the New York City Subway's 34th Street–Herald Square station and the PATH's 33rd Street station on the second basement level.

== History ==
The structure was originally built as the flagship of the Gimbels department store chain. It was designed by famed architect Daniel Burnham and opened on September 29, 1910. The store was located in the cluster of large department stores that surrounded Herald Square, in Midtown Manhattan. It offered 27 acres (110,000 m^{2}) of selling space. A major selling point was its many doors leading to the Herald Square New York City Subway station. On the other hand, by the time Gimbels closed in 1986, the store had the highest rate of "shrinkage", or shoplifting losses, in the world. Doors also opened to a pedestrian passage under 33rd Street, connecting Penn Station to the 34th Street (New York City Subway) and 33rd Street (PATH) stations. This Gimbels Passageway was closed in the 1990s for security reasons during a period of high crime.

Gimbels closed in 1986. After a renovation, the structure reopened in 1989 as A&S Plaza, anchored by an A&S department store. The mall was originally 13 stories high, but difficult access to upper floors made the whole mall a financial failure.

A&S became Stern's in 1995 and the structure was renamed Manhattan Mall. In September 2000, Federated Department Stores announced that it would close the Stern's location in Manhattan. The store closed in January 2001 shortly before Federated decided to discontinue the Stern's chain as a whole. The anchor store was divided into smaller spaces, including a Steve & Barry's and a relocated food court. The upper ten levels were converted to office space shortly after the closure of Stern's.

Venture bought the building in 1999 for $135 million and sold it to Vornado Realty Trust in 2006 for $689 million.

On April 18, 2007, JCPenney announced that it would open a 150,000-square-foot (14,000 m^{2}) anchor store on the lower levels of the mall. It was the first JCPenney store in Manhattan. The mall's food court, which contained the only Arby's restaurant in Manhattan at the time, along with retailers such as Steve & Barry's, Brookstone and Nine West were closed in 2008 to make way for the new store. The store officially opened on July 31, 2009. On July 7, 2020, JCPenney closed permanently as part of a plan to close 151 stores nationwide. As of November 2021, clothing store Aeropostale moved into the former Express in the front of the mall having an external entrance, leaving LensCrafters as the last store in the mall. The mall has closed to foot traffic and LensCrafters is only accessible by appointment.

== List of notable tenants ==
Name	Year opened	Year closed	Notes
Abraham & Straus	1989	1995	
Arby's		2007	Only location in Manhattan
Gimbels	1929	1986	
JCPenney	2009	2020	First location in Manhattan
LensCrafters		—N/a	Last tenant in mall concourse
Stern's	1995	2001	

== Gallery ==
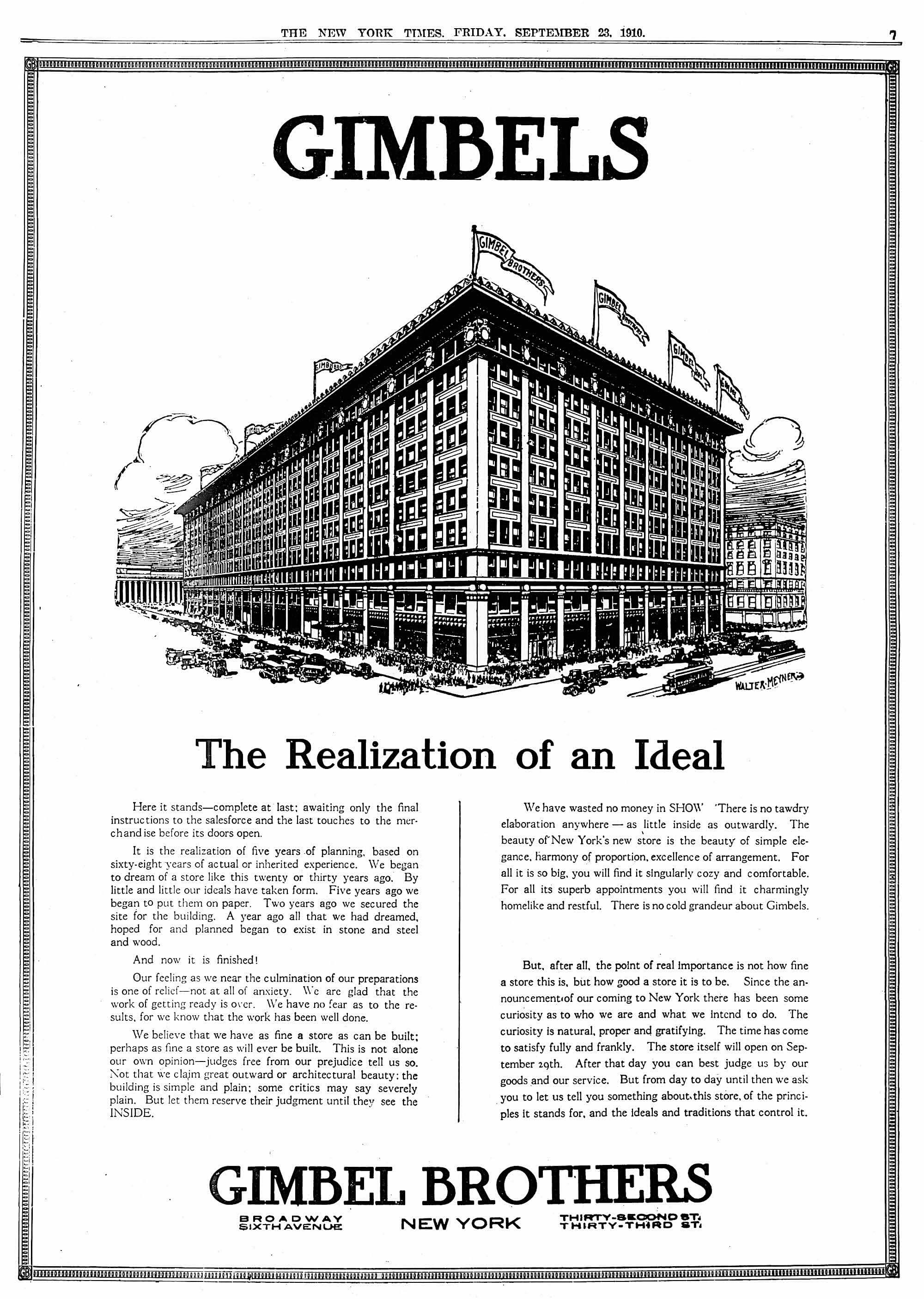
Advertisement celebrating the grand opening of Gimbels' flagship store, 1910

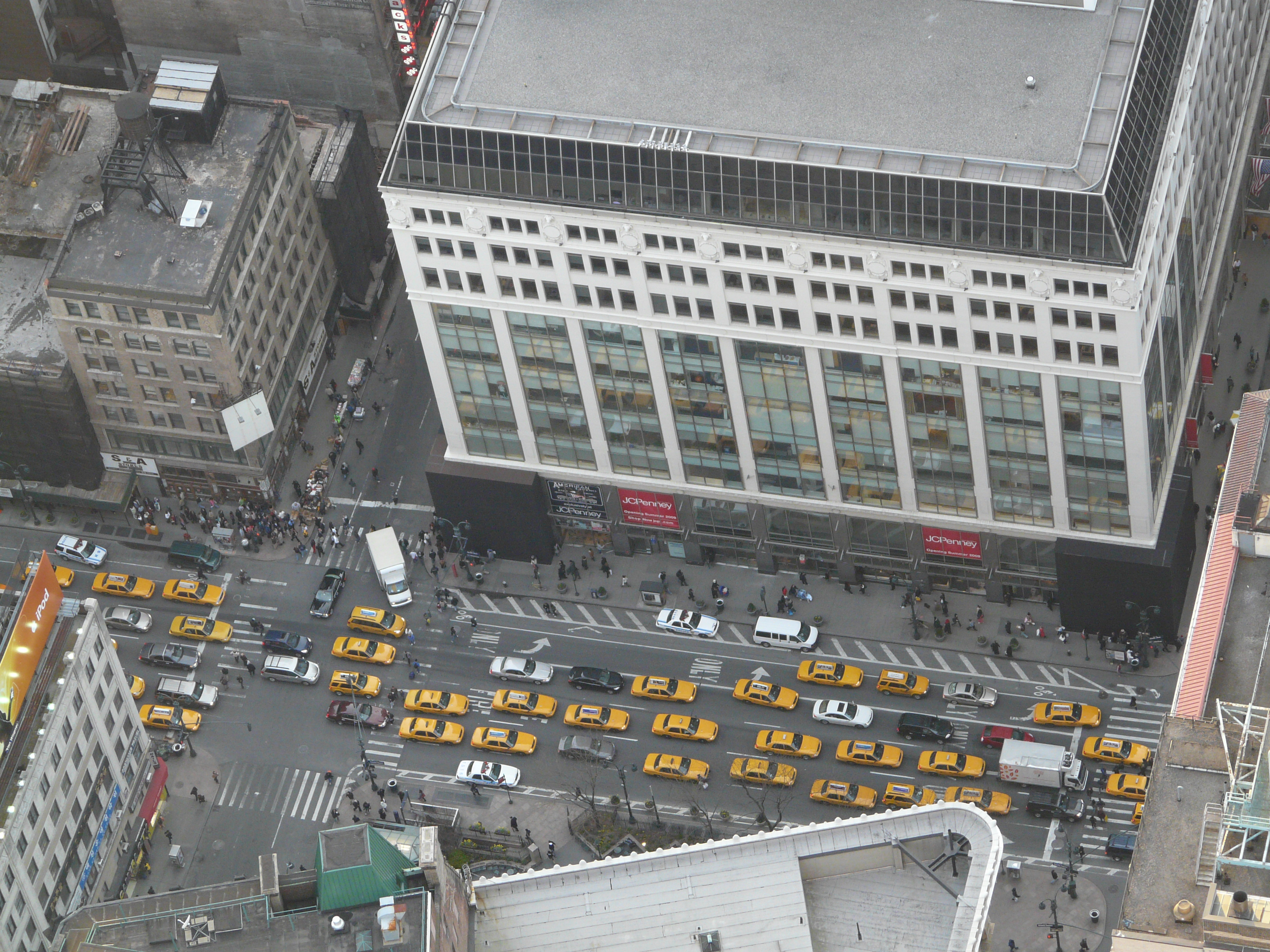
Aerial view of Manhattan Mall

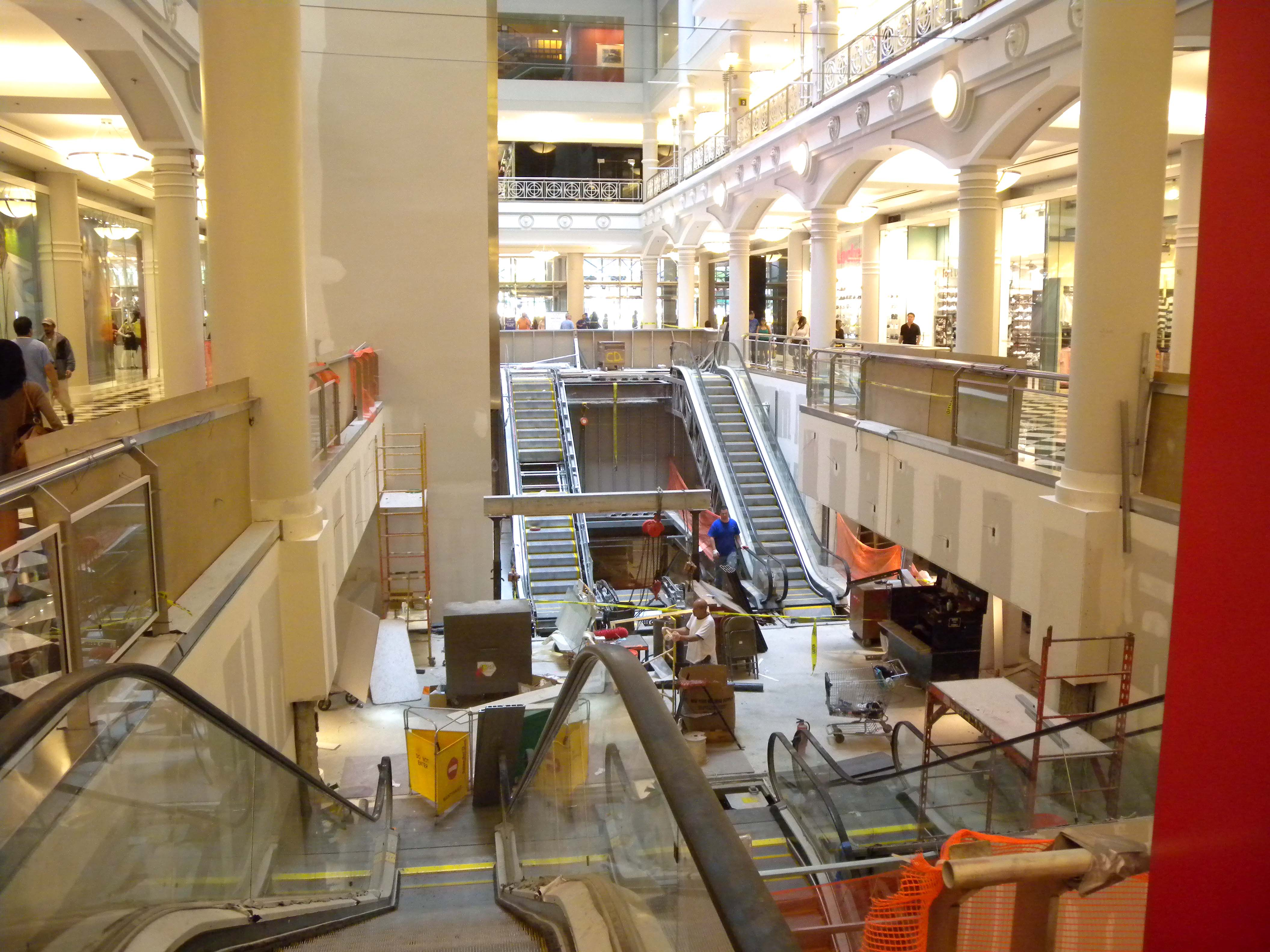
Under renovation

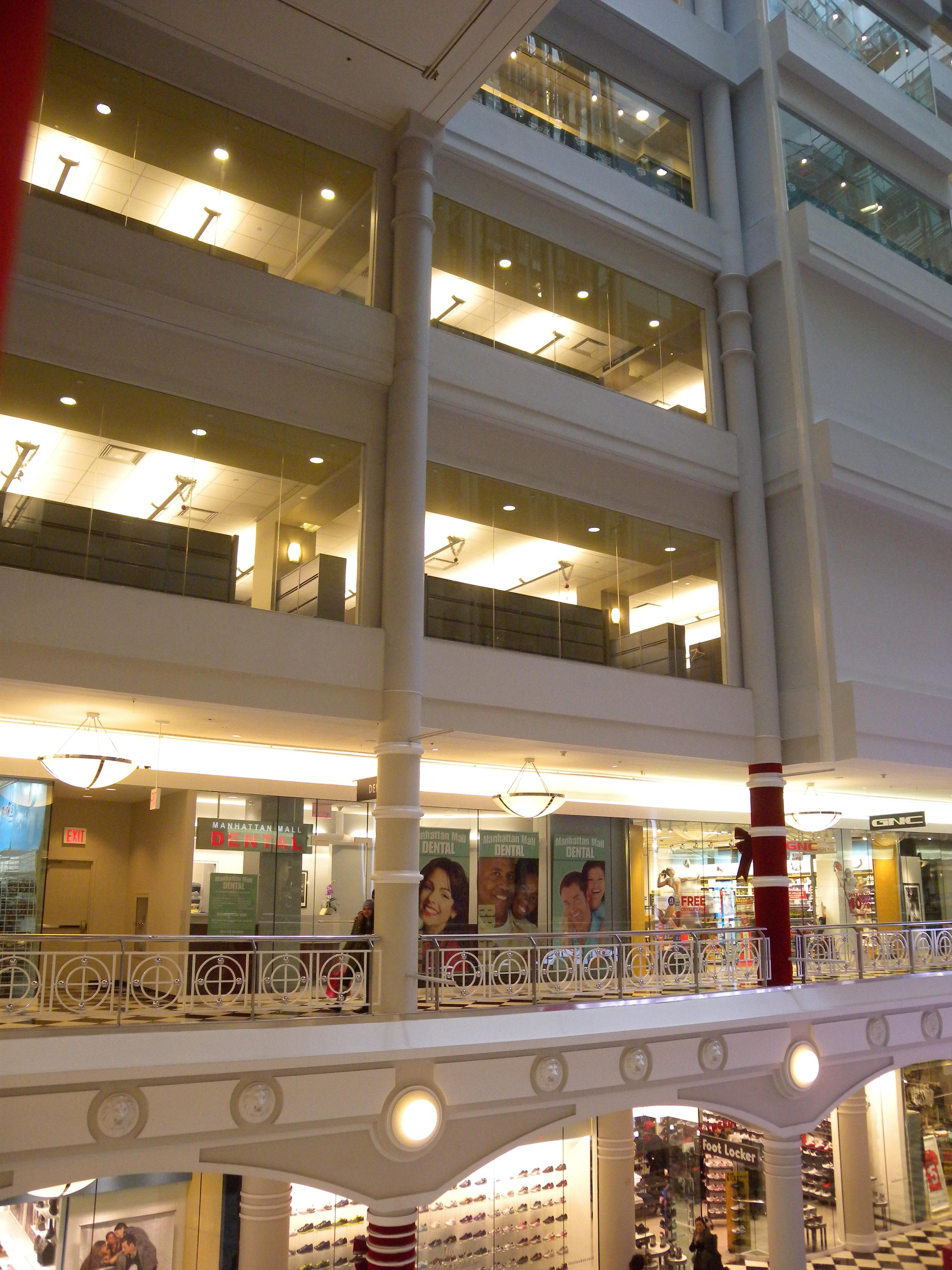
Former shops, now offices

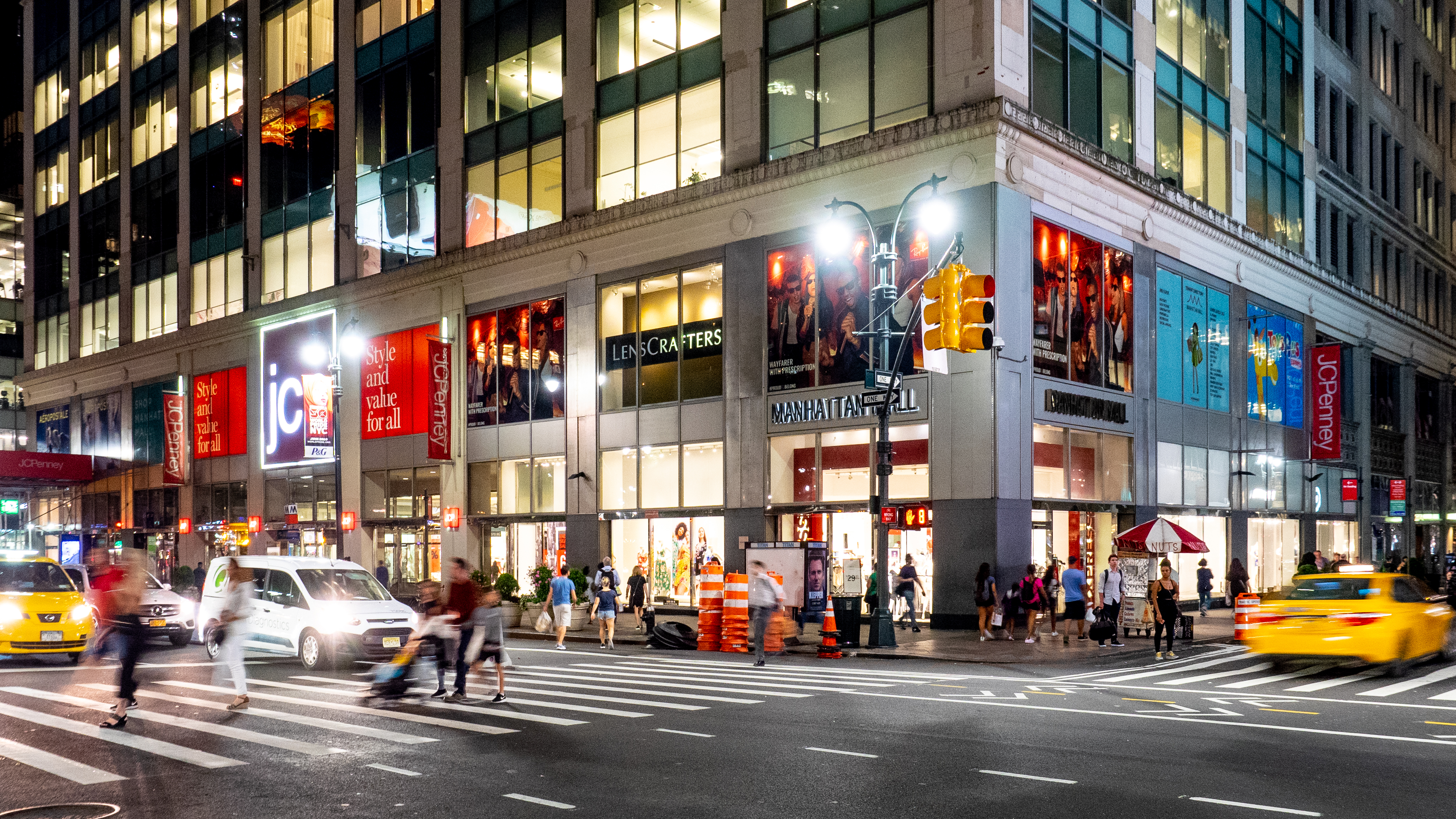
Exterior of the former JCPenney
