= Osama Vinladen =

Peruvian footballer (born 2002)

Personal information
- Full name: Osama Vinladen Jiménez López
- Date of birth: 7 October 2002 (age 24)
- Place of birth: Rioja, Peru
- Height: 5 ft 9 in (1.74 m)
- Position: Midfielder

Team information
- Current team: Unión Comercio
- Number: 15

Senior career*
Years	Team	Apps	(Gls)
2018–	Unión Comercio	53	(3)
- * Club domestic league appearances and goals as of 20:13, 3 April 2024 (UTC)

Osama Vinladen Jiménez López (Spanish: [oˈsama βinˈlaðeŋ xiˈmenes ˈlopes]; born 7 October 2002) is a Peruvian professional footballer who plays as a midfielder for Unión Comercio in the Peruvian Primera División.

== Club career ==
Vinladen made his professional debut for Unión Comercio on 30 May 2018 against Universidad San Martín when he entered the game as a substitute in the 87th minute. The match ended in a 0–0 draw.

== International career ==
Vinladen was part of the Peru U-15 squad that participated in the 2017 South American U-15 Championship.

== Personal life ==
Vinladen is named after Osama bin Laden, the founder of Al-Qaeda – in Spanish, the letters ⟨v⟩ and ⟨b⟩ represent the same phoneme and they both sound [b] or [β̞], depending on the surrounding phonemes (see Spanish phonology) – and has a brother named "Sadam Huseín" after the dictator of Iraq. His father wanted to name a potential third son "George Bush" but the baby turned out to be a girl. When Vinladen had a son of his own, his father again suggested "George Bush", but he chose a conventional name instead.

Vinladen told the Peruvian press: "My friends used to make fun of me and at the beginning it bothered me. But you learn to live with it and I feel normal now." He always wondered why his parents gave him such a controversial name but never received an explanation from them: "I asked my dad the reason, but he always avoids talking about it." In a radio interview in 2020, he made the following connection: "When Osama bin Laden knocked down the Twin Towers, the name was in the news and I was born [a year later] on October 7, 2002." He added that his father liked the name and also stated that he had often thought about changing it but never did so. To avoid criticism, only his first name "Osama" appears on his jersey.

During another interview, a journalist asked him if it was dishonourable to bear the name of someone as bad as bin Laden or not, to which he responded: "I do not believe my name to be problematic," citing the multiple "Hitlers" who became public figures in Peru and Brazilian footballer Marx Lenin as other figures with similarly controversial names.

== Career statistics ==
=== Club ===
As of match played 21 September 2025

Appearances and goals by club, season and competition
Club	Division	League			Cup		Continental		Total	
Club	Division	Season	Apps	Goals	Apps	Goals	Apps	Goals	Apps	Goals
Unión Comercio	Torneo Descentralizado	2018	1	0	—		—		1	0
Unión Comercio	Liga 2	2020	2	0	—		—		2	0
Unión Comercio	Liga 2	2021	16	2	3	0	—		19	2
Unión Comercio	Liga 2	2022	19	1	—		—		19	1
Unión Comercio	Liga 1	2023	7	0	—		—		7	0
Unión Comercio	Liga 1	2024	5	0	—		—		5	0
Unión Comercio	Liga 2	2025	20	0	—		—		20	0
Career total			70	3	3	0	—		73	3
