= Osama Hassan Ahmed =

British terrorist suspect

Osama Hassan Ahmed Mohammed (اسامة حسان أحمد) was arrested on 28 September 1998 in the United Kingdom under accusation of membership in al-Jihad. Along with seven other Middle Eastern men living in Britain, he was arrested in a raid called Operation Challenge, planned by the Met, MI5, and the FBI and approved under the Prevention of Terrorism (Temporary Provisions) Act 1989. They were all released on lack of evidence but police quickly re-arrested Mohammed on grounds of national security. He was sentenced to five years in prison with hard labour. The home office attempted to deport him to Cairo but the Egyptian government pushed back, saying they could not "guarantee his safety." Six months after the arrests, British Muslims staged a demonstration in front of 10 Downing Street to protest the continued incarceration of the seven men.

In 1998, just prior to his arrest, Mohammed came to the UK from Albania. His wife, who lived in Hayes with their four children, had cancer.
