= Marx Lenin =

Brazilian footballer

Personal information
- Full name: Marx Lênin dos Santos Gonçalves
- Date of birth: 11 April 2000 (age 26)
- Place of birth: Rio de Janeiro, Brazil
- Height: 1.76 m (5 ft 9 in)
- Position: Attacking midfielder

Team information
- Current team: Amazonas

Youth career
- 2015–2020: Flamengo
- 2019: → Avaí (loan)

Senior career*
Years	Team	Apps	(Gls)
2021–2023	Akron Tolyatti		
2024–	Amazonas		
2024	→ Galícia (loan)		
- * Club domestic league appearances and goals as of 24 July 2024

Marx Lenin dos Santos Gonçalves (born 11 April 2000), better known as Marx Lenin, is a Brazilian professional footballer who plays as an attacking midfielder for Amazonas.

== Career ==
Due to his unusual name, a mixture of the names of Karl Marx and Vladimir Lenin, he caught the public's attention even in Flamengo's youth categories. He played alongside Vinícius Júnior during the period, but he was not used in the professional team, being traded to Akron Tolyatti in Russia. In March 2024, he returned to Brazil to play for Amazonas FC.

== Honours ==
Flamengo (youth)

- Campeonato Carioca Sub-20: 2018, 2019
- Torneio Otávio Pinto Guimarães: 2018
