= Rady Panov =

Bulgarian Canadian actor (born 1993)

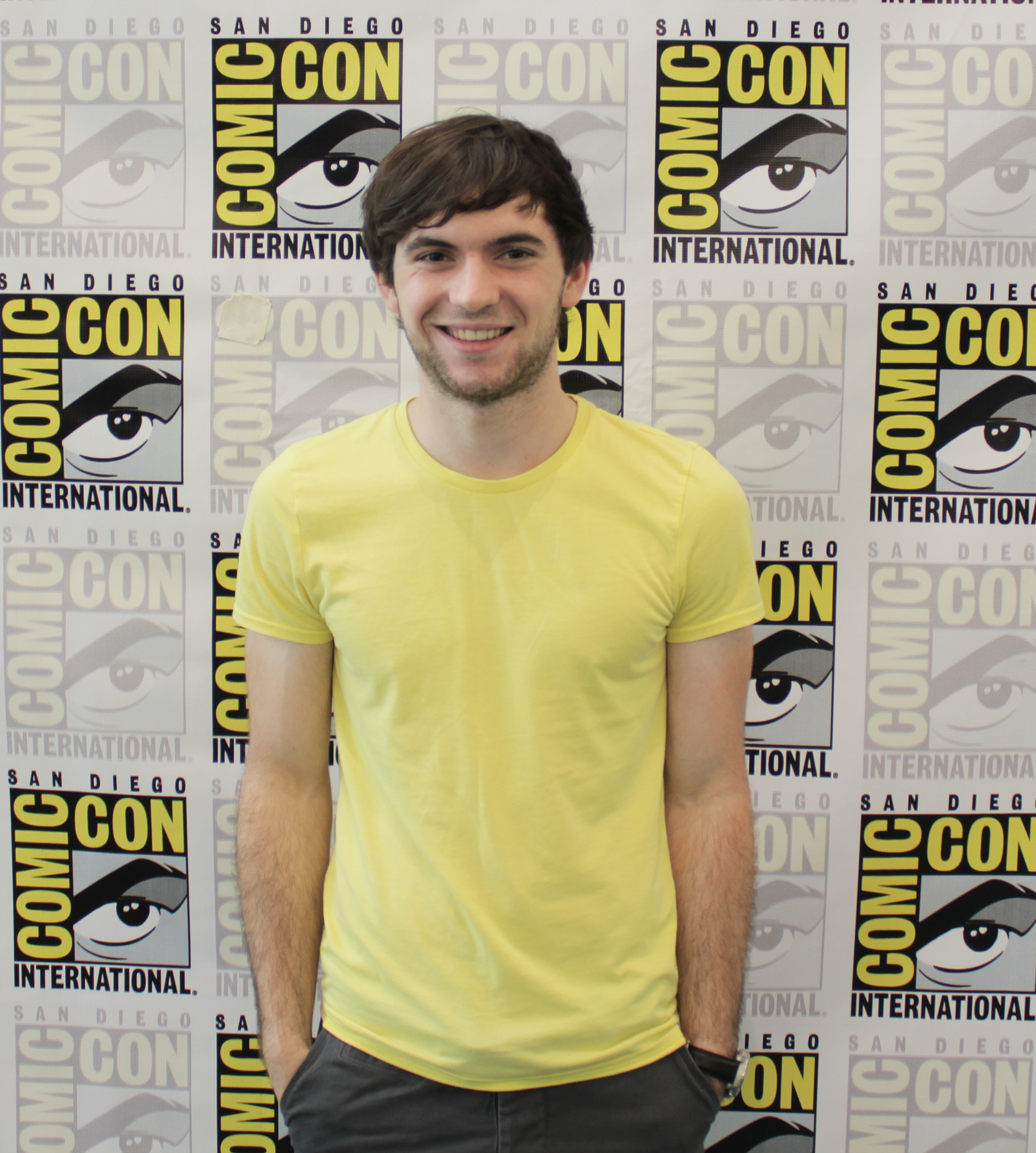
- Panov at San Diego Comic-Con in July 2013.
- Born: Radoslav Serafimov Panov; October 15, 1993 (age 32); Petrich, Bulgaria
- Occupation: Actor
- Years active: 2009–present

Radoslav Serafimov Panov (born October 15, 1993) is a Bulgarian Canadian actor best known for his role as Ferguson in the movie Girl in Progress. Panov has also appeared as Derek in the Lifetime movie Girl Fight.

== Life and career ==
Rady Panov was born in Petrich, Bulgaria on October 15, 1993.

Since then, he has worked on major film and TV productions with companies such as Lions Gate Entertainment and Lifetime.

Rady has appeared in movies with Eva Mendes (Hitch), Matthew Modine (The Dark Knight Rises), and Russel Peters (Comedy Now!). He has played alongside Anne Heche (Donnie Brasco), Jodelle Ferland (The Twilight Saga), Cierra Ramirez (The Fosters), and Raini Rodriguez (Austin & Ally).

Rady Panov has trained with popular casting directors in Vancouver, including Candice Elzinga (Psych), Jackie Lind (R. L. Stine's The Haunting Hour: The Series), and Judy Lee (2012). Other training includes veteran casting directors and teachers Sid Kozak (It) and Carol Kelsay (Stargate SG-1). Rady currently attends scene study workshops with teacher June B. Wilde (The Butterfly Effect).

He most recently appeared in Girl Fight (Director: Stephen Gyllenhaal), and Girl in Progress, (Director: Patricia Riggen).

When he is not acting, Rady Panov is a self-taught magician and film editor. His interest for magic arose when he first saw Criss Angel on television; what drew him in was that he was able to figure out some of the magic tricks. Rady views editing as a great way to further understand the ways in which movies are structured and ultimately come together. Rady is also an avid photographer and loves shooting in Vancouver.

Rady is looking forward to working on local TV series and is fond of the idea of working with director Guy Normal Bee (Supernatural), and executive producer Julie Plec (The Tomorrow People).

== Filmography ==
Year	Title	Role	Note
2010	Craven	Kyle	Short
2011	Brother's Keeper	Adam	Short
2011	Girl Fight	Derek	TV movie
2012	Girl in Progress	Ferguson	Feature Film
2012	Ethan & Jenn	Darren	Short
2015	Operation: Central	Dusk	Short
