= Osama Jamil Ali =

Kurdish politician, writer, actor and director

- Born: December 23, 1965 (age 60); Erbil, Iraq
- Occupations: Politician, writer, actor, and director
- Political party: Kurdistan Islamic Union
- Parent: Jamil Ali (father)
- Relatives: Musab Jamil, Bukhari Jamil, Suhaib Jamil, Bilal Jamil (brothers)

Osama Jamil Ali (Kurdish: ئوسامە جەمیل عەلی; born December 23, 1965) is a Kurdish politician, writer, actor and director.

From 1994 to 2000, he was the director of Kurdistan Islamic Union's media wing. From 2010 to 2014, he was a member of the Iraqi parliament on the list of the Kurdistan Islamic Union. He has previously worked as an actor, writer and director. In 2002, he appeared in the television series Mami Alan as Mir Izin. Osama is the son of Jamil Ali, a well-known Islamic figure among Kurds.
