= Osama Al-Zain =

Palestinian filmmaker and writer

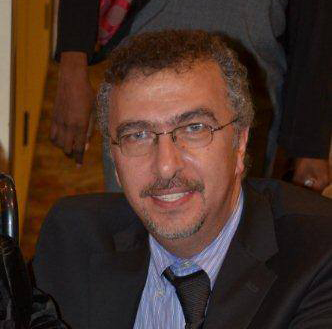
Osama Al-Zain أسامة الزين

Osama Al-Zain (Arabic: أسامة الزين) is a Palestinian filmmaker and writer. He received his undergraduate degree in Computer Engineering from the University of Jordan. After winning the Moris Sheer Award for short videos at The International Competition for Students Artist sponsored by Savannah College of Art and Design, he moved to the USA to pursue his graduate studies in film and video. He finished his Master's degree of Arts in Film and Video from the American University, in Washington DC.

Al-Zain has worked on documentaries about social and political issues. His credits include writing, producing, and directing shorts, documentaries, and public service announcements.

Transparency, a 2002 award-winning documentary, which he produced and directed, was screened in the US, Europe and the Middle East.

In 2005 Al-Zain released Palestine Post 9/11, a feature-length documentary which he produced and directed about the events of 9/11 from a Palestinian perspective.

The Dean العميدة-هيلين توماس, a 2014 two-part documentary mini series Al-Zain produced and directed about the life and career of the late journalist Helen Thomas.

In 2017 Al-Zain released Gamal Abd El-Nasser Revisited جمال عبد الناصر - زيارة جديدة, a seven-part biographical documentary series he produced and directed about the life and political journey of the Arab leader Gamal Abdel Nasser

Al-Zain lives in the States where he works as film producer/director. He's the CEO of IG-Creative-Group based in Washington DC.
