= Osama Abdusalam =

Libyan footballer (born 1983)

Personal information
- Date of birth: 23 February 1983 (age 43)
- Place of birth: Bayda, Libya
- Position: Midfielder

Senior career*
Years	Team	Apps	(Gls)
2004–2011	Al Akhdar		
2011–2013	Stade Nabeulien		
2013–2016	Al Akhdar		

International career^{‡}
2007–2011	Libya	4	(0)
- * Club domestic league appearances and goals as of 13 June 2018 ‡ National team caps and goals as of 13 June 2018

Osama Abdusalam (born 23 February 1983) is a Libyan former footballer.
