= 34th Street–Herald Square station =

New York City Subway station in Manhattan

34 Street–Herald Square
- New York City Subway station complex
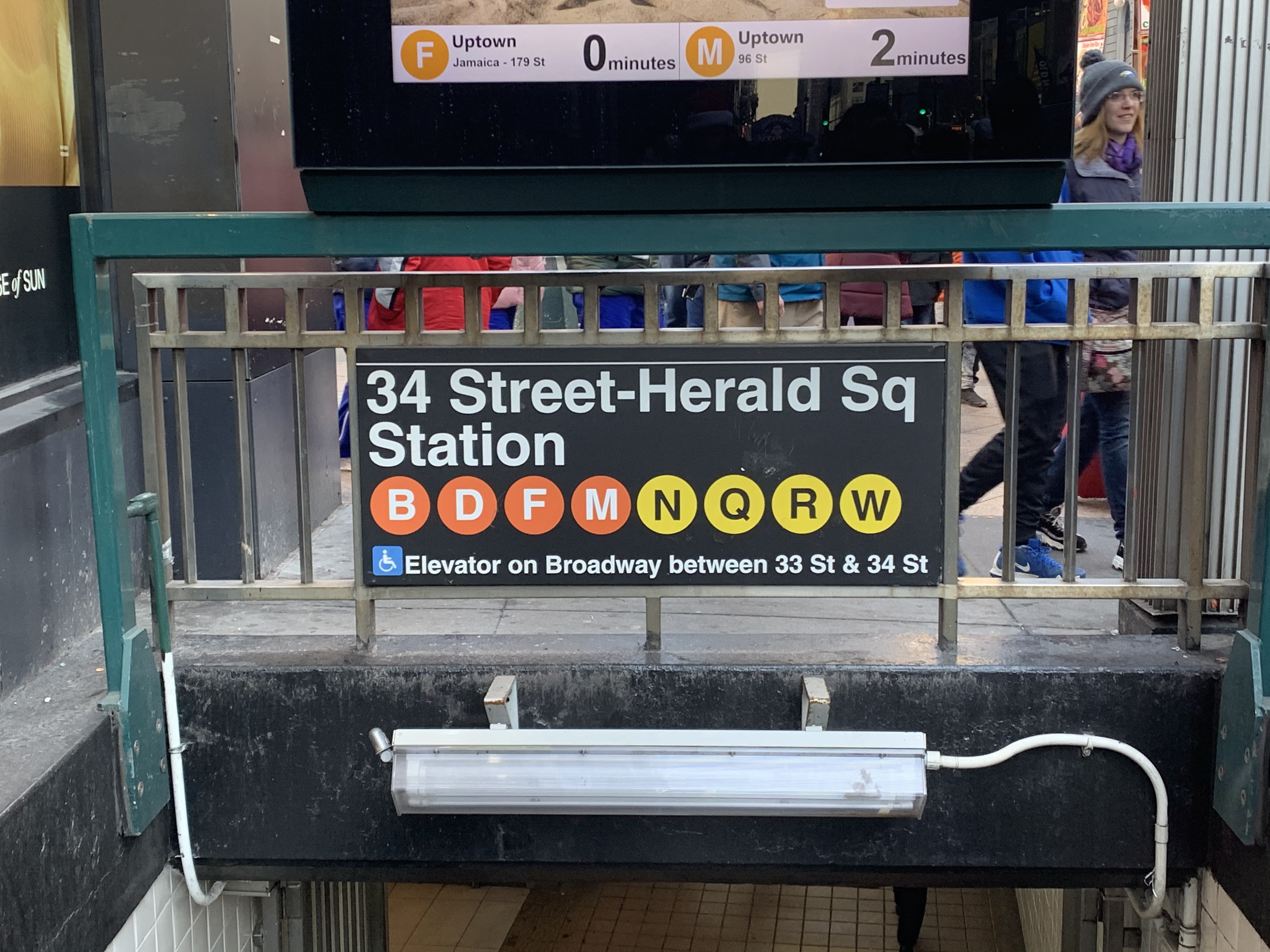
- The station entrance as seen in 2019

Station statistics
- Address: Intersection of West 34th Street, Broadway & Sixth Avenue; New York, New York
- Borough: Manhattan
- Locale: Herald Square, Midtown Manhattan
- Coordinates: 40.749338°N 73.987985°W
- Division: B (BMT/IND)
- Line: IND Sixth Avenue Line; BMT Broadway Line
- Services: B (weekdays during the day); D (all times); F (all times) <F> (two rush hour trains, peak direction); M (weekdays during the day); N (all times); Q (all times); R (all except late nights); W (weekdays only)
- Transit: NYCT Bus: M4, M5, M7, M34 SBS, M34A SBS, M55, SIM1C, SIM3, SIM3C, SIM10, SIM23, SIM24; MTA Bus: Q32, BxM2, QM1, QM2, QM4, QM5, QM6, QM10, QM11, QM12, QM15, QM16, QM17, QM18, QM20, QM24; PATH: JSQ–33, HOB–33, JSQ–33 (via HOB) (at 33rd Street); Amtrak, LIRR, NJT Rail (at Penn Station)
- Structure: Underground
- Levels: 2

Other information
- Opened: July 1, 1948; 78 years ago
- Accessible: Yes

Traffic
- 2025: 26,328,230 ▲5.6%
- Rank: 3 out of 423
Location
Location within New York City Subway
Location within New York City
Location within New York
Street map
Station service legend
Symbol	Description
Stops all times except late nights	Stops all times except late nights
Stops all times	Stops all times
Stops weekdays during the day	Stops weekdays during the day
Stops rush hours in the peak direction only (limited service)	Stops rush hours in the peak direction only (limited service)

The 34th Street–Herald Square station (also signed as 34th Street) is an underground station complex on the BMT Broadway Line and the IND Sixth Avenue Line of the New York City Subway. It is located at Herald Square in Midtown Manhattan where 34th Street, Broadway and Sixth Avenue (Avenue of the Americas) intersect, and is served by the D, F, N, and Q trains at all times; the R train at all times except late nights; the B, M, and W trains on weekdays; and the <F> train during rush hours in the peak direction.

The Broadway Line platforms opened on January 5, 1918, as part of the Broadway Line, which was built for the Brooklyn–Manhattan Transit Corporation (BMT) as part of the Dual Contracts. The Sixth Avenue Line platforms opened in 1940, completing construction of the first phase of the Independent Subway System (IND). The IND platforms functioned as a terminal for some trains until 1968, when the Chrystie Street Connection opened. The station complex was renovated in the 1990s.

The BMT and IND stations both have two island platforms and four tracks, and there is a mezzanine above both sets of platforms. The station complex contains elevators, which make it compliant with the Americans with Disabilities Act of 1990. There is an out-of-system connection to the PATH's 33rd Street station, as well as closed passageways to the adjacent 42nd Street–Bryant Park station and to 34th Street–Penn Station on the IRT Broadway–Seventh Avenue Line. The 34th Street–Herald Square station is the third-busiest station in the system as of 2019, with over 39 million passengers entering the station that year.

== History ==
=== Dual Contracts ===
The New York Public Service Commission adopted plans for what was known as the Broadway–Lexington Avenue route (later the Broadway Line) on December 31, 1907. A proposed Tri-borough system was adopted in early 1908, incorporating the Broadway Line. Operation of the line was assigned to the Brooklyn Rapid Transit Company (BRT; after 1923, the Brooklyn–Manhattan Transit Corporation or BMT) in the Dual Contracts, adopted on March 4, 1913. The Public Service Commission approved plans for the segment between 26th and 38th Streets, including the 28th Street and 34th Street stations, in April 1914. The contract for that section went to the second-lowest bidder, the United States Realty and Construction Company, as the lowest bidder was too inexperienced. U.S. Realty began constructing the tunnel between 26th and 38th Streets in August 1914. A. W. King was hired to install finishes in the 34th Street station in July 1917.

The Broadway Line opened between 14th Street–Union Square and Canal Street in 1917; it originally only served local trains. On January 5, 1918, the Broadway Line was extended north to Times Square–42nd Street and south to Rector Street, and express service started on the line. Before the 34th Street station had officially opened, Women's Wear Daily reported that the stop would be "one of the most important subway stations in the world", as it would lead directly to three busy crosstown streets (32nd, 33rd, and 34th Streets).

=== IND expansion ===
New York City mayor John Francis Hylan's original plans for the Independent Subway System (IND), proposed in 1922, included building over 100 miles (160 km) of new lines and taking over nearly 100 miles (160 km) of existing lines. The lines were designed to compete with the existing underground, surface, and elevated lines operated by the Interborough Rapid Transit Company (IRT) and Brooklyn–Manhattan Transit Corporation (BMT). The IND Sixth Avenue Line was designed to replace the elevated IRT Sixth Avenue Line. In 1924, the IND submitted its list of proposed subway routes to the New York City Board of Transportation (NYCBOT), which approved the program. One of the routes was a segment of tunnel from Fourth Street to 53rd Street. Part of this stretch was already occupied by the Hudson & Manhattan Railroad (H&M)'s Uptown Hudson Tubes. As a result, negotiations between the city and the H&M continued for several years. The IND and H&M finally came to an agreement in 1930. The city had decided to build the IND Sixth Avenue Line's local tracks around the pre-existing H&M tubes, and add express tracks for the IND underneath the H&M tubes at a later date. The IND started advertising bids for the section of the Sixth Avenue Line between 43rd and 53rd Streets in April 1931.

In April 1935, engineers started planning in earnest for the Midtown portion of the Sixth Avenue Line. The city government issued corporate stock to pay for the $53 million cost of the project, since the line was not eligible for federal Public Works Administration funds. The first contract, for the section between 40th and 47th Streets, was awarded to Rosoff-Brader Construction in October 1935. Mayor Fiorello H. La Guardia broke ground for the Sixth Avenue subway at Bryant Park on March 23, 1936. The Carleton Company was hired in September 1936 to construct the section from 27th to 33rd Streets, and Rosoff-Brader was hired that October to build the segment from 33rd to 40th Streets.

The line was built as a four-track tunnel north of 33rd Street, but there were only two tracks south of that street. The work largely involved cut-and-cover excavations, although portions of the subway had to be tunneled through solid rock. The builders also had to avoid disrupting the Sixth Avenue elevated or the various utility lines on the avenue. The line had to be built below the H&M and BMT tunnels, but it also had to pass above the East River Tubes at 32nd and 33rd Streets. Excavation work was conducted 24 hours a day, with most of the blasting work being conducted at night. Workers had to use small charges of dynamite to avoid damaging nearby buildings or the parallel Catskill Aqueduct. The section north of 33rd Street had mostly been excavated by November 1937. The H&M's old 33rd Street terminal closed on December 26, 1937, and a rebuilt terminal opened on September 24, 1939. The IRT's Sixth Avenue elevated closed in December 1938, just before the Sixth Avenue subway was completed. Otis Elevator received a contract to install 16 escalators at the station.

The IND's 34th Street–Herald Square station opened on December 15, 1940, as part of the opening of the IND Sixth Avenue Line from 47th–50th Streets–Rockefeller Center to West Fourth Street. The opening of the Sixth Avenue Line relieved train traffic on the Eighth Avenue Line, which was used by all services except for the G Brooklyn–Queens Crosstown service. The line was initially served by the rush-hour BB, the D, and the F; the BB and D terminated at 34th Street.

=== 1950s to 1990s ===
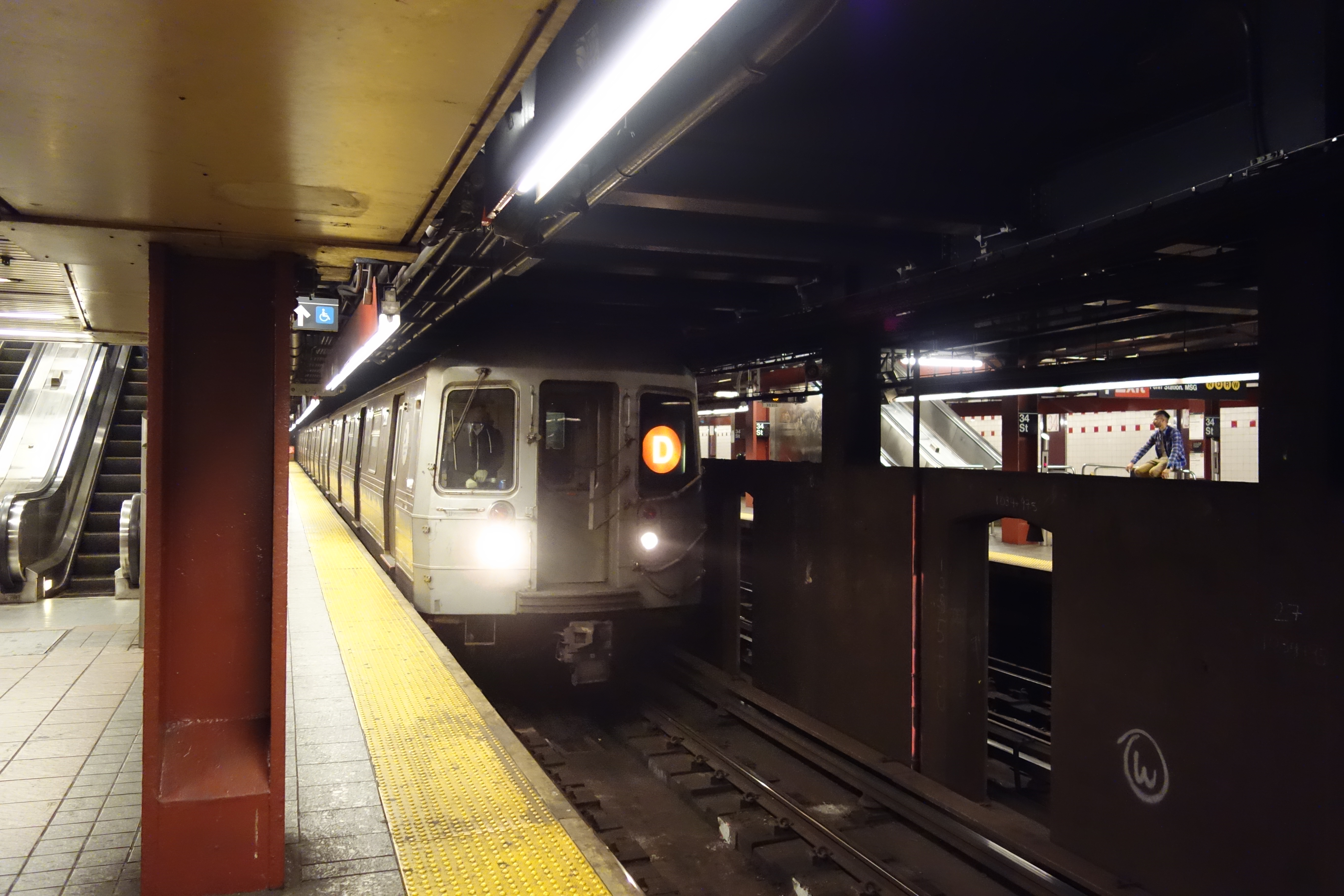
In 1967, the express tracks at the Sixth Avenue Line's 34th Street station were extended to West Fourth Street–Washington Square.

On April 19, 1961, ground was broken for a $22 million project to build two express tracks between the West Fourth Street and 34th Street–Herald Square stations. The express tracks were part of an $80 million subway improvement program that began with the reconstruction of the DeKalb Avenue station in Brooklyn. The project was part of the Chrystie Street Connection, which would allow 45 additional trains per hour, carrying a combined 90,000 passengers, to enter Manhattan during rush hours. On November 26, 1967, the first part of the Chrystie Street Connection opened and Sixth Avenue Line express tracks opened from 34th Street–Herald Square to West Fourth Street. With the opening of the connection to the Manhattan Bridge, BB service was renamed B and it was extended via the new express tracks and the connection to the BMT West End Line in Brooklyn. D service was routed via the connection and onto the BMT Brighton Line instead of via the Culver Line. It only ran express during rush hours. F service was extended from Broadway–Lafayette Street during rush hours, and from 34th Street during other times to Coney Island via the Culver Line.

On November 28, 1969, the turnstiles and exit gates at the northern end of the station were relocated, making four more staircases from the Broadway Line platforms available for transfers to the Sixth Avenue platforms. Previously, transfers could only be made from two staircases. This complex was overhauled in the late 1970s. The Transit Authority fixed the station's structure and renovated its appearance. The overhaul replaced the original wall tiles, old signs, and incandescent lighting to the 1970s modern look wall tile band and tablet mosaics, signs and fluorescent lights. It also fixed staircases and platform edges.

On February 9, 1983, the Metropolitan Transportation Authority (MTA) announced that it had awarded a $6.1 million contract to replace 16 escalators at the station to two companies.

In the early 1990s, the station received another major repair, which included an upgrade for ADA-accessibility and modernized wall tiling. The MTA repaired the staircases, re-tiling for the walls, installed new tiling on the floors, upgraded the station's lights and the public address system, installing ADA safety treads along the platform edge, new signs, and new track-beds in both directions. William Nicholas Bodouva & Associates, the renovation architects, also intended to streamline various passageways and ramps that had been added piecemeal over the years. The $66.4 million project was completed in 1996.

=== Since 2000 ===
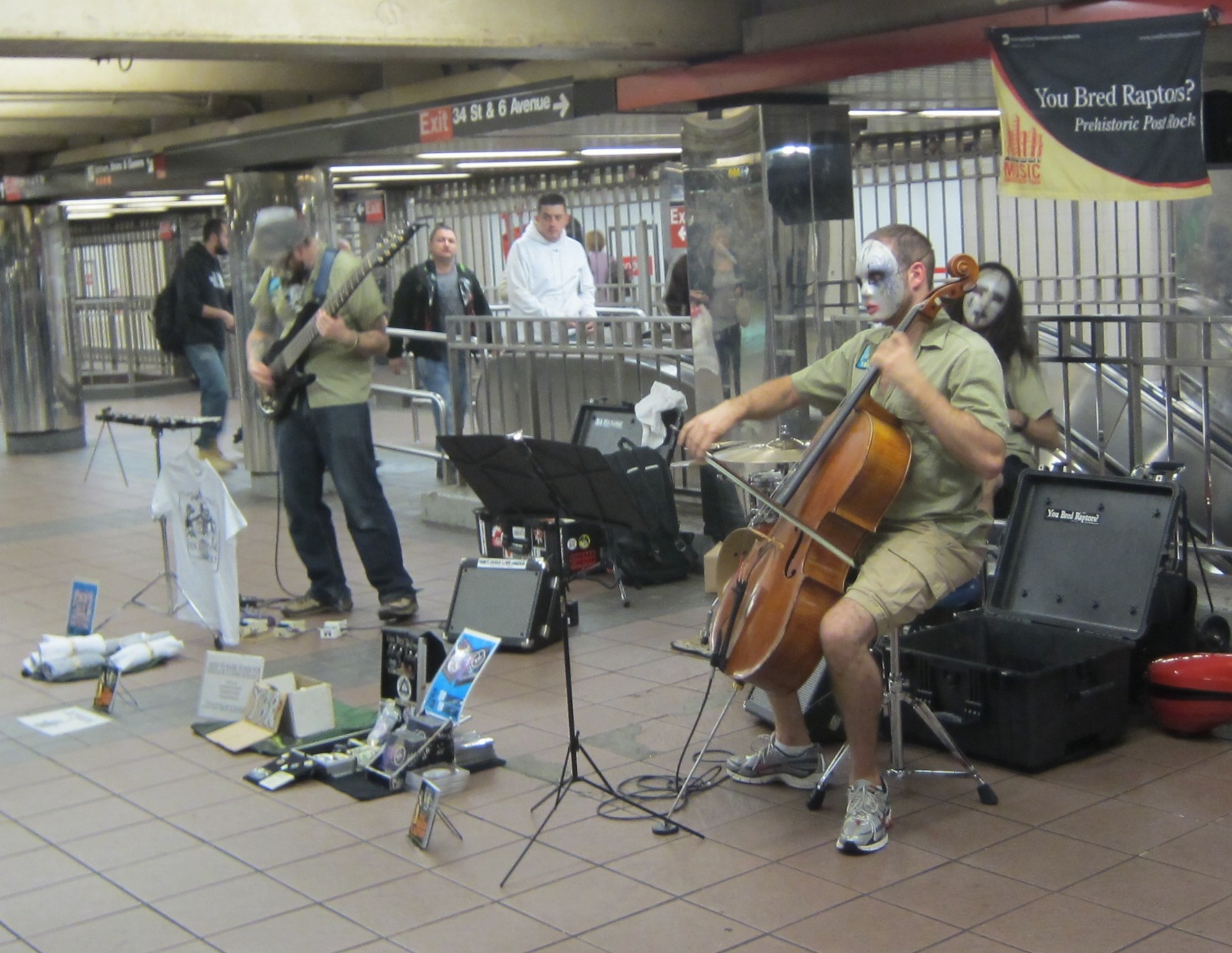
A music performance in the mezzanine

On August 28, 2004, Shahawar Matin Siraj and James Elshafay were arrested for planning to bomb the Herald Square station during the 2004 Republican National Convention. Elshafay cooperated with prosecutors and received a plea deal; Siraj was convicted of conspiracy on four counts, the most serious of which was plotting to bomb a public transportation system, in 2006 and was sentenced to 30 years in prison in 2007.

The station's token booths were shuttered in May 2005, after fare tokens were replaced with MetroCards; station agents were deployed elsewhere in the station to answer passengers' queries. This was part of a pilot program that was tested at seven other stations. To save energy, the MTA installed variable-speed escalators at 34th Street–Herald Square and three other subway stations in August 2008, although not all of the escalators initially functioned as intended. A Korean restaurant, Nōksu, opened on the station's mezzanine level in late 2023. In November 2024, the United States Department of Transportation provided a $72 million grant to cover two-thirds of the design and engineering phase of the renovation of New York Penn Station. Among other things, the project will include a direct connection from the 34th Street–Herald Square station to Penn Station.

== Station layout ==
This station complex has a long mezzanine above the platforms. Three staircases and two elevators lead to each of the two Broadway line platforms. Three pairs of escalators lead to the Sixth Avenue line platforms (two to the northbound one and one to the southbound one). There is a non-ADA-compliant ramp that leads to an intermediate level. This level has two sets of staircases leading to each of the Sixth Avenue platforms. The elevators to this level are at the north end of the mezzanine.

Two works of art are installed on the mezzanine as part of the MTA Arts & Design program. The first of these is Radiant Site by Michele Oka Doner, which consists of 11,000 gold-colored wall tiles. The tiles were manufactured at Pewabic Pottery in Michigan and installed along a 165-foot-long (50 m) stretch of passageway; according to Oka Doner, they were meant "to fill the underground with light and feeling". The second artwork is Halo by Nicholas Pearson and consists of seven orbs, each made of coiled aluminum rods and placed on small beams above the mezzanine. The MTA selected these artworks, along with David Provan's Yab-Yum sculpture above the IND platform, as part of the Herald Square Subway Complex Art Competition in 1988. Herbert Muschamp of The New York Times wrote of the artworks: "Unfortunately, though one feels like a subway vandal to say so, the plan's parts don't add up to an effective whole. A surfeit of mismatched design elements defeats the intended airiness."

33rd St to 34th St subway cross-section
11th Av	10th & 9th Avs are skipped	Farley Building & Moynihan Train Hall	8th Av	Madison Square; Garden	7th Av	Storefronts	6th Av & Broadway		5th & Madison Avs are skipped	Park Av
mezzanine	10th & 9th Avs are skipped	train hall	A/C/E	concourse	1/2/3	Former Gimbel's passageway	mezz	PATH	5th & Madison Avs are skipped	6/<6>
mezzanine	10th & 9th Avs are skipped	conc	mezzanine	concourse	mezzanine		N/Q/R/W		5th & Madison Avs are skipped
7/<7>	10th & 9th Avs are skipped	Penn Station (platform level)					B/D/F/<F>/M		5th & Madison Avs are skipped

=== Exits ===
At the north end of the primary mezzanine is the 35th Street exit, which contains a bank of turnstiles, token booth, and street stairs. Three staircases lead to all corners of Sixth Avenue and 35th Street except the southwest one. There is also a short passageway to either western corner of Broadway and 35th Street.

When the station was built, there were entrances at each of four corners of Broadway, Sixth Avenue, and 34th Street. Two stairs each led to the sidewalk outside Macy's Herald Square on the northwest corner; the Marbridge Building on the northeast corner; the Hotel McAlpin on the southeast corner; and Saks on the southwest corner. As of 2023, the primary mezzanine has connections with the two entrances at Broadway/Sixth Avenue and 34th Street. The entrance on the west side is staffed full-time and has two staircases to 34th Street. The northwest staircase has an entrance to an underground Burger King. There is a long passageway containing a single street elevator that leads to PATH at 33rd Street. The entrance on the east side of 34th Street is staffed part-time and when the token booth is closed, only two HEET turnstiles provide access to the mezzanine. This entrance has a passageway that connects to the 35th Street exit and has two pairs of exit-only turnstiles from the mezzanine.

Upon the station's opening, there were also four entrances at 32nd Street: three from the street and one from the PATH (then H&M) station. As of 2023, there is a separate mezzanine at the south end of the Sixth Avenue level that has two staircases leading to each platform. It is directly underneath the PATH station mezzanine (two levels from street level) and has a passageway leading to the entrance at Broadway and 32nd Street. Outside of fare control, there is an entrance leading directly to the two basement levels of J. C. Penney in the Manhattan Mall. There are also escalators that lead to the front entrance of the mall. The entrance at Broadway and 32nd Street is unstaffed, has two street stairs, and one stair to each of the two Broadway platforms on the very south end. There are street stairs to either northern corner of Broadway and 32nd Street, as well as to the northeast corner of 6th Avenue and 32nd Street. As of 2023, the northeastern entrance at 32nd Street and Broadway contains the Nōksu restaurant.

=== Passageways ===
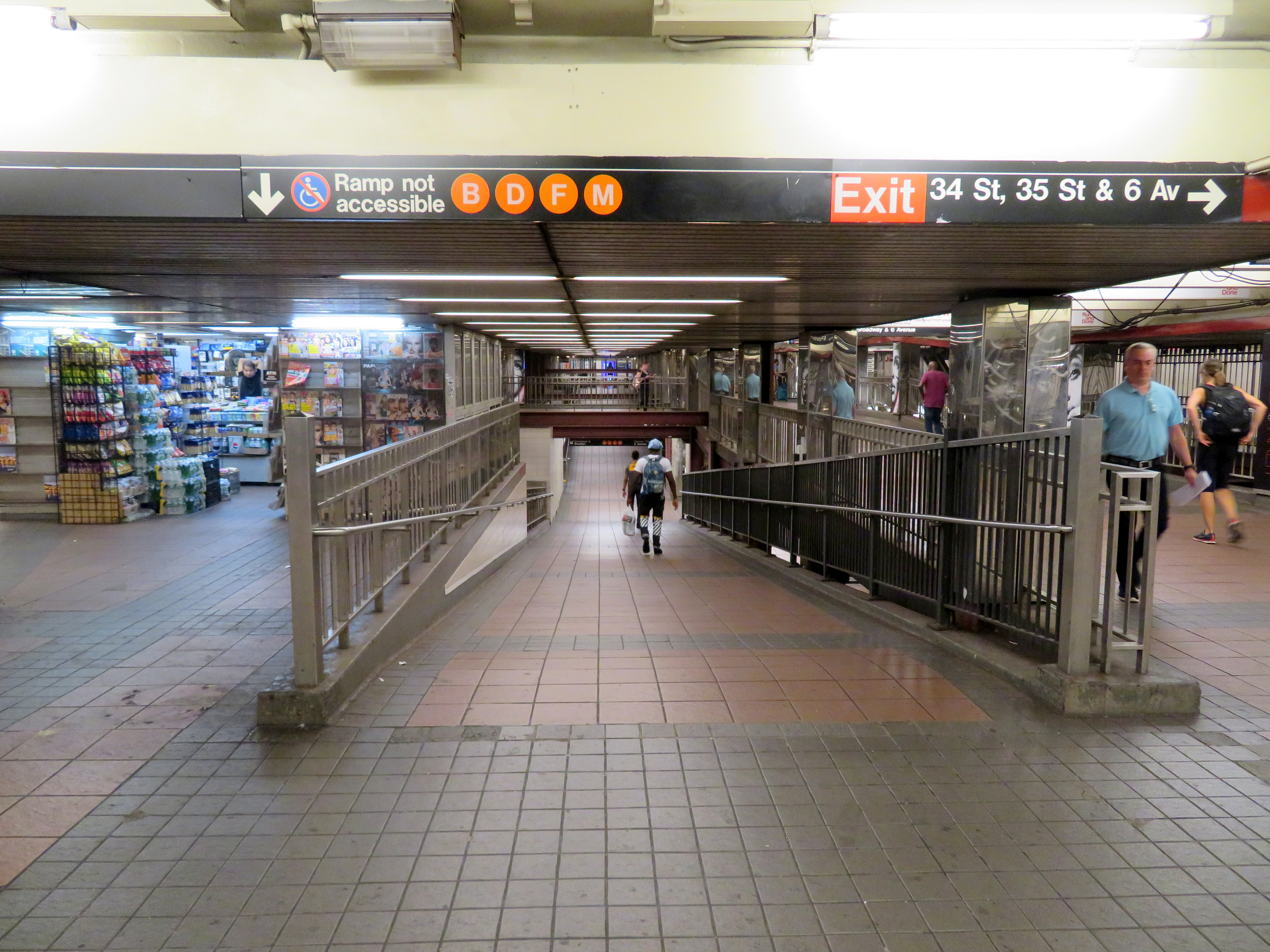
Passageways in the station for transfers between the IND and BMT platforms

There are closed passageways (but not free transfers) to the adjacent 42nd Street–Bryant Park station to the north and to 34th Street–Penn Station on the IRT Broadway–Seventh Avenue Line.

==== Gimbels passageway ====
There was once an out-of-system passageway under 33rd Street, which ran to Pennsylvania Station, one block west. The passageway was called the "Gimbels passageway" because it was next to the basements of the Gimbels department store and the Hotel Pennsylvania. The passageway was designed by McKim, Mead & White and constructed by the George A. Fuller Company. The Gimbels passageway opened on May 29, 1920, after one and a half years of construction. It measured 800 feet (240 m) long by 18 feet (5.5 m) wide. The south wall of the passageway originally contained 25 storefront windows, four entrances to the Gimbels store, and two entrances to the hotel. The north wall included 74 spaces for advertisements.

Over the years, the entrances to the Gimbels store and the Hotel Pennsylvania were closed. During the 1970s and 1980s, the New York City Subway had high rates of crime, as did the rest of the city; the passageway similarly experienced high crime rates. This passageway was closed in 1986, and passengers now must walk at street level to connect to the commuter railroads and Amtrak. A real estate developer, Vornado Realty Trust, proposed in 2010 to reopen the passageway as part of the development of the 15 Penn Plaza office tower.

==== Passageway to Bryant Park ====
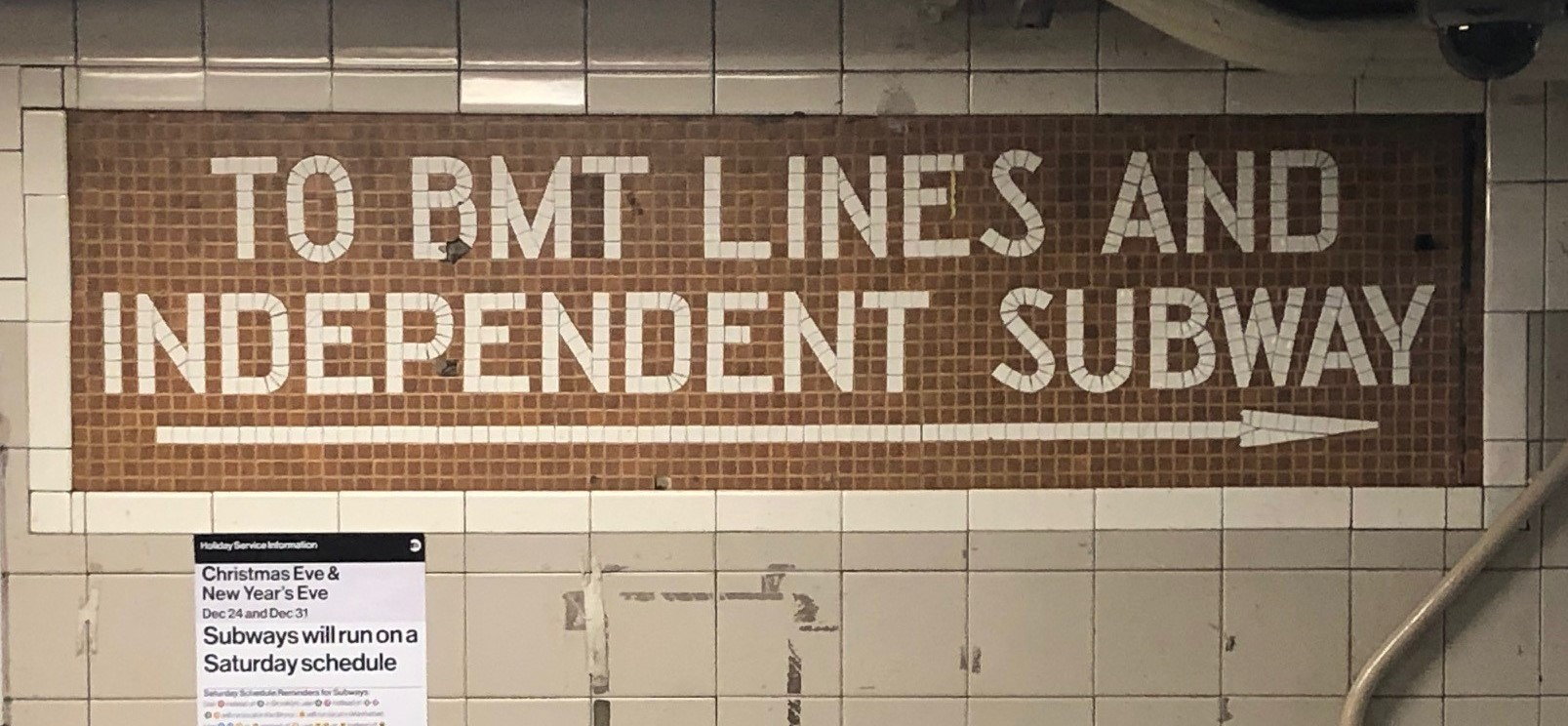
Restored tile sign displays direction to former BMT and IND platforms.

The IND station's mezzanine originally extended north from 34th Street to the 42nd Street station. Proposed by the Board of Transportation in 1936, the passageway was outside of fare control but was intended to relieve passenger flow at the 42nd and 34th Street stations. At both ends of the passageway, pedestrians could descend to turnstiles at platform level. The passageway itself measured 35 feet (11 m) wide and was very plain in design, with white-tiled walls. There were entrances at 34th, 35th, 38th, and 40th Streets. At 35th Street, there was a smaller passageway extending westward to Broadway, near the northern end of the BMT Broadway Line station at 34th Street–Herald Square. According to a 1940 report from the New York Herald Tribune, the passageway was believed to be "the longest of its kind in the world".

In the 1980s, the passageway became a gathering spot for homeless people and drug users. On March 20, 1991, a woman was raped behind a pile of debris in the subway passageway during rush hour, which had entrances at 38th Street. Other commuters passed nearby but were unaware of what was happening. That passageway was closed the day after; it was used by 400 daily riders and recorded 30 felonies since January 1, 1990. In response, on March 28, 1991, the NYCTA ordered the closing of the 15 most dangerous passageways in the system within a week, which the Transit Police and citizen advocacy groups had called for since the previous year. A woman was raped in the passageway in July 1990 with no response, but after another rape took place in August, the passageway's closure was called for by the local community board in September. Bureaucratic delays had prevented their closure, with their presentation to the MTA Board not scheduled until April 1991, after a public hearing on systemwide service reduction was to be held. The agency feared that closing the passageway without public comment would have caused an outcry for advocates for the homeless. The NYCTA's director of public information said that the agency had erred in waiting for formal approval. The locations were chosen based on crime volume, lighting, traffic and physical layout. These entrances were closed under the declaration of a public safety emergency, and were blocked off with plywood and fencing until public hearings were held and official permission was obtained.

== BMT Broadway Line platforms ==
34 Street–Herald Square
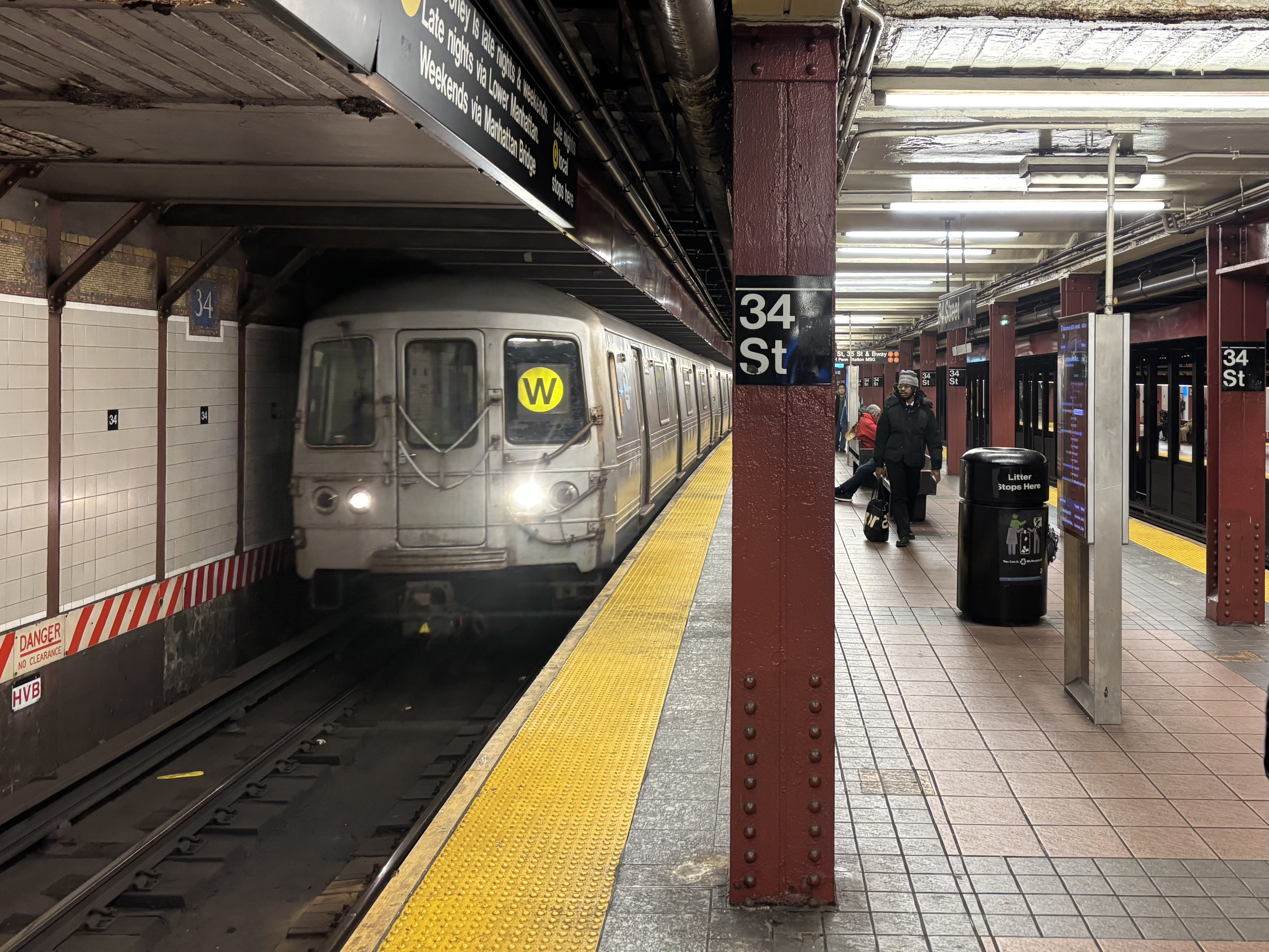
- R46 W train arriving at the southbound platform

Station statistics
- Division: B (BMT)
- Line: BMT Broadway Line
- Services: N (all times); Q (all times); R (all except late nights); W (weekdays only)
- Platforms: 2 island platforms cross-platform interchange
- Tracks: 4

Other information
- Opened: January 5, 1918; 108 years ago
- Accessible: Yes
Services
Preceding station	New York City Subway	Following station
Times Square–42nd Street N Q R W northbound	Express	14th Street–Union Square N Q via Canal Street
Times Square–42nd Street N Q R W northbound	Local	28th Street N Q R W via Whitehall Street–South Ferry
Track layout
Station service legend
Symbol	Description
Stops all times except late nights	Stops all times except late nights
Stops all times	Stops all times
Stops late nights only	Stops late nights only
Stops late nights and weekends	Stops late nights and weekends
Stops weekdays during the day	Stops weekdays during the day

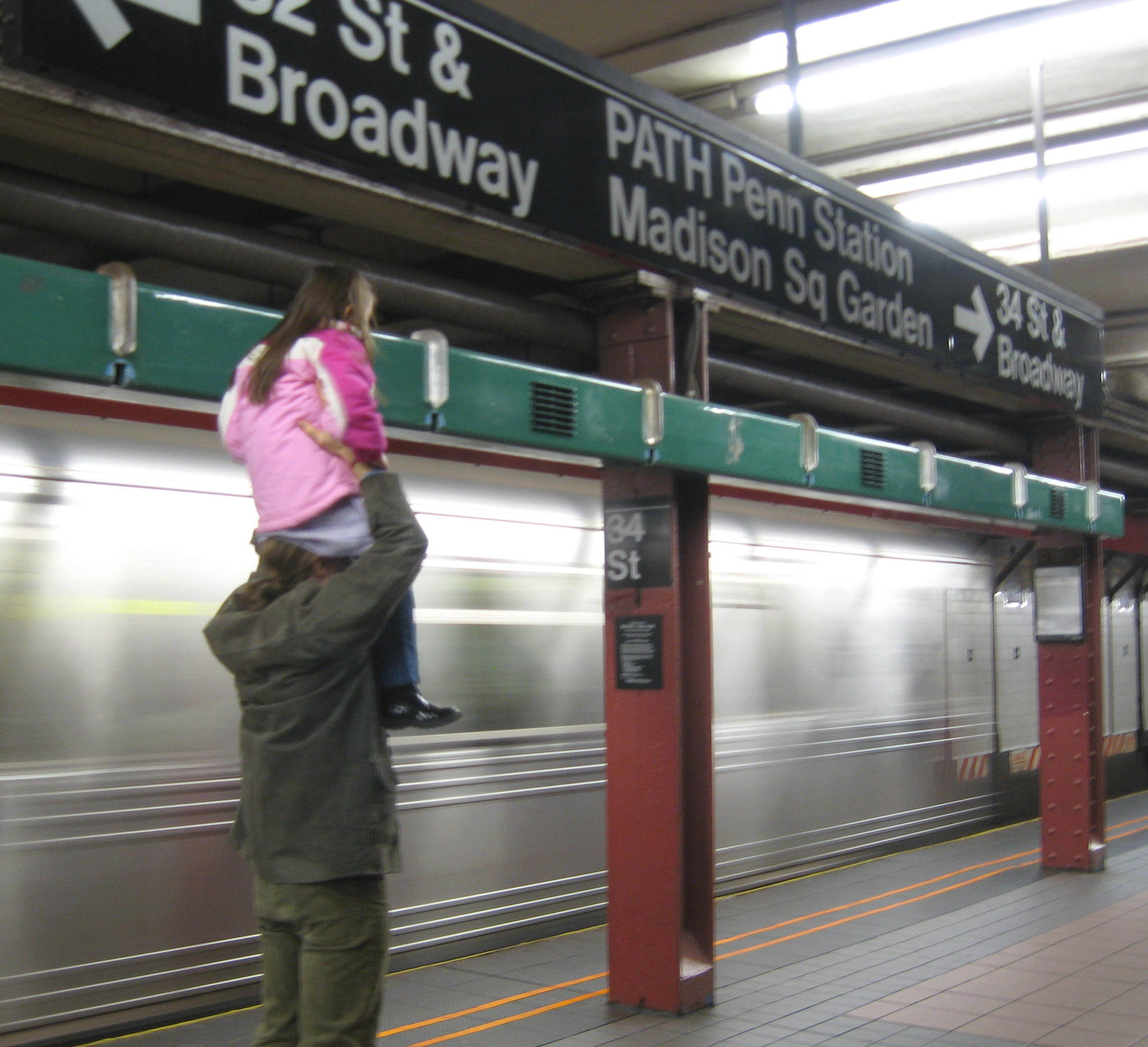
Girl using the REACH New York, An Urban Musical Instrument rack

The 34th Street–Herald Square station on the BMT Broadway Line is an express station that has four tracks and two island platforms. This level opened several years after the opening of the Port Authority Trans-Hudson station; the Sixth Avenue line platforms were built later. The station was operated by the BMT until the city government took over the BMT's operations on June 1, 1940. Each platform has three staircases and one elevator to the main mezzanine on the north half and another staircase at the extreme south end to 32nd Street.

The N and Q stop here at all times, the R stops here except at night, and the W stops here only on weekdays during the day. The R and W always run on the local tracks. The N runs on the express tracks only on weekdays during the day and on the local tracks at all other times. The Q runs on the express tracks during the day and on the local tracks during the night. The next stop to the north is Times Square–42nd Street for all service, while the next stop to the south is 28th Street for local trains and 14th Street–Union Square for express trains. North of the station are diamond crossovers in both directions that are used by N trains only on weekdays during the day when they operate express in Manhattan.

Because Queens-bound N trains switch from the express to the local track north of this station, trains are often held here until another train arrives on the opposite track. Depending on the schedule, they may not leave in the same order in which they arrived. This causes confusion among riders as they run back and forth on the northbound platform trying to catch the train that will leave first. This is also true at other stations where two services that run to the same destination stop at the same platform but do not stop on the same side of the platform. The New York Times calls this The Subway Shuffle.

In 1996, artist Christopher Janney installed "REACH New York, An Urban Musical Instrument". The piece consists of green racks with sensors, which hang along both platforms. Waving one's hands in front of the sensors creates a corresponding sound from the rack.

== IND Sixth Avenue Line platforms ==
34 Street–Herald Square
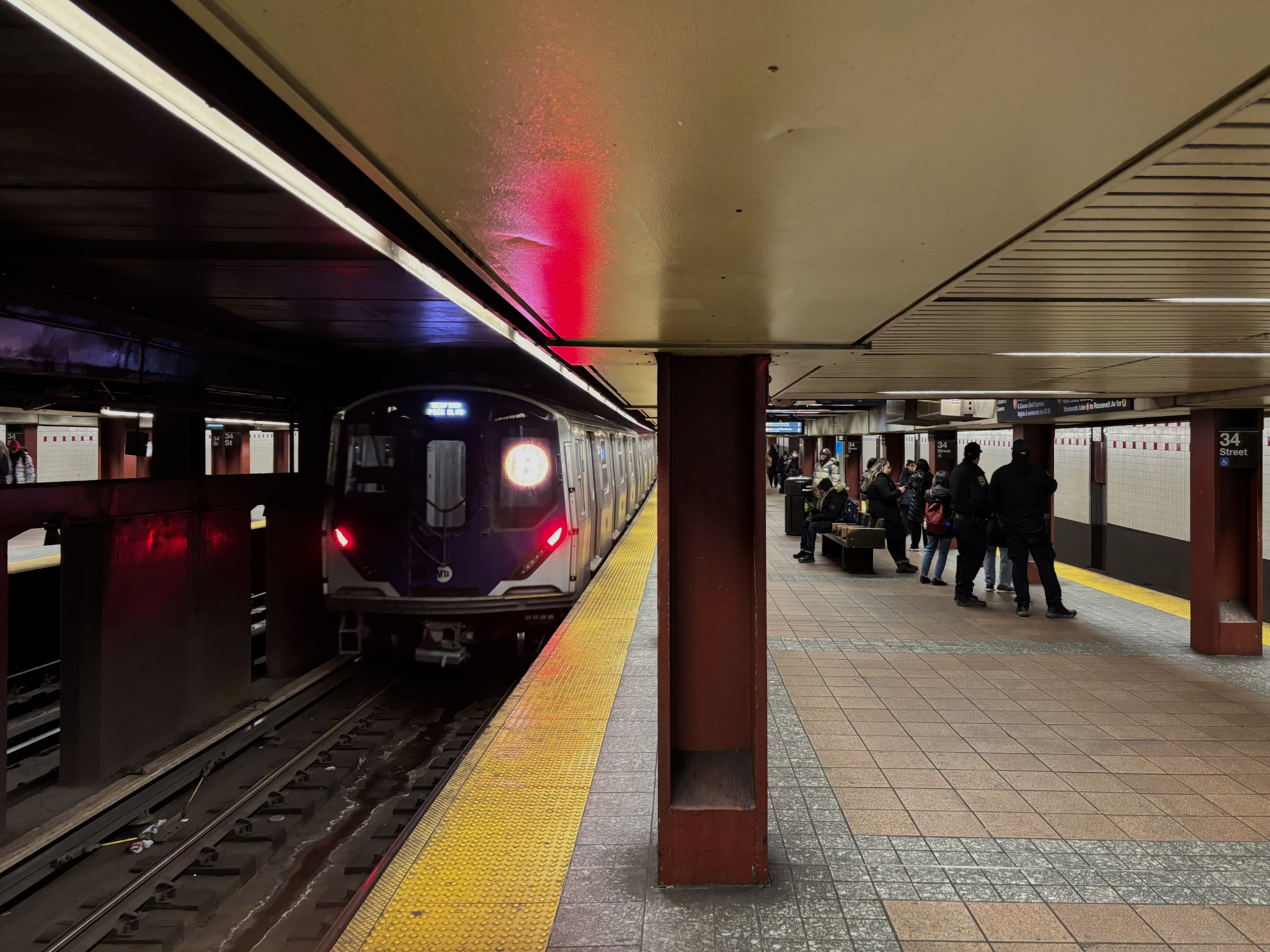
- R211A B train departing from the northbound platform

Station statistics
- Division: B (IND)
- Line: IND Sixth Avenue Line
- Services: B (weekdays during the day); D (all times); F (all times) <F> (two rush hour trains, peak direction); M (weekdays during the day)
- Platforms: 2 island platforms cross-platform interchange
- Tracks: 4

Other information
- Opened: December 15, 1940; 85 years ago
- Accessible: Yes
Services
Preceding station	New York City Subway	Following station
42nd Street–Bryant Park B D F <F> M via 47th–50th Streets–Rockefeller Center	Express	West Fourth Street–Washington Square B D via Grand Street
42nd Street–Bryant Park B D F <F> M via 47th–50th Streets–Rockefeller Center	Local	23rd Street F <F> M via Broadway–Lafayette Street
Former services
Preceding station	New York City Subway	Following station
42nd Street–Bryant Park toward 21st Street–Queensbridge	JFK Express	West Fourth Street–Washington Square toward Howard Beach–JFK Airport
Track layout
Station service legend
Symbol	Description
Stops all times	Stops all times
Stops all times except late nights	Stops all times except late nights
Stops weekdays during the day	Stops weekdays during the day
Stops rush hours in the peak direction only (limited service)	Stops rush hours in the peak direction only (limited service)

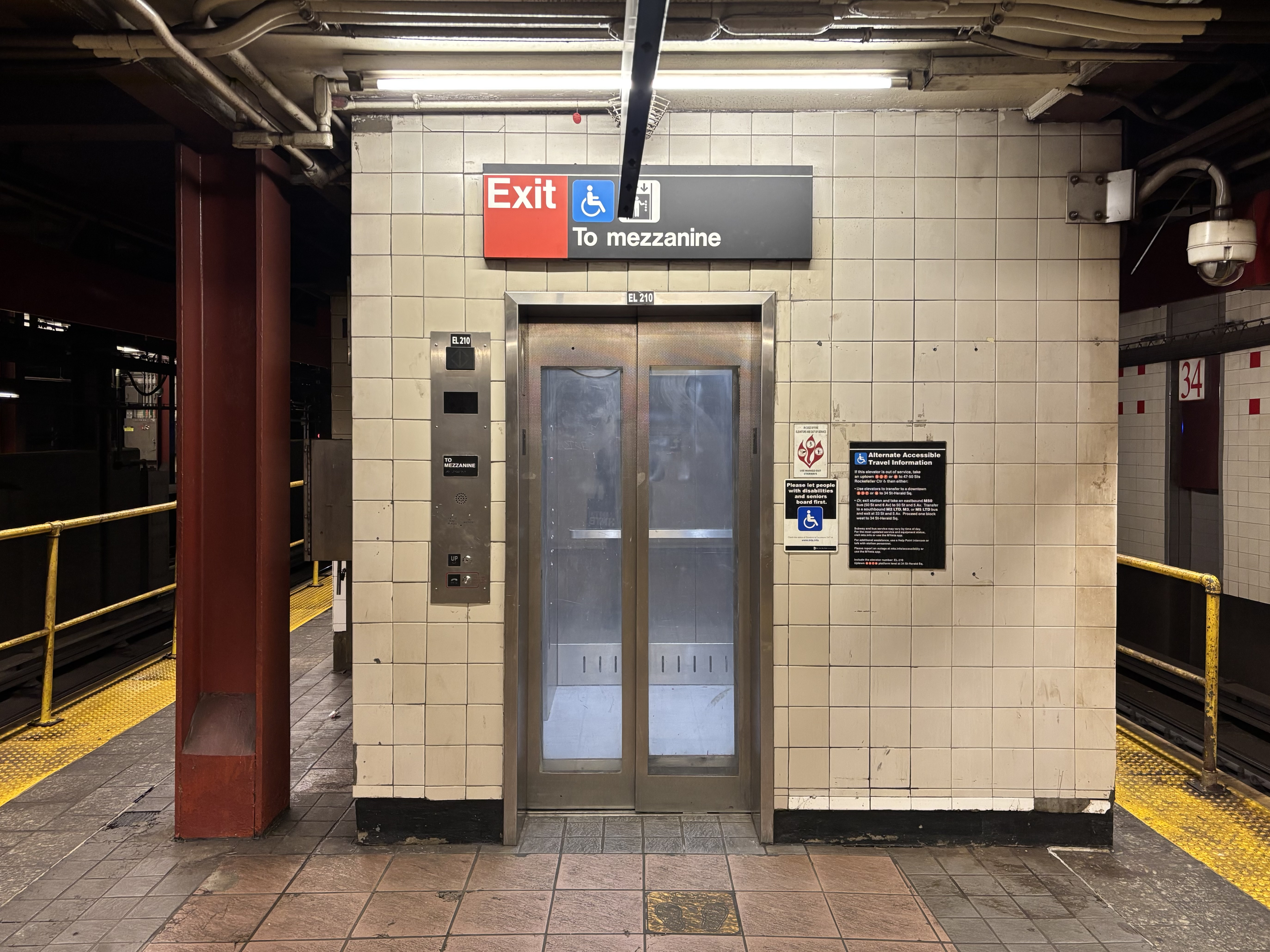
Elevator from the northbound platform

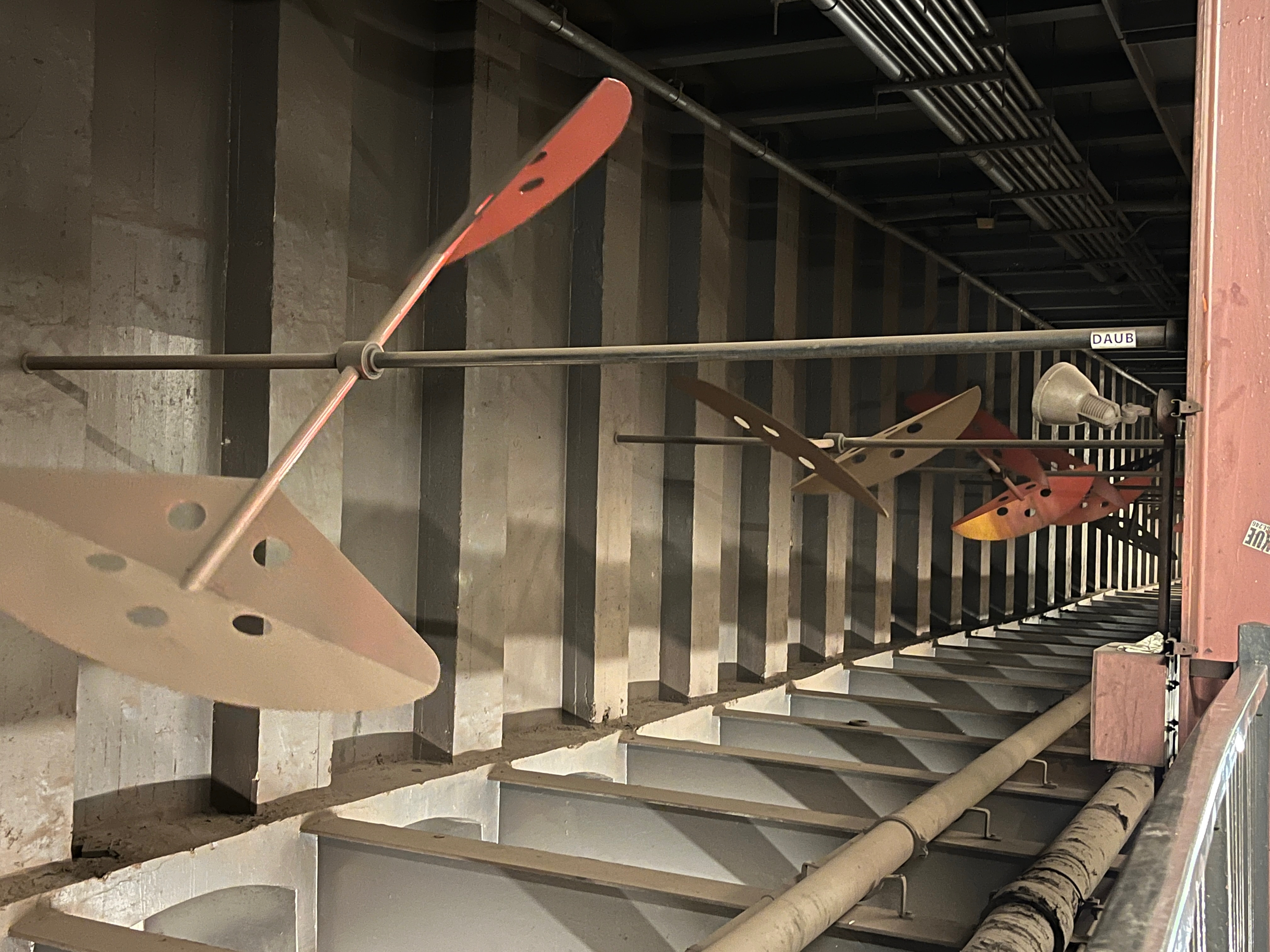
Yab-Yum sculpture

The 34th Street–Herald Square station on the IND Sixth Avenue Line is an express station that has four tracks and two island platforms. The D and F stop here at all times, while the B and M stop here only on weekdays during the day. The B and D run on the express tracks and the F and M run on the local tracks. The next stop to the north is 42nd Street–Bryant Park for all service, while the next stop to the south is 23rd Street for local trains and West Fourth Street–Washington Square for express trains.

The mezzanine elevators are at the north end of the station while the staircases to the Manhattan Mall entrance are at the south end. The platforms have numerous stairs and escalators leading to the main mezzanine. Stairs on both platforms lead to a non-accessible ramp leading to the mezzanine.

The platforms are not equal in length, as the northbound one is longer than the southbound one. North of this station are numerous crossovers and switches that allow trains from uptown to terminate here on the express tracks during construction and closures. The crossovers were reconfigured in 2018 to reduce the duplication of track switches of the downtown and uptown tracks, most notably, the switch from the express to local tracks.

Above the northbound local tracks is Yab-Yum, a sculpture created by David Provan in 1992. It consists of fourteen paddles, each measuring 12 feet (3.7 m), which are painted red to match the colors of the columns on the platform. Whenever a train arrived or departed, it would create wind gusts that caused the paddles to spin. By 2012, the propellers were no longer capable of spinning.

== Notable places nearby ==
- Empire State Building, one block east of the 34th Street entrances
- Manhattan Mall, in which the 32nd Street entrance is located
- Herald Square, directly in between the 34th Street entrances
- Macy's Herald Square, near the northwestern entrance at 34th Street
- Penn Station and Madison Square Garden, both one block west of the 32nd Street entrance
