= Osama El-Rady =

Osama El-Rady (Arabic: أسامة الراضي; 1930 – October 30, 2005) has been called the founding father of modern psychiatry in Saudi Arabia.

El-Rady was born in Mecca and educated in Cairo, before receiving an MD degree from Ain Shams University, then pursued Western-style psychiatric training in Beirut under World Health Organization auspices in 1965. At that time, the kingdom's approach to people with severe and persistent mental illness was overwhelmingly custodial. Appointed director of Shehar Mental Hospital in Taif, Dr. El-Rady undertook to organize formal treatment programs. He expanded this campaign when given charge of all psychiatric units in Saudi Arabia in the early 1970s, opening outpatient psychiatric clinics.

El-Rady strongly advocated adapting Western psychiatric approaches to Islamic tradition and culture. Together with Dr. Gamal Abou El-Azayem and Prof. Rasheed Chaudry he helped found the World Islamic Association for Mental Health (WIAMH) and became its first president.
