= 23rd Street station =

23rd Street station may refer to:

== New York City ==
- 23rd Street–Baruch College station, a subway station at Park Avenue South (4th Avenue) in Manhattan
- 23rd Street station (BMT Broadway Line), a subway station at Broadway and Fifth Avenue in Manhattan
- 23rd Street station (IND Sixth Avenue Line), a subway station at Sixth Avenue (Avenue of the Americas) in Manhattan
  - 23rd Street station (PATH), a subway station located within the IND Sixth Avenue Line station
- 23rd Street station (IRT Broadway–Seventh Avenue Line), a subway station at Seventh Avenue in Manhattan
- 23rd Street station (IND Eighth Avenue Line), a subway station at Eighth Avenue in Manhattan
- Court Square–23rd Street station, a subway station near One Court Square in Long Island City, Queens

=== Demolished Stations ===
- 23rd Street station (IRT Second Avenue Line), a demolished elevated station at Second Avenue in Manhattan
- 23rd Street station (IRT Third Avenue Line), a demolished elevated station at Third Avenue in Manhattan
- 23rd Street station (IRT Sixth Avenue Line), a demolished elevated station at Sixth Avenue in Manhattan
- 23rd Street station (IRT Ninth Avenue Line), a demolished elevated station at Ninth Avenue in Manhattan

== California ==
- 23rd Street station (Muni Metro), a light rail station in San Francisco
- 23rd Street station (Sacramento), a light rail station in Sacramento
- LATTC/Ortho Institute station (formerly 23rd Street), a light rail station in Los Angeles

== Illinois ==
- McCormick Place station (formerly 23rd Street station), a commuter rail station in Chicago

== See also ==
- 23rd Street (disambiguation)
