= Keith Godard =

British born graphic artist and designer

Keith Godard (31 May 1938 – 4 May 2020) was a British-born graphic artist and designer who practiced in New York City. He was the principal artist at StudioWorks.

== Early life and education ==
Godard was born in London during World War II. His father was a heraldic engraver. In 1951, his father took him to the Festival of Britain which exposed him to 1950s modern design by the work of FHK Henrion, Abram Games, James Gardiner and the architecture of the 'Dome of Discovery' and the 'Skylon'. He studied at and graduated from the London College of Printing and Graphic Art in 1962 and continued his studies on a full scholarship from the London County Council for a MFA majoring in graphic design at Yale University School of Art and Architecture in 1967.

== Professional career ==
His first employment was with George Him, a Polish designer and illustrator. He then worked for Town Magazine where he was responsible for typographic layouts. He briefly worked for The Weekend Telegraph Magazine from 1964 to 1965, before going to Graduate School at Yale University. After graduation, Godard worked at Fortune magazine for six months.

Godard, with Craig Hodgetts, Bob Mangurian and Lester Walker, formed Works design Group in 1968. Their first design was the Creative Playthings store. Godard designed the graphics component.

From 1975 to 1985 he worked with new partners, Hans van Dijk and Stephanie Tevonian. During that tenure he designed in collaboration with Edwin Schlossberg the Macomber Farm outdoor exhibit, The Brooklyn Bridge Centennial Exhibition, The US Custom House Pavilion, 'In the Picture' for the Jewish Museum, aspects of The P.T. Barnum Museum exhibits, Manhattan Children's Museum installation 'Children's Art from Armenia', and four traveling exhibits for United Nations Agencies.

In 1986 Godard established Studio Works where he was the principal designer, specializing in exhibition design, wayfinding and public art. He designed and built the exhibition 'Steel, Stone and Backbone, Building NYC Subways 1900–1925' for the Brooklyn Transit Museum, and signage systems and banners for Lincoln Center and signage for Cornell University Performing Arts Center for architect James Stirling. He designed Memories of Twenty-Third Street, a mosaic mural for the MTA's Arts for Transit installed in 23rd Street subway station on the R line in 2003.

From 2000 until 2009 he designed a series of die-cut architecture lecture posters for the School of Architecture at the University of Virginia at Charlottesville. In 2015 he designed scannable graphics for apps in print and mural forms.

== Exhibitions ==
- 'Image of the Studio' group exhibition Cooper Union Art Gallery 2014
- 'Unfolding Keith Godard' The 0-0-0-art-space Hangzhou P.R. China, 2011
- Nanjing University School of Design P.R. China, 2012
- 'Le Périgord et New York en Images' Le Musée des Bastides, Monpazier, France, 2008
- Les Musées des Belvès, France, 2009, 2012
- 'This Way That Way': a retrospective of work 1963-2003' Rosenwald-Wolff Gallery, Philadelphia, 2004
- Cooper Union School of Art Gallery, 2005
- 'Images of an Era: The American Poster 1945-75' The Corcoran Gallery, Washington 1976
- Collection of work in The Museum of Modern Art, Le Bibliothèque Nationale, Paris,
- The Cooper-Hewitt Museum, Smithsonian Institution, The Cooper Union
- National Archives in Washington DC

== Publications including his work ==
- This Way -- That Way Lars Muller Publishers ISBN 3-907078-63-2
- Design Firms Open For Business Steve Heller /Lita Talarico ISBN 1581159307
- All Men Are Brothers Published by Hesign, China 2006 ISBN 3-9810544-0-7
- Signs and Spaces Publisher: Rockport Publishers, 1994
  - "Keith Godard" by Laetitia Costes, in graphé Bulletin de l’association pour la promotion de l’art typographique No 59, July 2014, pages 8 – 15
