= 23rd Street =

23rd Street may refer to:

== Cuba ==
- 23rd St. or Calle 23, a busy street at the heart of Vedado, Havana

== United States ==
- 23rd Street (Manhattan), a street in New York City
- 23rd Street (Richmond, California), a street in Richmond, California.
- 23rd Street Grounds, a former Chicago, Illinois baseball park used during the late 19th century

== See also ==
- 23rd Street station (disambiguation)
