= 23rd Street–Baruch College station =

New York City Subway station in Manhattan

23 Street–Baruch College
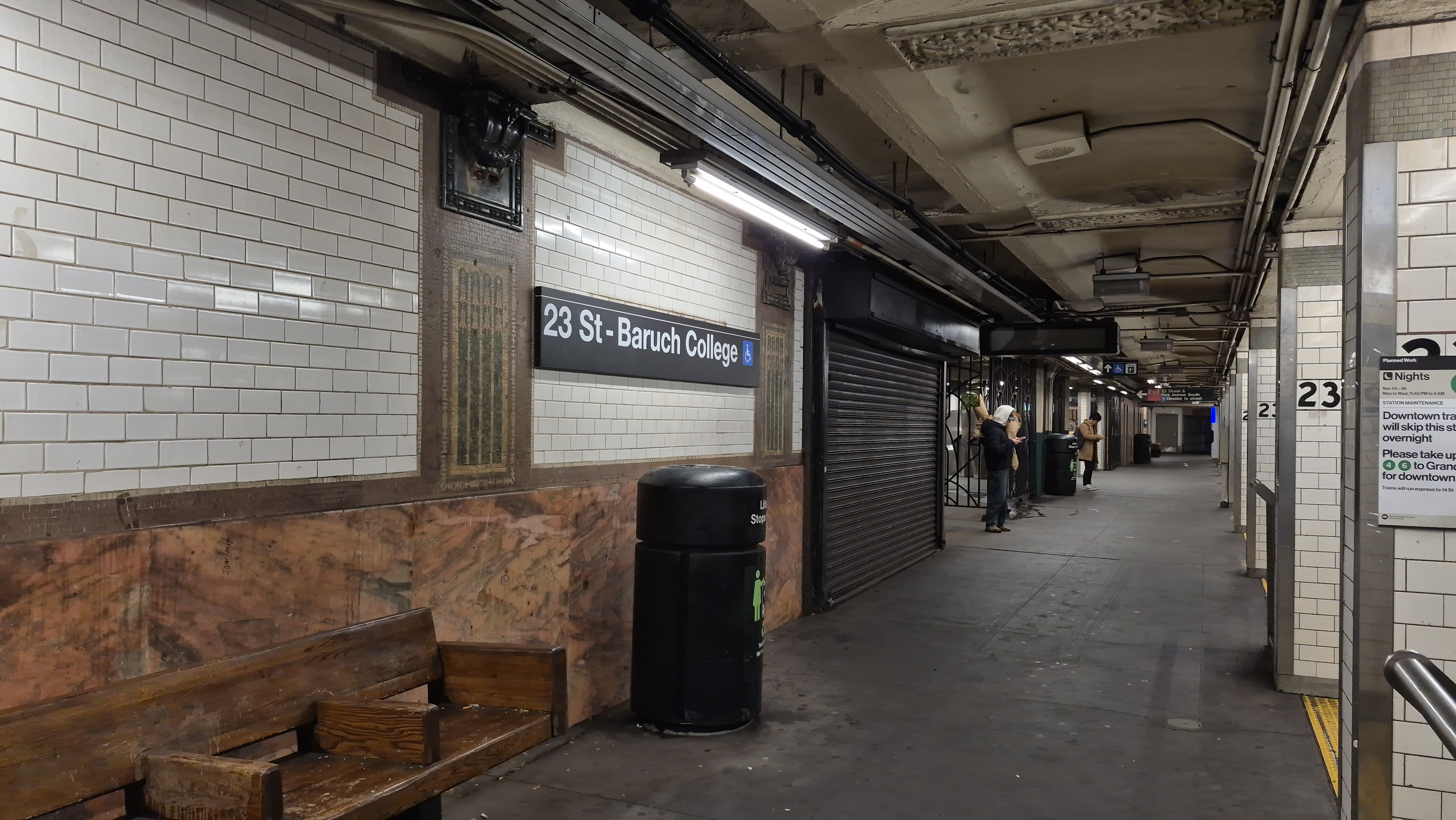
- View of southbound platform in 2025

Station statistics
- Address: East 23rd Street & Park Avenue South; New York, New York
- Borough: Manhattan
- Locale: Park Avenue South, (Note: The New York Times and the New York City Department of City Planning consider Park Avenue South to be a small micro-neighborhood between Gramercy and Flatiron. Park Avenue South is also the name of the street on which the 23rd Street station is located.) Gramercy, Flatiron District
- Coordinates: 40.740169°N 73.98644°W
- Division: A (IRT)
- Line: IRT Lexington Avenue Line
- Services: 4 (late nights); 6 (all times) <6> (weekdays until 8:45 p.m., peak direction)
- Transit: NYCT Bus: M1, M2, M3, M23 SBS, M55, M101, M102, M103, X37, X38, QM63, QM64, QM68, SIM3, SIM6, SIM10, SIM11, SIM31; MTA Bus: BxM6, BxM7, BxM8, BxM9, BxM10, BM1, BM2, BM3, BM4, QM21; NYC Ferry: Soundview Route (on FDR Drive/Avenue C and East 20th Street)
- Structure: Underground
- Platforms: 2 side platforms
- Tracks: 4

Other information
- Opened: October 27, 1904 (121 years ago)
- Accessible: Yes
- Former/other names: 23rd Street (1904–2025)

Traffic
- 2025: 6,031,370 ▲8.1%
- Rank: 47 out of 423
Services
Preceding station	New York City Subway	Following station
28th Street 4 6 <6> toward Pelham Bay Park	Local	14th Street–Union Square 4 6 <6> toward Brooklyn Bridge–City Hall
does not stop here
Non-revenue services and lines
Preceding station	New York City Subway	Following station
	no service	18th Street closed
Location
Location within New York City Subway
Location within New York City
Location within New York
Track layout
Street map
Station service legend
Symbol	Description
Stops all times	Stops all times
Stops late nights only	Stops late nights only
Stops rush hours in the peak direction only	Stops rush hours in the peak direction only

The 23rd Street–Baruch College station (known as 23rd Street until 2025) is a local station on the IRT Lexington Avenue Line of the New York City Subway. Located at the intersection of Park Avenue South and 23rd Street in Gramercy Park and Flatiron District, Manhattan, it is served by 6 trains at all times, <6> trains during weekdays in the peak direction, and 4 trains during late night hours.

The 23rd Street station was constructed for the Interborough Rapid Transit Company (IRT) as part of the city's first subway line, which was approved in 1900. Construction of the line segment that includes the 23rd Street station started on September 12 of the same year. The station opened on October 27, 1904, as one of the original 28 stations of the New York City Subway. The station's platforms were lengthened in the late 1940s. In 2025, it was renamed after the nearby Baruch College.

The 23rd Street station contains two side platforms and four tracks; express trains use the inner two tracks to bypass the station. The station was built with tile and mosaic decorations, which are continued along the platform extensions. The platforms contain exits to 22nd Street to the south and 23rd Street to the north. The platforms are not connected to each other within fare control. The station contains elevators from the street, which make it compliant with the Americans with Disabilities Act of 1990.

== History ==
=== Construction and opening ===
Planning for a subway line in New York City dates to 1864. However, development of what would become the city's first subway line did not start until 1894, when the New York State Legislature passed the Rapid Transit Act. The subway plans were drawn up by a team of engineers led by William Barclay Parsons, the Rapid Transit Commission's chief engineer. It called for a subway line from New York City Hall in lower Manhattan to the Upper West Side, where two branches would lead north into the Bronx. A plan was formally adopted in 1897, and all legal conflicts over the route alignment were resolved near the end of 1899. The Rapid Transit Construction Company, organized by John B. McDonald and funded by August Belmont Jr., signed the initial Contract 1 with the Rapid Transit Commission in February 1900, in which it would construct the subway and maintain a 50-year operating lease from the opening of the line. In 1901, the firm of Heins & LaFarge was hired to design the underground stations. Belmont incorporated the Interborough Rapid Transit Company (IRT) in April 1902 to operate the subway.

The 23rd Street station was constructed as part of the route segment from Great Jones Street to 41st Street. Construction on this section of the line began on September 12, 1900. The section from Great Jones Street to a point 100 feet (30 m) north of 33rd Street was awarded to Holbrook, Cabot & Daly Contracting Company, while the remaining section to 41st Street was done by Ira A. Shaker. By late 1903, the subway was nearly complete, but the IRT Powerhouse and the system's electrical substations were still under construction, delaying the system's opening. The 23rd Street station opened on October 27, 1904, as one of the original 28 stations of the New York City Subway from City Hall to 145th Street on the Broadway–Seventh Avenue Line.

=== Service changes and station renovations ===
After the first subway line was completed in 1908, the station was served by local trains along both the West Side (now the Broadway–Seventh Avenue Line to Van Cortlandt Park–242nd Street) and East Side (now the Lenox Avenue Line). West Side local trains had their southern terminus at City Hall during rush hours and South Ferry at other times, and had their northern terminus at 242nd Street. East Side local trains ran from City Hall to Lenox Avenue (145th Street).

To address overcrowding, in 1909, the New York Public Service Commission proposed lengthening the platforms at stations along the original IRT subway. As part of a modification to the IRT's construction contracts made on January 18, 1910, the company was to lengthen station platforms to accommodate ten-car express and six-car local trains. In addition to $1.5 million (equivalent to $51.8 million in 2025) spent on platform lengthening, $500,000 (equivalent to $17.3 million in 2025) was spent on building additional entrances and exits. It was anticipated that these improvements would increase capacity by 25 percent. Platforms at local stations, such as the 23rd Street station, were lengthened by between 20 and 30 feet (6.1 and 9.1 m). Both platforms were extended to the north and south. Six-car local trains began operating in October 1910. The Lexington Avenue Line opened north of Grand Central–42nd Street in 1918, and the original line was divided into an H-shaped system. All local trains were sent via the Lexington Avenue Line, running along the Pelham Line in the Bronx.

In December 1922, the Transit Commission approved a $3 million project to lengthen platforms at 14 local stations along the original IRT line, including 23rd Street and seven other stations on the Lexington Avenue Line. Platform lengths at these stations would be increased from 225 to 436 feet (69 to 133 m). The commission postponed the platform-lengthening project in September 1923, at which point the cost had risen to $5.6 million.

The city government took over the IRT's operations on June 12, 1940. In January 1947, the New York City Board of Transportation awarded a $4.003 million contract for the lengthening of platforms at the 23rd Street, 28th Street, and 33rd Street stations. The platform extensions at all three stations opened on April 13, 1948, after which they could accommodate ten-car trains.

In 1981, the MTA listed the station among the 69 most deteriorated stations in the subway system. A renovation of the 23rd Street station was funded as part of the MTA's 1980–1984 capital plan. The MTA received a $106 million grant from the Urban Mass Transit Administration in October 1983; most of the grant would fund the renovation of eleven stations, including 23rd Street.

The station's token booths were shuttered in May 2005, after fare tokens were replaced with MetroCards; station agents were deployed elsewhere in the station to answer passengers' queries. This was part of a pilot program that was tested at seven other stations. In late 2014, construction began to install ADA-accessible elevators in the station. To make room for the elevator that serves the northbound platform, the northbound staircase on the northeastern corner of Park Avenue South and 23rd Street had to be demolished, and was relocated a few feet down the street. The relocated staircase opened in August 2015. The construction was completed in December 2016, making the station fully ADA-compliant.

On September 20, 2024, Governor Kathy Hochul signed a bill that would rename the station 23rd Street–Baruch College after the nearby Baruch College. This name change was ultimately made on October 17, 2025. In 2026, as part of a pilot program to reduce fare evasion at New York City Subway stations, the MTA installed full-height, glass-paneled turnstiles at the 23rd Street–Baruch College station.

== Station layout ==
Like other local stations, 23rd Street has four tracks and two side platforms. The 6 stops here at all times, rush-hour and midday <6> trains stop here in the peak direction; and the 4 stops here during late nights. The two express tracks are used by the 4 and 5 trains during daytime hours. The station is between 28th Street to the north and 14th Street–Union Square to the south. The platforms were originally 200 feet (61 m) long, like at other local stations on the original IRT, but later became 520 feet (160 m) long. The platform extensions are at the south ends of the original platforms. The 23rd Street station is fully wheelchair-accessible, with elevators connecting the street and platforms. Fixed platform barriers, which are intended to prevent commuters falling to the tracks, are positioned near the platform edges.

=== Design ===
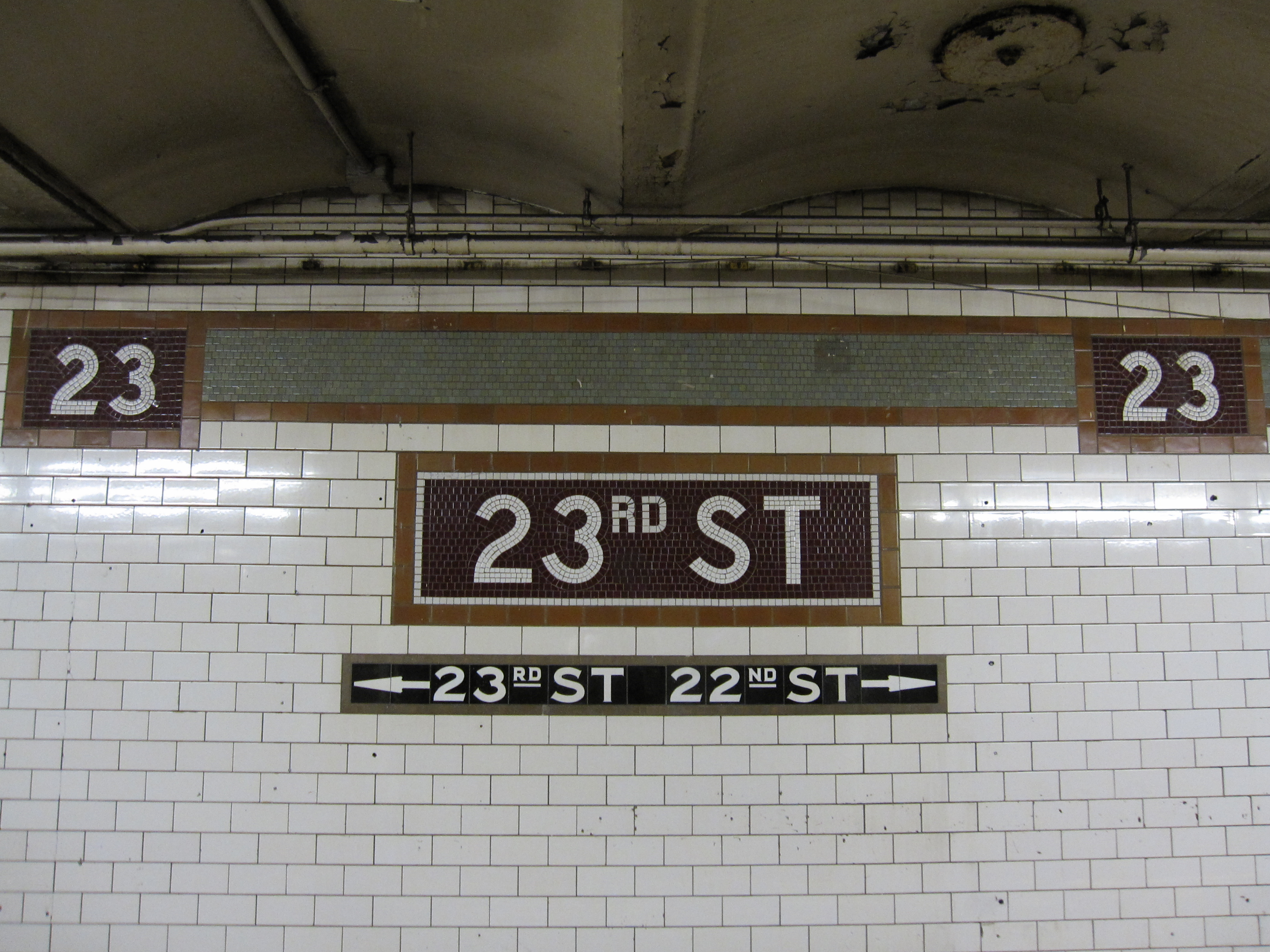
Mosaics with name and frieze

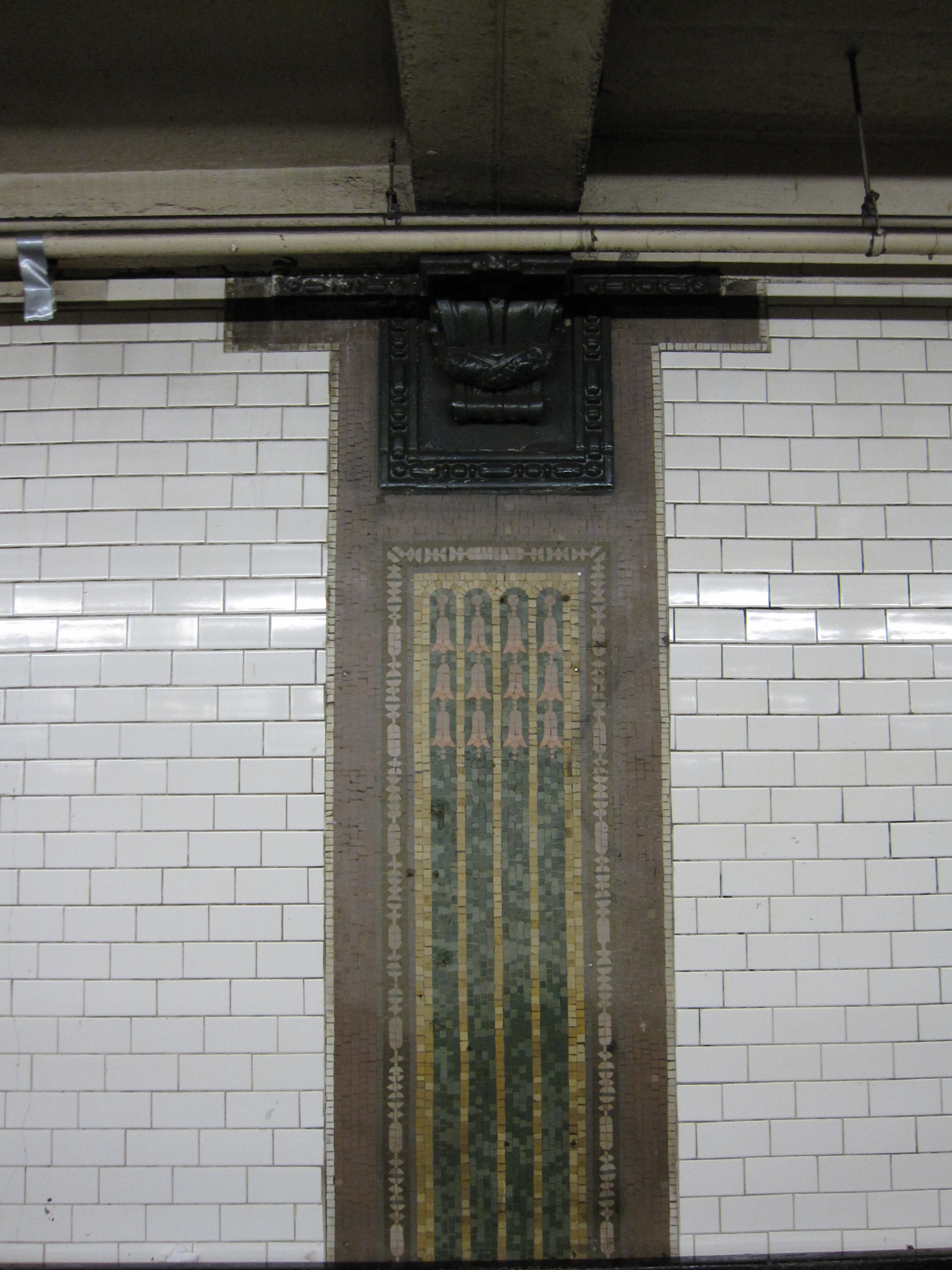
Faience ceiling moldings

As with other stations built as part of the original IRT, the station was constructed using a cut-and-cover method. The tunnel is covered by a U-shaped trough that contains utility pipes and wires. This trough contains a foundation of concrete no less than 4 inches (100 mm) thick. Each platform consists of 3-inch-thick (7.6 cm) concrete slabs, beneath which are drainage basins. The platforms contain columns with white glazed tiles, spaced every 15 feet (4.6 m). Additional columns between the tracks, spaced every 5 feet (1.5 m), support the jack-arched concrete station roofs. There is a 1-inch (25 mm) gap between the trough wall and the platform walls, which are made of 4-inch (100 mm)-thick brick covered over by a tiled finish.

The original decorative scheme consisted of black tile station-name tablets, violet and white tile bands, a grey faience cornice, blue faience plaques, and marble wainscoting. The mosaic tiles at all original IRT stations were manufactured by the American Encaustic Tile Company, which subcontracted the installations at each station. The decorative work was performed by tile contractor Manhattan Glass Tile Company and faience contractor Rookwood Pottery Company. The ceilings of the original platforms and fare control areas contain plaster molding.

There are no open crossovers or crossunders between the platforms. The platform extensions had beige tiles. During station renovations in 1988, the beige tiles were removed and the original, white ones restored. It has IND-style signs indicating the way to the exits at 22nd and 23rd Streets. An ornate fare control grille on the southbound side is a piece of artwork entitled Long Division by artist Valerie Jaudon, which was installed during the renovation. The station features a back-lit "23 Street/Park Avenue South" sign at the platform level fare control. The station does not contain restrooms.

23rd St subway cross-section
8th Av	7th Av	6th Av			5th Av & Broadway	Park Av
A / C / E	1 / 2 / 3	FM↓	PATH	FM↑	N / Q / R / W	6 / <6>
underpass		underpass

=== Exits ===
Each platform has exits to both 22nd and 23rd Streets; the northbound platform's exits are on the eastern side of Park Avenue South while the southbound platform's exits are on the western side. At 23rd Street, each control area contains two stairs to the southern side of 23rd Street, and a stair and an elevator to the northern side. The northwestern corner stair, for the southbound platform, is within the One Madison Avenue office tower and contains a passageway into the basement of the same building. The elevators provide ADA-accessibility for the whole station.

At 22nd Street, each control area contains two exits, one each to the north and south sides of that street. The southwestern corner stair, for the southbound platform, is inside a building. The northeastern corner stair is outside the United Charities Building and the southeastern corner stair is outside the Church Missions House.

When the station was built, the IRT had made an agreement to construct an exit from the southbound platform into the Mercantile Building (now 304 Park Avenue South), at the southwestern corner of 23rd Street and Park Avenue South. A marble passageway, about 14 feet (4.3 m) wide by 165 feet (50 m) long, provided an exit to the building and to the southern side of 23rd Street between Park Avenue South and Madison Avenue, connecting to that building's elevators. The passageway was slightly higher than the southbound platform, so a broad, curved flight of stairs was built on the southern side of the southbound fare control area. There were store windows on the southern side of the passageway, overlooking the Mercantile Building's basement storefront. When opened, the passageway was advertised as New York City's first underground sidewalk. While the broad flight of stairs still exists, the passageway has been sealed. Another sealed passageway leads from the northbound platform to the lobby of 303 Park Avenue South, at the northeast corner with 23rd Street.

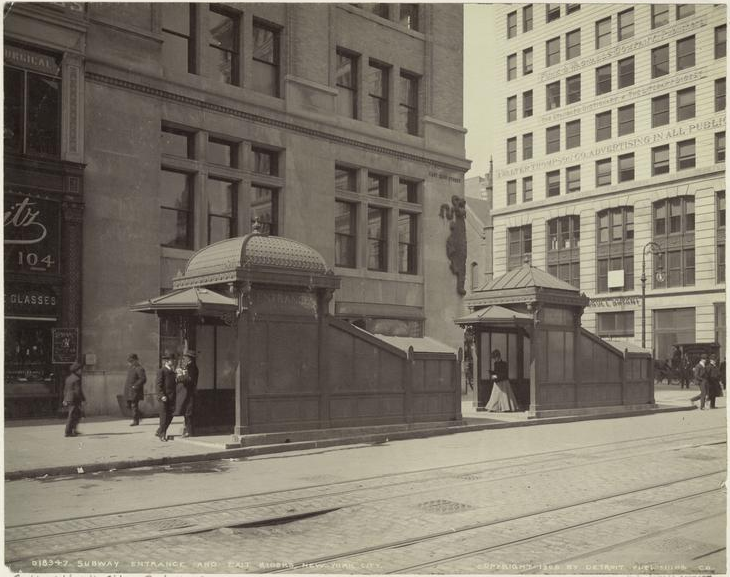
Original entrance kiosks

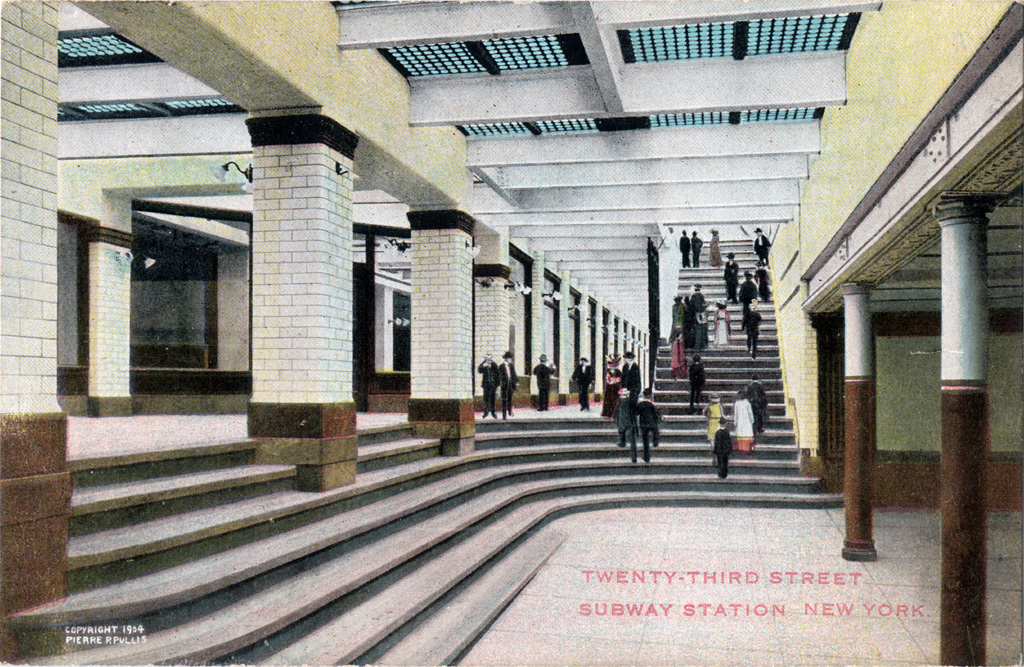
Mercantile Building entrance

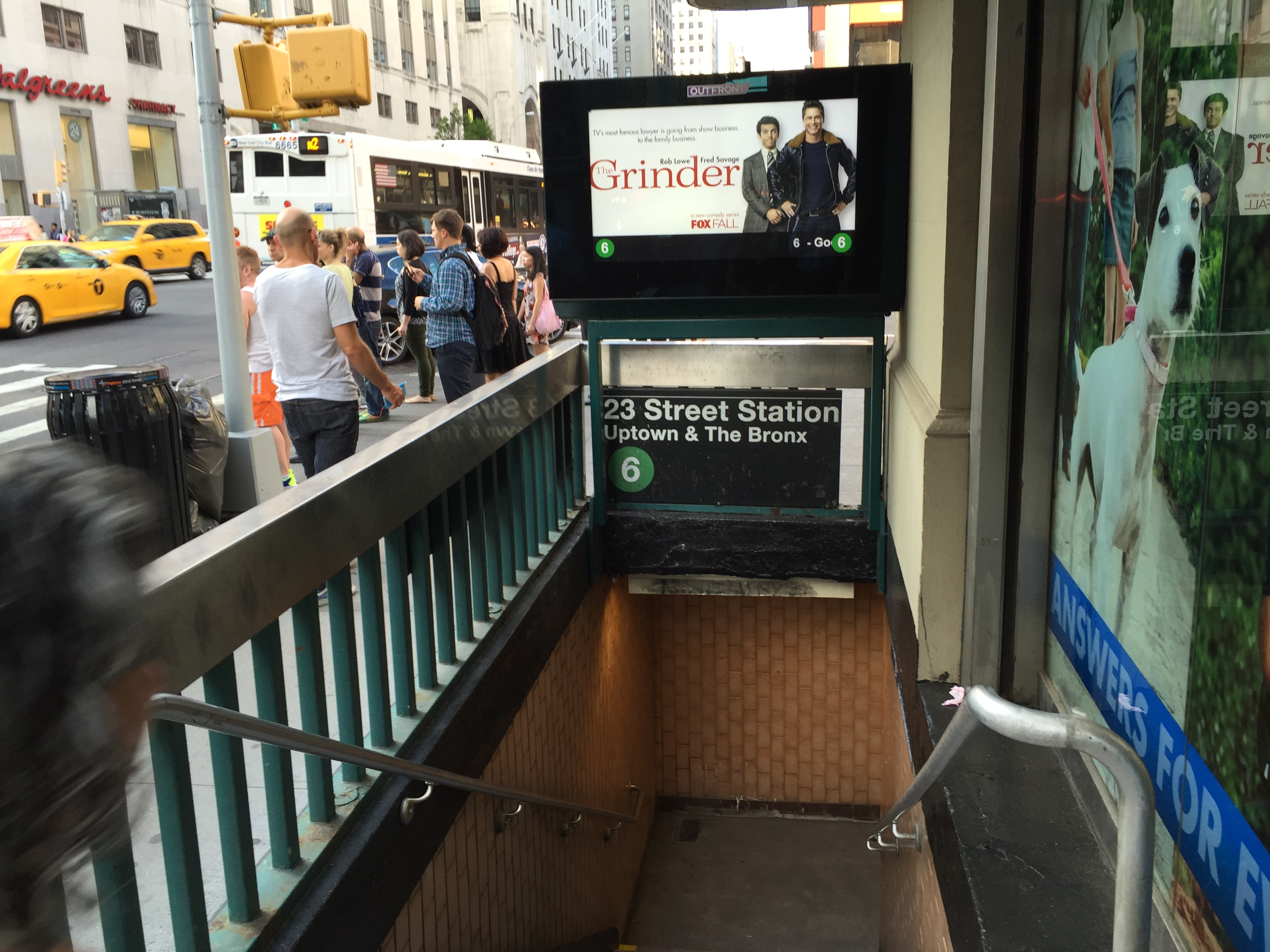
The former narrow entrance on the northeastern corner of 23rd St and Park Avenue South to the northbound platform

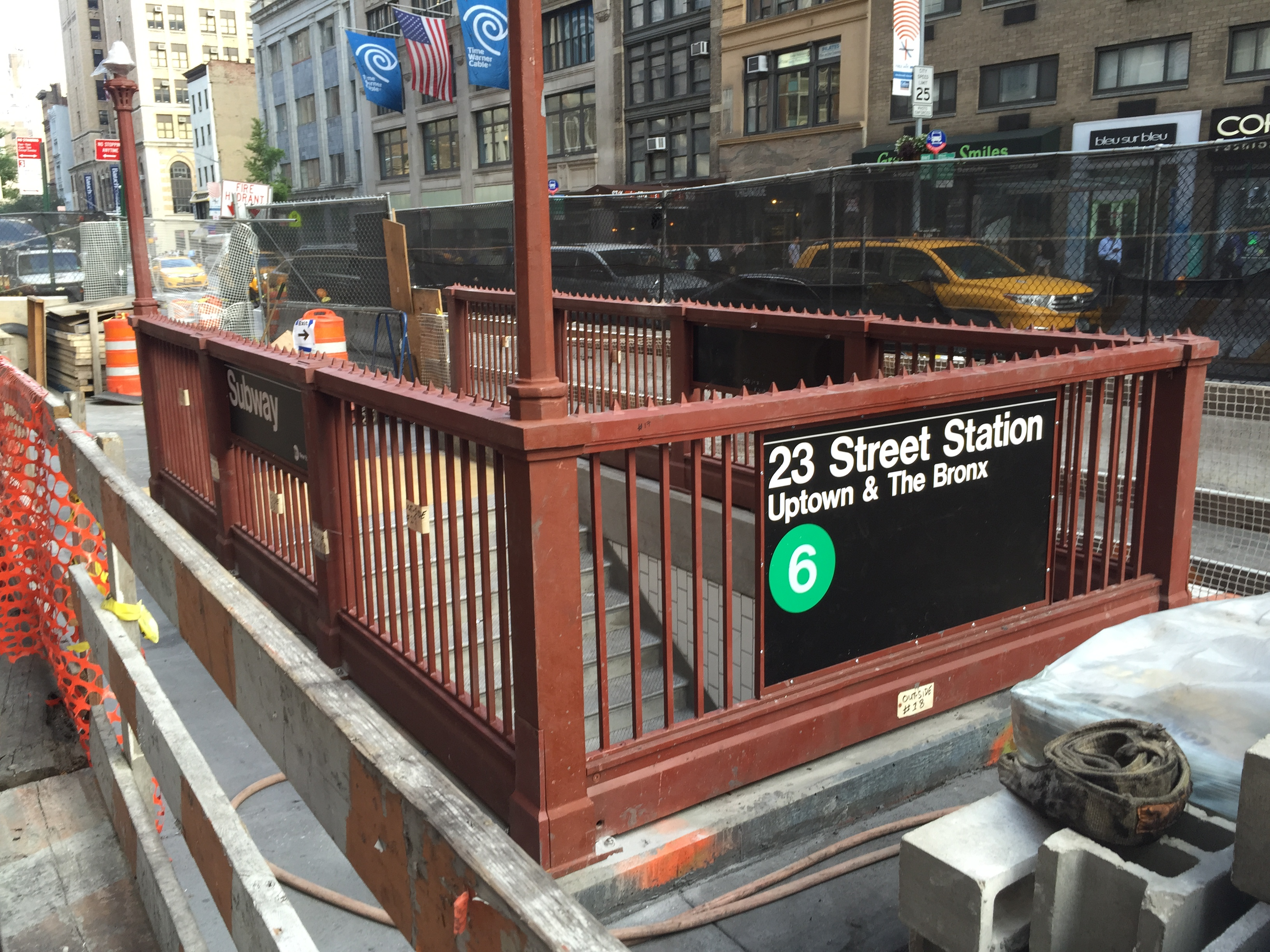
Relocated northeastern corner entrance under construction in July 2015

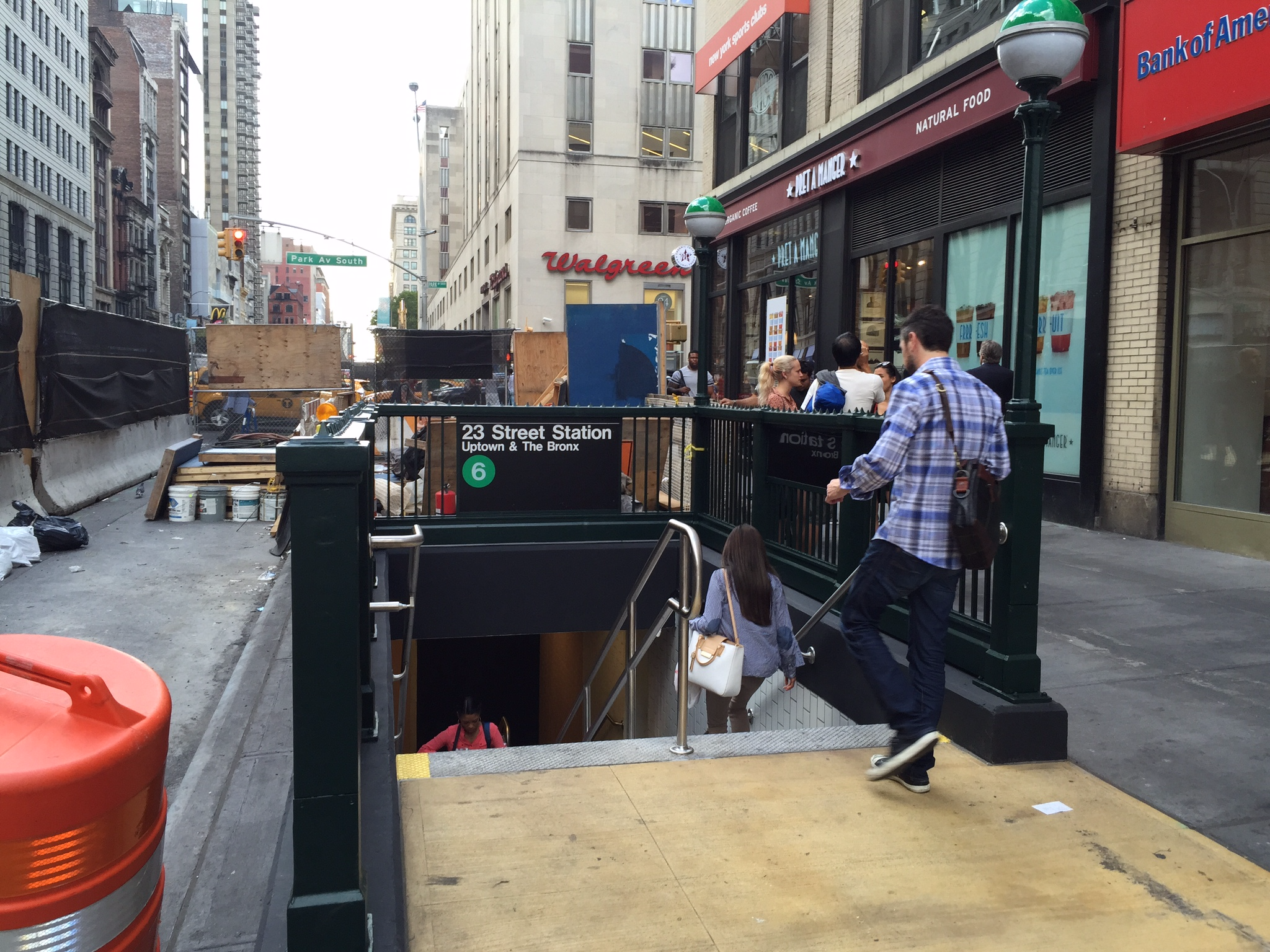
Relocated northeastern corner entrance, with construction of the elevator in the background
