= 23rd Street station (PATH) =

Port Authority Trans-Hudson rail station

23rd Street
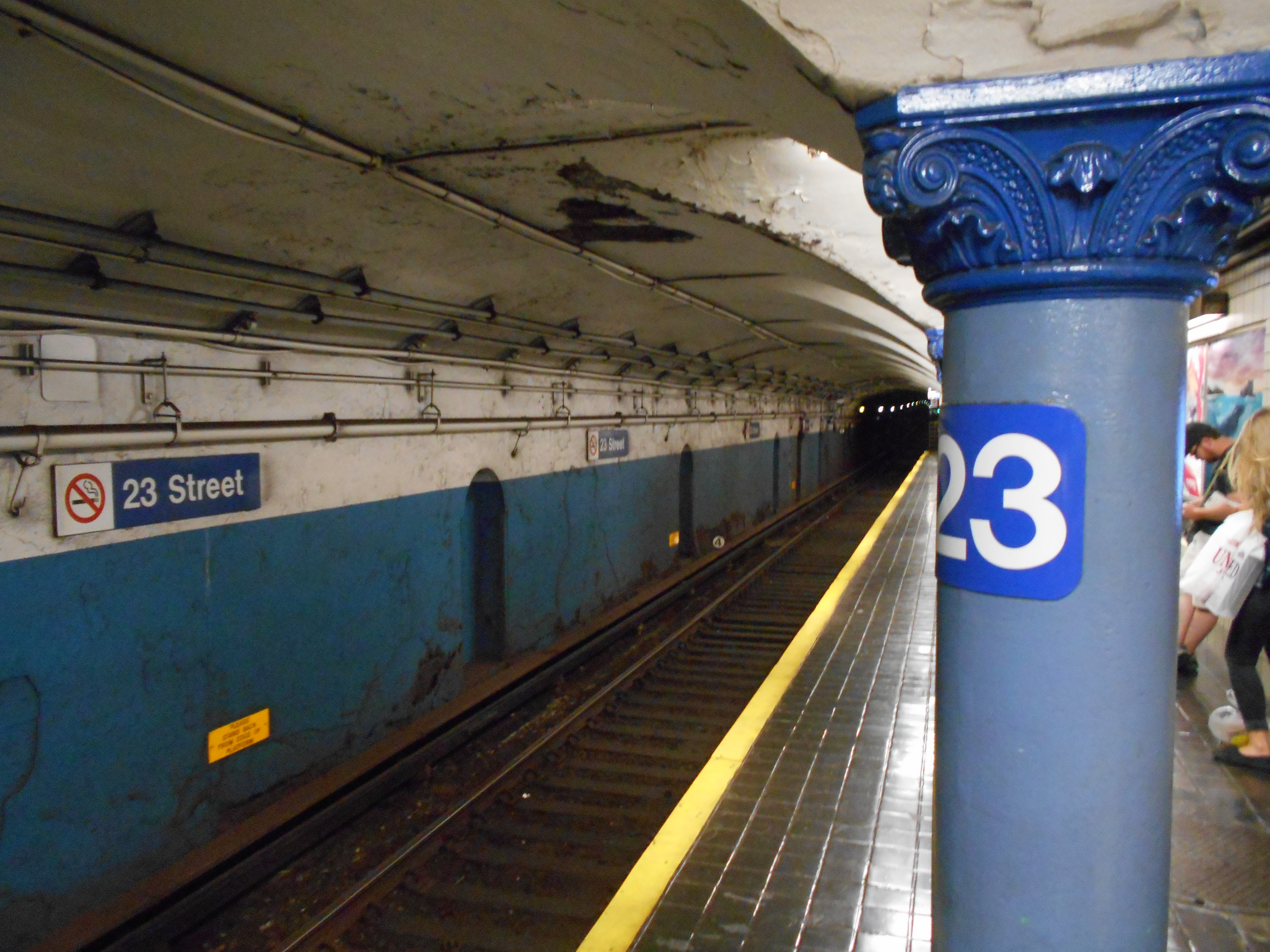
- The New Jersey-bound platform at 23rd Street in August 2014.

General information
- Location: 23rd Street and Sixth Avenue; Manhattan, New York
- Coordinates: 40.742893°N 73.992865°W
- Owner: Port Authority of New York and New Jersey
- Line: Uptown Hudson Tubes
- Platforms: 2 side platforms
- Tracks: 2
- Connections: New York City Subway: at 23rd Street; NYCT Bus: M7, M23 SBS, M55, SIM1C, SIM3C, SIM10, SIM31, X27, X28, X37, X38

Construction
- Structure type: Underground
- Accessible: No

History
- Opened: June 15, 1908

Passengers
- 2025: 1,998,748 ▲14.6%
- Rank: 10 of 13

Services
Preceding station	PATH	Following station
14th Street toward Hoboken	HOB–33	33rd Street Terminus
14th Street toward Journal Square	JSQ–33	33rd Street Terminus
Late-nights
14th Street toward Journal Square	JSQ–33 (via HOB)	33rd Street Terminus
Former services
Preceding station	Hudson and Manhattan Railroad	Following station
19th Street toward Summit Avenue	Summit Avenue–33rd Street	28th Street toward Hudson Terminal
Track layout
Location

23rd Street station is a station on the PATH system. Located at the intersection of 23rd Street and Sixth Avenue (Avenue of the Americas) in the Chelsea neighborhood of Manhattan, New York City, it is served by the Hoboken–33rd Street and Journal Square–33rd Street lines during the daytime, and by the Journal Square–33rd Street (via Hoboken) line during late nights and weekend mornings.

== History ==
The station opened on June 15, 1908. Before the line was extended to 23rd Street, the northern terminus of the Hudson and Manhattan Railroad was a station located at 19th Street (now closed).

The station's platforms were lengthened in 1987.

== Station layout ==
This PATH station has two side platforms, but passengers must descend one level, walk through an underpass, and go up another stairwell, leading to the New York City Subway mezzanine. The PATH fare control is located in the underpass, which is located between the local and express tracks of the IND Sixth Avenue Line.

There is a connection to the Sixth Avenue Line at their platforms, served by the F, <F>, and M trains, which surround both sides of the PATH station. The express tracks, used by the B and D trains, are located below the PATH tracks on a lower level. The express tracks were constructed in the mid-1960s using the "deep-bore" tunneling method and both are not visible from the station. On the express tracks on the lower level, the deep-bore tunnel's round shape becomes square below this station and at 14th Street stations, where provisions for lower level platforms were built.

23rd St subway cross-section
8th Av	7th Av	6th Av			5th Av & Broadway	Park Av
A / C / E	1 / 2 / 3	FM↓	PATH	FM↑	N / Q / R / W	6 / <6>
underpass		underpass

=== Exits ===
The northbound platform can be accessed from the exits on the east side of 23rd Street and Sixth Avenue, while the southbound platform can be accessed from the exits on the west side. There are two exits to each corner of that intersection, which serve both the subway and PATH platforms in each direction. The PATH station has direct entrances only from the IND station on either side, which are accessed only by going below the subway platform in the respective direction and then ascending onto the PATH platform. The 33rd Street-bound PATH is accessed from the northbound subway platform, while the New Jersey-bound PATH is accessed from the southbound subway platform. The southern entrances on each side appear to be part of the original 1911 PATH entrances.

Combined New York City Subway and PATH entrances at 23rd Street and Sixth Avenue
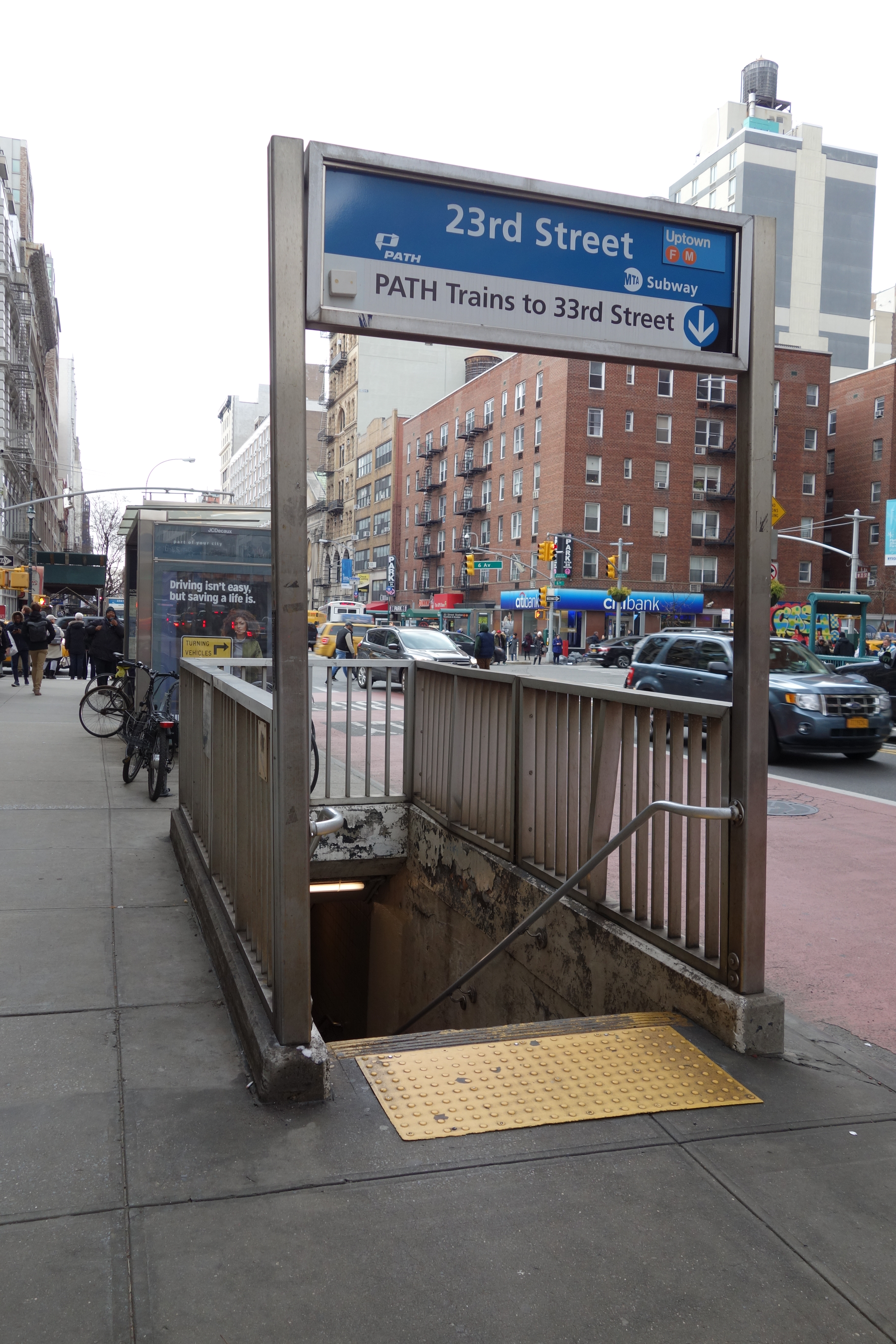
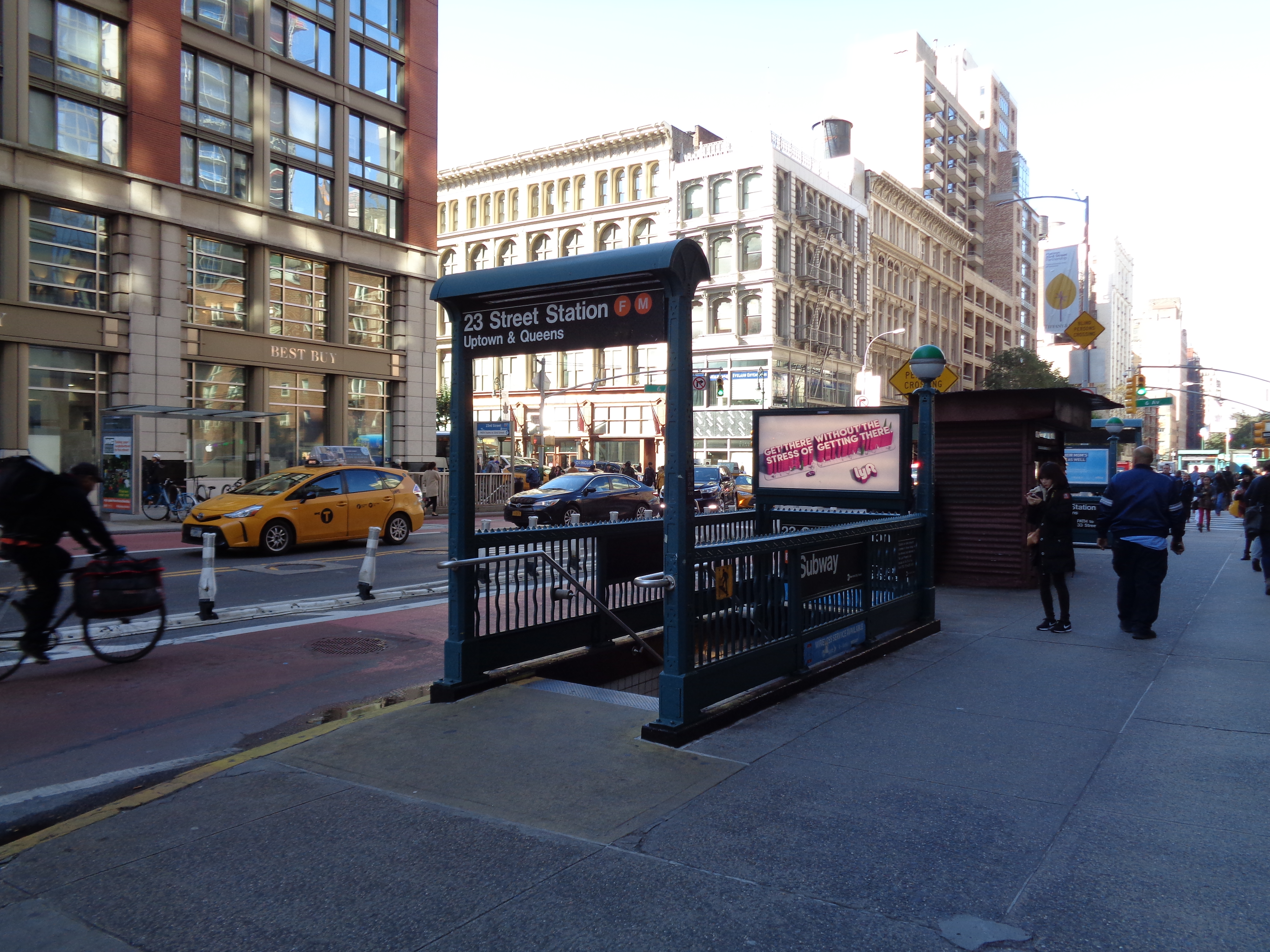
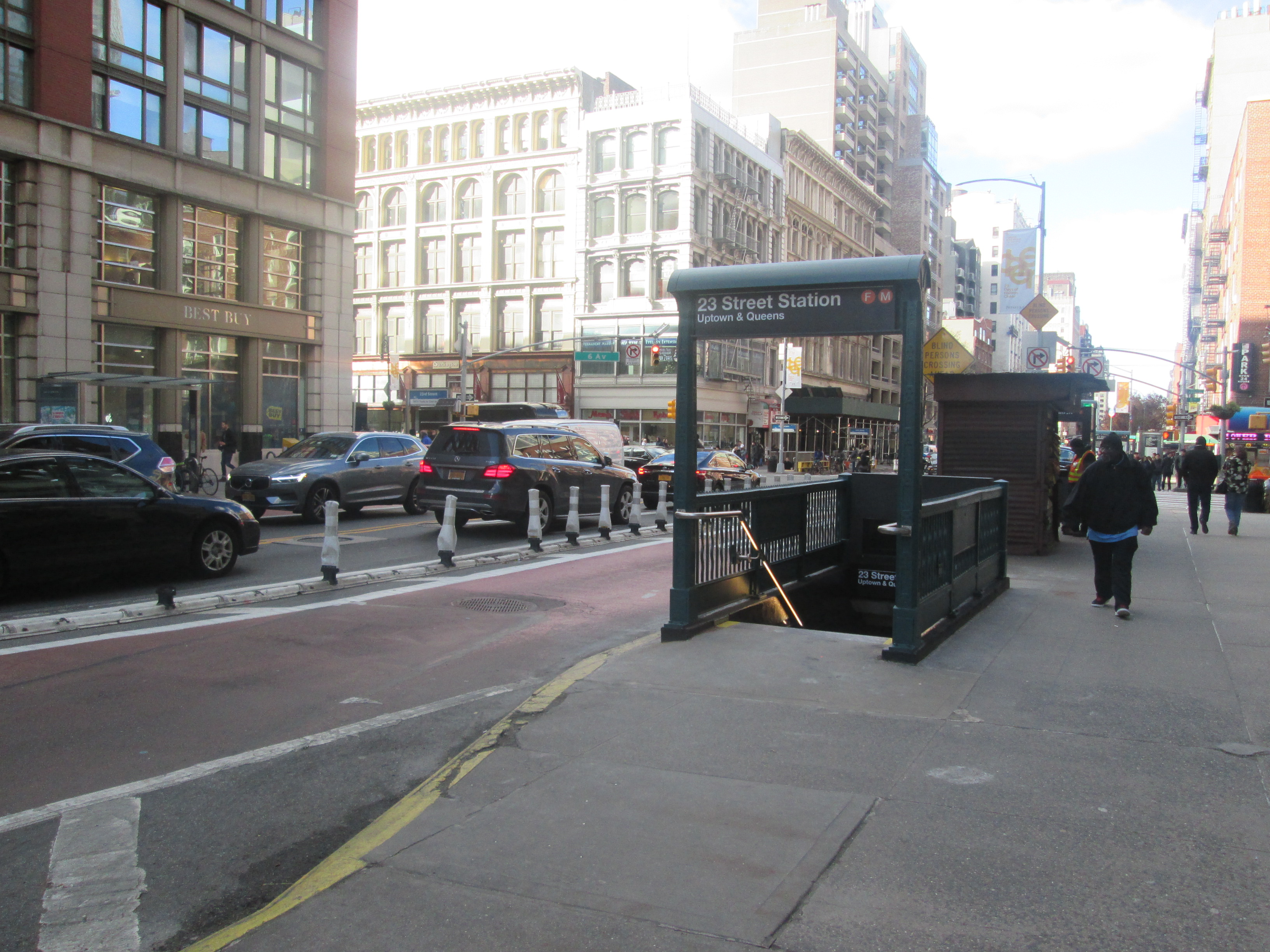
From left to right:
- Southeast corner entrance, seen in 2017
- Northeast corner entrance, seen in 2017
- Northeast corner entrance, seen in 2018 after New York City Subway station's renovation

The station is near the Flatiron Building, Madison Square Park, Metropolitan Life Insurance Company Tower, and New York Life Insurance Building.
