= 23rd Street station (BMT Broadway Line) =

New York City Subway station in Manhattan

23 Street
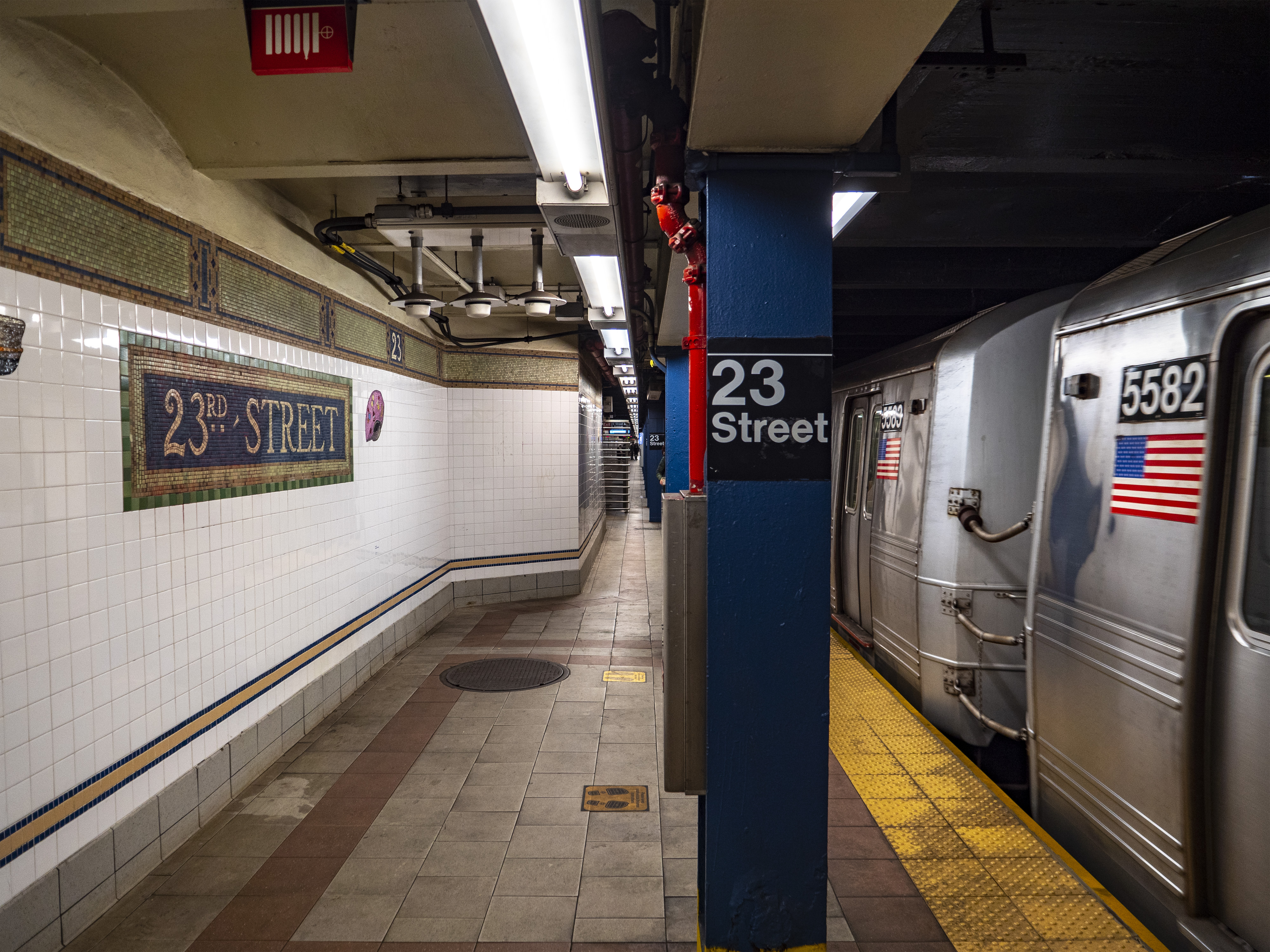
- Southbound platform with arriving R46 W train

Station statistics
- Address: 23rd Street, Fifth Avenue & Broadway; New York, New York
- Borough: Manhattan
- Locale: Flatiron District, Madison Square
- Coordinates: 40.741339°N 73.989272°W
- Division: B (BMT)
- Line: BMT Broadway Line
- Services: N (weekends and late nights); Q (late nights only); R (all except late nights); W (weekdays only)
- Transit: NYCT Bus: M1, M2, M3, M23 SBS, M55, X27, X28, X37, X38, SIM1C, SIM3, SIM3C, SIM4C, SIM10, SIM31, SIM33C; MTA Bus: BxM6, BxM7, BxM8, BxM9, BxM10, BM1, BM2, BM3, BM4, QM21
- Structure: Underground
- Platforms: 2 side platforms
- Tracks: 4

Other information
- Opened: January 5, 1918 (108 years ago)

Traffic
- 2025: 4,815,798 ▲7%
- Rank: 61 out of 423
Services
Preceding station	New York City Subway	Following station
28th Street N Q R W via Lexington Avenue–59th Street	Local	14th Street–Union Square N Q R W via Whitehall Street–South Ferry
Location
Location within New York City Subway
Location within New York City
Location within New York
Track layout
Street map
Station service legend
Symbol	Description
Stops all times except late nights	Stops all times except late nights
Stops weekdays during the day	Stops weekdays during the day
Stops late nights and weekends	Stops late nights and weekends
Stops late nights only	Stops late nights only

The 23rd Street station is a local station on the BMT Broadway Line of the New York City Subway. Located at the intersection of 23rd Street, Broadway, and Fifth Avenue in the Flatiron District of Manhattan, it is served by the R train at all times except late nights, the W train on weekdays, the N train during late nights and weekends, and the Q train during late nights.

== History ==
=== Construction and opening ===
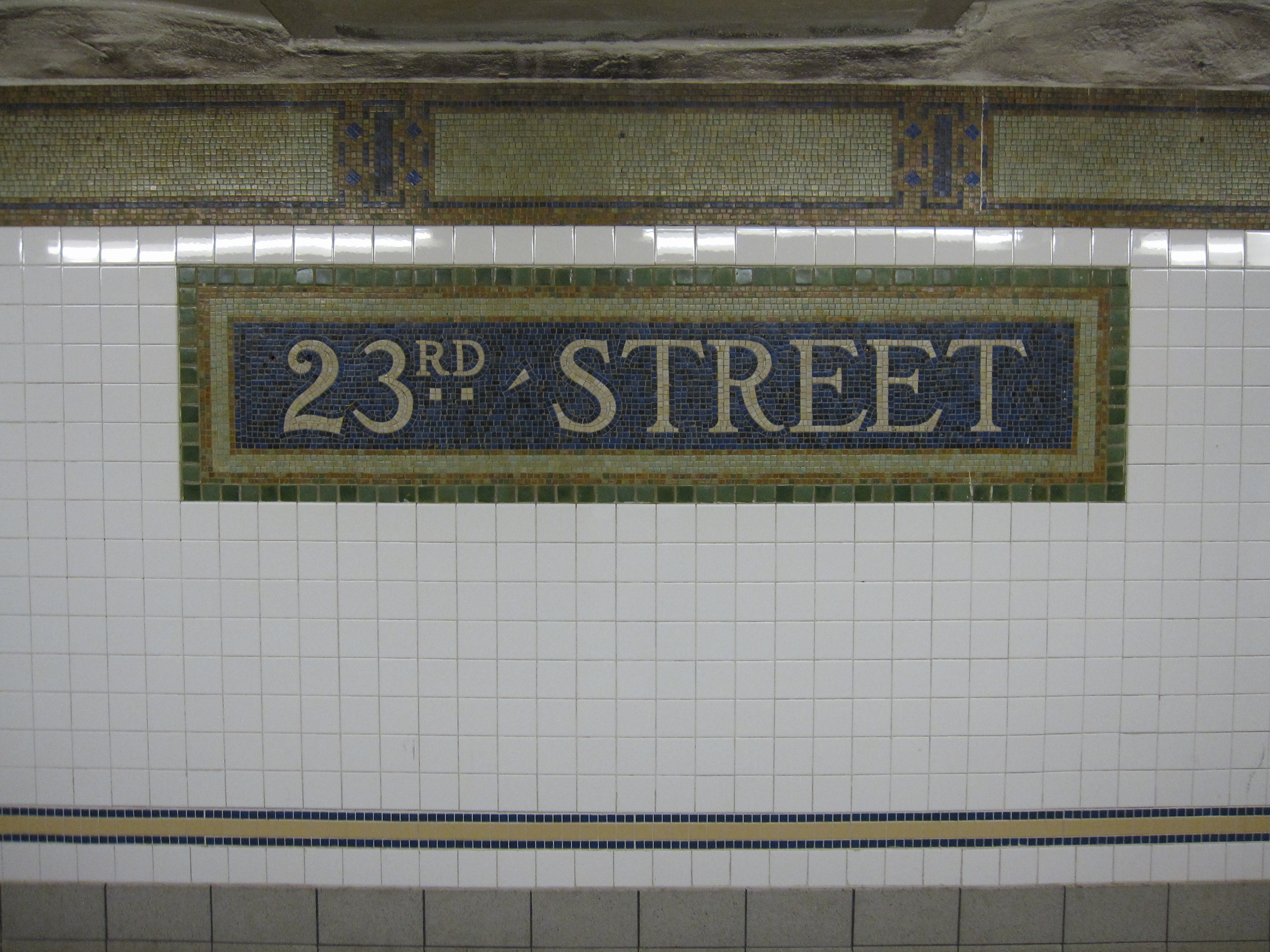
Mosaic name tablet

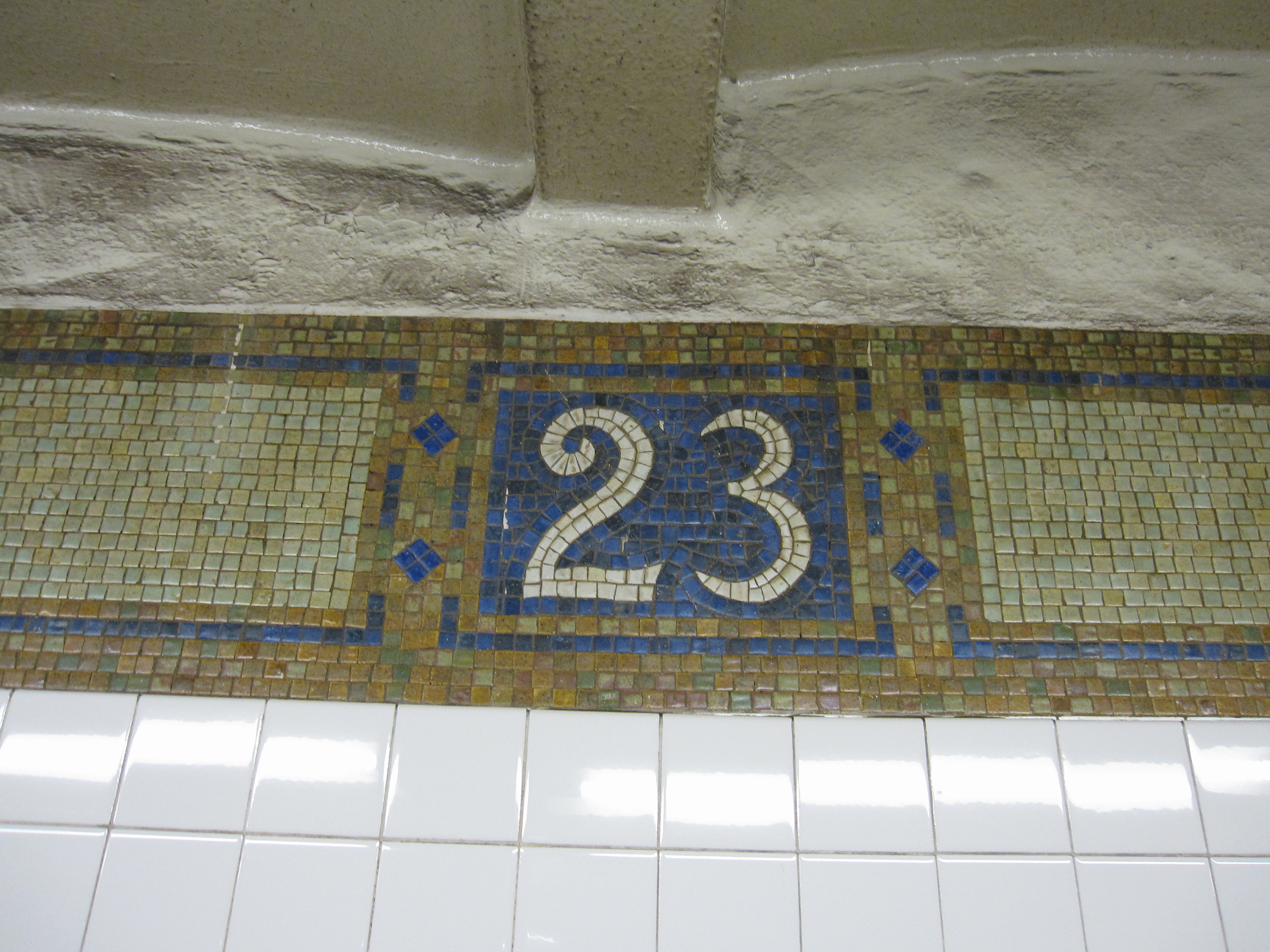
Detail of mosaic frieze

The New York Public Service Commission adopted plans for what was known as the Broadway–Lexington Avenue route on December 31, 1907. This route began at the Battery and ran under Greenwich Street, Vesey Street, Broadway to Ninth Street, private property to Irving Place, and Irving Place and Lexington Avenue to the Harlem River. After crossing under the Harlem River into the Bronx, the route split at Park Avenue and 138th Street, with one branch continuing north to and along Jerome Avenue to Woodlawn Cemetery, and the other heading east and northeast along 138th Street, Southern Boulevard, and Westchester Avenue to Pelham Bay Park. In early 1908, the Tri-borough plan was formed, combining this route, the under-construction Centre Street Loop Subway in Manhattan and Fourth Avenue Subway in Brooklyn, a Canal Street subway from the Fourth Avenue Subway via the Manhattan Bridge to the Hudson River, and several other lines in Brooklyn.

The Brooklyn Rapid Transit Company submitted a proposal to the commission, dated March 2, 1911, to operate the Tri-borough system (but under Church Street instead of Greenwich Street), as well as a branch along Broadway, Seventh Avenue, and 59th Street from Ninth Street north and east to the Queensboro Bridge; the Canal Street subway was to merge with the Broadway Line instead of continuing to the Hudson River. The city, the BRT, and the Interborough Rapid Transit Company (which operated the first subway and four elevated lines in Manhattan) came to an agreement, and sent a report to the New York City Board of Estimate on June 5, 1911. The line along Broadway to 59th Street was assigned to the BRT, while the IRT obtained the Lexington Avenue line, connecting with its existing route at Grand Central–42nd Street. Construction began on Lexington Avenue on July 31, and on Broadway the next year. The Dual Contracts, two operating contracts between the city and the BMT and IRT, were adopted on March 4, 1913.

A short portion of the line, coming off the north side of the Manhattan Bridge through Canal Street to 14th Street–Union Square, opened on September 4, 1917, at 2 P.M., with an eight car train carrying members of the Public Service Commission, representatives of the city government and officials of the BRT, leaving Union Square toward Coney Island. Service opened to the general public at 8 P.M., with trains leaving Union Square and Coney Island simultaneously. The line was served by two services. One route ran via the Fourth Avenue Line and the Sea Beach Line to Coney Island, while the other line, the short line, ran to Ninth Avenue, where passengers could transfer for West End and Culver Line service. The initial headway on the line was three minutes during rush hours, three minutes and forty-five seconds at other times, except during late nights when service ran every fifteen minutes.

23rd Street station opened on January 5, 1918, as the BMT Broadway Line was extended north from 14th Street–Union Square to Times Square–42nd Street and south to Rector Street. Service at this station was provided by local services running between Times Square and Rector Street. Service was extended one station to Whitehall Street–South Ferry on September 20, 1918. On August 1, 1920, the Montague Street Tunnel opened, extending local service from Lower Manhattan to DeKalb Avenue in Downtown Brooklyn by traveling under the East River.

=== Later years ===
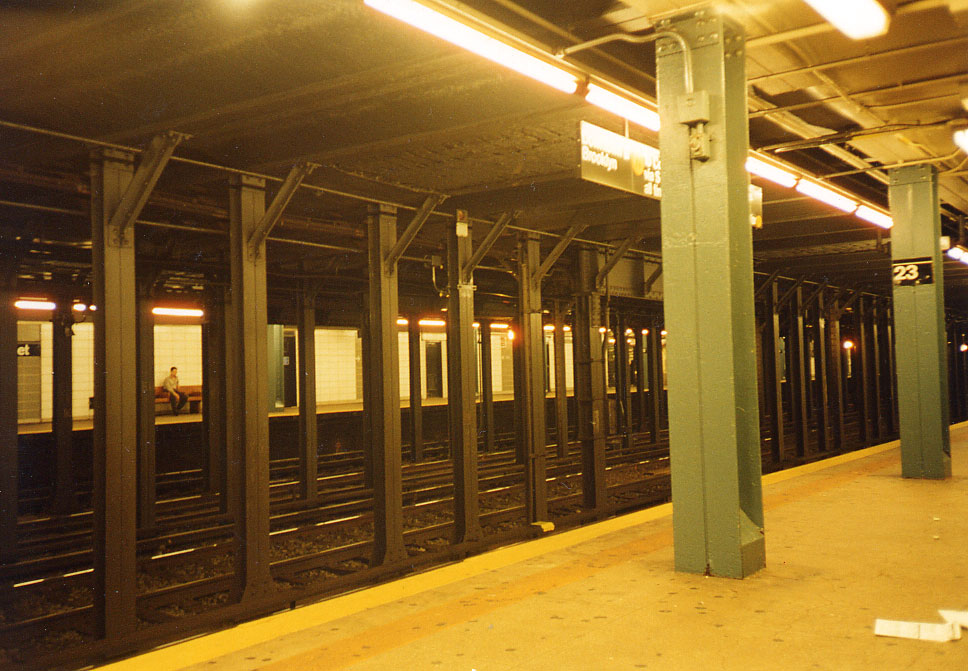
View of the station in 1999, before its 2001 renovation

The station's platforms originally could only fit six 67-foot-long (20 m) cars. In 1926, the New York City Board of Transportation received bids for the lengthening of platforms at nine stations on the Broadway Line, including the 23rd Street station, to accommodate eight-car trains. Edwards & Flood submitted a low bid of $101,775 for the project. The platform-lengthening project was completed in 1927, bringing the length of the platforms to 535 feet (163 m).

The city government took over the BMT's operations on June 1, 1940. The station was renovated in the 1970s to accommodate ten-car trains. As part of the renovation, the original wall tiles, old signs, and incandescent lighting were covered by modern-look wall tile band and tablet mosaics, and new signs and fluorescent lights were installed. Staircases and platform edges were also renovated.

On January 3, 1999, a schizophrenic man, Andrew Goldstein, pushed 32-year-old journalist and photographer Kendra Webdale onto the tracks from the Brooklyn-bound platform of this station. Webdale was then struck and killed by an oncoming N train. After two mistrials due to his mental incapacity, Goldstein pleaded guilty of manslaughter in October 2006 and sentenced to 23 years in prison. The incident led to the passing of Kendra's Law, which allows judges to order people suffering from certain psychological disorders to undergo regular treatment.

In 2001, the station received a major refurbishment, including installing ADA yellow safety treads along the platform edges, restoring the original tiling, repairing the staircases, installing new tiling on the floors, new signage and upgrading the station's lighting and installing a public address system.

In 2026, as part of a pilot program to install vending machines across the New York City Subway system, a vending machine was installed within one of the station's unused retail spaces.

== Station layout ==
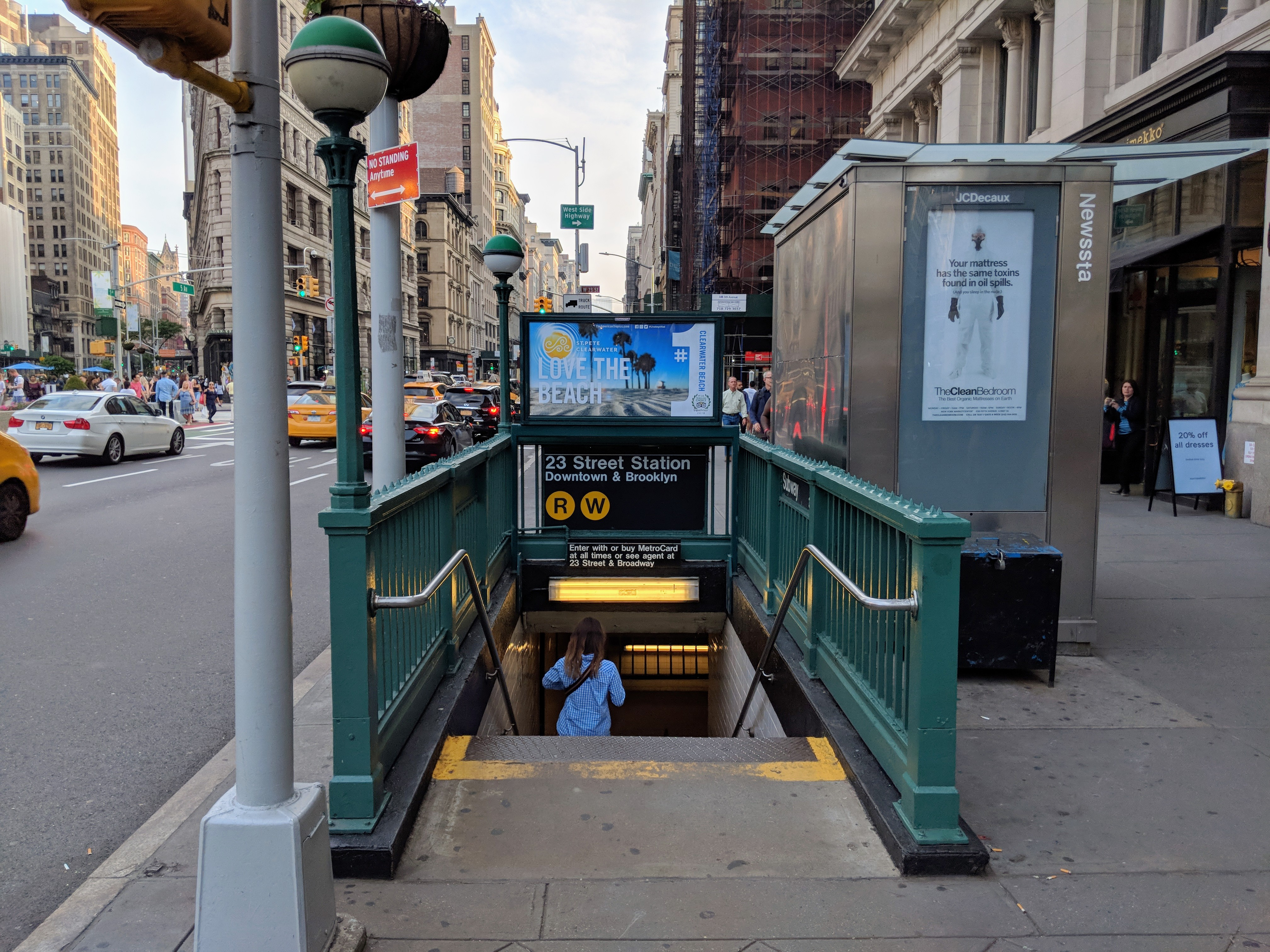
Downtown station entrance

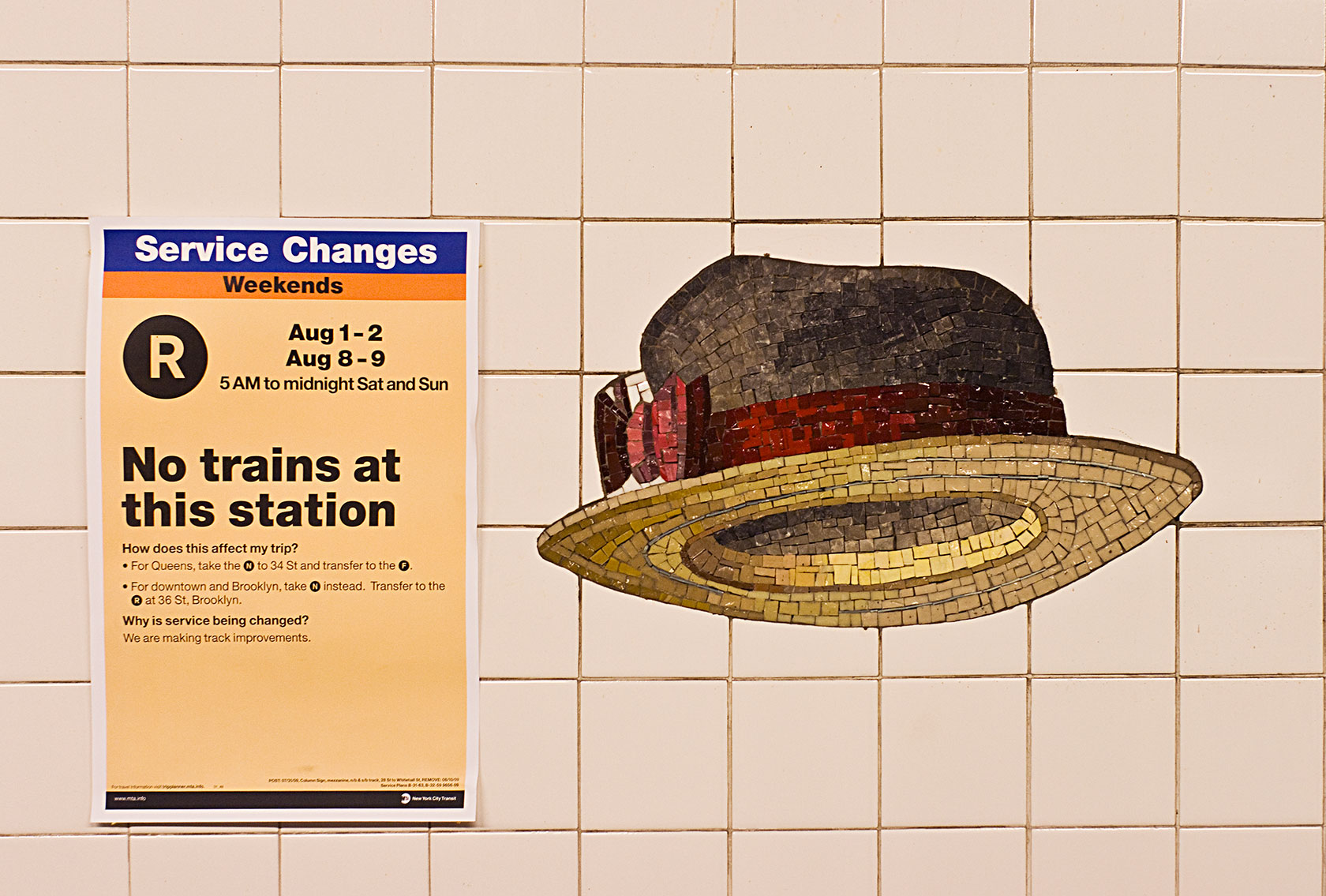
View of station artwork

This underground station has four tracks and two side platforms. The two center tracks are used by the N train on weekdays and Q train at all times except late nights. The platforms have their original trim line, which has "23" tablets on it at regular intervals, and name tablets, which read "23RD STREET" in serif font.

The 2002 artwork here is called Memories of Twenty-Third Street by Keith Godard. The platform walls feature mosaics depicting hats that famous people of the Flatiron District wore, including Oscar Wilde, Sarah Bernhardt, and W. E. B. Du Bois.

23rd St subway cross-section
8th Av	7th Av	6th Av			5th Av & Broadway	Park Av
A / C / E	1 / 2 / 3	FM↓	PATH	FM↑	N / Q / R / W	6 / <6>
underpass		underpass

=== Exits ===
Each platform has two same-level fare control areas. The primary ones are at the north ends of the platforms. The Queens-bound platform has a bank of regular and high exit-only turnstiles, the station's full-time token booth, and four street stairs. Two go up to the northeastern corner of Broadway and 23rd Street (outside Madison Square Park) and the other two go to the southeast. The Brooklyn-bound platform has a bank of regular and high exit-only turnstiles, a now defunct customer assistance booth, and two street stairs. One is connected to fare control via a passageway and goes up to the southeastern corner of 23rd Street and Fifth Avenue outside the Flatiron Building, while the other goes up to the northwestern corner of Broadway and Fifth Avenue, near a mid-block pedestrian crossing.

The station's other two fare control areas are at the south end of the station. The one on the Queens-bound platform is unstaffed, containing High Entry-Exit Turnstiles and one staircase going up to the northeastern corner of 22nd Street and Broadway. The turnstile on the Brooklyn-bound platform is exit-only and has one staircase to the northwest corner of 22nd Street and Broadway. There is a crossunder here that was closed in the 1990s and is now only used for station facilities.
