= 23rd Street station (IND Eighth Avenue Line) =

New York City Subway station in Manhattan

23 Street
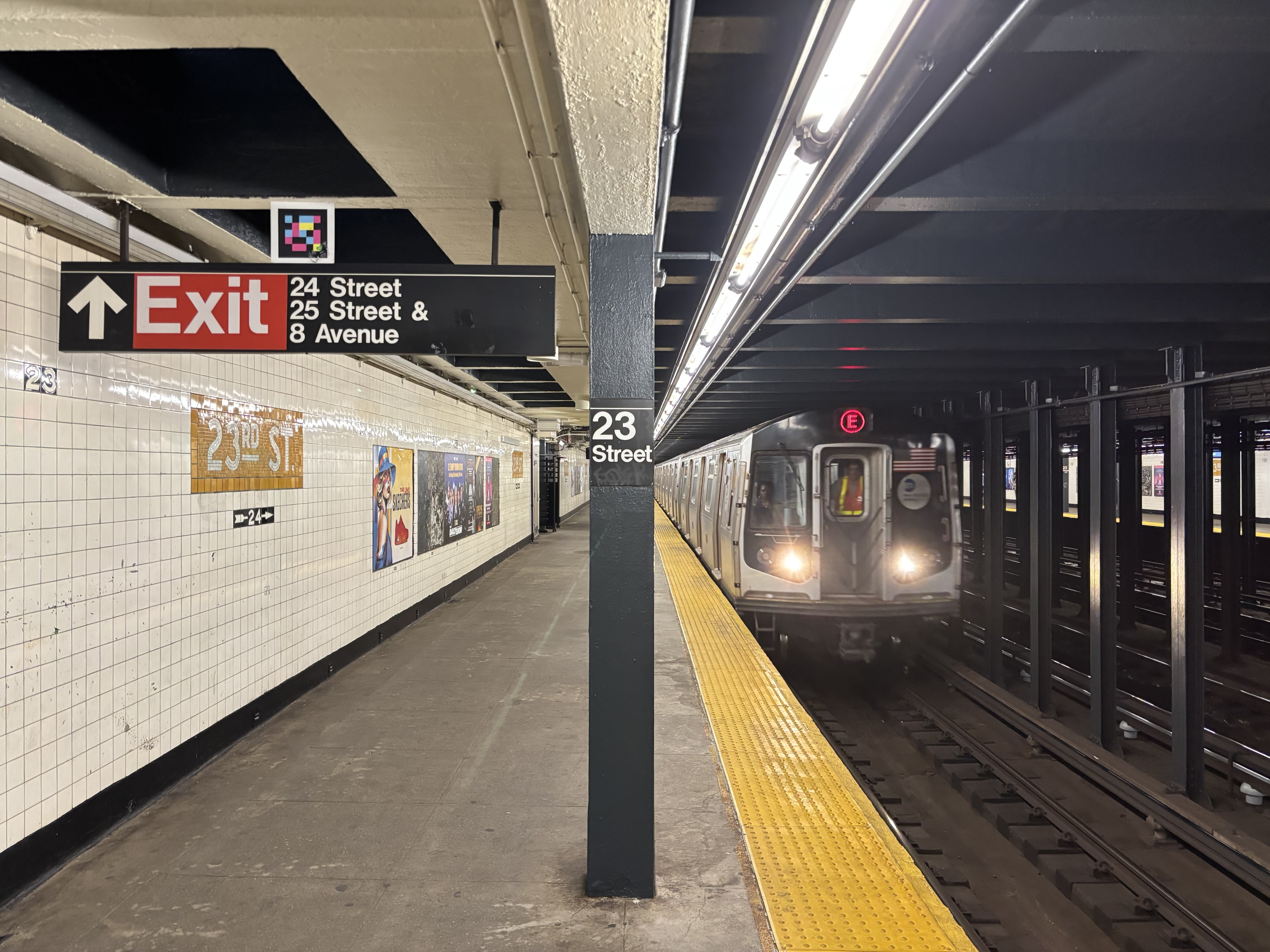
- R160 E train arriving at the southbound platform

Station statistics
- Address: West 23rd Street & Eighth Avenue; New York, New York
- Borough: Manhattan
- Locale: Chelsea
- Coordinates: 40.745274°N 73.998499°W
- Division: B (IND)
- Line: IND Eighth Avenue Line
- Services: A (late nights); C (all except late nights); E (all times)
- Transit: NYCT Bus: M20, M23 SBS
- Structure: Underground
- Platforms: 2 side platforms
- Tracks: 4

Other information
- Opened: September 10, 1932 (94 years ago)
- Accessible: No; planned

Traffic
- 2025: 5,098,705 ▲3.9%
- Rank: 59 out of 423
Services
Preceding station	New York City Subway	Following station
34th Street–Penn Station A C E via 50th Street	Local	14th Street A C E via Canal Street
Location
Location within New York City Subway
Location within New York City
Location within New York
Track layout
Street map
Station service legend
Symbol	Description
Stops all times except late nights	Stops all times except late nights
Stops all times	Stops all times
Stops late nights only	Stops late nights only

The 23rd Street station is a local station on the IND Eighth Avenue Line of the New York City Subway, located at the intersection of 23rd Street and Eighth Avenue in Chelsea, Manhattan. It is served by the E train at all times, and by the C train at all times except late nights, when the A train takes over service.

== History ==
New York City mayor John Francis Hylan's original plans for the Independent Subway System (IND), proposed in 1922, included building over 100 miles (160 km) of new lines and taking over nearly 100 miles (160 km) of existing lines. The lines were designed to compete with the existing underground, surface, and elevated lines operated by the Interborough Rapid Transit Company (IRT) and Brooklyn–Manhattan Transit Corporation (BMT). On December 9, 1924, the New York City Board of Transportation (BOT) gave preliminary approval for the construction of the IND Eighth Avenue Line. This line consisted of a corridor connecting Inwood, Manhattan, to Downtown Brooklyn, running largely under Eighth Avenue but also paralleling Greenwich Avenue and Sixth Avenue in Lower Manhattan. The BOT announced a list of stations on the new line in February 1928, with a local station at 23rd Street.

Most of the Eighth Avenue Line was dug using a cheap cut-and-cover method. The finishes at the four stations between 14th and 42nd Street were 21 percent completed by May 1930. By that August, the BOT reported that the Eighth Avenue Line was nearly completed and that the four stations from 14th to 42nd Street were 99.8 percent completed. The entire line was completed by September 1931, except for the installation of turnstiles.

A preview event for the new subway was hosted on September 8, 1932, two days before the official opening. The 23rd Street station opened on September 10, 1932, as part of the city-operated IND's initial segment, the Eighth Avenue Line between Chambers Street and 207th Street. When the station opened, it was served by local AA trains. When the IND Concourse Line opened on July 1, 1933, all locals became CC trains to the Concourse Line. The E began using the local tracks on August 19, 1933, when the IND Queens Boulevard Line opened.

As part of its 2025–2029 Capital Program, the MTA has proposed making the station wheelchair-accessible in compliance with the Americans with Disabilities Act of 1990.

== Station layout ==
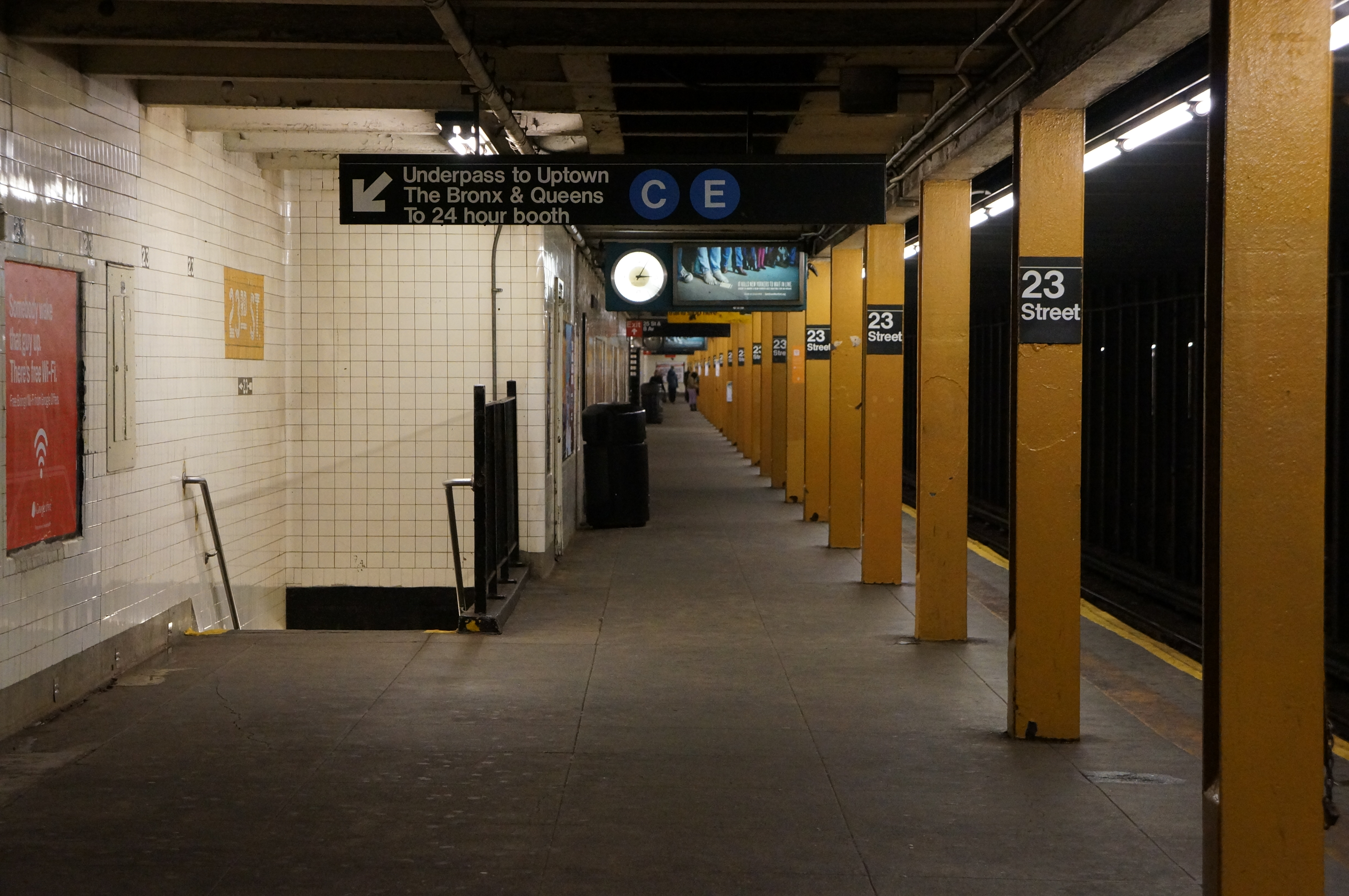
Crossunder on the southbound platform

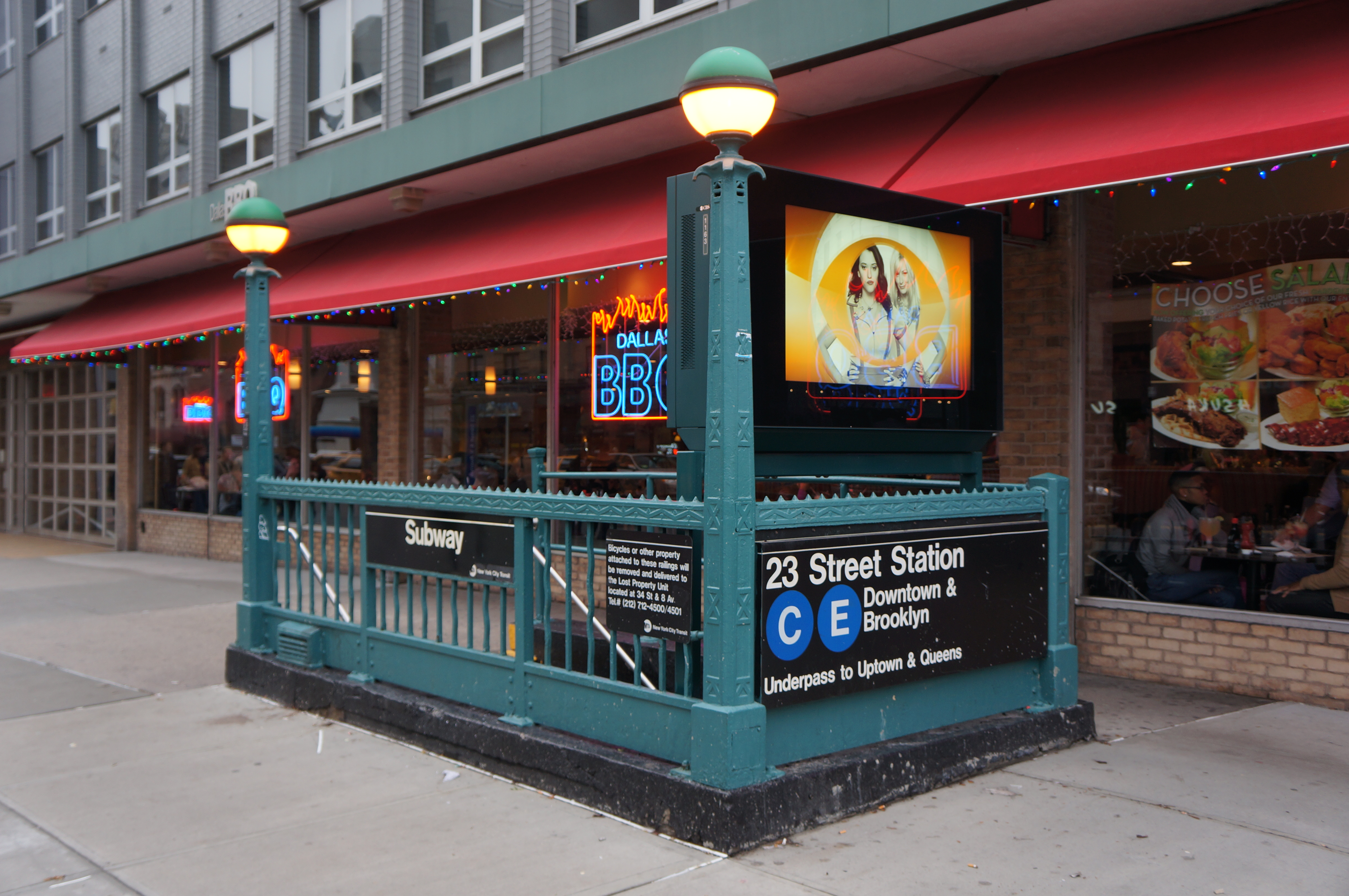
Western entrance

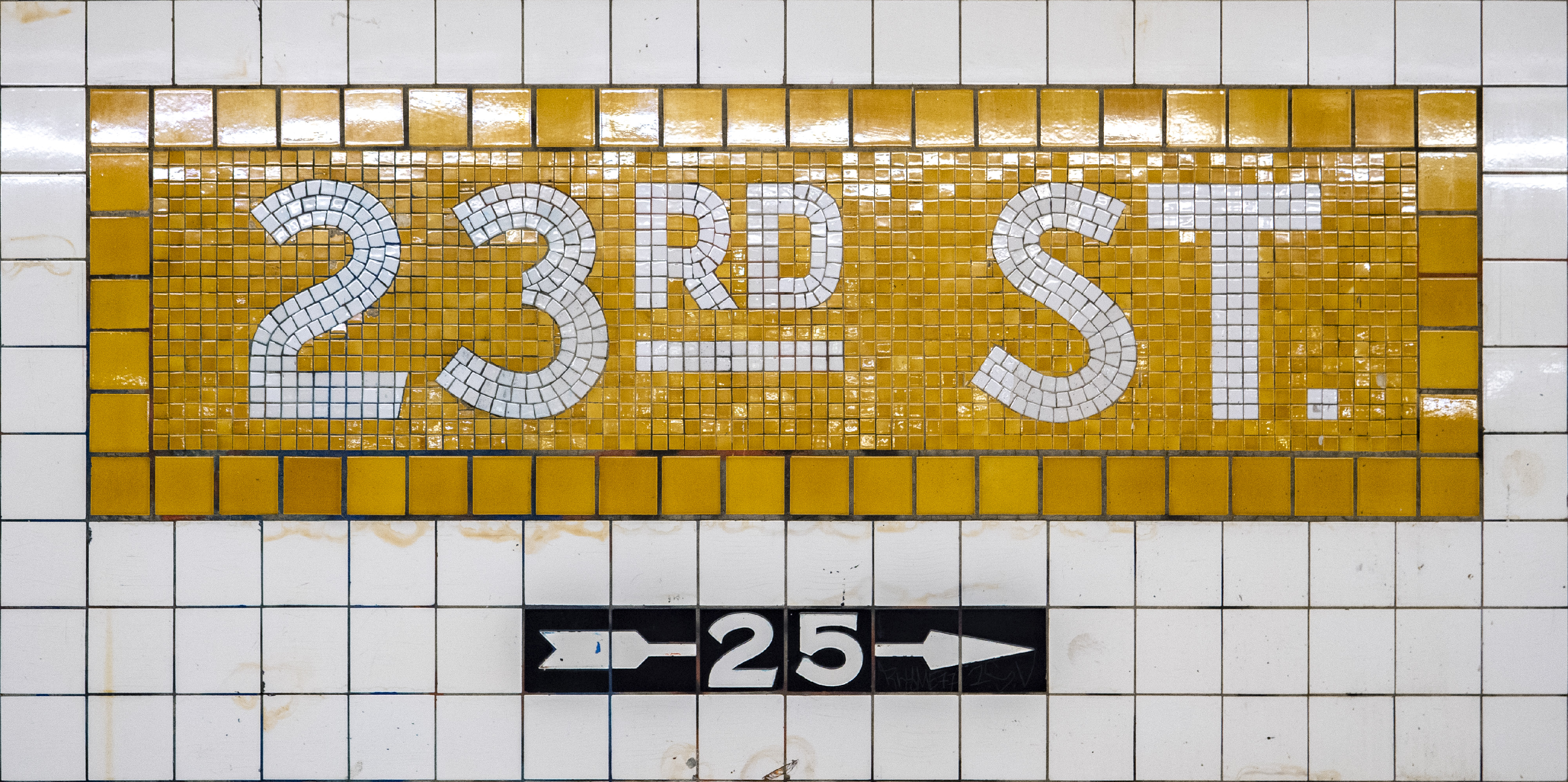
Mosaic name tablet

This underground station contains four tracks and two side platforms. The two center tracks are used by the A express train during daytime hours. Just north of this station, a storage track begins between the two express tracks. This track runs north and stub-ends at the south end of the center platform at 34th Street–Penn Station.

There is no trim line in this station, but both platform walls have mosaic name tablets reading "23RD ST." in white sans-serif lettering on a yellow background and same yellow border. Small "23" tile captions in white numbering on a black background run along the walls, and directional signs in the same format are present below some of the name tablets. Yellow I-beam columns run along the platforms at regular intervals, alternating ones having the standard black station name plate with white lettering.

The station was planned to be renovated as part of the 2010–2014 MTA Capital Program. An MTA study conducted in 2014 found that 40% of station components were out of date. In 2015–2016, two of the staircases were renovated. The MTA undertook design studies in the 2015–2019 MTA Capital Program, but deferred actual construction.

23rd St subway cross-section
8th Av	7th Av	6th Av			5th Av & Broadway	Park Av
A / C / E	1 / 2 / 3	FM↓	PATH	FM↑	N / Q / R / W	6 / <6>
underpass		underpass

=== Exits ===
All fare controls are on platform level. The full-time ones are at the south end of the station, at 23rd Street. Each entrance and exit has a turnstile bank, token booth, and two staircases to the street. The northbound side leads to either eastern corner of 23rd Street and Eighth Avenue and the southbound side leads to either western corner. A crossunder within fare control at the 23rd Street end connects both platforms.

Each platform has an exit-only at the center, at 24th Street. Two High Entry-Exit Turnstiles lead to a small mezzanine, where a single staircase goes up to the streets. The northbound side leads to the southeast corner of 24th Street and 8th Avenue, and the southbound side to the northwest corner.

Both platforms have another fare control area at their north ends, at 25th Street, that require going up a short flight of stairs to reach. Though open at all times, they are unstaffed, containing HEET turnstiles without a token booth. Each entrance here has two street stairs, the northbound side to either eastern corner of 25th Street and Eighth Avenue and the southbound side to either western corner. The crossunder here is closed.
