= 23rd Street station (IND Sixth Avenue Line) =

New York City Subway station in Manhattan

23 Street
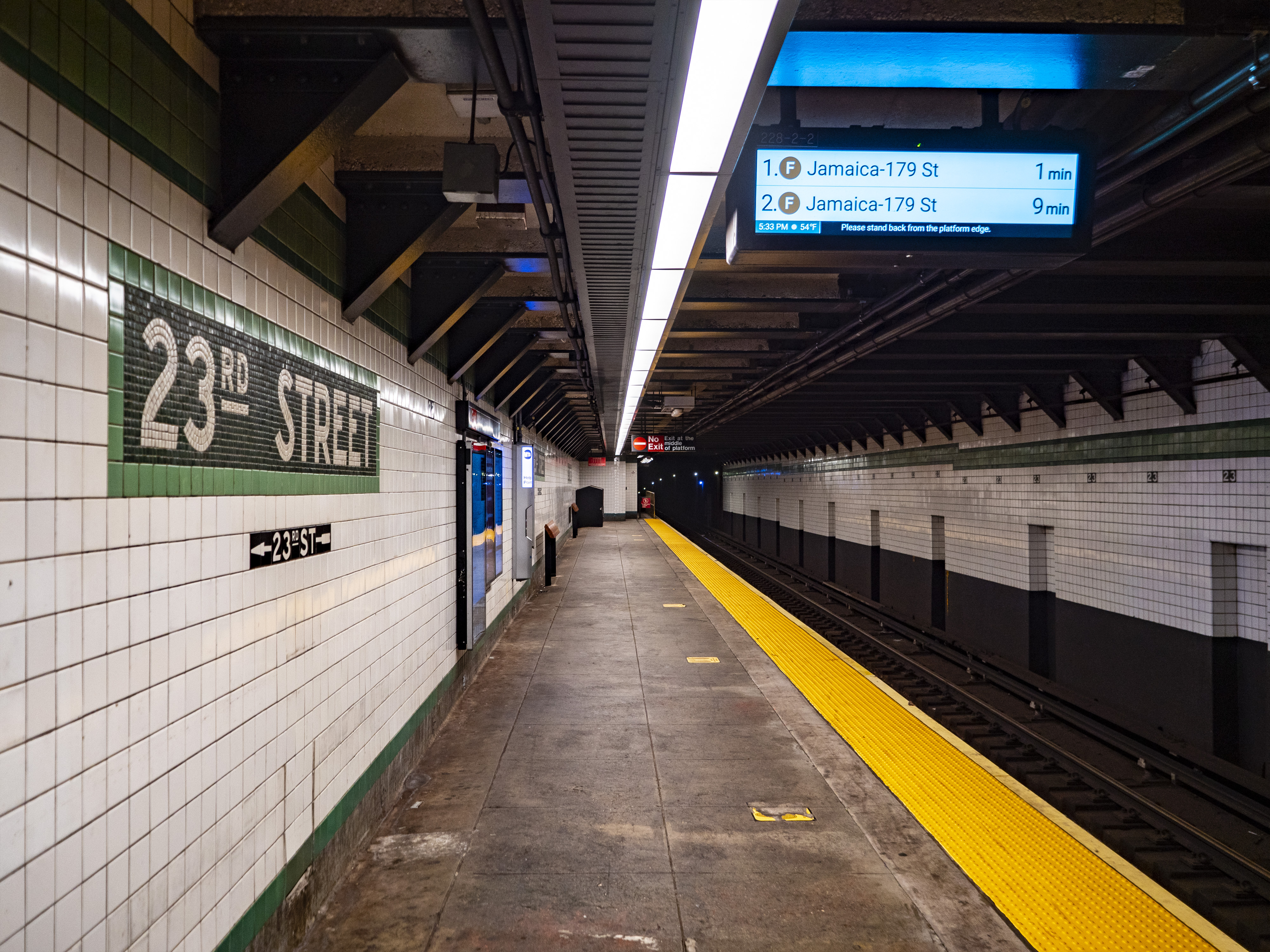
- Northbound platform

Station statistics
- Address: West 23rd Street & Sixth Avenue; New York, New York
- Borough: Manhattan
- Locale: Chelsea, Flatiron District
- Coordinates: 40.742933°N 73.992877°W
- Division: B (IND)
- Line: IND Sixth Avenue Line
- Services: F (all times) <F> (two rush hour trains, peak direction); M (weekdays during the day)
- Transit: NYCT Bus: M7, M23 SBS, M55, X27, X28, SIM1C, SIM3, SIM3C, SIM10; PATH: JSQ–33, HOB–33, JSQ–33 (via HOB) (at 23rd Street)
- Structure: Underground
- Platforms: 2 side platforms
- Tracks: 2

Other information
- Opened: December 15, 1940 (85 years ago)
- Closed: July 23, 2018; 8 years ago (reconstruction)
- Rebuilt: November 29, 2018; 7 years ago

Traffic
- 2025: 6,335,334 ▲6.9%
- Rank: 41 out of 423
Services
Preceding station	New York City Subway	Following station
34th Street–Herald Square F <F> M via 47th–50th Streets–Rockefeller Center	Local	14th Street F <F> M via Broadway–Lafayette Street
and do not stop here
Location
Location within New York City Subway
Location within New York City
Location within New York
Track layout
Street map
Station service legend
Symbol	Description
Stops all times	Stops all times
Stops all times except late nights	Stops all times except late nights
Stops rush hours in the peak direction only (limited service)	Stops rush hours in the peak direction only (limited service)
Stops weekdays during the day	Stops weekdays during the day

The 23rd Street station is a local station on the IND Sixth Avenue Line of the New York City Subway, located at the intersection of 23rd Street and Sixth Avenue (Avenue of the Americas) in Manhattan. It is served by the F train at all times, the M train during weekdays, and the <F> train during rush hours in the peak direction.

The 23rd Street station of the IND Sixth Avenue Line shares entrances with the 23rd Street station of the PATH, which is located in between this station's two platforms.

== History ==
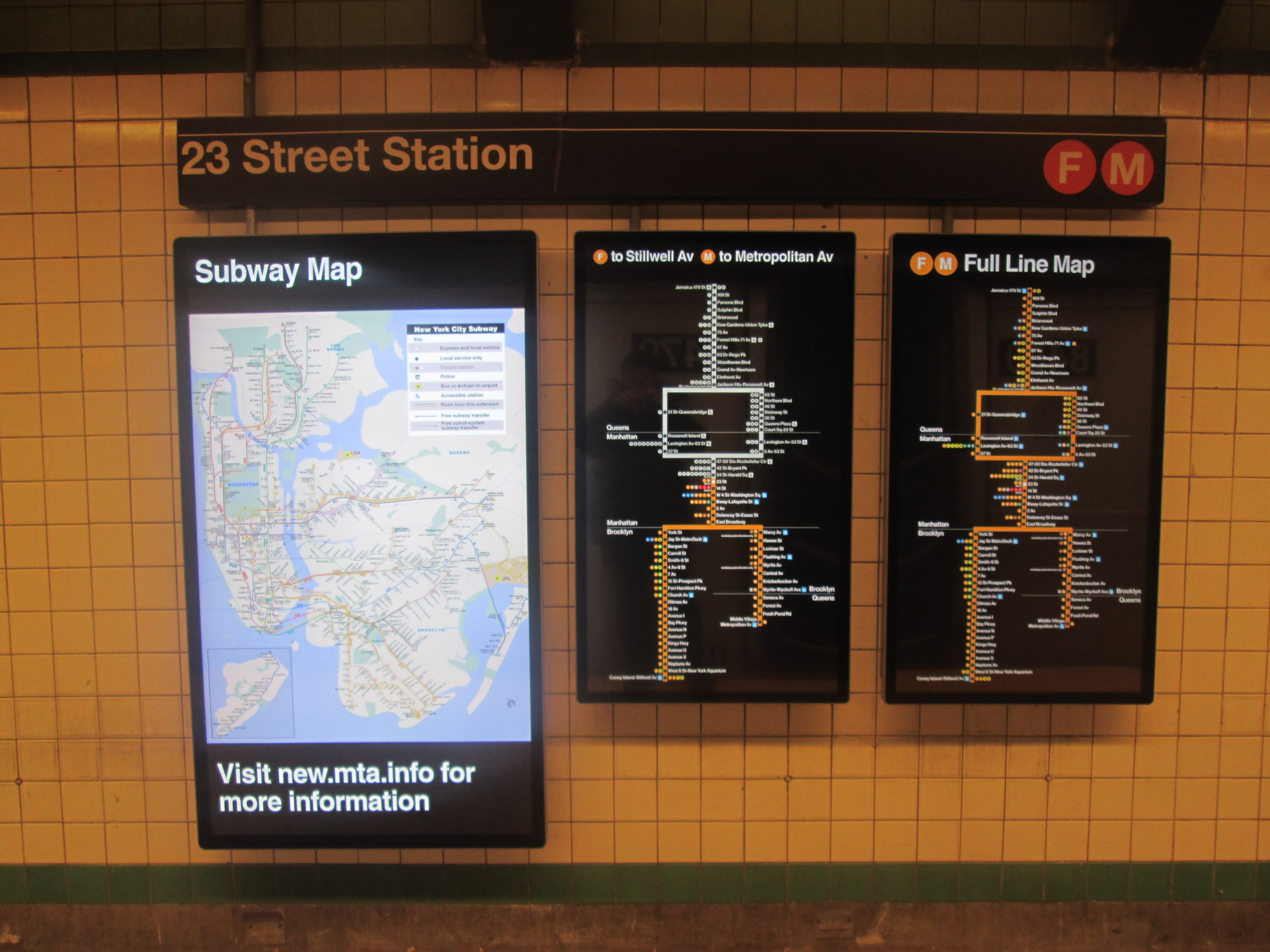
Digital maps/noticeboards on station wall

In 1924, the Independent Subway System (IND) submitted its list of proposed subway routes to the New York City Board of Transportation, which included the construction of the IND Sixth Avenue Line. The Board approved the program. As part of the construction of the line, the Hudson and Manhattan Railroad's (now PATH) 23rd Street station had to be rebuilt to provide space for the Sixth Avenue Line's 23rd Street stop, which was to be built at the same level as the Hudson and Manhattan's stop. In 1937, the James McCreery Realty Company, the owner of a building at the southeastern corner of 23rd Street and Sixth Avenue, granted the IND the right to build two staircases outside that building.

This station opened on December 15, 1940, as local subway service began on Sixth Avenue from the West Fourth Street subway station to the 47th–50th Streets station, with track connections to the IND 53rd Street Line. The Sixth Avenue Line's construction cost $59.5 million. Service was originally provided by the D, which ran between Norwood–205th Street and Hudson Terminal, and the F, which ran between Parsons Boulevard and Church Avenue. This station replaced the 23rd Street station on the elevated IRT Sixth Avenue Line, which remained open while construction on the Sixth Avenue subway proceeded, but closed in December 1938.

Ground was broken for two new express tracks between the West Fourth Street and 34th Street–Herald Square stations on April 19, 1961. The express tracks were built 80 feet (24 m) beneath the surface. The construction was done in two portions. The first section was between West 9th and 19th Streets, and the second section was between West 19th and 31st Streets. Although the express tracks, which went into service in 1967, do not serve this station, provisions were incorporated into the design of the tunnel to permit the addition of a future lower level station here without disturbances to train operation.

Under the 2015–2019 MTA Capital Plan, this station, along with 32 others, underwent a complete overhaul as part of the Enhanced Station Initiative. Updates included cellular service, Wi-Fi, USB charging stations, interactive service advisories and maps, improved signage, and improved station lighting. In January 2018, the NYCT and Bus Committee recommended that Judlau Contracting receive the $125 million contract for the renovations of 57th and 23rd Streets on the IND Sixth Avenue Line; 28th Street on the IRT Lexington Avenue Line, and 34th Street–Penn Station on the IRT Broadway–Seventh Avenue Line and IND Eighth Avenue Line. However, the MTA Board temporarily deferred the vote for these packages after city representatives refused to vote to award the contracts. The contract was put back for a vote in February, where it was ultimately approved. The subway station was closed for renovations on July 23, 2018, and reopened slightly ahead of schedule on November 29, 2018. Access to the PATH station was retained during the renovation via the street stairs on the southern side of the station, which are owned by the Port Authority; hence, those entrances were not renovated.

== Station layout ==
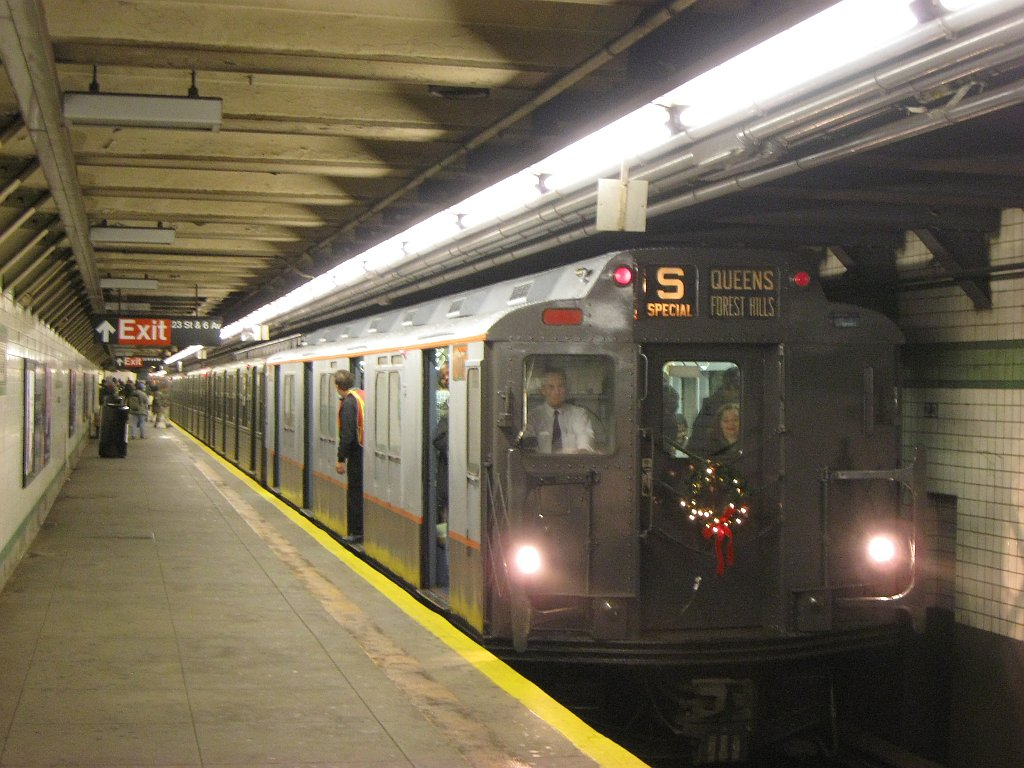
Holiday Train at the station

This underground station has two tracks and two side platforms. No crossover, crossunder, or mezzanine exists to allow a free transfer between directions. The PATH tracks, which were built 40 years before the Sixth Avenue Line, are behind the trackway walls where there would typically be the express tracks. The Sixth Avenue PATH tracks are on top of the express tracks used by the B and D, which were constructed in the mid-1960s using a "deep-bore" tunneling method and both sets of tracks are not visible from the platforms. A green trim line with a darker green border runs along both track walls, and appears to be obscured by support beams directly underneath 23rd Street. A similar trim line is present on the platforms walls, though is higher and thus is regularly obscured by the angled ceiling supports. The platform walls also have mosaic name tablets reading "23RD STREET" in white sans serif lettering on a dark green background and lighter green border. Small tile captions reading "23" in white lettering on black run below both trim lines.

On the express tracks on the lower level, the deep-bore tunnel's round shape becomes square below this station and at 14th Street, where provisions for lower level platforms were built.

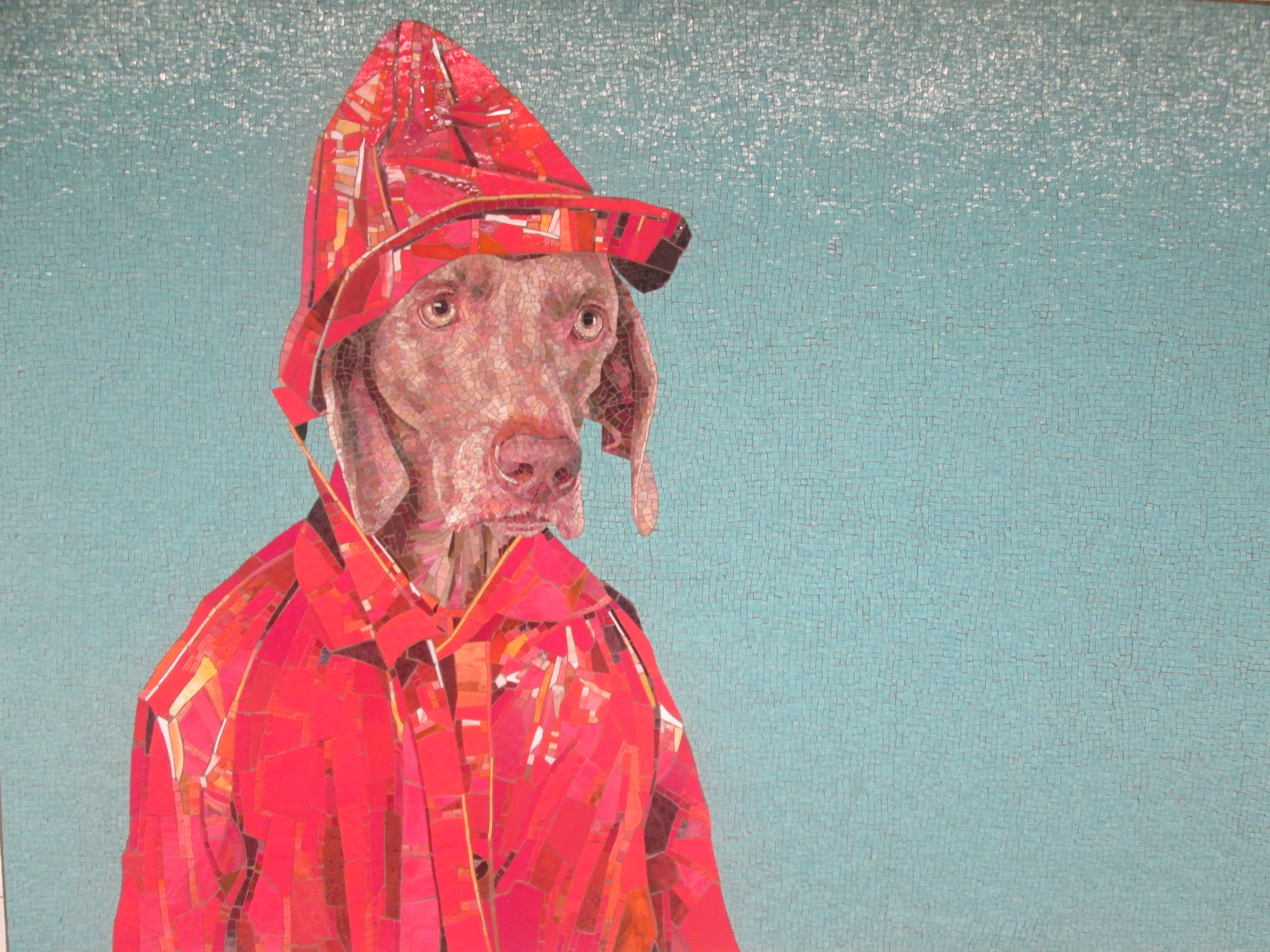
Stationary Figures

The 2018 artwork at this station is Stationary Figures by William Wegman. It is composed of 11 glass tile mosaics of Wegman's Weimaraners (a breed of dogs), each of which is wearing different attire.

23rd St subway cross-section
8th Av	7th Av	6th Av			5th Av & Broadway	Park Av
A / C / E	1 / 2 / 3	FM↓	PATH	FM↑	N / Q / R / W	6 / <6>
underpass		underpass

=== Exits ===
The northbound platform has exits on the east side of 23rd Street and Sixth Avenue, while the southbound platform has exits to the west side. Each side of the station has four street staircases on the corresponding side of Sixth Avenue, two to each corner. The station also features direct indoor entrances to the 23rd Street PATH station on both sides; the northbound platform has a direct entrance to the 33rd Street-bound PATH, while the southbound platform has a direct entrance to the New Jersey-bound PATH.

The southern entrances on each side contain simple gray steel fences and are maintained by the Port Authority of New York and New Jersey, PATH's operator, rather than the Metropolitan Transportation Authority, the New York City Subway's operator. The southern entrances appear to be part of the original PATH station, which was built in 1911. The northern entrances on each side contain green-metal fences that are standard to the New York City Subway, with countdown clocks showing the time until the next train arrives. One of the two entrances on each side contain black slabs with digital maps of the surrounding neighborhood, as well as a lighted green bar at the top of the slabs.

Combined New York City Subway and PATH entrances at 23rd Street and Sixth Avenue
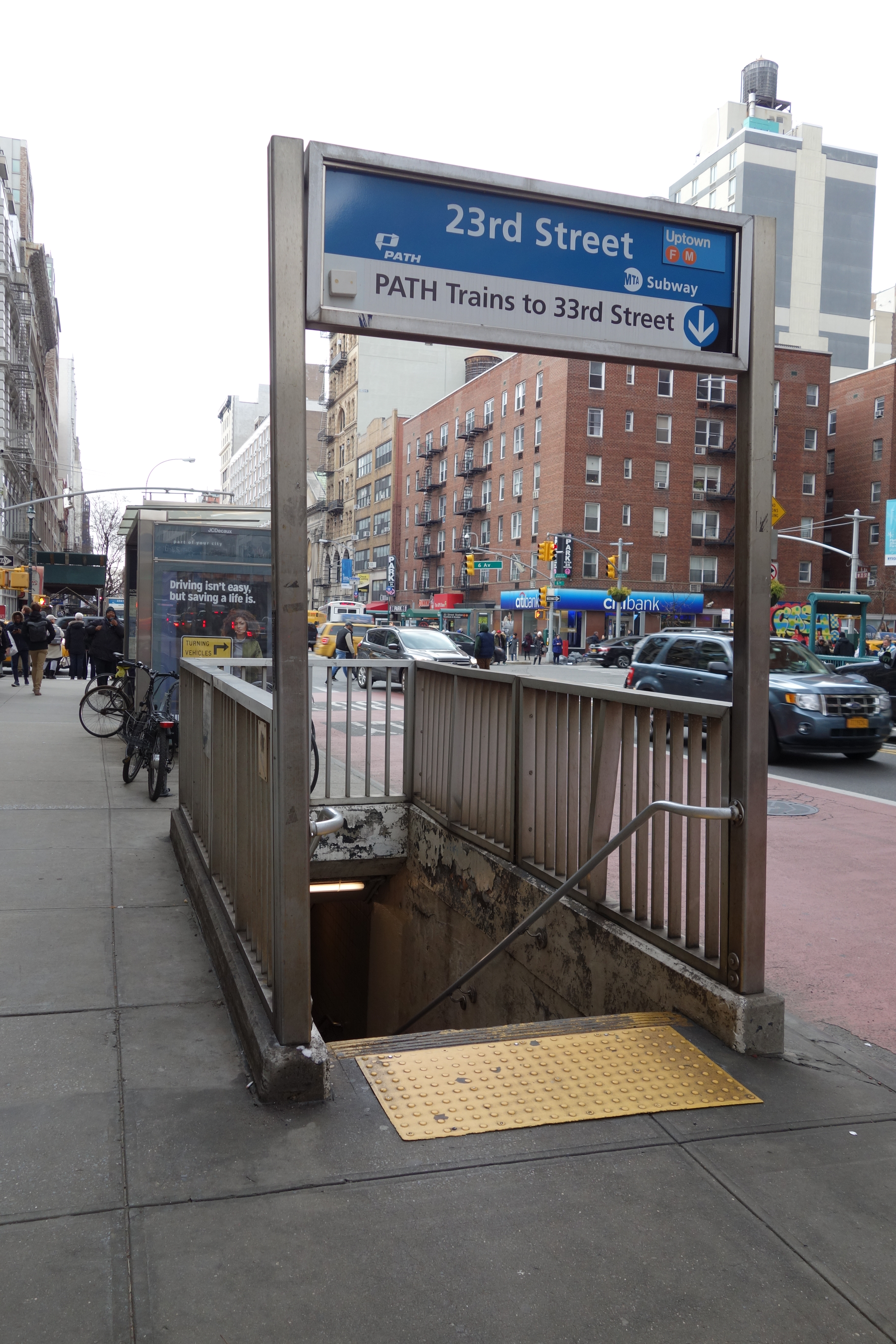
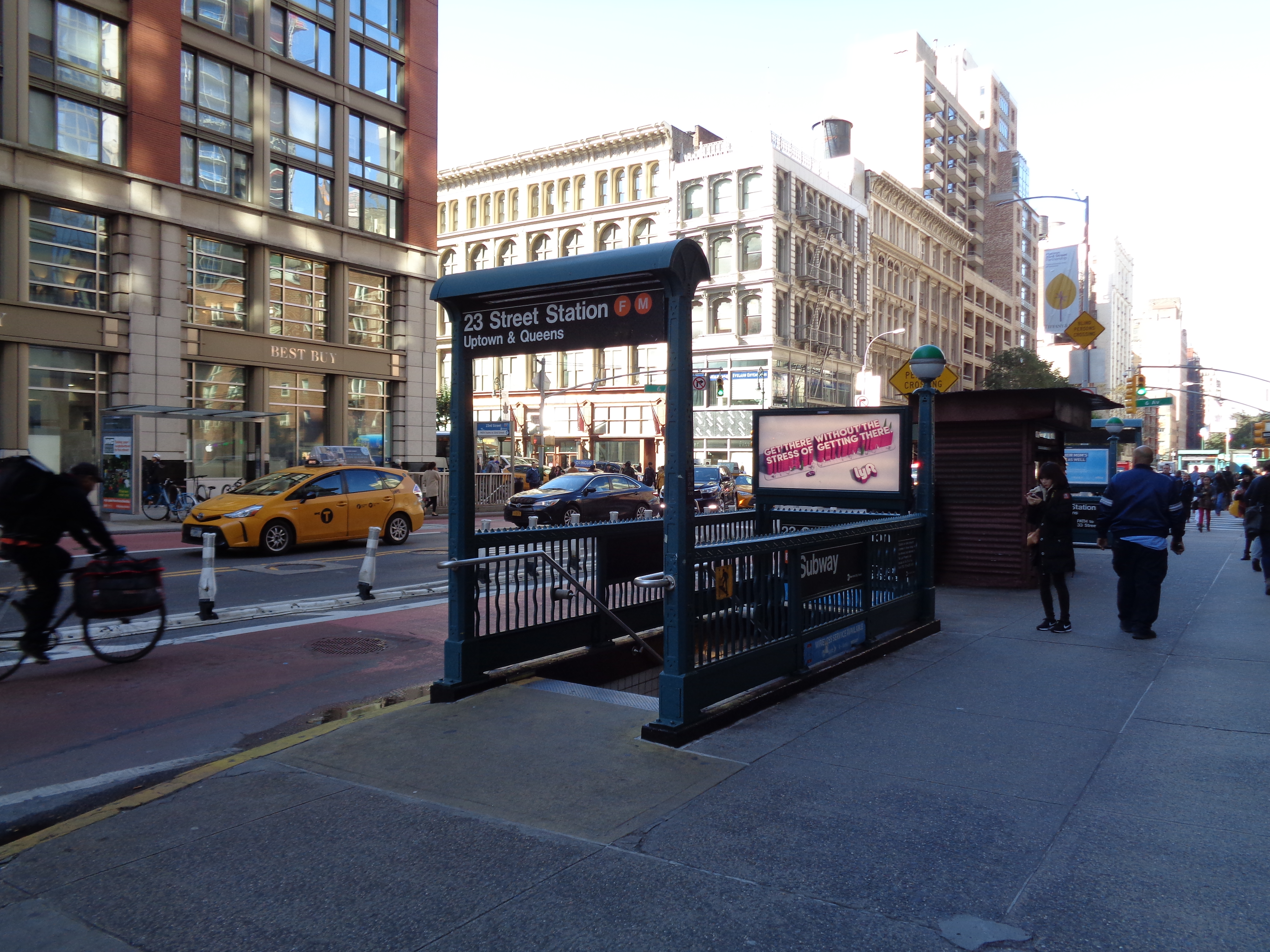
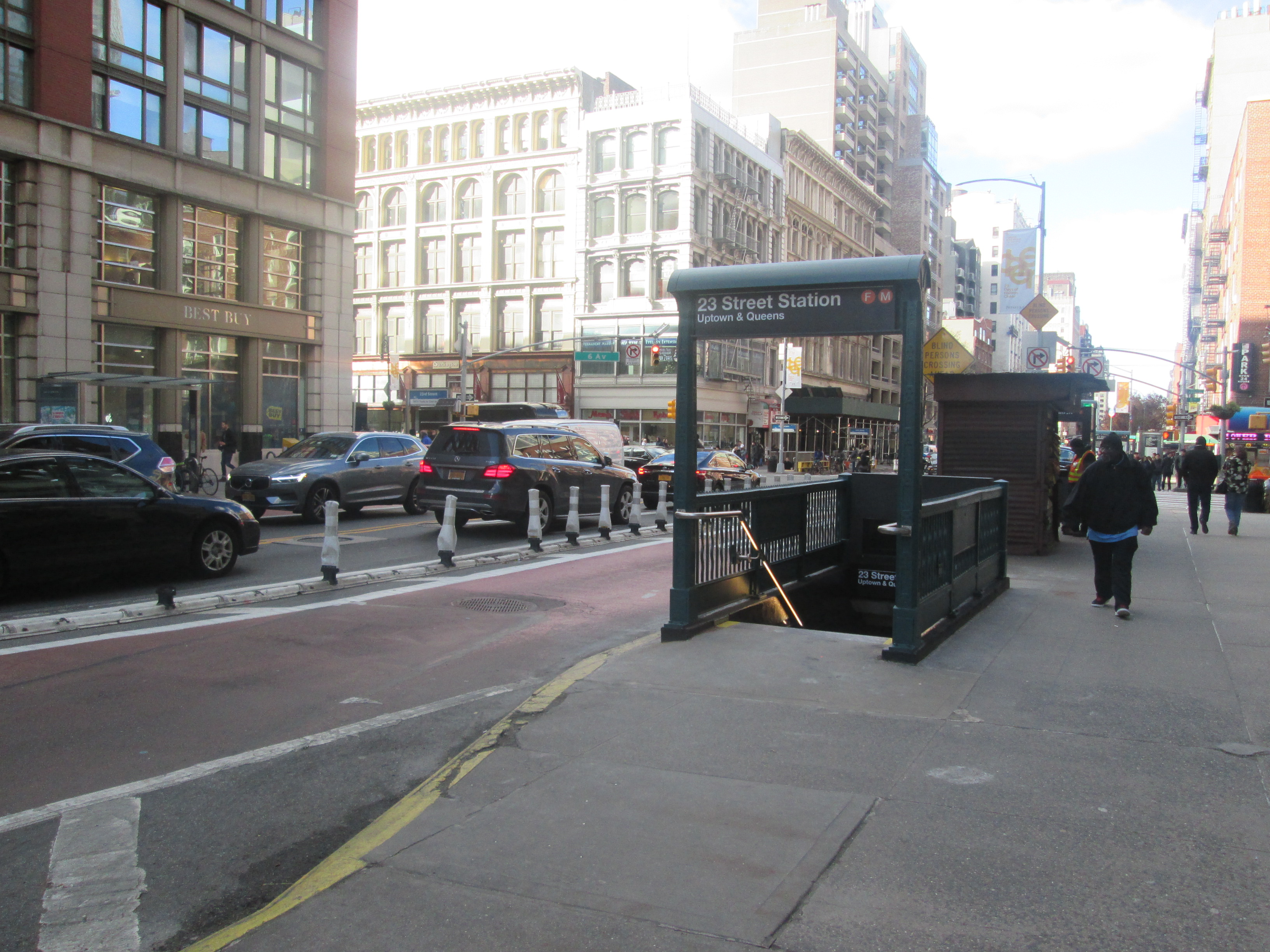
From left to right:
- Southeast corner entrance, seen in 2017
- Northeast corner entrance, seen in 2017
- Northeast corner entrance, seen in 2018 after 2015–2019 Capital Program renovation

The station is near the Flatiron Building, Madison Square Park, Metropolitan Life Insurance Company Tower, and New York Life Insurance Building.
