= Journal Square–33rd Street =

Rapid transit service in New Jersey and New York City

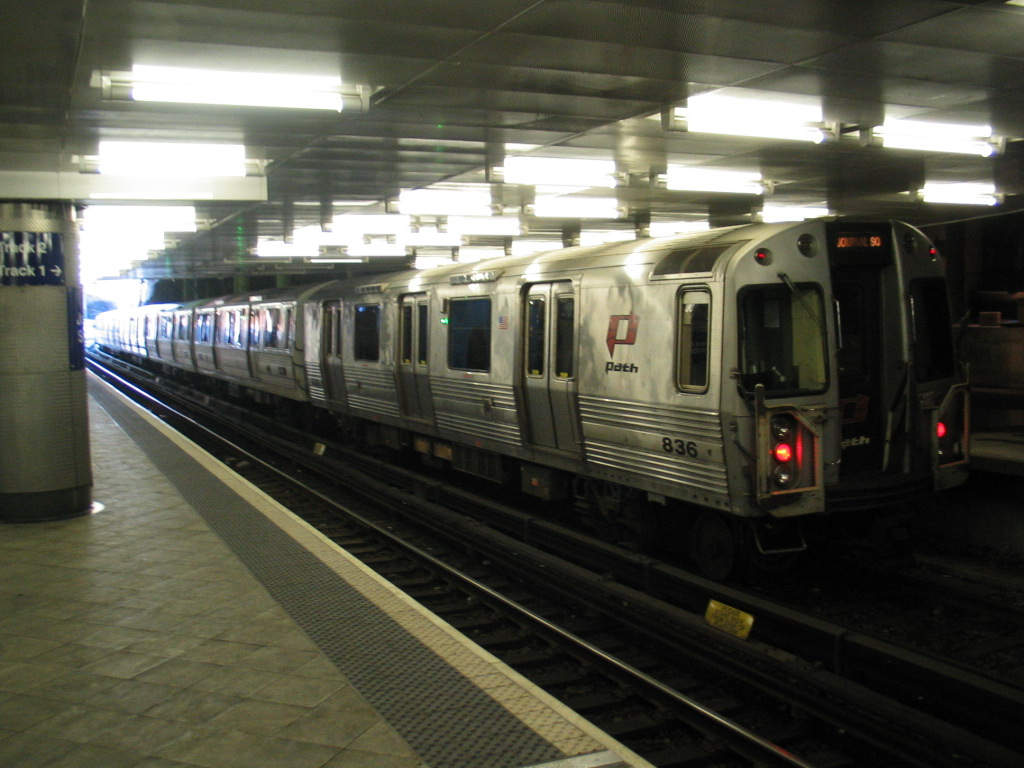
- Train at the Journal Square station in 2007

Overview
- Status: Operates 6 a.m. to 11 p.m. weekdays and 10 a.m. to 9 p.m. weekends
- Owner: Port Authority of New York and New Jersey
- Locale: Hudson County, New Jersey and Manhattan, New York
- Termini: Journal Square; 33rd Street
- Stations: 8

Service
- Type: Rapid transit
- System: PATH
- Rolling stock: PA5

History
- Opened: September 6, 1910

Technical
- Line length: 5.7 miles (9.2 km)
- Character: Surface and underground
- Track gauge: 4 ft 8 1/2 in (1,435 mm) standard gauge
- Electrification: Third rail, 600 V DC
- Operating speed: 55 mph (89 km/h)

Journal Square–33rd Street is a rapid transit service operated by the Port Authority Trans-Hudson (PATH). It is colored yellow on the PATH service map and trains on this service display yellow marker lights. This service operates from Journal Square in Jersey City, New Jersey by way of the Uptown Hudson Tubes to 33rd Street in Midtown Manhattan, New York. The 5.7-mile (9.2 km) trip takes 22 minutes to complete.

== History ==
The Journal Square–33rd Street service originated as the Grove Street–33rd Street service operated by the Hudson and Manhattan Railroad (H&M). It started operating between Grove Street in Jersey City, New Jersey and 33rd Street in Manhattan, beginning September 6, 1910. The Newark–Hudson Terminal line between Hudson Terminal and Grove Street also started operating at this time. The Newark line was extended to Manhattan Transfer on October 1, 1911, then subsequently expanded again. A stop at Summit Avenue (now Journal Square), located between Grove Street and Manhattan Transfer, opened on April 14, 1912, as an infill station on the Newark–Hudson Terminal line. The Summit Avenue station was completed on February 23, 1913, allowing service from 33rd Street to terminate there.

The 28th Street station was closed in September 1939 during the construction of the IND Sixth Avenue Line in Manhattan, and the 19th Street station was closed on August 1, 1954. The H&M itself was succeeded by Port Authority Trans-Hudson (PATH) in 1962.

After the September 11 attacks destroyed the World Trade Center station, service on the Journal Square–33rd Street line was suspended during overnight hours, with all service provided by the Newark–33rd Street via Hoboken branch. When the Exchange Place station reopened in June 2003, the Newark–33rd Street via Hoboken branch was truncated to Journal Square, but operated during weekends as well. It was renamed the Journal Square–33rd Street (via Hoboken) branch.

After Hurricane Sandy flooded the PATH system in October 2012, service on the line was suspended. For most of November, trains ran between Newark Penn Station and 33rd Street. The Journal Square–33rd Street line was temporarily extended to cover service on the Newark–World Trade Center line, which was suspended. Regular service on the line between Journal Square and 33rd Street was resumed on November 26, 2012, but full service would not be restored until early 2013. During the first few weeks of service after the hurricane, the stations at Christopher Street and 9th Street were closed due to overcrowding concerns.

The service was temporarily running full time from January to February 2025, as Hoboken station was closed for repairs. In November 2025, the PANYNJ announced that the Journal Square–33rd Street route would begin running on weekends between 10 a.m. and 9 p.m. every 10 minutes starting on May 17, 2026, as trains to and from Journal Square would skip Hoboken. The Hoboken–33rd Street route would also begin running on weekends even 10 minutes, effectively splitting the Journal Square–33rd Street (via Hoboken) line into two routes.

== Station listing ==
Station	Location	Connections
Journal Square	Jersey City, NJ	PATH: NWK-WTC; NJ Transit Bus, R&T Bus
Grove Street	Jersey City, NJ	PATH: NWK-WTC; NJ Transit Bus, R&T Bus
Newport	Jersey City, NJ	PATH: HOB-WTC; Hudson–Bergen Light Rail; NJT Bus, Academy Bus
Christopher Street	New York, NY	PATH: HOB-33; NYC Subway: NYCT Bus
Ninth Street	New York, NY	PATH: HOB-33; NYC Subway: NYCT Bus
14th Street	New York, NY	PATH: HOB-33; NYC Subway: NYCT Bus
23rd Street	New York, NY	PATH: HOB-33; NYC Subway: NYCT Bus
33rd Street	New York, NY	PATH: HOB-33; NYC Subway: NYCT Bus
