= Newport station (PATH) =

Port Authority Trans-Hudson rail station

Newport
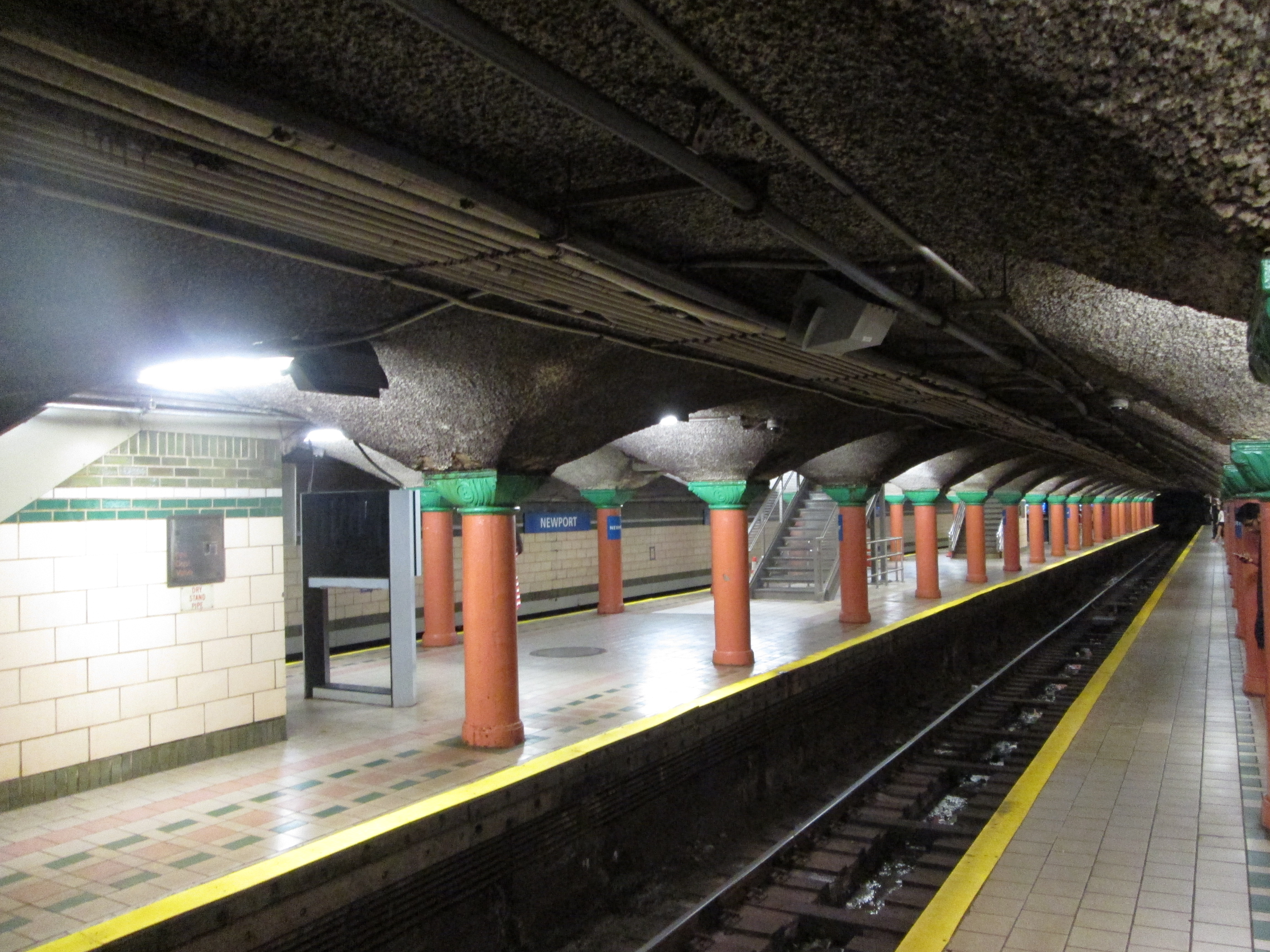
- The underground station platform in 2013

General information
- Location: Washington Boulevard and Town Square Place; Newport, Jersey City, New Jersey
- Coordinates: 40.726676°N 74.034757°W
- Owner: Port Authority of New York and New Jersey
- Platforms: 1 island platform (southbound); 1 side platform (northbound)
- Tracks: 2
- Connections: HBLR at Newport; NJ Transit Bus: 9, 16, 63, 64, 68, 86, 126; Academy Bus

Construction
- Parking: Paid parking nearby
- Accessible: Yes

History
- Opened: 1909; 117 years ago
- Former names: Erie (1909–1962); Pavonia Avenue (1962–1988); Pavonia/Newport (1988–2010)

Passengers
- 2025: 3,820,200 ▲3.9%
- Rank: 8 of 13

Services
Preceding station	PATH	Following station
Hoboken Terminus	HOB–WTC	Exchange Place toward World Trade Center
Grove Street toward Journal Square	JSQ–33	Christopher Street toward 33rd Street
Late-nights
Grove Street toward Journal Square	JSQ–33 (via HOB)	Hoboken toward 33rd Street
Track layout
Location

Newport station (at different times known as Erie, Pavonia Avenue, or Pavonia–Newport) is a station on the PATH system. Located on Town Square Place (formerly Pavonia Avenue) at the corner of Washington Boulevard in the Newport neighborhood of Jersey City, New Jersey, it is served by the Hoboken–World Trade Center and Journal Square–33rd Street lines at all times except nights, and by the Journal Square–33rd Street (via Hoboken) line at night and on weekend mornings. As of 2017, its estimated weekday use was nearly 20,000 passengers, up from 17,000 to 18,000 average weekday passengers in 2010.

== History ==
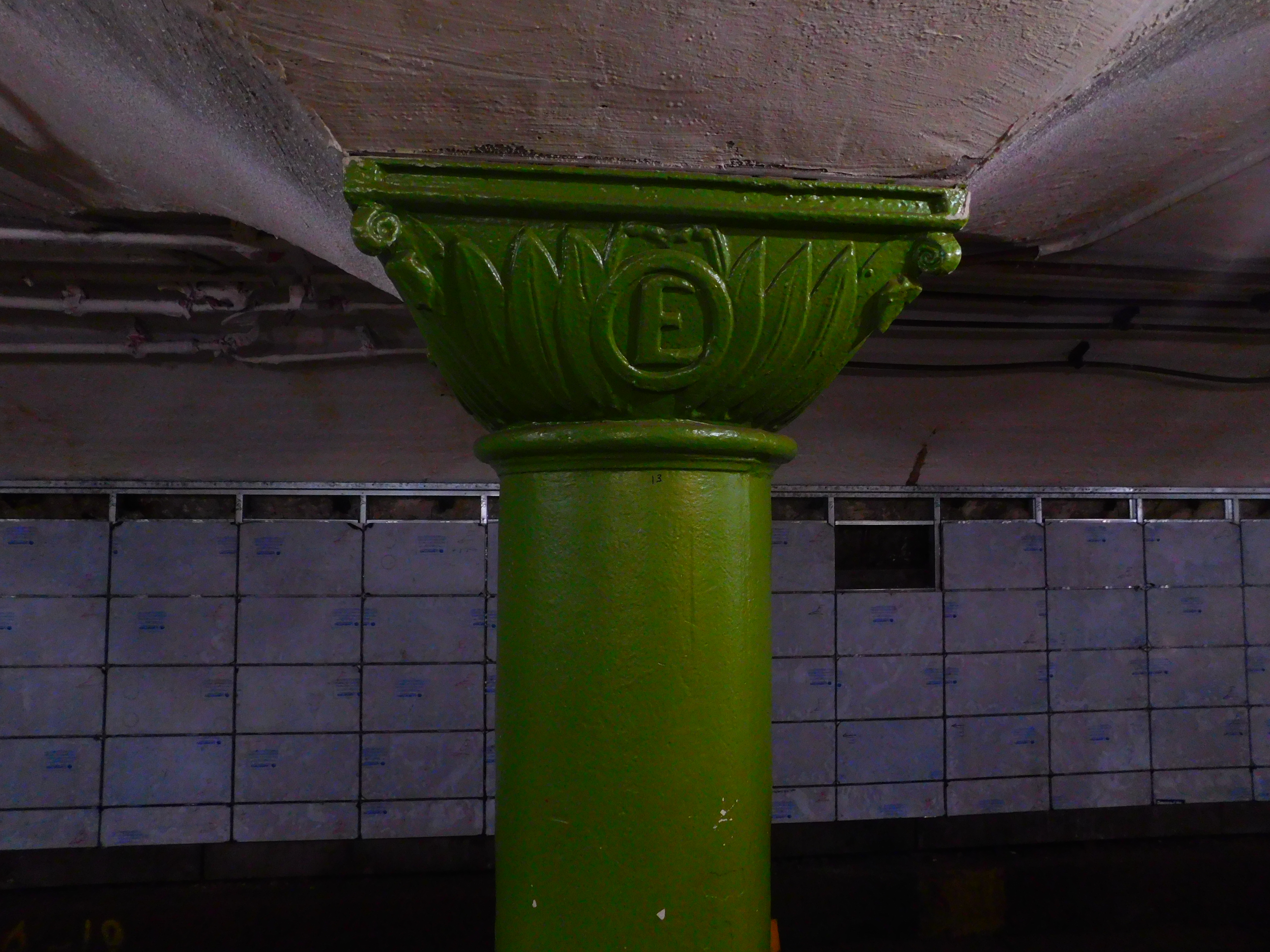
The pillars at Newport station with "E", denoting the former Erie Railroad terminal

The station was opened on August 2, 1909, as part of the Hudson and Manhattan Railroad (H&M), originally constructed to connect to the Erie Railroad's Pavonia Terminal. The capitals of the station's columns are adorned with the "E", and recall its original name, Erie. After the Port Authority of New York and New Jersey 1960s takeover of the system, the station was renamed Pavonia, or Pavonia Avenue, itself named for the 17th New Netherland settlement of Pavonia. In 1988, the station became known as Pavonia/Newport to reflect the redevelopment of the former railyards along the banks of the Hudson River to residential, retail, and recreational uses as Newport. In 2010, the name became Newport.

The station has undergone a number of transformations. During the Erie period, the station was so busy that a second platform was added to manage the flow of passengers from the over 30 passenger trains that ran in and out of the station hourly. The desire to reuse old caissons (from previous tunneling attempts) when building the H&M system meant that the tubes at this location were far inland. As a result, the actual station was not closely integrated into the Erie Railroad Terminal above, and the Erie never built a new terminal on top of the underground platforms. Therefore, a lengthy walk through inclined pedestrian tunnels was necessary in order to connect from the H&M to the passenger trains. In response to this, in 1954, the Hudson and Manhattan Railroad installed a 277-foot (84 m) long moving sidewalk known as "the Speedwalk". It was the first such moving walkway built in the United States; built by Goodyear, it moved up a 10 percent grade at a speed of 1.5 mph (2.4 km/h).

In 1956, the Erie Railroad consolidated its operations with the Lackawanna Railroad and moved to Hoboken Terminal. A few years later, the small New York, Susquehanna and Western Railway ceased operations at the Erie Terminal, which was torn down soon afterwards.

Beginning in the late 1980s, the once-vacant railyards surrounding the station were turned into residential, office, and retail towers, and the neighborhood became known as Newport. As part of the redevelopment, Pavonia Station itself was renamed and underwent extensive renovations, including improved lighting, floors, walls, ceilings, artwork, and the installation of a new headhouse with escalators and elevators.

The station underwent further renovations in 2001–2003 with the installation of an additional elevator in order to re-open the side platform to regular use after four decades of inactivity.

In 2023, a proposal for a 420-foot, 40-story mixed-used high rise on top of the station was announced. The tower will house 423 residential units, including 71 studios, 211 one bedrooms, and 141 two bedrooms. It will feature 3,450 square feet of retail space on the lower floors, and 45,000 square feet of commercial office space. Additionally, the building will include 6,400 square feet of amenity space on the fourth floor, 14,150 square feet of common outdoor space, including a covered patio and roof terrace. The building will include 218 bicycle parking space. The development will also spruce up the area around the station, including new sidewalks, 16 new trees, new landscaping, and seatwalls.

On the morning of August 4, 2025, a train caught fire at the Newport station, hospitalizing several passengers for smoke inhalation conditions.

== Station layout ==
The station has two tracks. There is one island platform serving southbound trains and one side platform serving northbound trains.

== Vicinity ==
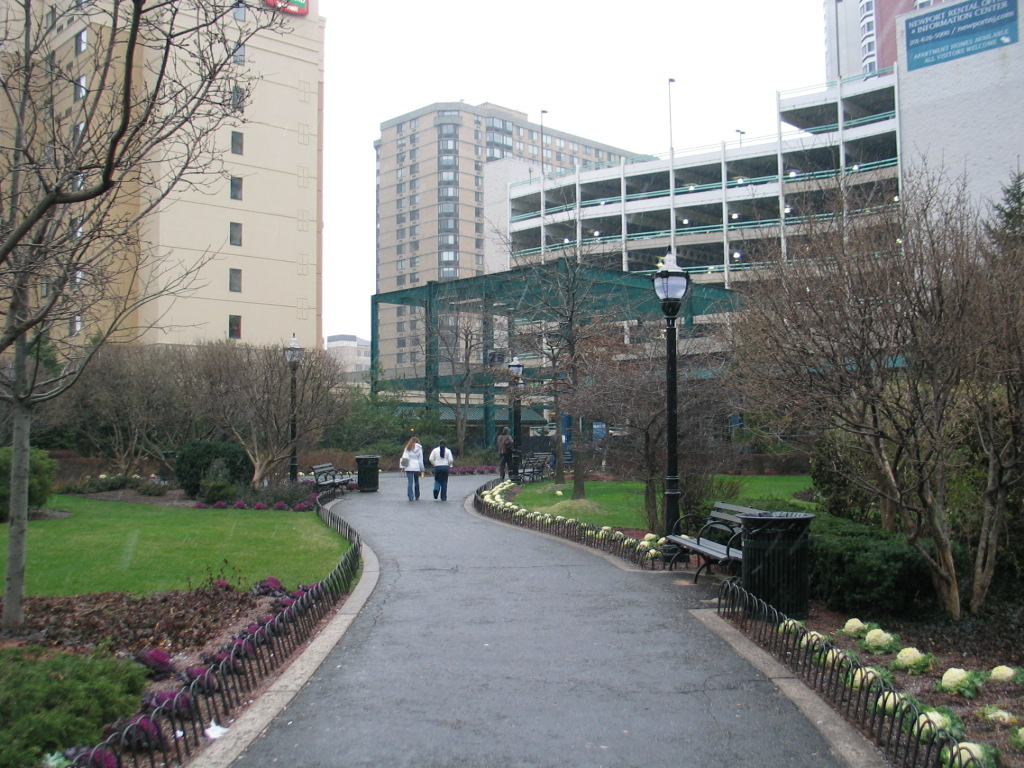
Walkway to station (in distance)

- Hudson River Waterfront Walkway
- Hudson and Manhattan Railroad Powerhouse
- Newport Centre
- Newport Tower

== See also ==
- Spanish solution
