= Hoboken–World Trade Center =

Rapid transit service in New Jersey and New York City

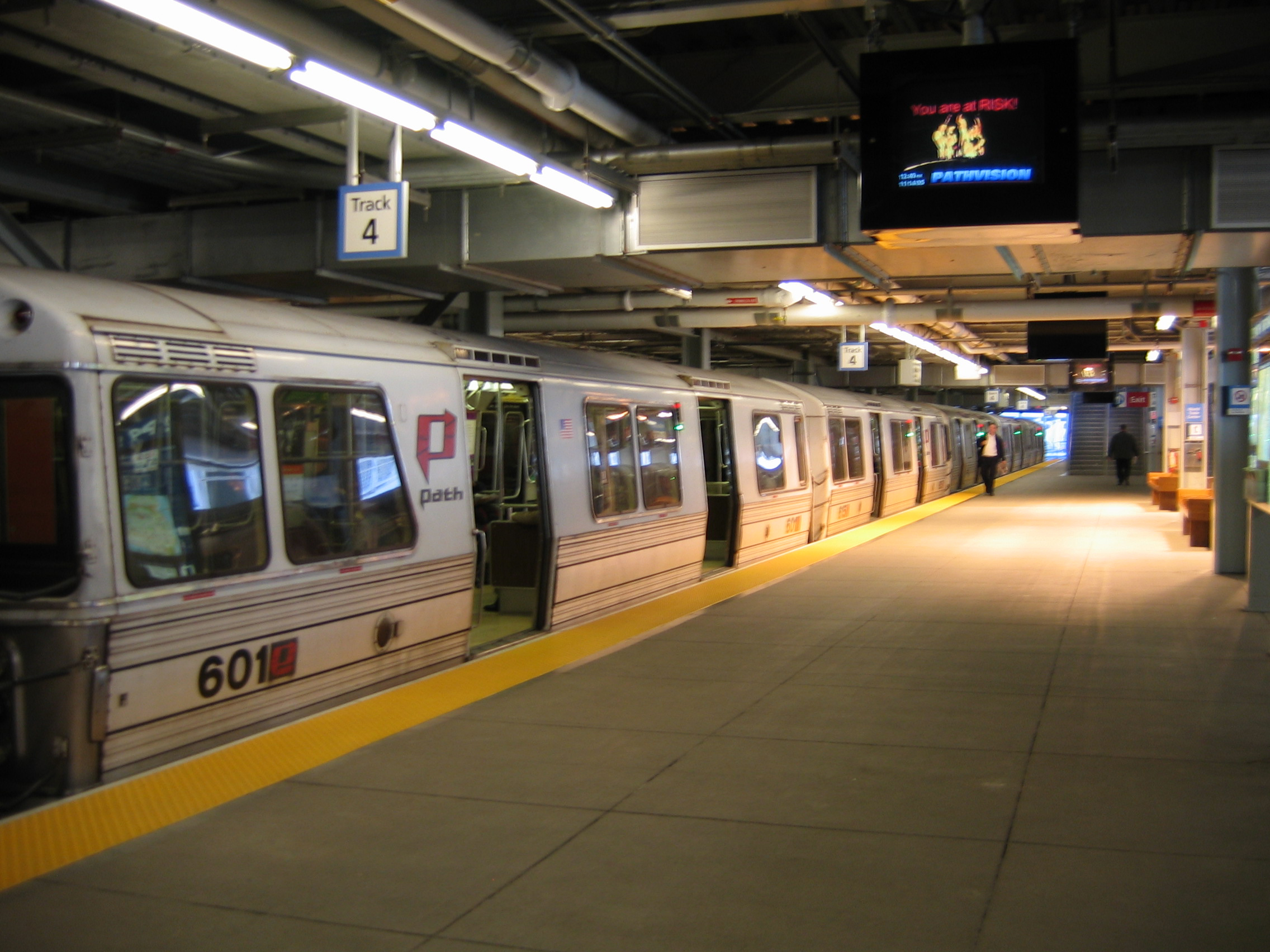
- Hoboken-bound train at the World Trade Center PATH station in 2005

Overview
- Status: Operates 6 a.m. to 11 p.m. weekdays and 10 a.m. to 9 p.m. weekends
- Owner: Port Authority of New York and New Jersey
- Locale: Hudson County, New Jersey and Manhattan, New York
- Termini: World Trade Center; Hoboken Terminal
- Stations: 4

Service
- Type: Rapid transit
- System: PATH
- Rolling stock: PA5

History
- Opened: July 19, 1909

Technical
- Line length: 3 miles (4.8 km)
- Character: Fully underground
- Track gauge: 4 ft 8 1/2 in (1,435 mm) standard gauge
- Electrification: Third rail, 600 V DC
- Operating speed: 55 mph (89 km/h)

Hoboken–World Trade Center is a rapid transit service operated by the Port Authority Trans-Hudson (PATH). It is colored green on the PATH service map and trains on this service display green marker lights. This service operates from the Hoboken Terminal in Hoboken, New Jersey, by way of the Downtown Hudson Tubes to the World Trade Center in Lower Manhattan, New York. The 3-mile (4.8 km) trip takes 11 minutes to complete, and is the shortest route in the PATH system. This is one of two routes from PATH on which every station is handicapped accessible, with the other being Newark-World Trade Center.

== History ==
The Hoboken–World Trade Center service originated as the Exchange Place–Hudson Terminal service operated by the Hudson and Manhattan Railroad (H&M). It originally operated only between Exchange Place in Jersey City and the Hudson Terminal in Manhattan beginning on July 19, 1909. It became the Hoboken–Hudson Terminal service on August 2, 1909, after the southern terminus was extended to Hoboken Terminal via Erie station (now Newport station) in Jersey City.

The H&M was succeeded by Port Authority Trans-Hudson (PATH) in 1962. The Hudson Terminal station was replaced by the World Trade Center station in 1971 during construction of the World Trade Center. Additionally, two other stations were rebuilt by PANYNJ. Exchange Place was rebuilt during the 1960s and 1970s, and the former Erie station was rebuilt as Pavonia Avenue.

Weekend Hoboken–World Trade Center service began on October 27, 1996.

Following the destruction of the World Trade Center station in the September 11 attacks, which also required the closing of Exchange Place, the Hoboken–World Trade Center branch was suspended. Instead, a temporary branch using the same color code (green) operated between Hoboken and Journal Square. When Exchange Place reopened on June 29, 2003, the green color code was used for the temporary Hoboken–Exchange Place branch. The Hoboken–World Trade Center branch was restored when the temporary World Trade Center station opened on November 23. On April 9, 2006, weekend service on this branch was discontinued to accommodate long-term construction on the World Trade Center site.

The system, particularly the Hoboken station, suffered severe damage from Hurricane Sandy in late October 2012. The Hoboken station was closed for repairs caused by damage to trainsets, mud, rusted tracks, and destroyed critical electrical equipment after approximately 8 ft (2.4 m) of water submerged the tunnels in and around the station. Damage was also reported at Exchange Place and World Trade Center stations. Due to the lengthy amount of time necessary to repair all of the damage, service on the line was temporarily suspended. On December 19, 2012, Hoboken station was reopened after its repairs were completed. However, service on the line would not resume until January 29, 2013.

In October 2024, the PANYNJ announced that the Hoboken Terminal PATH station would be closed for refurbishment for most of February 2025. During that time, the Hoboken–World Trade Center route was suspended and replaced with a temporary 33rd Street–World Trade Center route. In November 2025, the PANYNJ announced that the Hoboken–World Trade Center service would resume service on weekends between 10 a.m. and 9 p.m. every 20 minutes starting on May 17, 2026, marking the first time direct service ran between those two stations on weekends since 2001. In addition, trains would run more frequently during weekday mornings, which began on March 16, 2026.

== Station listing ==
Station	Location	Connections
Hoboken	Hoboken, NJ	PATH: HOB-33; NJ Transit Rail; Metro-North Railroad: ■ Port Jervis Line; Hudson–Bergen Light Rail; NJT Bus; NY Waterway
Newport	Jersey City, NJ	PATH: JSQ-33; Hudson–Bergen Light Rail; NJT Bus, Academy Bus
Exchange Place	Jersey City, NJ	PATH: NWK-WTC; Hudson–Bergen Light Rail; NJ Transit Bus, A&C Bus
World Trade Center	New York, NY	PATH: NWK-WTC; NYC Subway: NYCT Bus, MTA Bus
