= Hudson Tubes =

Hudson Tubes may refer to a number of tunnels between New Jersey and New York under the Hudson River:

- Uptown Hudson Tubes, PATH tunnels that terminate at 33rd Street
- Downtown Hudson Tubes, PATH tunnels that terminate at the World Trade Center
- North River Tunnels, Amtrak and NJ Transit tunnels to Penn Station
