= Journal Square Transportation Center =

Transportation center in Jersey City, New Jersey

Journal Square
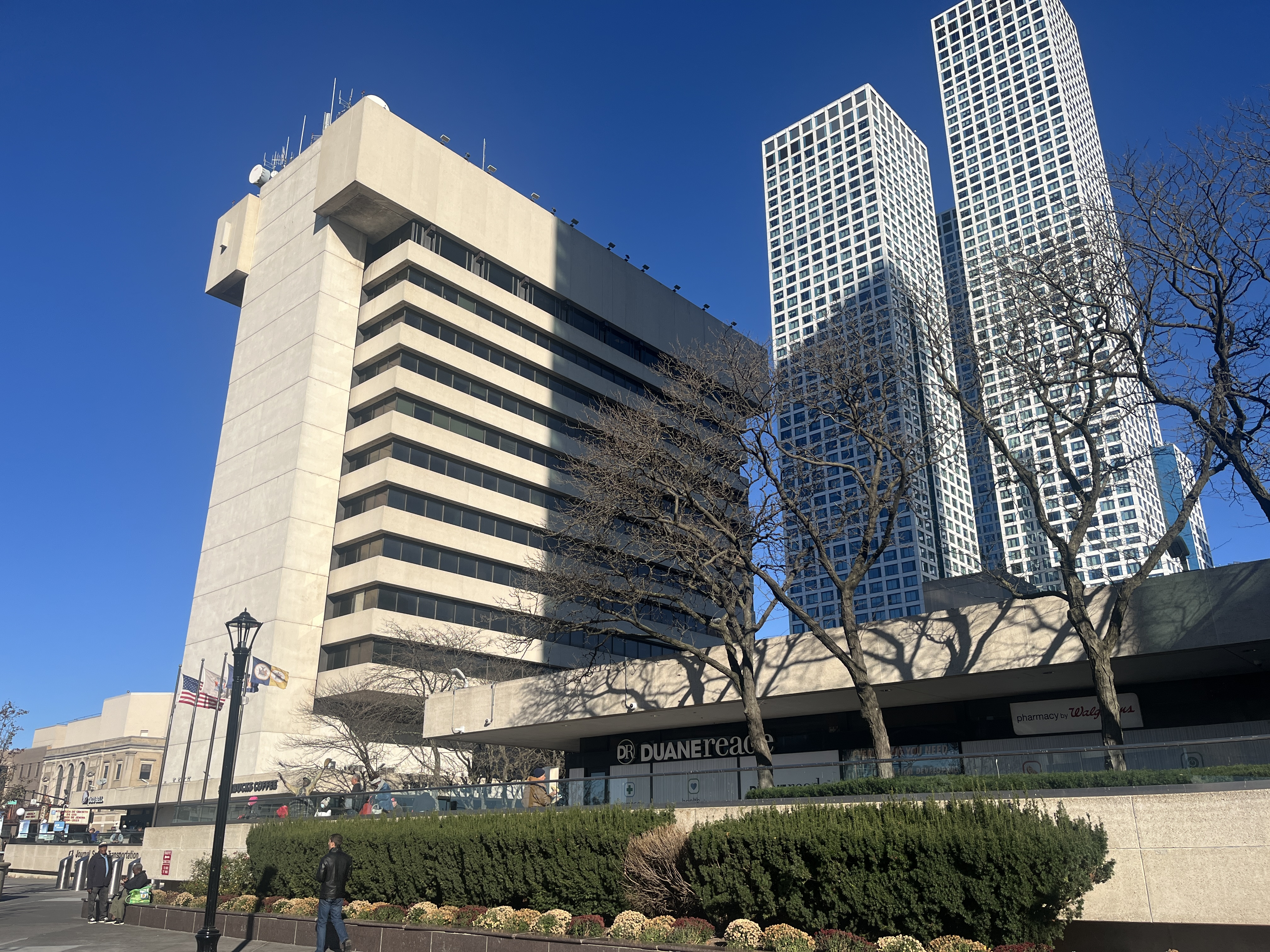
- Journal Square Transportation Center and One PATH Plaza at street level

General information
- Location: 130 Magnolia Avenue; Jersey City, New Jersey
- Coordinates: 40.732141°N 74.063114°W
- Owner: Port Authority of New York and New Jersey
- Platforms: 2 island platforms
- Tracks: 4
- Connections: NJ Transit Bus Operations: 1, 2, 6, 8, 9, 10, 14, 16, 80, 83, 84, 87, 88, 119 (late nights), 125, 319; Academy Bus; Community Bus Lines; Spanish Transportation

Construction
- Parking: 464 space parking garage
- Accessible: Yes

History
- Opened: April 14, 1912
- Rebuilt: 1926–1929, 1968–1975
- Former names: Summit Avenue (1912–1925)

Passengers
- 2025: 7,460,953 ▲7.9%
- Rank: 2 of 13

Services
| Preceding station | PATH | Following station |
|---|---|---|
| Harrison toward Newark | NWK–WTC | Grove Street toward World Trade Center |
| Terminus | JSQ–33 | Grove Street toward 33rd Street |
Late-nights
| Terminus | JSQ–33 (via HOB) | Grove Street toward 33rd Street |
Former services
| Preceding station | Hudson and Manhattan Railroad | Following station |
|---|---|---|
| Manhattan Transfer toward Park Place | Park Place–Hudson Terminal | Grove-Henderson Streets toward Hudson Terminal |
Track layout
Location

The Journal Square Transportation Center is a multi-modal transportation hub located on Magnolia Avenue and Kennedy Boulevard at Journal Square in Jersey City, New Jersey, United States. Owned and operated by the Port Authority of New York and New Jersey, the complex includes a ten-story tower, a retail plaza, a bus terminal, a two-level parking facility, and the Journal Square station of the PATH rail transit system. The underground station has a high ceiling and a mezzanine level connecting the platforms.

== History ==
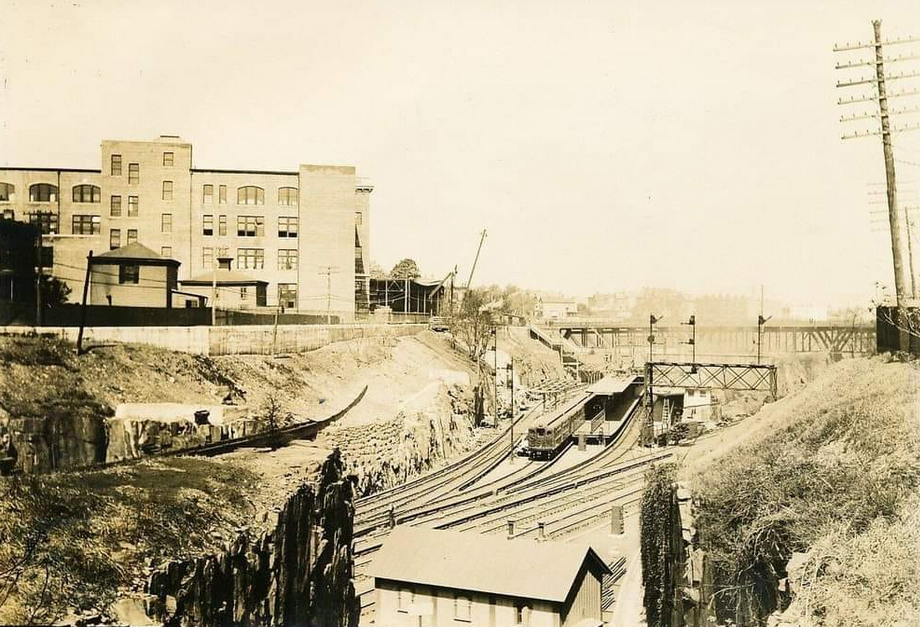
Summit Avenue in the 1910s

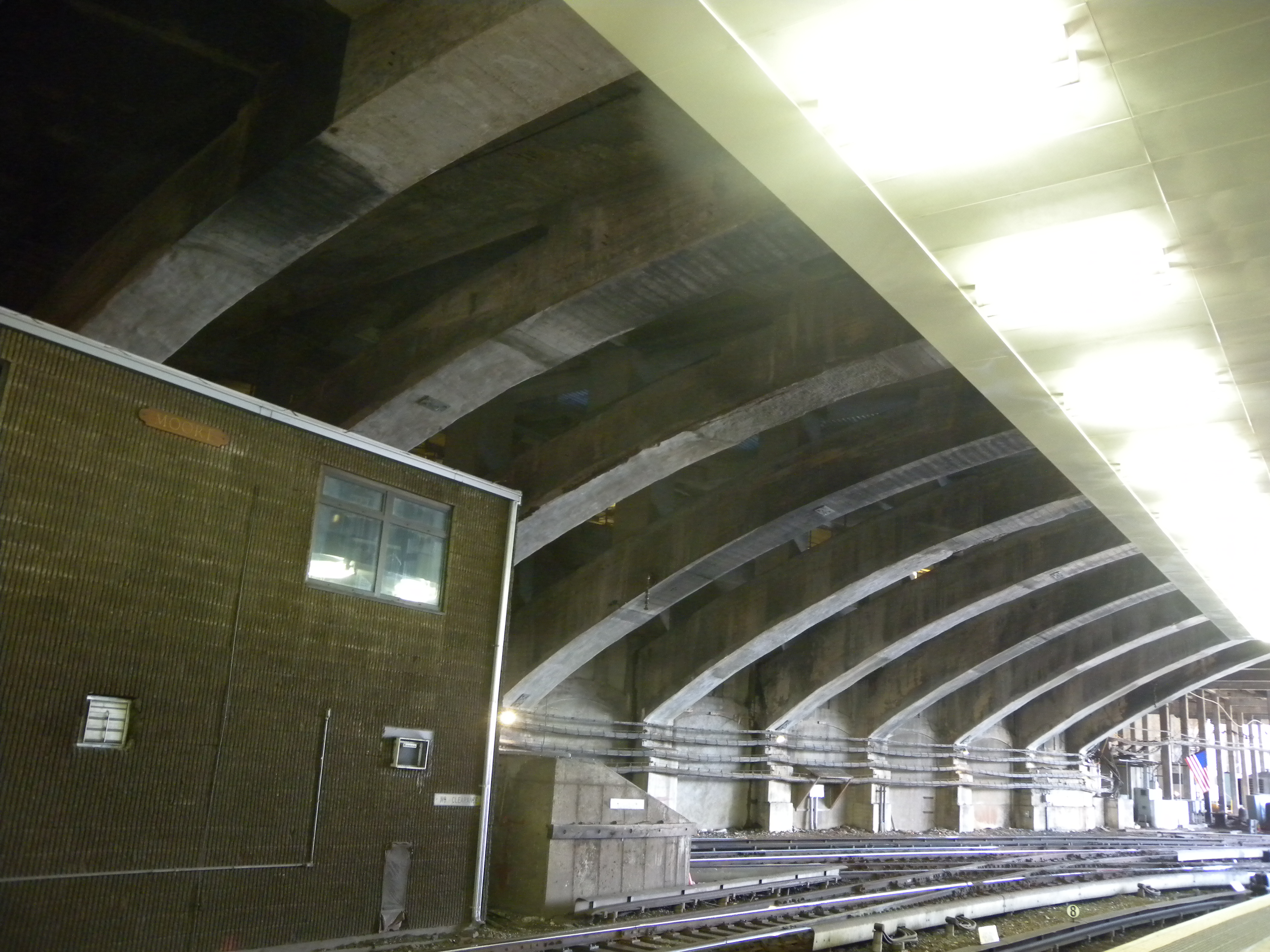
Supporting spandrels

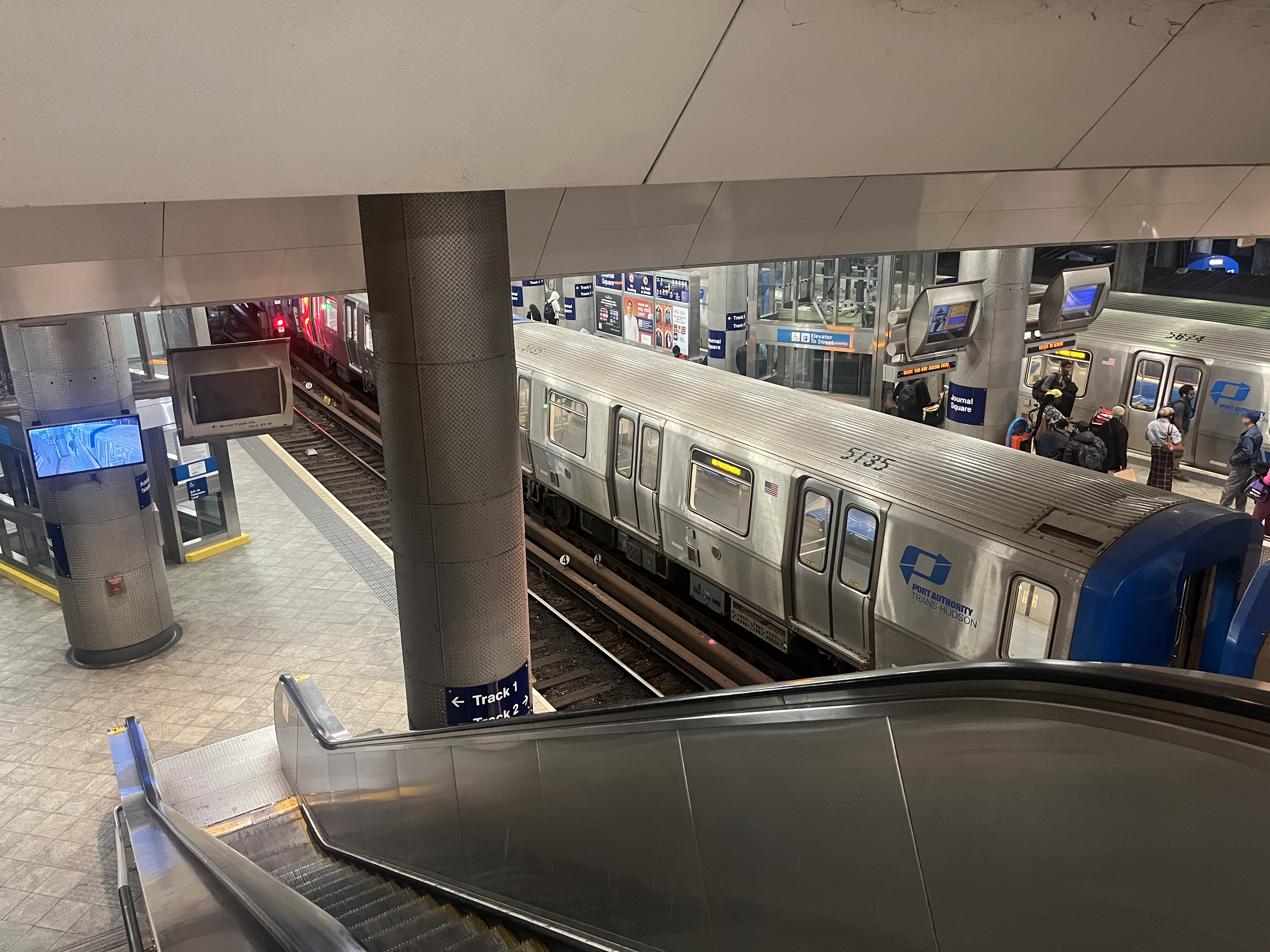
Cross-platform transfer between JSQ-Hoboken-33rd trains and NWK-WTC trains

The transportation center is built over a cut through Bergen Hill. The Bergen Hill cut was originally excavated in 1834–1838 by the New Jersey Rail Road and Transportation Company, later part of the Pennsylvania Railroad (PRR), to access the Hudson River waterfront. Passenger trains traveled to what became Exchange Place, while freight trains on the Harsimus Branch continued to the Harsimus Stem Embankment.

The center began as the Summit Avenue station of the Hudson and Manhattan Railroad (H&M), forerunner of PATH. The stop at Summit Avenue, located between Grove Street and Manhattan Transfer stations, opened on April 14, 1912, as an infill station. At the time, only one platform, an island platform in the center of the station, was in use. The Summit Avenue station was not complete until February 23, 1913, when two outer side platforms in a Spanish solution opened, and an enclosed mezzanine opened. At the time, passengers traveling on the 33rd Street line alighted and boarded on the outer side platforms, while passengers traveling on the Newark–Hudson Terminal line alighted and boarded on the center island platform. A bypass track for eastbound express trains was located to the south of the eastbound side platform.

The district was renamed Journal Square on January 1, 1925, after the newspaper, The Jersey Journal. Around that time, the Summit Avenue station was renovated and also rededicated as "Journal Square". The open-spandrel concrete arch bridge carrying Kennedy Boulevard and the station, built in 1926, is a pared-down version of a more ambitious elevated plaza scheme proposed by consulting engineer Abraham Burton Cohen. Passageways were suspended from the arches to connect the railroad station to bus stops on the bridge deck above (the bus stops were later removed). The storage yards northeast of the station were also expanded. The number of tracks in the station was increased from three to six to accommodate terminating trains from 33rd Street, as well as both local and express trains from Newark. There were two island platforms serving the station's four inner tracks, allowing cross-platform interchanges between Newark–Hudson Terminal and Journal Square–33rd Street trains, and bypass tracks for express trains that went around the four inner tracks. The Journal Square station was rededicated on June 1, 1929.

In 1962, the Port Authority bought the H&M and reorganized it as PATH. Reconstruction of the station began in 1968. Though the cornerstone was installed on September 20, 1972, the transportation center itself was opened in stages in 1973, 1974, and 1975 during the late phases of the Brutalist architecture movement. The renovated station was dedicated on October 17, 1975. A statue of Jackie Robinson was dedicated at the center in 1998.

Part of the ceiling at Journal Square fell onto the platform during the rush hour on August 8, 1983, killing two and injuring eight. The ceiling slab, a false ceiling that had been installed during the renovation ten years prior, had been observed to be sagging as early as that April.

PATH began testing out a new contactless payment system called TAPP, similar to the Metropolitan Transportation Authority's OMNY system, at Journal Square and 33rd Street in December 2023.

== Station layout ==
=== Rapid transit service ===
The PATH station is the southern terminus of two PATH lines: Journal Square–33rd Street during the daytime and Journal Square–33rd Street (via Hoboken) on weekend mornings, late nights, and holidays. It is also a stop on the Newark-World Trade Center line. The station also serves as PATH's administrative headquarters.

At the platform level, the inside express tracks are typically used by trains on the Journal Square–33rd Street and Journal Square–33rd Street (via Hoboken) lines, while the outside local tracks are used by trains on the Newark–World Trade Center line.

=== Bus ===
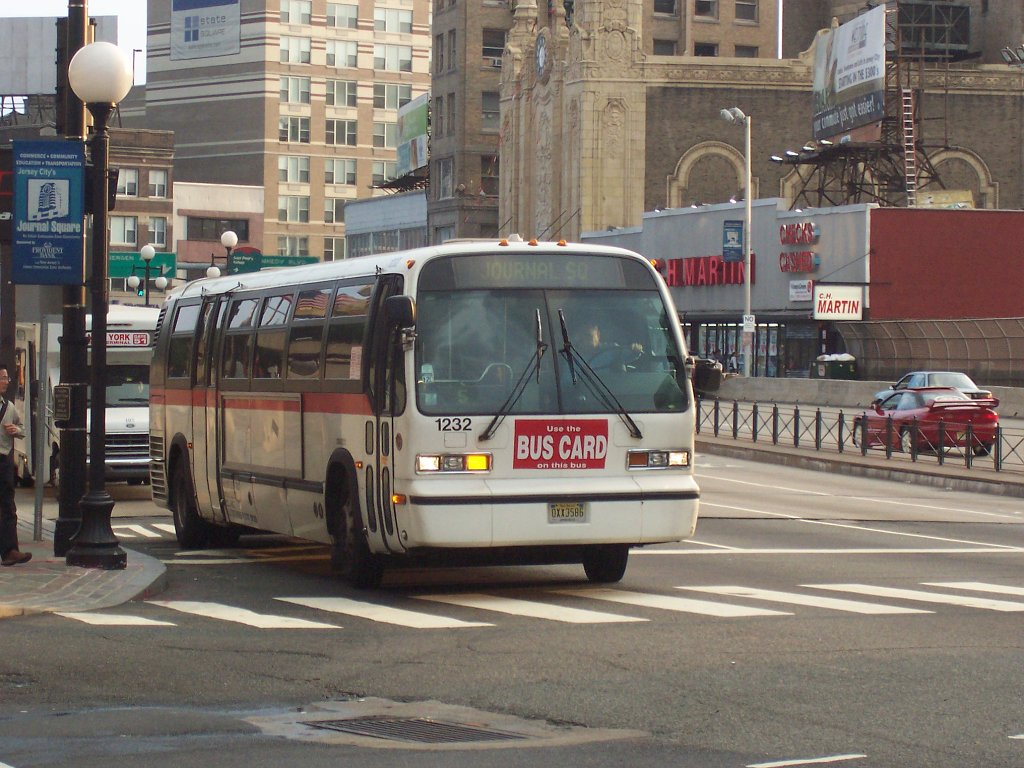
Bus at Journal Square before turning into Pavonia Avenue and entrance to bus platforms, followed by a guagua (minibus), which also serves the region

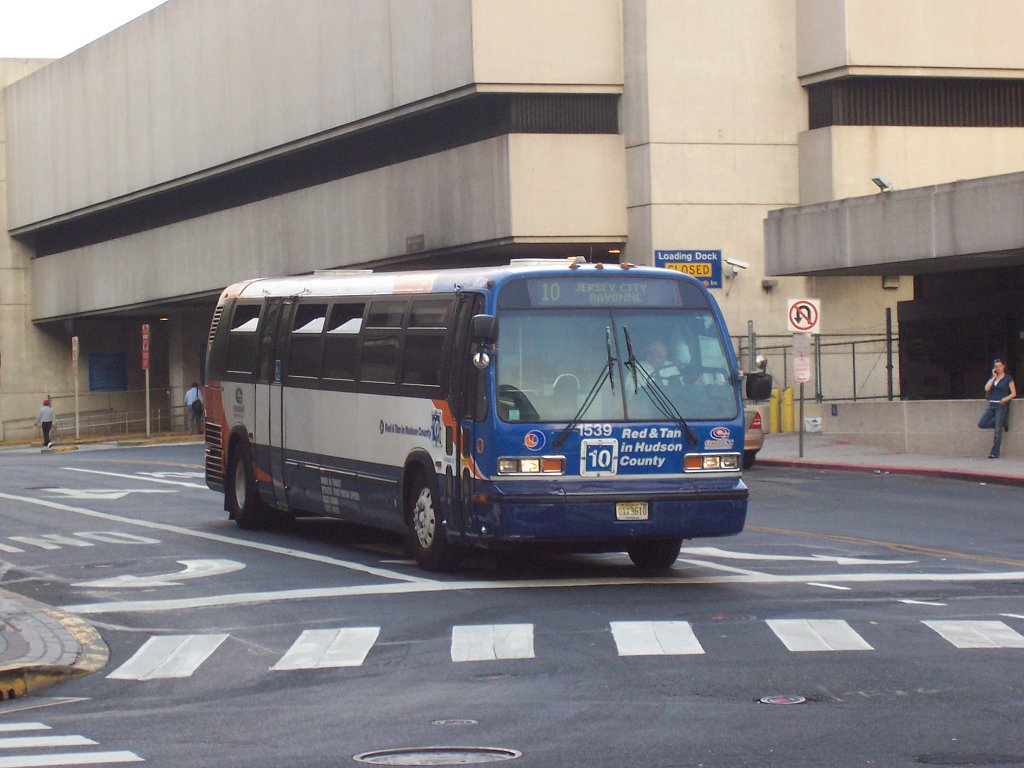
Bus exiting Pavonia Avenue

Journal Square is one of three major terminals for New Jersey Transit buses to and from Jersey City, the others being Exchange Place and Hoboken Terminal. Buses operated by NJ Transit and private enterprises run to and from points throughout Hudson County and to the Port Authority Bus Terminal in Midtown Manhattan. There is also service to Newark, Hackensack, the Jersey Shore, and Atlantic City. Bus arrivals and departures use platforms accessible from within the station or via Pavonia or Sip Avenues.

| Route | destination | major points |
|---|---|---|
| 1 NJT | Newark-Ivy Hill via Newark-Ironbound and Downtown Newark | West Side; Lincoln Highway; Ferry Street/Raymond Boulevard; Market Street; 16th Avenue |
| 2 NJT | Secaucus Junction | Kennedy Boulevard; County Avenue; Meadowlands Parkway |
| 6 NJT | Greenville; Merritt Street | Summit Avenue; Communipaw Junction; Ocean Avenue |
| 8 | Greenville | Bergen Square; McGinley Square; Bergen Avenue; Old Bergen Road |
| 10 | Bayonne; JFK Blvd and 3rd Street | Kennedy Boulevard |
| 14 | Hudson Mall | Marion Section; West Side Avenue; Route 440 |
| 16 | Newport Mall | Liberty State Park, Bergen-Lafayette, and Grove Street |
| 80 eastbound NJT | Exchange Place | Newark Avenue |
| 80 southbound NJT | Greenville regular service | West Side Avenue |
| 83 NJT | Hackensack Bus Terminal | Summit Avenue; Bergen Turnpike; Tonnelle Avenue; U.S. Route 46; Main Street |
| 84; NJT | Nungesser's; North Bergen | Newark Avenue; Palisade Avenue; Bergenline |
| 87 southbound NJT | Greenville; Gates Avenue | Bergen Square; MLK Drive; Old Bergen Road |
| 87 northbound NJT | Hudson Place; Hoboken Terminal | Central Avenue; Palisade Avenue; 9th Street-Congress Street HBLR; Paterson Plank Road |
| 88; NJT | Nungesser's; North Bergen | Kennedy Boulevard |
| 119J late night service only | Port Authority Bus Terminal; 42nd Street (Manhattan) | Kennedy Boulevard; 9th Street-Congress Street HBLR; 14th Street Viaduct |
| 125; NJT | Port Authority Bus Terminal; 42nd Street (Manhattan) | Kennedy Boulevard; Marginal Highway |
| 319; NJT | Atlantic City Bus Terminal or Wildwood Bus Terminal; Seasonal: Cape May | Garden State Parkway; Express to Sea Isle City (stops in Toms River) |
| Bergenline Avenue Jitney | Newport Mall; George Washington Bridge Plaza | Newark Avenue; Palisade Avenue; Bergenline; Fort Lee |
| JFK Boulevard Jitney; Community Lines | Port Authority Bus Terminal; 42nd Street (Manhattan) | Kennedy Boulevard; Union City |

== Nearby destinations ==
The Loew's Jersey Theatre, the Stanley Theater, Hudson County Community College, Journal Squared, One Journal Square, 26 Journal Square, Hudson County Courthouse, and Hudson County Administration Building are in the immediate vicinity. Nearby are the neighborhoods Bergen Square, India Square, Marion Section, Five Corners, the Hilltop, and McGinley Square, site of Beacon and Saint Peter's College.
