= Newark–World Trade Center =

Rapid transit service in New Jersey and New York City

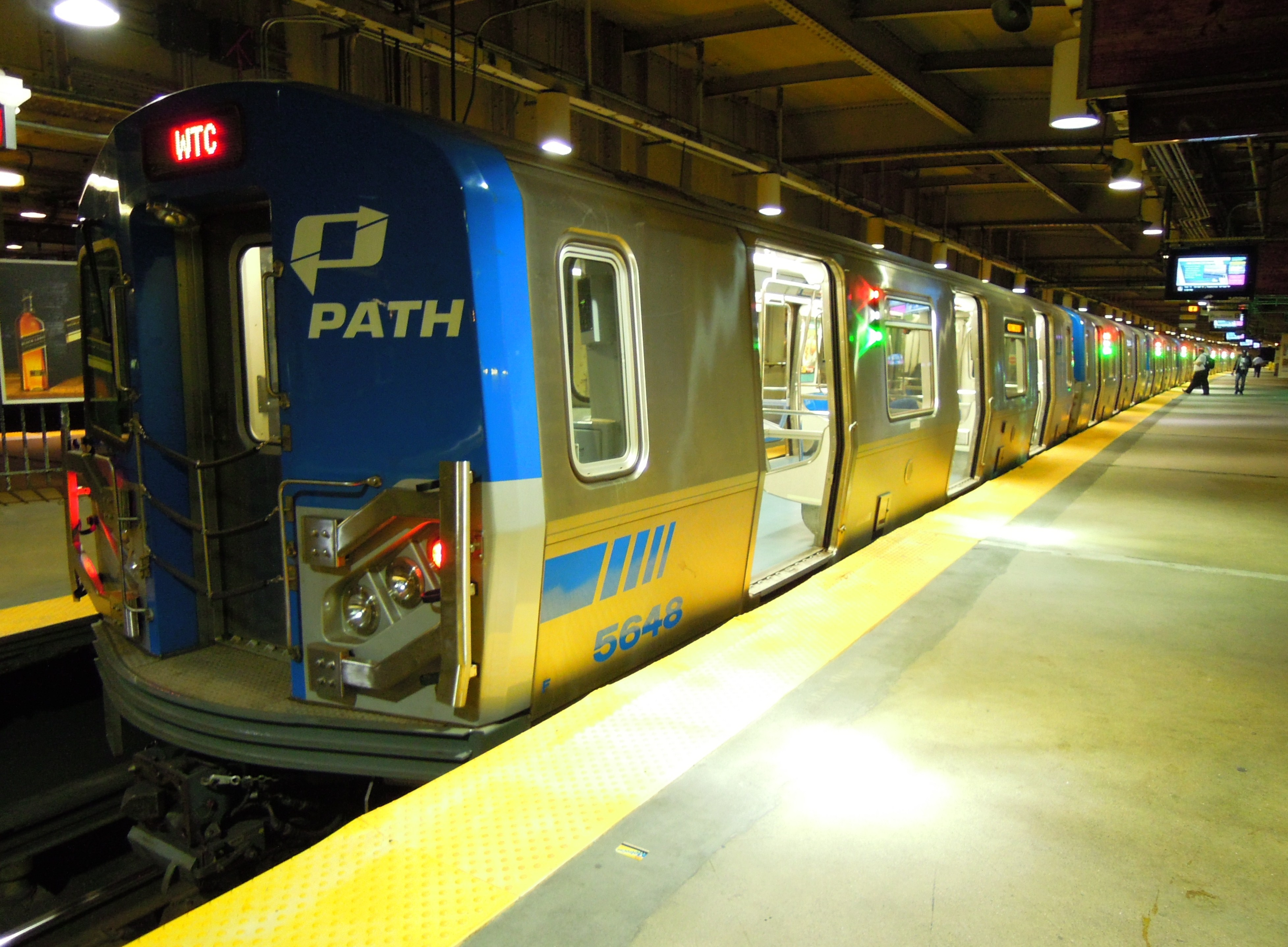
- Train boarding passengers at Newark Penn Station

Overview
- Status: Operates 24 hours
- Owner: Port Authority of New York and New Jersey
- Locale: Newark/Hudson County, New Jersey and Manhattan, New York
- Termini: Newark Penn Station; World Trade Center
- Stations: 6

Service
- Type: Rapid transit
- System: PATH
- Rolling stock: PA5
- Daily ridership: 30,000 (2022)

History
- Opened: September 6, 1910

Technical
- Line length: 8.9 miles (14.3 km)
- Character: Elevated, surface and underground
- Track gauge: 4 ft 8 1/2 in (1,435 mm) standard gauge
- Electrification: Third rail, 600 V DC
- Operating speed: 55 mph (89 km/h)

Newark–World Trade Center is a rapid transit service operated by the Port Authority Trans-Hudson (PATH). It is colored red on the PATH service map and trains on this service display red marker lights. This service operates from Pennsylvania Station in Newark, New Jersey, by way of the Downtown Hudson Tubes to the World Trade Center in Lower Manhattan, New York City, New York. Operating 24 hours a day, the 8.9-mile (14.3 km) trip takes 22 1/2 minutes to complete.

Much of the service's Newark-Jersey City leg is in very close proximity to the Northeast Corridor used by Amtrak intercity trains and NJ Transit commuter trains; the route crosses over the Newark Dock Bridge used by intercity and commuter trains traveling between Newark and New York. For these reasons, PATH is legally reckoned as a commuter railroad under the jurisdiction of the Federal Railroad Administration even though it has long operated as a rapid transit system. This is the only PATH route with significant above-ground sections; the Newark–Jersey City leg operates on elevated track, in open cuts, or at grade level.

== History ==
=== H&M operation ===
The Newark–World Trade Center service originated as the Grove Street–Hudson Terminal service operated by the Hudson and Manhattan Railroad (H&M). It started operating between Grove Street in Jersey City, New Jersey and Hudson Terminal in Manhattan, beginning September 6, 1910. The line was extended to Manhattan Transfer in Harrison on October 1, 1911, and then to Park Place in Newark on November 26 of that year. A stop at Summit Avenue (now Journal Square), located between Grove Street and Manhattan Transfer, opened on April 14, 1912, as an infill station on the Newark–Hudson Terminal line. Another infill station at Harrison opened on March 6, 1913.

In June 1937, the branch to Park Place Station was closed, and the Newark–Hudson Terminal line was rerouted to Newark Penn Station. The Manhattan Transfer station was also closed, and the Harrison station was relocated.

=== PATH operation ===
The H&M was succeeded by Port Authority Trans-Hudson (PATH) in 1962. The Hudson Terminal station was replaced by the World Trade Center station in 1971 during construction of the World Trade Center.

On April 29, 1996, three trips each weekday began running express on the Newark–World Trade Center service, cutting running time by 3 1/2 minutes. The express service skipped all intermediate stops and ran only in the morning toward World Trade Center. On October 27, 1996, express Newark–World Trade Center service was made permanent.

When the World Trade Center station was destroyed in the September 11 attacks, which also required the closing of Exchange Place, service on the Newark–World Trade Center line had to be changed. On weekdays, trains ran between any pair of Newark Penn Station, 33rd Street, and Hoboken Terminal, making all local stops. On weekends, trains ran between Newark Penn Station and 33rd Street with Hoboken Terminal as an interim stop. Express service was suspended indefinitely. During overnight hours daily, trains ran between Newark and 33rd Street via Hoboken and was the only branch operating on PATH during those times. When Exchange Place reopened on June 29, 2003, service ran between Newark and that station daily around the clock. Service to World Trade Center was restored on November 23 when the temporary station opened. However, the express service was never restored.

After Hurricane Sandy flooded the PATH system in October 2012, service on the line was suspended. For most of November, trains ran between Newark Penn Station and 33rd Street. The Journal Square–33rd Street line was temporarily extended to cover service on the Newark–World Trade Center line. Limited weekday-only service on the line was resumed on November 26, 2012, but full service would not be restored until early 2013. Starting on January 5, 2019, service on the Newark–World Trade Center line between Exchange Place and World Trade Center was to be suspended during almost all weekends through at least 2020 for Sandy-related repairs to the Downtown Hudson Tubes except on holiday weekends. Passengers wanting to travel to New York City from Newark during this time must transfer to the Journal Square–33rd Street (via Hoboken) service at either Journal Square or Grove Street. However, weekend service was restored in June 2020, six months ahead of schedule.

In June 2019, the Port Authority released the PATH Improvement Plan. As part of the plan, every train on the NWK–WTC route will consist of 9-car trains, and the Port Authority would study proposals to extend NWK–WTC trainsets to 10 cars. To accomplish this, the platform at Grove Street will be extended at the Marin Blvd. end of the station. The train lengthenings, combined with the installation of communications-based train control and the delivery of additional rolling stock, could increase NWK–WTC capacity by up to 40%. The route began running with 9-car trains in March 2023. In November 2025, as part of its 2026–2035 capital plan, the PANYNJ announced that the Newark–World Trade Center route would run twice as frequently at night starting in May 2026, with headways reduced from 40 to 20 minutes. The route would also run more frequently during weekend daytime hours. In addition, weekday trains would run more frequently, with headways of four minutes starting in March 2027, and weekend service would run more frequently beginning in May 2027.

=== Newark Airport extension ===
On February 4, 2014, the Port Authority proposed a 10-year capital plan that included an extension of PATH three miles (4.8 km) southwest from Newark Penn Station to Newark Liberty International Airport, after a nearly two-year study. The Board of Commissioners approved the Capital Plan, including the airport extension, on February 19, 2014. Plans call for the extension to follow the existing Northeast Corridor Line used by Amtrak and NJ Transit to the Newark Liberty International Airport station, where passengers can connect to the AirTrain Newark airport monorail system. In March, 2023 the plan for the extension was “being deferred to a future capital plan” due to funding issues.

== Station listing ==
Station	Location	Connections
Newark	Newark, NJ	Amtrak; NJ Transit Rail; Newark Light Rail; NJ Transit Bus
Harrison	Harrison, NJ	NJT Bus
Journal Square	Jersey City, NJ	PATH: JSQ-33 JSQ-33 (via HOB); NJ Transit Bus
Grove Street	Jersey City, NJ	PATH: JSQ-33 JSQ-33 (via HOB); NJ Transit Bus
Exchange Place	Jersey City, NJ	PATH: HOB-WTC; Hudson–Bergen Light Rail; NJ Transit Bus
World Trade Center	New York, NY	PATH: HOB-WTC; NYC Subway: NYCT Bus, MTA Bus
