= Exchange Place station (PATH) =

Port Authority Trans-Hudson rail station

Exchange Place
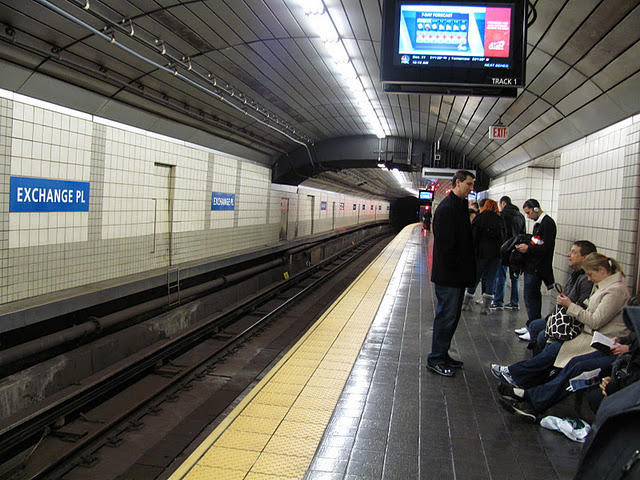
- View of the station platform

General information
- Location: Exchange Place; Jersey City, New Jersey
- Coordinates: 40.7162°N 74.032981°W
- Owner: Port Authority of New York and New Jersey
- Line: Downtown Hudson Tubes
- Platforms: 2 inter-connected side platforms cross-platform interchange
- Tracks: 2
- Connections: HBLR at Exchange Place; NJ Transit Bus: 1, 63, 64, 68, 80, 81, 82

Construction
- Parking: 480 space parking garage
- Accessible: Yes

History
- Opened: July 19, 1909
- Rebuilt: 1989

Passengers
- 2025: 3,922,311
- Rank: 7 of 13

Services
Preceding station	PATH	Following station
Grove Street toward Newark	NWK–WTC	World Trade Center Terminus
Newport toward Hoboken	HOB–WTC	World Trade Center Terminus
Former services
Preceding station	Hudson and Manhattan Railroad	Following station
Grove-Henderson Streets toward Park Place	Park Place–Hudson Terminal	Hudson Terminal Terminus
Track layout
Location

Exchange Place station is a station on the Port Authority Trans–Hudson (PATH) rail system in the Paulus Hook neighborhood of Jersey City, Hudson County, New Jersey. The station is on the Newark–World Trade Center line at all times, and the Hoboken–World Trade Center line at all times except nights. Exchange Place provides access to the Jersey City waterfront and a station on the Hudson–Bergen Light Rail, where connections are available to Bayonne and North Bergen.

Exchange Place station opened on July 19, 1909, as part of the original opening of the Hudson and Manhattan Railroad between the former Pennsylvania Railroad terminal at Exchange Place and Hudson Terminal. The station headhouse was rebuilt in 1989. Exchange Place station flooded after the September 11 attacks and was closed until June 29, 2003, when it became a temporary terminal. Service returned to World Trade Center on November 23, 2003.

== History ==
=== Original station ===
The original Exchange Place station opened on July 19, 1909 at the western end of the Downtown Hudson Tubes adjacent to the Pennsylvania Railroad station and ferry terminal. The above-ground entrance and platforms were refurbished in the late 1960s and early 1970s after the Port Authority of New York and New Jersey took over operations of the Hudson and Manhattan Railroad.

A derailment on April 26, 1942 at this station resulted in five deaths and over 200 injuries. In that incident, the train operator Louis Vierbucken was charged with manslaughter, as he was under the influence of liquor. Court records recount that he "began to go faster and faster, disregarding warning signals and curves" and then the train derailed at the station.

=== Present day ===
The platforms were lengthened in 1987 to allow the station to accommodate eight-car trains. The present-day station entrance pavilion at Exchange Place was constructed at a cost of $66 million, and was dedicated on September 13, 1989. At this time, the surrounding Paulus Hook area was beginning to undergo revitalization with new office building construction. In April 1994, a new entrance to the Exchange Place station was opened, making the station ADA accessible. The new entrance was glass-enclosed and featured two elevators which led to a lower-level passageway 63 feet (19 m) down, from where another elevator went down the short distance to platform level.

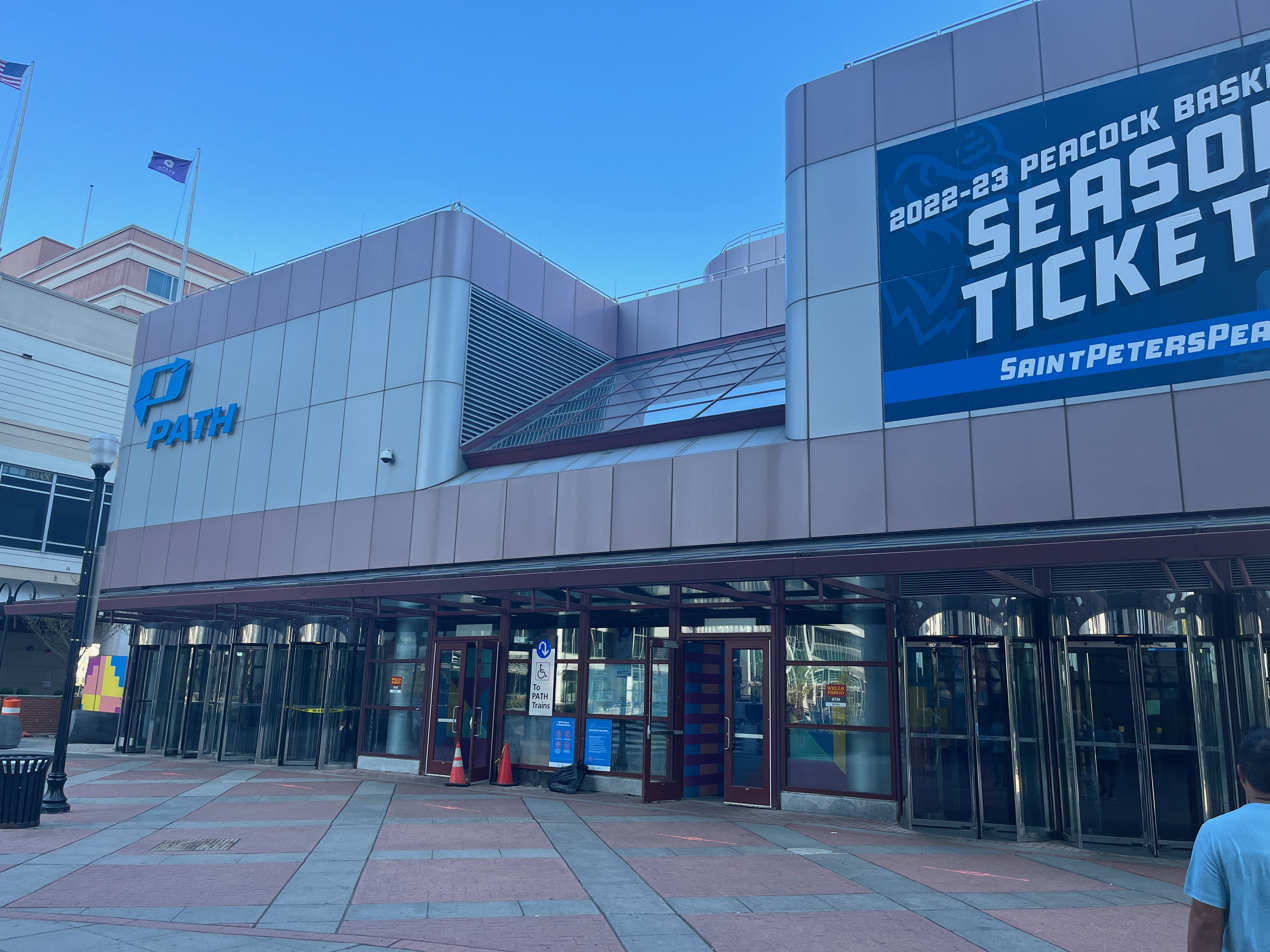
Exchange Place station exterior

The Exchange Place station was closed as a result of the September 11, 2001 attacks, due to water from firefighting flooding the tunnels. Before the attacks, the station served 16,000 passengers daily. The World Trade Center station was also crucial, as that station contained a loop that enabled trains to turn around and reverse direction. New trackwork was installed at a cost of $160 million, which included an interlocking to allow the trains to switch tracks, thus enabling trains to terminate at Exchange Place. While the station was closed, the eight-car-long station platforms were lengthened by two car lengths so they could accommodate 10-car trains. On June 29, 2003, the Exchange Place PATH station reopened, restoring services to Newark and Hoboken. On November 23, 2003, service was restored to the World Trade Center site with the reopening of the World Trade Center station.

In February 2006, the Transportation Security Administration (TSA) established a pilot project to test airport-style security screening at the Exchange Place station.

In 2012, the station was inundated by 13 million US gallons (49,000 m^{3}) of saltwater from the Hudson River, which had overflowed as a result of Hurricane Sandy. The PANYNJ later announced a resiliency project in which it planned to replace the glass revolving doors and windows that surround the turnstiles with a seven-foot-high concrete wall and aquarium glass several inches thick. The project would include in the installation of two Kevlar curtains.

In June 2019, the Port Authority released the PATH Improvement Plan. As part of the plan, two additional cross-corridors were to be added at Exchange Place. The construction of the cross-corridors was expected to be completed by 2022.

From January 2019 until June 2020, the Newark-World Trade Center route terminated at Exchange Place on almost all weekends for Sandy-related repairs, except on holiday weekends. The truncation was initially expected to last through all of 2020, but ended in June 2020, six months ahead of schedule.

== Station layout ==
The station entrance is located approximately 100 feet (30 m) west of the former, original station entrance. The station features three 150-foot (46 m)-long escalators that go down long and provide access to the platform level, located 75 feet (23 m) beneath street level. Connections are available to the Hudson-Bergen Light Rail at street level.

West of the station (railroad north), there are five trackways: two outer tracks for Hoboken, two inner tracks for Newark, and one stub-end track connecting each of the Newark tracks. East of the station (railroad south), both lines continue into their weekday terminus.

The station has two vestibules, each containing one side platform and one track for trains in a given direction. The platforms are connected through several corridors. There are switches within the platform at the far western end of the station, where the HOB-WTC line's tracks diverge. As a result, only NWK-WTC trains can serve the whole platform.

== Nearby attractions ==
Nearby attractions include the Colgate Clock, Goldman Sachs Tower, Harborside Financial Center, Paulus Hook, and the Hudson and Manhattan Railroad Powerhouse.
