= Park Place station (Hudson and Manhattan Railroad) =

Former Hudson and Manhattan Railroad station

Park Place
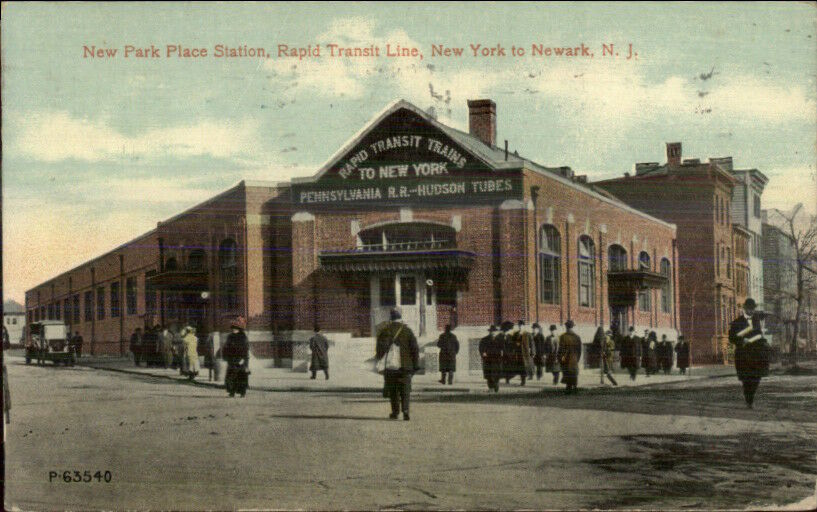
- Park Place station on a 1914 postcard

General information
- Location: Park Place and Centre Street; Newark, New Jersey
- Coordinates: 40.739746°N 74.16769°W
- Line: Park Place – Hudson Terminal
- Connections: Newark Public Service Terminal

History
- Opened: 1911
- Closed: 1937 (demolished)

Former services
Preceding station	Hudson and Manhattan Railroad	Following station
Terminus	Park Place–Hudson Terminal	Harrison toward Hudson Terminal
Location

The Park Place station was a terminal of the Hudson and Manhattan Railroad (H&M) located at the intersection of Park Place and Centre Street in Newark, New Jersey, across the street from Military Park nearby Newark Public Service Terminal. The terminal opened on November 26, 1911, after the H&M extended its line westward from Grove Street in Jersey City to Summit Avenue, Manhattan Transfer, and over the Centre Street Bridge to Newark. The terminal closed on June 20, 1937, after the H&M tracks were realigned to serve the new Newark Penn Station.

The H&M was taken over by the Port Authority of New York and New Jersey in 1962, the system becoming the Port Authority Trans-Hudson (PATH). The New Jersey Performing Arts Center is sited on the location of the terminal adjacent to the Newark Light Rail's NJPAC/Center Street station.

== See also ==
- New Jersey Railroad
- Four Corners (Newark)
- Newark and New York Branch
