= Hudson and Manhattan Railroad Powerhouse =

- U.S. National Register of Historic Places
- New Jersey Register of Historic Places
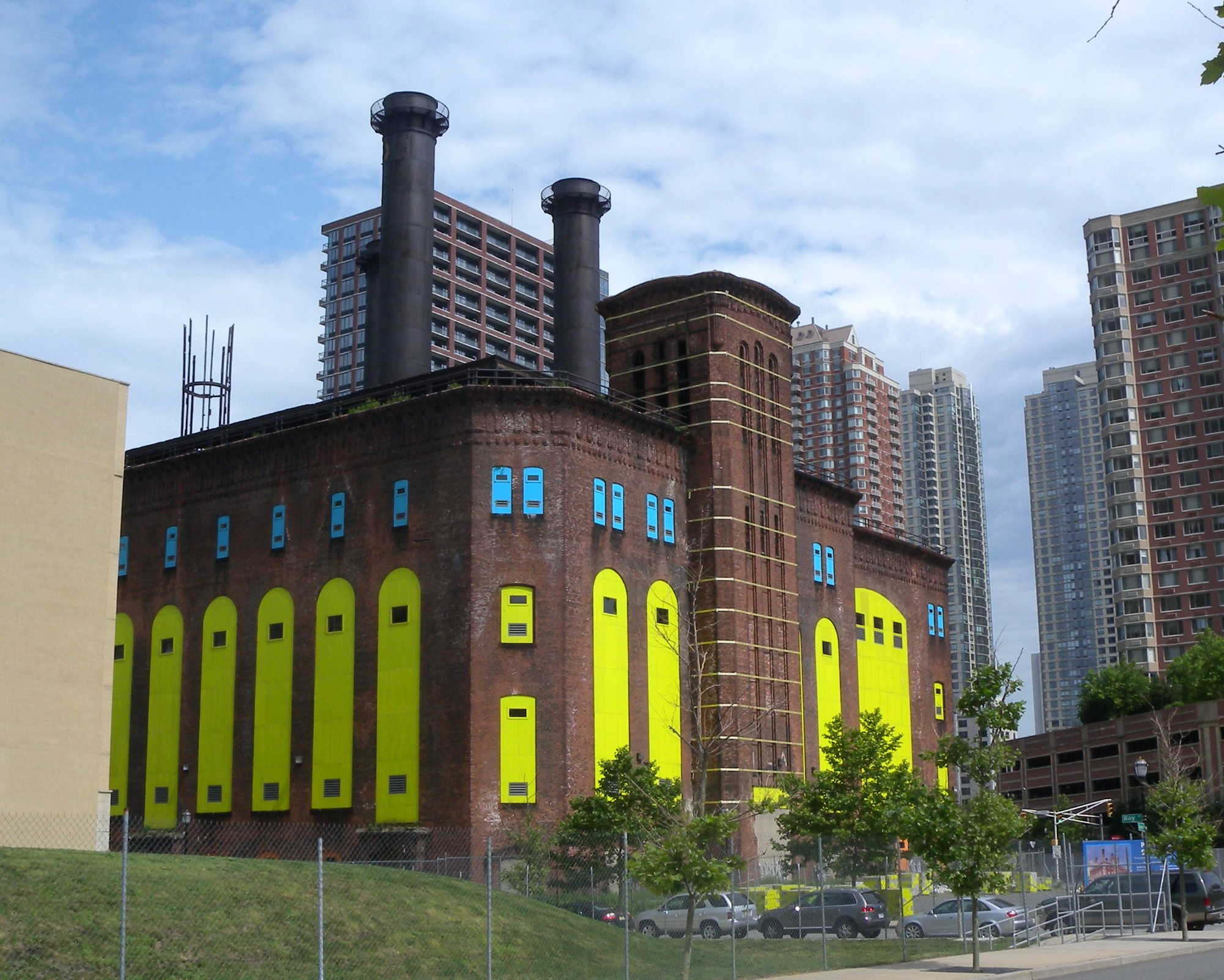

- Location within Hudson County, New Jersey Location within New Jersey Location within the United States
- Location: 60-84 Bay Street, Jersey City, New Jersey
- Coordinates: 40°43′14″N 74°2′10″W
- Area: 1.8 acres (0.73 ha)
- Built: 1908
- Architect: John Oakman
- Architectural style: Late 19th And 20th Century Revivals
- NRHP reference No.: 01001256
- NJRHP No.: 1570
- Added to NRHP: November 23, 2001

The Hudson and Manhattan Railroad Powerhouse (also known as the Jersey City Powerhouse) is located in Jersey City, New Jersey, United States. Built in 1908, the powerhouse made possible the subway system between New Jersey and New York for the Hudson and Manhattan Railroad (which became PATH in 1962). It was built under the leadership of William Gibbs McAdoo, president of the railroad. The powerhouse was closed in 1929 and used as a storage place for railroad equipment. In the 1990s, the building was cited by Preservation New Jersey as one of the state's ten most endangered historic sites. The powerhouse was added to the National Register of Historic Places on November 23, 2001, for its significance in architecture, engineering, and transportation.

It is located near the Harborside Financial Center and Harsimus Cove on the Hudson River waterfront in an area undergoing much redevelopment. By the 21st century, the powerhouse was outdated, and the site was prone to flooding. Efforts to stabilize the powerhouse from further deterioration began in July 2009 and continued through 2010. In 2011, the Port Authority of New York and New Jersey agreed to transfer its 55% ownership of the building to its co-owner, Jersey City, in exchange for a nearby lot where they would build an underground electric sub-station. It was determined that the iconic smokestacks could not be saved, leading to their removal.

The Jersey City government finalized its agreement to acquire the building in 2018 after settling a four-year legal dispute. Work on a new substation, replacing the old H&M Powerhouse's functions, began in 2023. In 2026, a neighboring section of Greene Street was closed after cracks were detected in the walls. Although the street was later reopened, temporary straps holding the building together were found to have cracked. That October, the Jersey City Redevelopment Agency issued a request for proposals for the powerhouse.

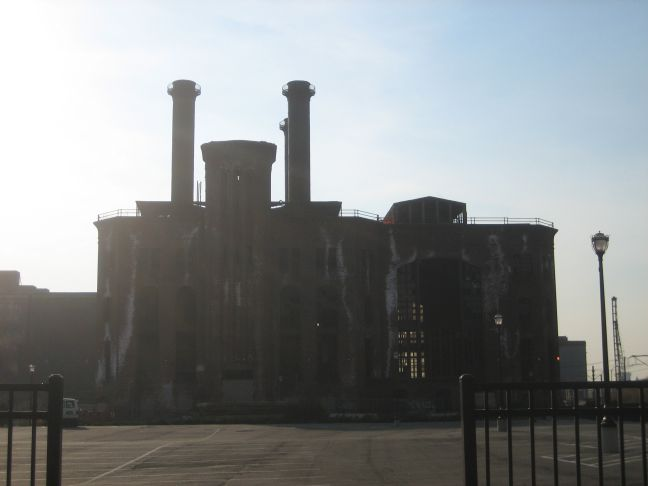
The Powerhouse pictured in 2006 before structural stabilization began

== See also ==
- Powerhouse Arts District, Jersey City
- National Register of Historic Places listings in Hudson County, New Jersey
- Harsimus Cove Station
