= Christopher Street–Stonewall station =

New York City Subway station in Manhattan

Christopher Street–Stonewall
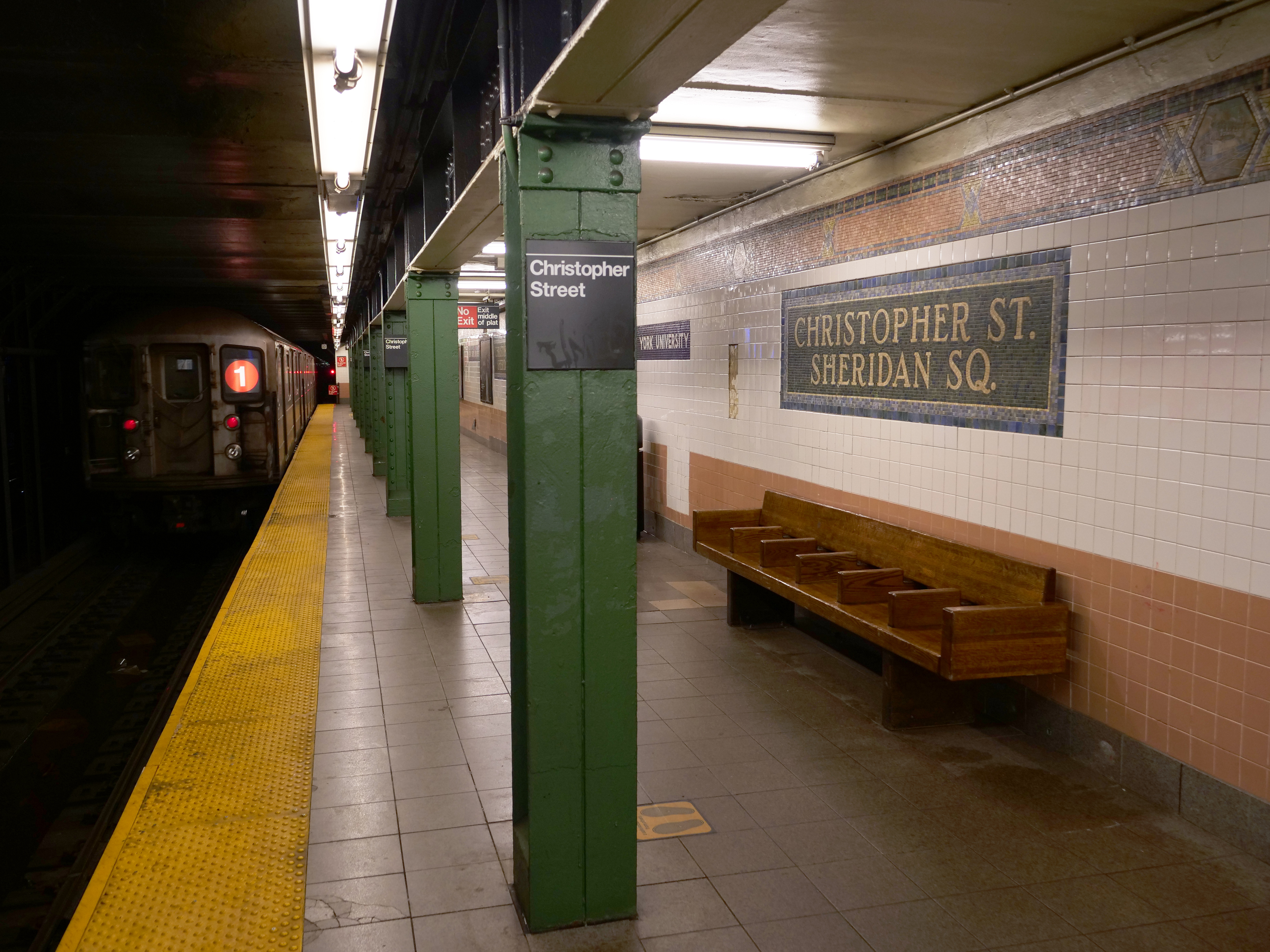
- Northbound 1 train departs prior to the station renaming.

Station statistics
- Address: Christopher Street & Seventh Avenue South; New York, New York
- Borough: Manhattan
- Locale: Greenwich Village
- Coordinates: 40.733°N 74.003°W
- Division: A (IRT)
- Line: IRT Broadway–Seventh Avenue Line
- Services: 1 (all times); 2 (late nights)
- Transit: NYCT Bus: M8, M20; PATH: JSQ–33, HOB–33, JSQ–33 (via HOB) (at Ninth Street or Christopher Street)
- Structure: Underground
- Platforms: 2 side platforms
- Tracks: 4

Other information
- Opened: July 1, 1918; 108 years ago
- Former/other names: Christopher Street–Sheridan Square

Traffic
- 2025: 3,300,633 ▲10.5%
- Rank: 114 out of 423
Services
Preceding station	New York City Subway	Following station
14th Street 1 2 toward Van Cortlandt Park–242nd Street	Local	Houston Street 1 2 toward South Ferry
does not stop here
Location
Location within New York City Subway
Location within New York City
Location within New York
Track layout
Street map
Station service legend
Symbol	Description
Stops all times	Stops all times
Stops late nights only	Stops late nights only
Stops late nights and weekends	Stops late nights and weekends

The Christopher Street–Stonewall station, formerly known as Christopher Street–Sheridan Square, is a local station on the IRT Broadway–Seventh Avenue Line of the New York City Subway. Located at the intersection of Christopher Street and Seventh Avenue South in the Greenwich Village neighborhood of Manhattan, it is served by the 1 train at all times and by the 2 train during late nights.

The station was built by the Interborough Rapid Transit Company (IRT) as part of the Dual Contracts with New York City, and opened on July 1, 1918. The station had its platforms extended in the 1960s, and was renovated in 1991–1994. The station was renamed after the nearby Stonewall National Monument in June 2024 to commemorate the LGBT rights movement catalyzed by the Stonewall riots, which took place at the nearby Stonewall Inn.

== History ==
=== Construction and opening ===
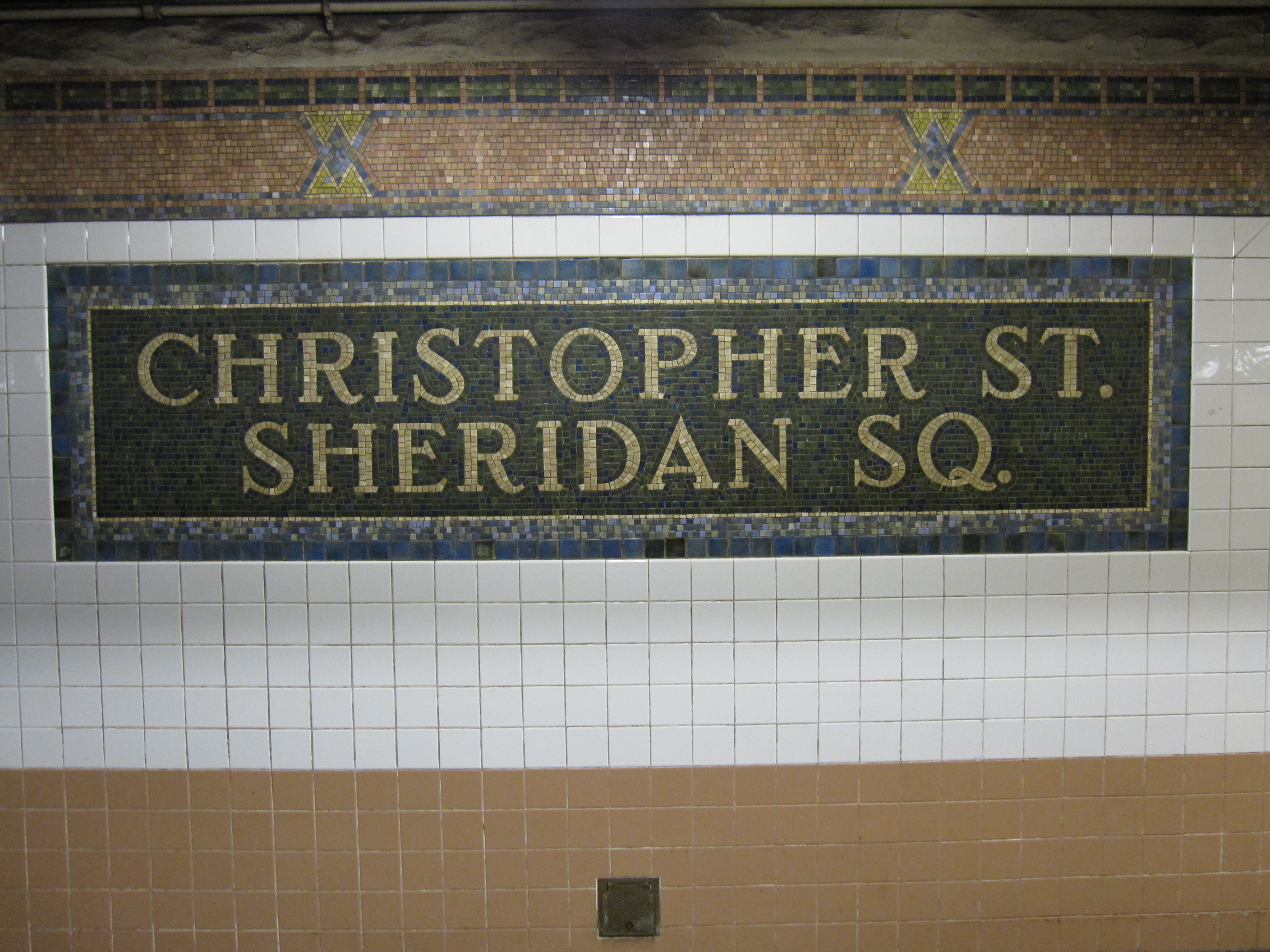
Name of the station in mosaics

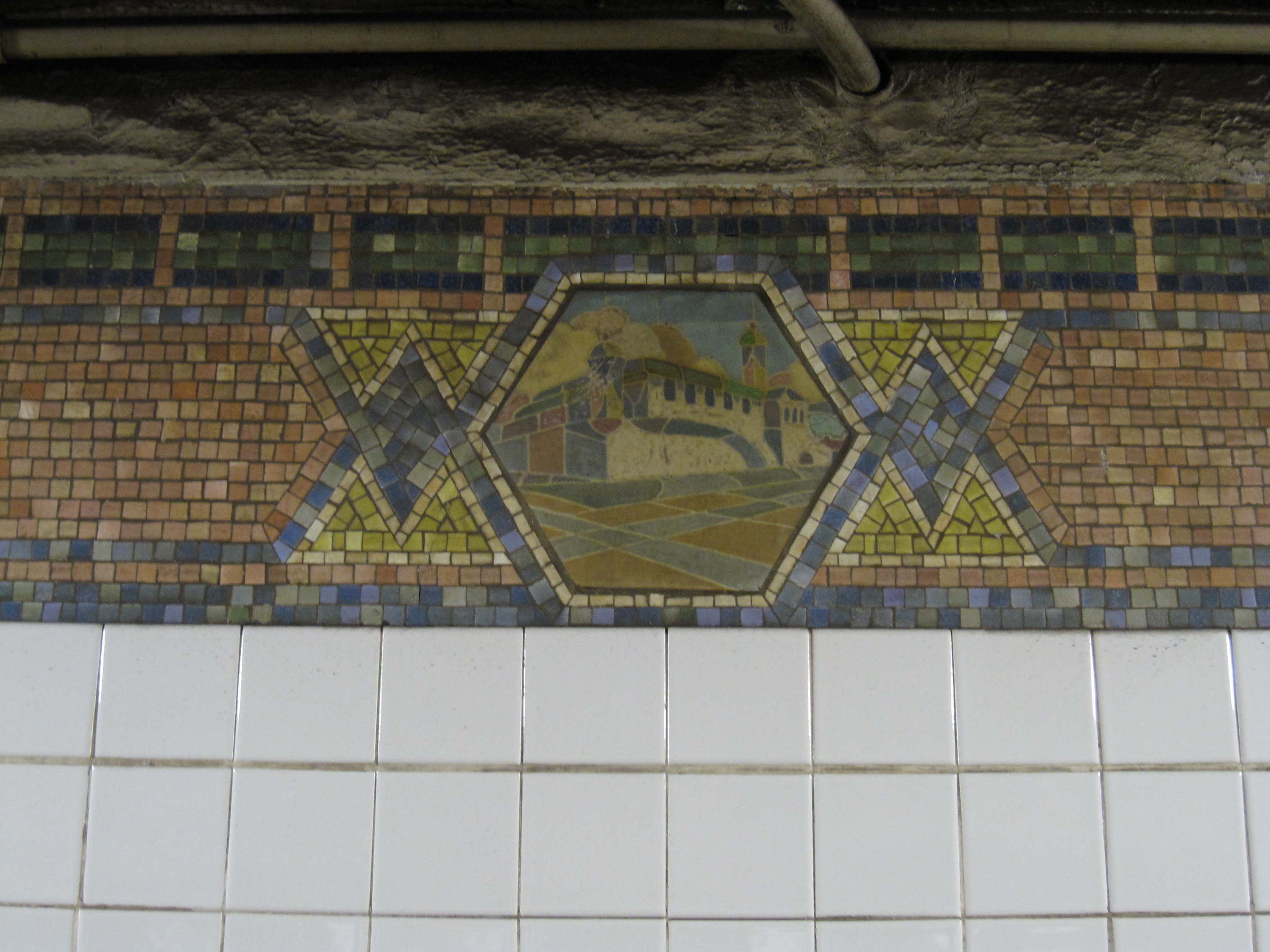
Artwork depicting the old State Penitentiary at West 10th Street

The Dual Contracts, which were signed on March 19, 1913, were contracts for the construction and/or rehabilitation and operation of rapid transit lines in the City of New York. The contracts were "dual" in that they were signed between the City and two separate private companies (the Interborough Rapid Transit Company and the Brooklyn Rapid Transit Company), all working together to make the construction of the Dual Contracts possible. The Dual Contracts promised the construction of several lines in Brooklyn. As part of Contract 4, the IRT agreed to build a branch of the original subway line south down Seventh Avenue, Varick Street, and West Broadway to serve the West Side of Manhattan.

The construction of this line, in conjunction with the construction of the Lexington Avenue Line, would change the operations of the IRT system. Instead of having trains go via Broadway, turning onto 42nd Street, before finally turning onto Park Avenue, there would be two trunk lines connected by the 42nd Street Shuttle. The system would be changed from looking like a "Z" system on a map to an "H" system. One trunk would run via the new Lexington Avenue Line down Park Avenue, and the other trunk would run via the new Seventh Avenue Line up Broadway. In order for the line to continue down Varick Street and West Broadway, these streets needed to be widened, and two new streets were built, the Seventh Avenue Extension and the Varick Street Extension. It was predicted that the subway extension would lead to the growth of the Lower West Side, and to neighborhoods such as Chelsea and Greenwich Village.

In August 1917, the Greenwich Village Public Service Committee requested that the New York Public Service Commission rename the station from Christopher Street to Christopher Street—Sheridan Square. The Public Service Commission voted to make the change on August 20, 1917.

Christopher Street–Sheridan Square opened as part of an extension of the line from 34th Street–Penn Station to South Ferry on July 1, 1918. Initially, the station was served by a shuttle running from Times Square to South Ferry. The new "H" system was implemented on August 1, 1918, joining the two halves of the Broadway–Seventh Avenue Line and sending all West Side trains south from Times Square. An immediate result of the switch was the need to transfer using the 42nd Street Shuttle in order to retrace the original layout. The completion of the "H" system doubled the capacity of the IRT system.

=== Later years ===
The city government took over the IRT's operations on June 12, 1940. On August 9, 1964, the New York City Transit Authority (NYCTA) announced the letting of a $7.6 million contract to lengthen platforms at stations on the Broadway—Seventh Avenue Line from Rector Street to 34th Street–Penn Station, including Christopher Street, and stations from Central Park North–110th Street to 145th Street on the Lenox Avenue Line to allow express trains to be lengthened from nine-car trains to ten-car trains, and to lengthen locals from eight-car trains to ten-car trains. With the completion of this project, the NYCTA project to lengthen IRT stations to accommodate ten-car trains would be complete.

In 1981, the Metropolitan Transportation Authority listed the station among the 69 most deteriorated stations in the subway system. The station was renovated by in-house forces between 1991 and 1994.

In 2023, a bill was introduced in the New York State Legislature to rename the station after the nearby Stonewall National Monument. The state legislature voted in June 2024 to allow the station to be renamed Christopher Street–Stonewall station. The new name would commemorate the LGBT rights movement catalyzed by the Stonewall riots, which took place at the nearby Stonewall Inn. The station was officially renamed on June 28, 2024. During mid-2026, when the adjacent portion of the Broadway–Seventh Avenue Line was closed during weekends, the MTA rehabilitated the Christopher Street–Stonewall station.

== Station layout ==
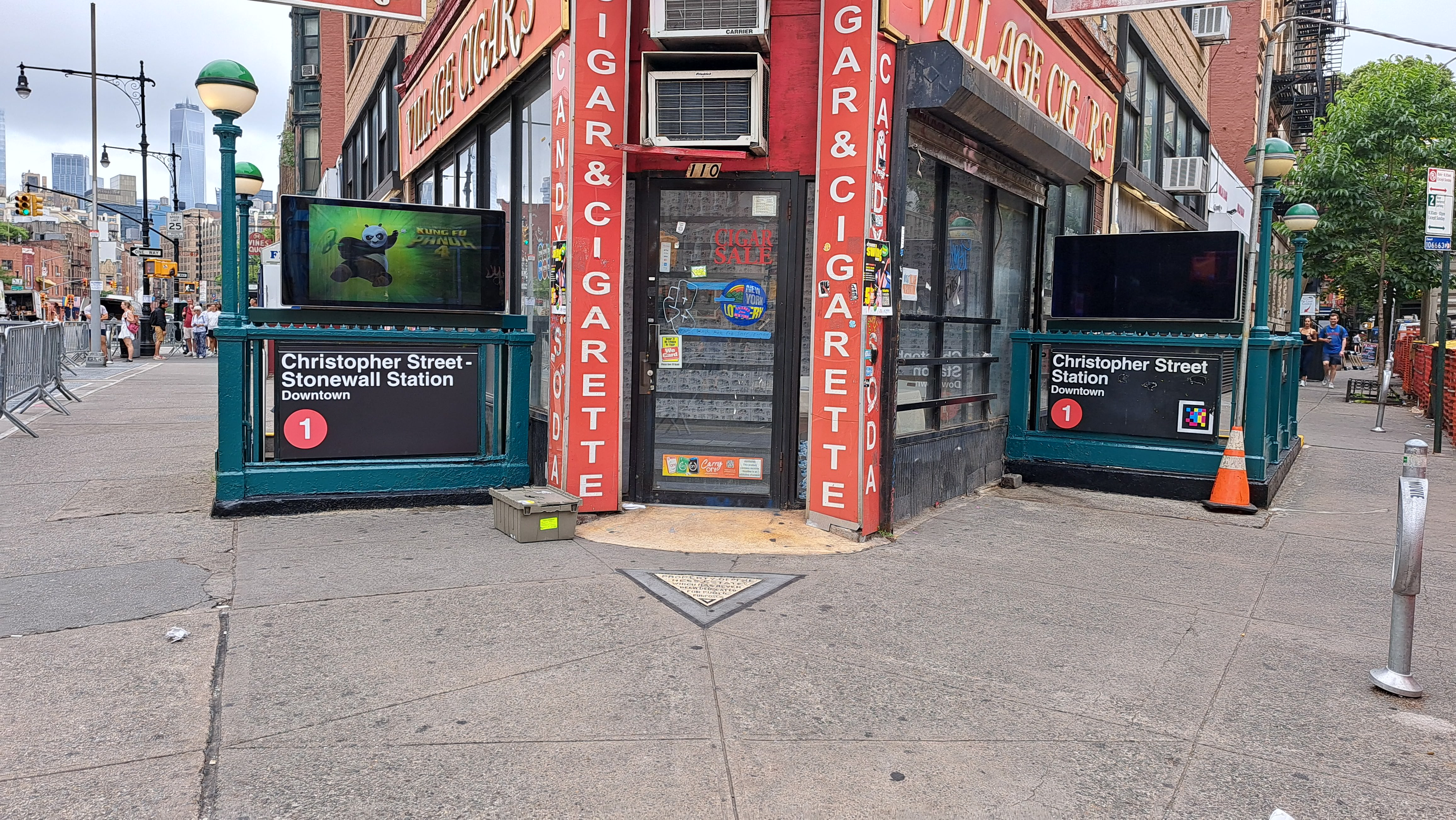
Downtown entrance of Christopher Street–Stonewall station (formerly Christopher Street–Sheridan Square)

This underground station has two side platforms and four tracks. The station is served by the 1 at all times and by the 2 during late nights; the center express tracks are used by the 2 and 3 trains during daytime hours. The station is between 14th Street to the north and Houston Street to the south.

Both platforms have the standard IRT trim line and mosaic name tablets reading "CHRISTOPHER ST. SHERIDAN SQ." on two lines. The columns are painted dark green with every other one having the standard black station name plate with white lettering. There are also signs directing to New York University. Fixed platform barriers, which are intended to prevent commuters falling to the tracks, are positioned near the platform edges.

The station features a site specific artwork, entitled Greenwich Village Murals, created in 1994 by Lower East Side artist Lee Brozgol and the students of Public School 41. It features twelve mosaic frame panels on the platform walls depicting the history of Greenwich Village. The names of some of these panels include "Bohemians", "Rebels", "Founders", and "Providers".

=== Exits ===
Each platform has one fare control area at the center containing a turnstile bank and token booth. There is no free transfer between directions. The South Ferry-bound fare control has four street stairs to the diagonal intersection of Christopher Street and Seventh Avenue: two to the northwestern corner and two to the southwestern one. The Bronx-bound fare control has a single staircase to the island formed by Seventh Avenue, West Fourth Street, and Grove Street.

== Nearby points of interest ==
The Stonewall National Monument, encompassing Christopher Park and the Stonewall Inn, is across West Fourth Street from the Bronx-bound entrance.

The Hess triangle, a small triangular-shaped plaque in the sidewalk with one 65-centimeter (26 in) side and two 70-centimeter (28 in) sides, is located outside the South Ferry-bound entrances at the southwest corner of Christopher Street and Seventh Avenue South.
