= 34th Street–Penn Station (IND Eighth Avenue Line) =

New York City Subway station in Manhattan

34 Street–Penn Station
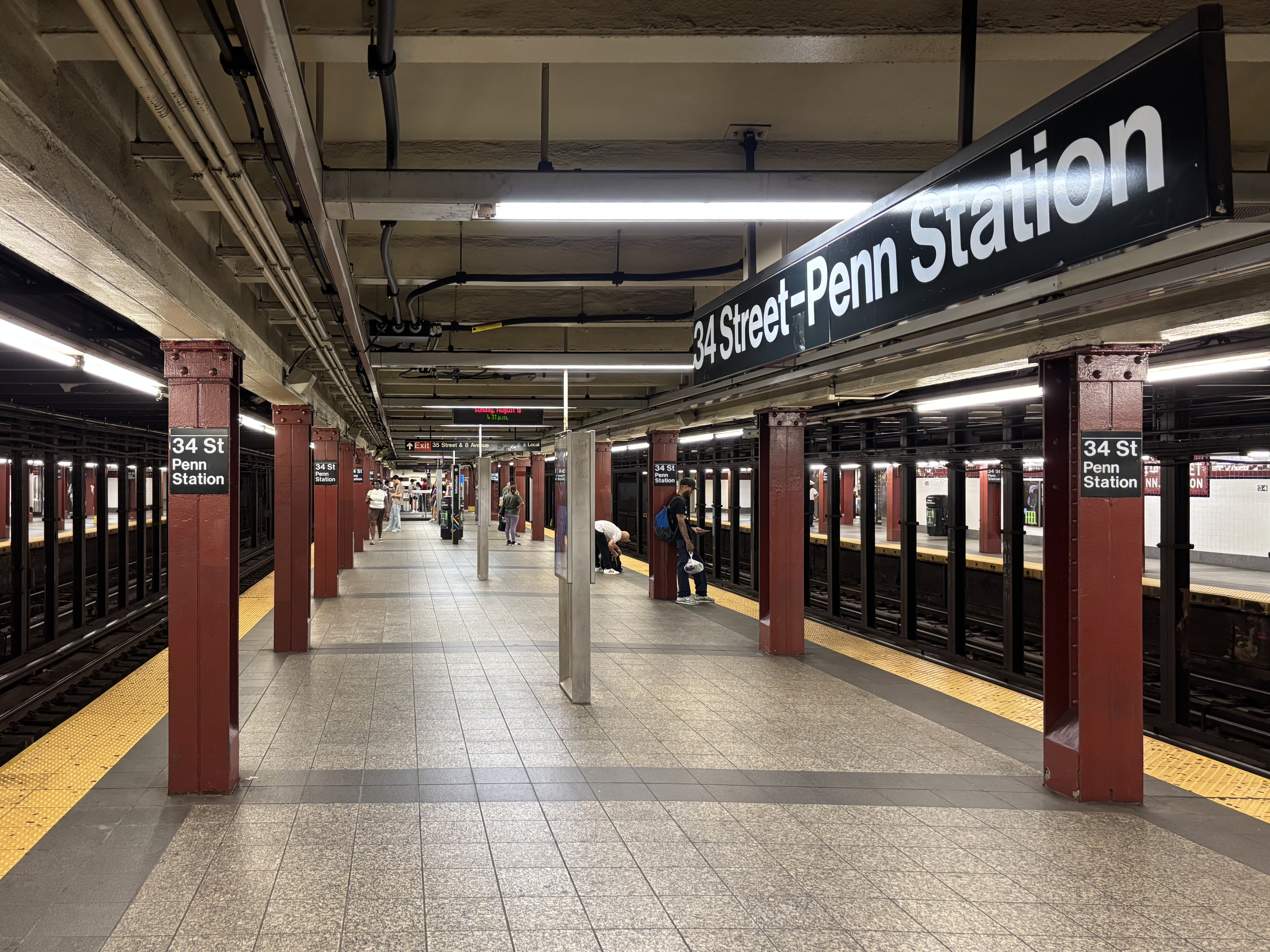
- Express platform, facing north

Station statistics
- Address: West 34th Street & Eighth Avenue; New York, New York
- Borough: Manhattan
- Locale: Midtown Manhattan
- Coordinates: 40.752166°N 73.993521°W
- Division: B (IND)
- Line: IND Eighth Avenue Line
- Services: A (all times); C (all except late nights); E (all times)
- Transit: NYCT Bus: M7, M20, M34 SBS, M34A SBS, SIM23, SIM24; MTA Bus: Q32; FlixBus; PATH: JSQ–33, HOB–33, JSQ–33 (via HOB) (at 33rd Street); Amtrak, LIRR, NJT Rail (at Penn Station)
- Structure: Underground
- Platforms: 2 side platforms (local); 1 island platform (express)
- Tracks: 4

Other information
- Opened: September 10, 1932; 94 years ago
- Accessible: Yes

Traffic
- 2025: 19,915,971 ▲9%
- Rank: 6 out of 423
Services
Preceding station	New York City Subway	Following station
42nd Street–Port Authority Bus Terminal A C E services split	Express	14th Street A C toward Far Rockaway–Mott Avenue or Ozone Park–Lefferts Boulevard
42nd Street–Port Authority Bus Terminal A C E services split	Local	23rd Street A C E via Canal Street
Location
Location within New York City Subway
Location within New York City
Location within New York
Track layout
Street map
Station service legend
Symbol	Description
Stops all times except late nights	Stops all times except late nights
Stops all times	Stops all times
Stops late nights only	Stops late nights only

34th Street–Penn Station is an express station on the IND Eighth Avenue Line of the New York City Subway, located at the intersection of 34th Street and Eighth Avenue in Midtown Manhattan. It is served by the A and E trains at all times, and by the C train at all times except late nights. The station is adjacent to Pennsylvania Station, the busiest railroad station in the United States as well as a major transfer point to Amtrak, NJ Transit, and the Long Island Rail Road.

== History ==
=== Construction and opening ===
New York City mayor John Francis Hylan's original plans for the Independent Subway System (IND), proposed in 1922, included building over 100 miles (160 km) of new lines and taking over nearly 100 miles (160 km) of existing lines. The lines were designed to compete with the existing underground, surface, and elevated lines operated by the IRT and Brooklyn–Manhattan Transit Corporation (BMT). On December 9, 1924, the New York City Board of Transportation (BOT) gave preliminary approval to the construction of a subway line along Eighth Avenue, running from 207th Street. The BOT announced a list of stations on the new line in February 1928, with an express station at 33rd Street.

Most of the Eighth Avenue Line was dug using a cheap cut-and-cover method, including 34th Street–Penn Station. During the station's construction, workers found remnants of an old stream that had originated at Herald Square and flowed through the area. The stream was diverted into a sewer, and concrete waterproofing was installed below the 34th Street station's mezzanine. In addition, the subway line had to pass above the tracks of Penn Station. The finishes at the four stations between 14th and 42nd Street were 21 percent completed by May 1930. By that August, the BOT reported that the Eighth Avenue Line was nearly completed and that the four stations from 14th to 42nd Street were 99.8 percent completed. The entire line was completed by September 1931, except for the installation of turnstiles.

A preview event for the new subway was hosted on September 8, 1932, two days before the official opening. The Eighth Avenue Line station opened on September 10, 1932, as part of the city-operated IND's initial segment, the Eighth Avenue Line between Chambers Street and 207th Street. The construction of the Eighth Avenue Line caused real-estate values along Eighth Avenue to increase by as much as 400 percent.

=== Later years ===
The station's token booths were shuttered in May 2005, after fare tokens were replaced with MetroCards; station agents were deployed elsewhere in the station to answer passengers' queries. This was part of a pilot program that was tested at seven other stations.

Under the 2015–2019 MTA Capital Plan, the station, along with thirty-two other New York City Subway stations, underwent a complete overhaul as part of the Enhanced Station Initiative. Updates included cellular service, Wi-Fi, charging stations, improved signage, and improved station lighting. Unlike other stations that were renovated under the initiative, 34th Street–Penn Station was not completely closed during construction. In January 2018, the NYCT and Bus Committee recommended that Judlau Contracting receive the $125 million contract for the renovations of 57th and 23rd Streets on the IND Sixth Avenue Line; 28th Street on the IRT Lexington Avenue Line, and 34th Street–Penn Station on the IRT Broadway–Seventh Avenue Line and IND Eighth Avenue Line. However, the MTA Board temporarily deferred the vote for these packages after city representatives refused to vote to award the contracts. The contract was put back for a vote in February, where it was ultimately approved. These improvements were substantially completed by May 2019.

The station entrance painted blue and orange as part of the 2026 NBA Finals

Ahead of the 2026 NBA Finals, the stairwell entrance at the southeast corner of 34th Street and Eighth Avenue was painted blue and orange, the colors of the New York Knicks basketball team, which play at the neighboring Madison Square Garden. The entrance immediately gained popularity among Knicks fans, and models of the repainted entrance were sold. On August 18, Vornado Realty Trust proposed relocating the entrance at the northeast corner of 34th Street and Eighth Avenue into a new building it was developing there, at 484 Eighth Avenue.

== Station layout ==
This station has two side platforms for local service and a center island platform for express service. Atlantic Avenue–Barclays Center on the IRT Eastern Parkway Line and 34th Street–Penn Station on the IRT Broadway–Seventh Avenue Line are the only other stations in the system with this configuration. This is due to the expected increase in ridership and to encourage riders to switch at the next stop northbound, 42nd Street–Port Authority Bus Terminal, as it is set up in the usual island platform manner for cross-platform interchanges. There is no free transfer between this station and the station of the same name on the IRT Broadway–Seventh Avenue Line, despite the fact that both connect to Penn Station. The nearest transfer location is at 42nd Street–Port Authority Bus Terminal with a free transfer to Times Square–42nd Street.

The station is served by A and E trains at all times, and by C trains except at night. A trains use the express tracks during the day and the local tracks during the night, while C and E trains always use the local tracks. The next station to the north is 42nd Street–Port Authority Bus Terminal for all service, while the next station to the south is 23rd Street for local trains and 14th Street for express trains.

South of the station, an additional track begins at a bumper block between the two express tracks with a connection to both at both ends (about 25th Street on the south end and 33rd Street on the north end). This allows for various extra movements of trains including storage or removal of a train with mechanical problems to be sent back in the other direction. It could also be used if 34th Street functioned as a terminal station.

The walls of the station contain red-tile bands bordered in black; since 34th Street is an express station, it has a wider tile band than local stations. The tile colors are intended to help riders identify their station more easily, part of a color-coded tile system for the entire Independent Subway System. The tile colors were designed to facilitate navigation for travelers going away from Lower Manhattan; on the Eighth Avenue Line, the tiles change color at the next express station to the north. Because the next station to the north, 42nd Street–Port Authority Bus Terminal, is an express station, the adjacent stations to the north and south both used different tile colors.

The stations on the Eighth Avenue Line were built with 600 feet (180 m) long platforms, but there were provisions to lengthen them to 660 feet (200 m) to accommodate eleven-car trains. Below the red band are small tile captions reading "34" in stretched Arial font, though these are not original to the station. Originally, the station had no trim line and the tile captions were in the standard IND caption font. The original mosaic name tablets, however, are still visible, being surrounded by new black tiles; the mosaics read "34TH STREET PENN. STATION" broken onto two lines on a claret background and same claret border. Red I-beam columns run along all the platforms at regular intervals, alternating ones having the standard black station name plate with white lettering.

Like other subway stations, 34th Street–Penn Station includes black-and-white "sighting boards" for conductors to point and call, thereby indicating to the motorman that the train has stopped at the right position. On the downtown express platform, there is a blue-and-white sighting board for the R110B, a now-retired prototype New Technology Train whose conductor's cab was not aligned with any other fleet's conductors' cabs. This board is still extant and is one of a few publicly visible remnants of the R110B's operation.

33rd St to 34th St subway cross-section
11th Av	10th & 9th Avs are skipped	Farley Building & Moynihan Train Hall	8th Av	Madison Square; Garden	7th Av	Storefronts	6th Av & Broadway		5th & Madison Avs are skipped	Park Av
mezzanine	10th & 9th Avs are skipped	train hall	A/C/E	concourse	1/2/3	Former Gimbel's passageway	mezz	PATH	5th & Madison Avs are skipped	6/<6>
mezzanine	10th & 9th Avs are skipped	conc	mezzanine	concourse	mezzanine		N/Q/R/W		5th & Madison Avs are skipped
7/<7>	10th & 9th Avs are skipped	Penn Station (platform level)					B/D/F/<F>/M		5th & Madison Avs are skipped

=== Exits ===
34th Street–Penn Station spans three streets (33rd, 34th, and 35th Streets) with a set of entrances/exits at all of these streets. For the purposes of this article, entrance and exit are interchangeable. When the station opened, it contained 17 entrances and exits, more than almost any other station on the Eighth Avenue Line except for Chambers Street/Hudson Terminal.

At 35th Street is a part-time booth entrance. Each local platform has its own fare control. On the local platforms, there are High Entry-Exit Turnstiles for these exits at platform level. There is a narrow underpass connecting the platforms inside fare control. The northbound platform has two street stairs to the northeast corner of 35th Street and Eighth Avenue, and one to the southeast corner. The southbound platform has two street stairs to the northwest corner of 35th Street and Eighth Avenue, and one to the southwest corner.

At 34th Street is a part-time booth entrance. Each local platform has its own fare control. There is an underpass connecting the platforms inside fare control, and it leads to the LIRR West Side Concourse outside of fare control. There is also a passageway providing out-of-system access to the station of the same name on the IRT Broadway–Seventh Avenue Line. The northbound platform has one street stair to each eastern corner of 34th Street and Eighth Avenue. The southbound platform has one street stair to each western corner of 34th Street and Eighth Avenue. There is a single elevator to the northbound platform at the southeastern corner of the intersection, connecting to that platform's fare control. Inside fare control, three elevators from each platform go down to the underpass. There was a tunnel linking to the New Yorker Hotel at the northwest corner of the intersection, which opened in 1930 and was closed by the 1960s; it later became a storage area.

At 33rd Street is the full-time entrance, with token booths on both sides; the full-time booth is on the northbound platform. All three platforms have their own fare control. The underpass connecting the platforms is outside fare control. The northbound local platform's fare control leads to a street stair to the northeast corner of 33rd Street and Eighth Avenue, as well as a direct passageway to the basement of Penn Station/Madison Square Garden. The southbound local platform's fare control leads to a street stair to the northwest corner of 33rd Street and Eighth Avenue, as well as a double-wide granite staircase at the southwest corner (in a plaza outside the James A. Farley Post Office Building). A passageway connects the Eighth Avenue Line station with the Moynihan Train Hall, which opened in 2021.

== Gallery ==
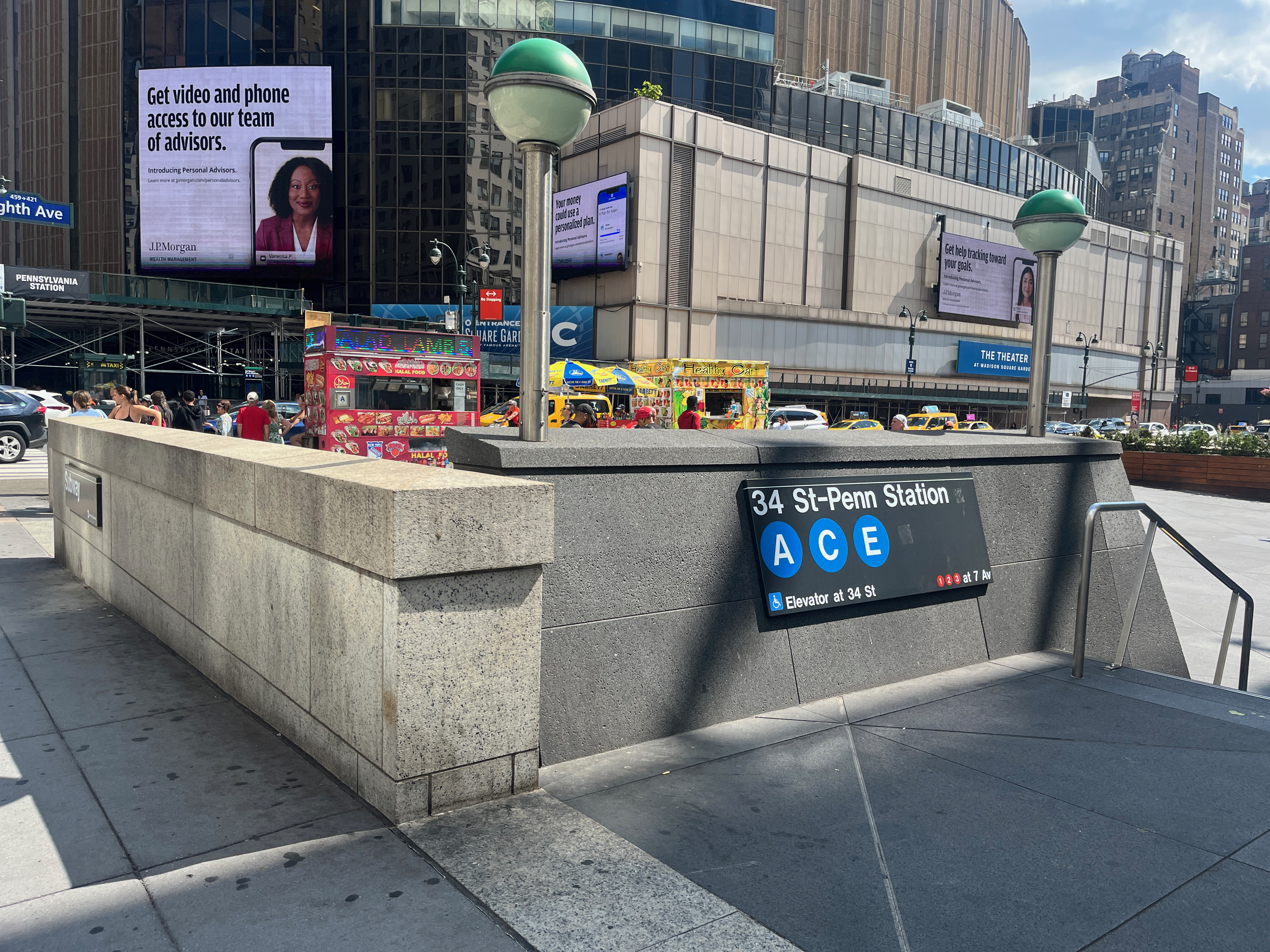
Entrance outside Moynihan Train Hall

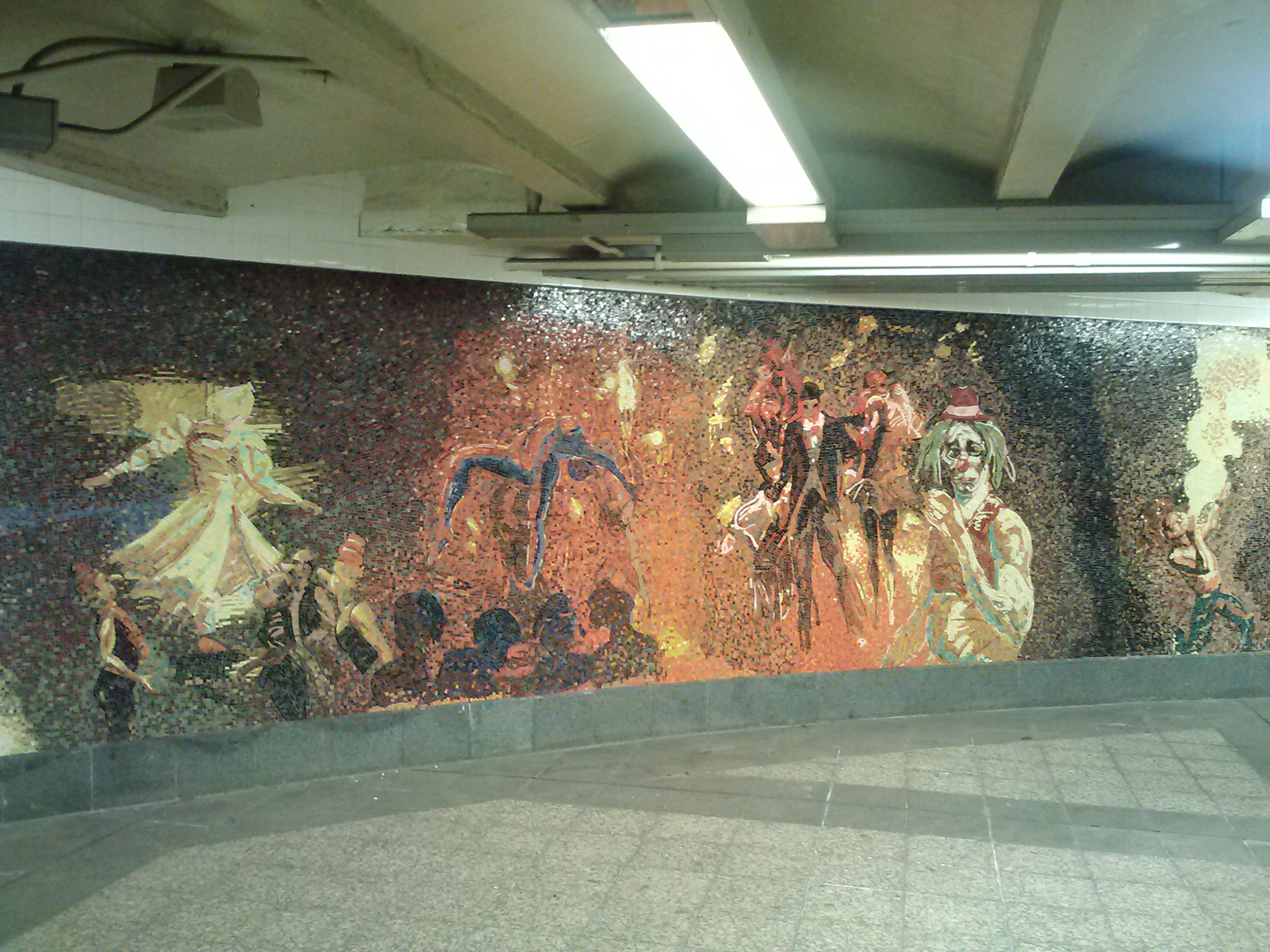
Detail of "The Garden of Circus Delights" mosaic beneath the platforms

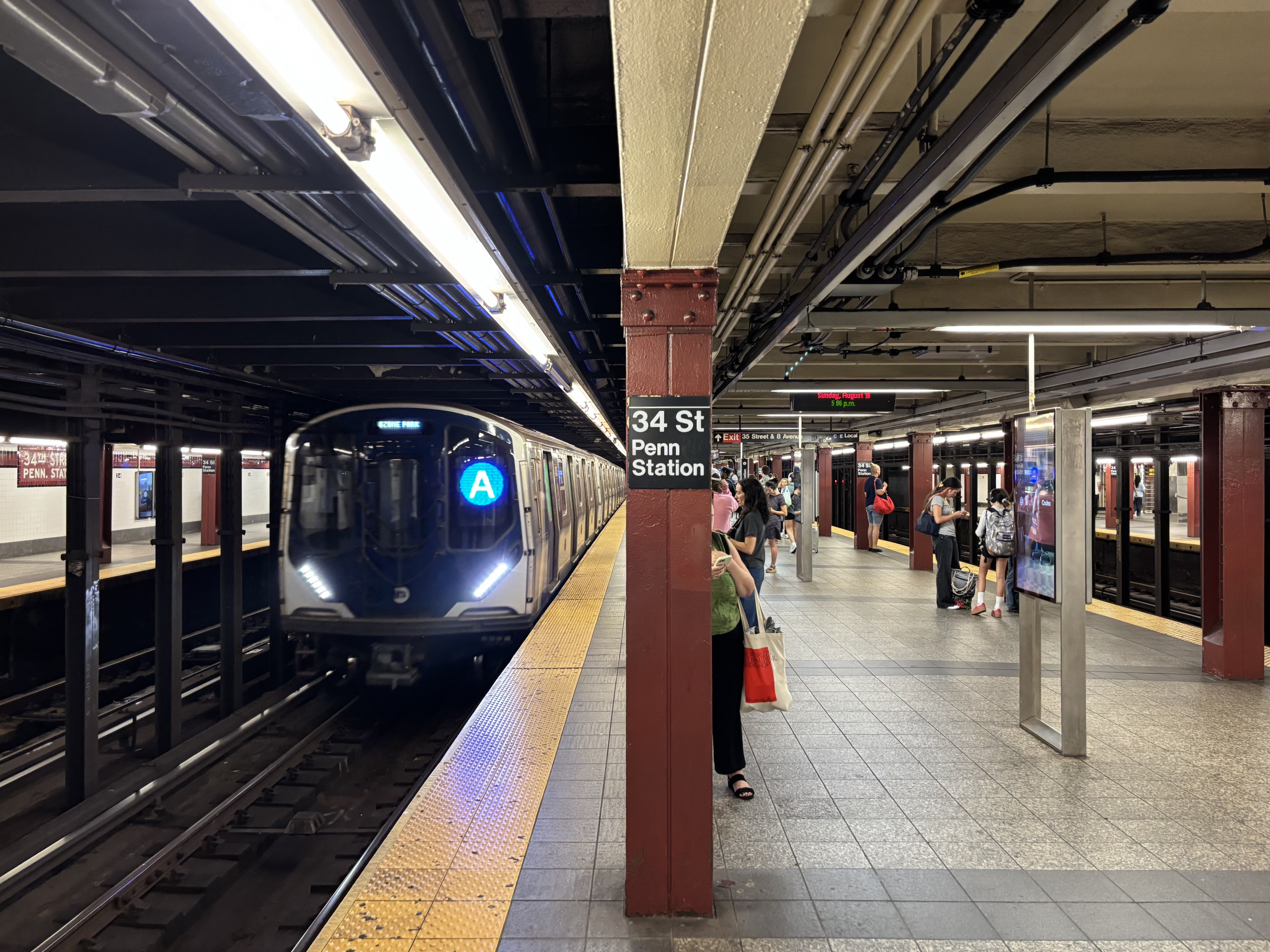
Southbound R211A A train arriving
