= Christopher Street station (PATH) =

Port Authority Trans-Hudson rail station

Christopher Street
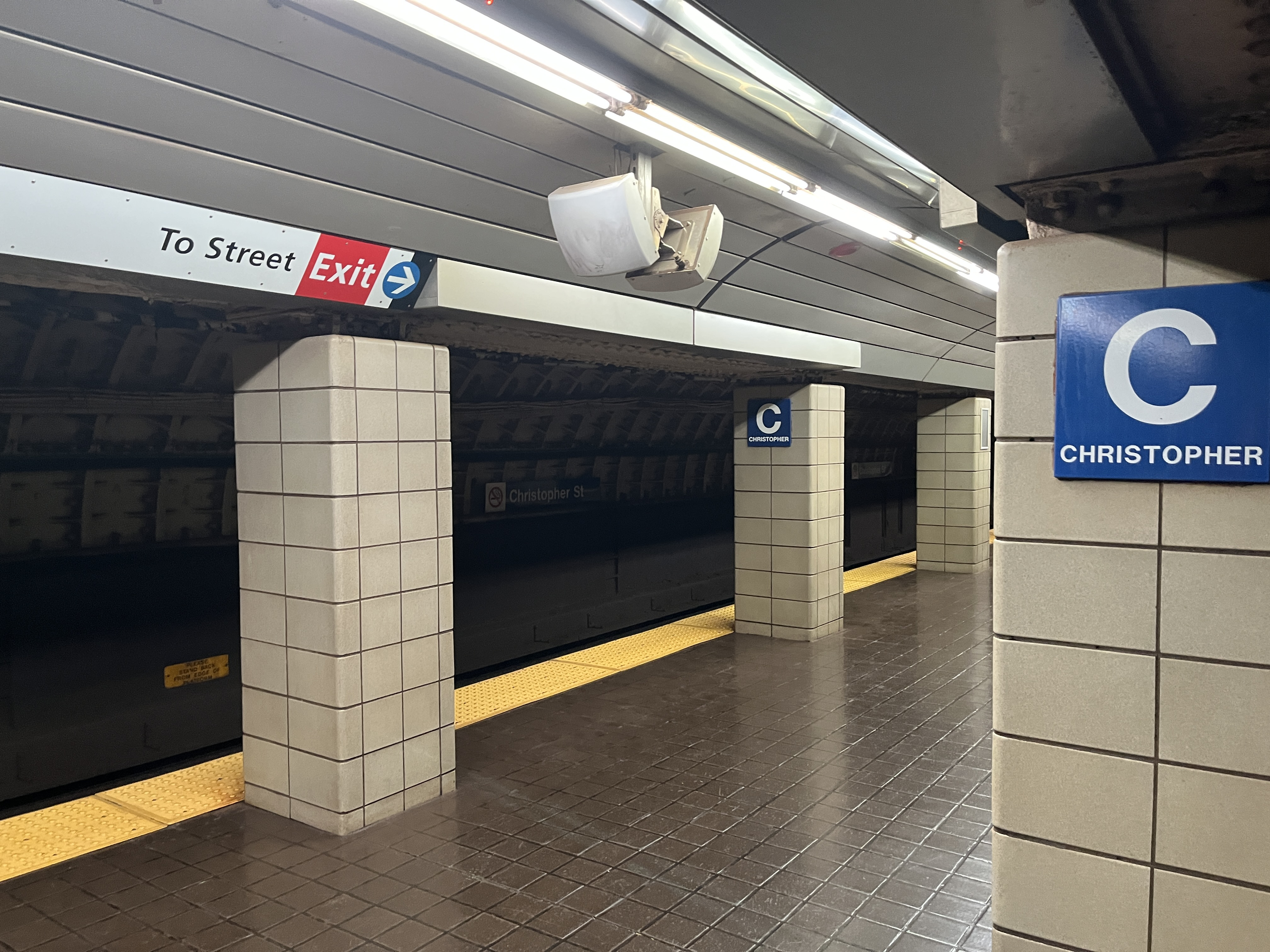
- The station platform as seen in 2022

General information
- Location: 137 Christopher Street; Manhattan, New York
- Coordinates: 40.733602°N 74.006821°W
- System: Underground
- Owner: Port Authority of New York and New Jersey
- Line: Uptown Hudson Tubes
- Platforms: 1 island platform
- Tracks: 2
- Connections: New York City Subway: at Christopher Street–Stonewall; NYCT Bus: M8, M20

Construction
- Accessible: No

History
- Opened: February 25, 1908
- Rebuilt: June 2, 1986–September 1, 1986

Passengers
- 2025: 1,371,115 ▲3.6%
- Rank: 12 of 13

Services
Preceding station	PATH	Following station
Hoboken Terminus	HOB–33	Ninth Street toward 33rd Street
Newport toward Journal Square	JSQ–33	Ninth Street toward 33rd Street
Late-nights
Hoboken toward Journal Square	JSQ–33 (via HOB)	Ninth Street toward 33rd Street
Track layout
Location

Christopher Street station is a station on the PATH system. Located at 137 Christopher Street between Greenwich and Hudson Streets in the Greenwich Village neighborhood of Manhattan, New York City, it is served by the Hoboken–33rd Street and Journal Square–33rd Street lines during the daytime, and by the Journal Square–33rd Street (via Hoboken) line during late nights and weekend mornings.

== History ==
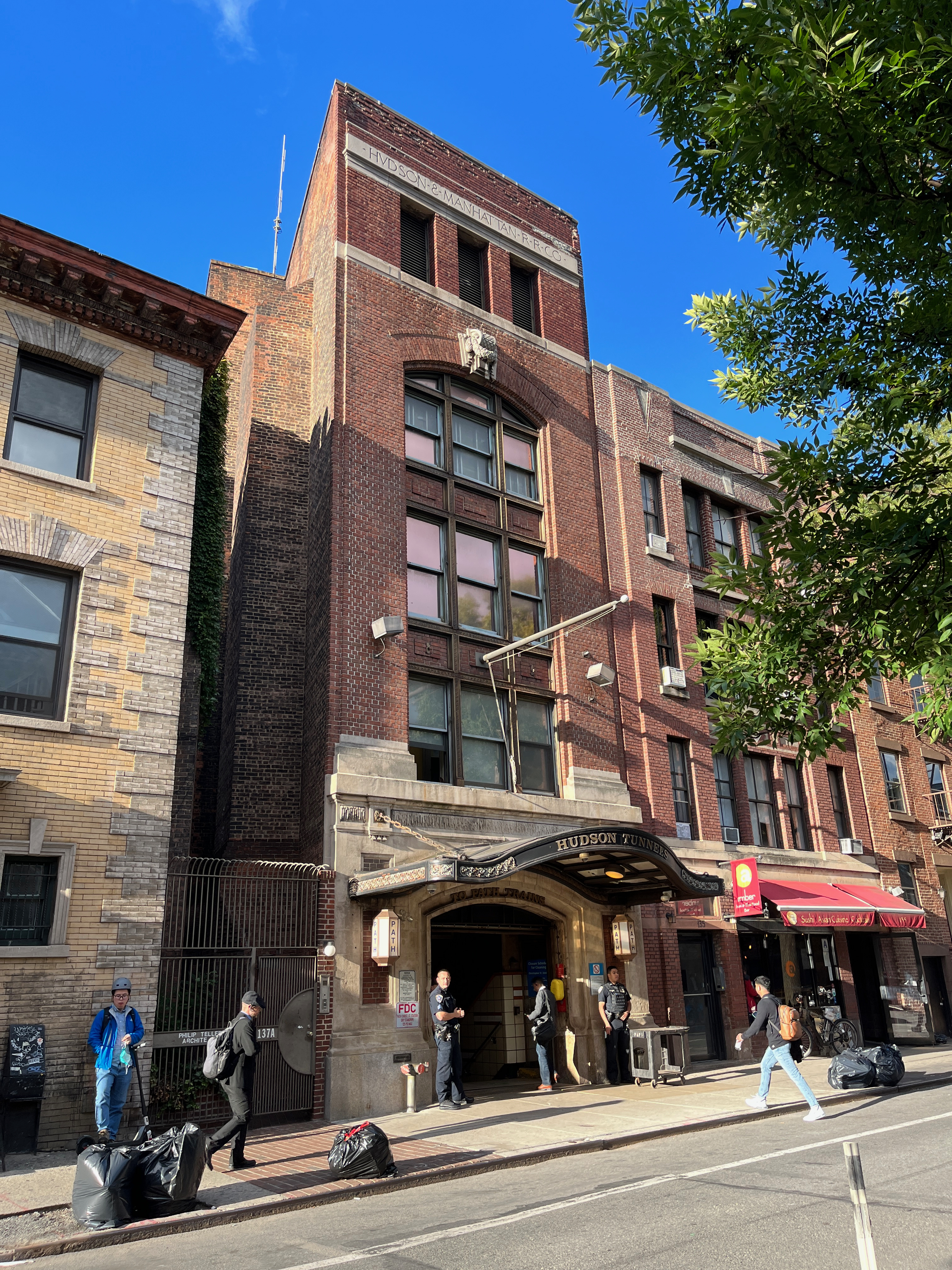
Entrance

The station opened on February 25, 1908, as part of the Hudson and Manhattan Railroad extension between New Jersey and 33rd Street. It received a renovation in 1986, during which the station was closed completely from June 2–September 1, along with the 14th Street station.

The station has long seen heavy traffic not only from passengers going to Jersey City and Hoboken, but also by Manhattan residents traveling from Greenwich Village to Midtown. The nearest subway station, Christopher Street-Stonewall, is two blocks away. The already busy station received even more passengers after the September 11, 2001 attacks, which resulted in the destruction of the World Trade Center PATH station. With Christopher Street becoming the closest PATH station to New Jersey, it started experiencing serious overcrowding. In 2002, Christopher Street station was used by an average of 7,400 people per day, or about 2.701 million per year. This was more than twice as many as the 1.314 million passengers that used the station during 2001. The Port Authority had to make it an exit-only station during the morning rush hour.

In 2002, the Port Authority announced plans to build a second entrance at Christopher and Bedford Street (a block and a half east of the current entrance), to ease overcrowding at the station. The project would have included a 75-by-25-foot (22.9 by 7.6 m) mezzanine, in addition to a staircase. The Port Authority would have spent $29.6 million on the project, which also included new entrances at the Ninth Street station. Residents expressed concerns that the project would endanger the surrounding neighborhood's fragile historic buildings (through the vibrations that a major construction project would cause) and disrupt business and traffic. Local opposition caused the project to be canceled.

== Station layout ==
The station has one island platform and two tracks. The station entrance is in its own free-standing building, with a restored marquee displaying the original "Hudson Tunnels" name adorning the entranceway. Passengers descend a narrow stairway with several curves before arriving at the southwest end of the narrow center island platform.

Biff Elrod's mural "Ascent-Descent" (showing images of users of the PATH trains, ascending or descending the stairs) was originally painted on site in August 1986 as a temporary installation for the Public Art Fund, and later purchased by the Port Authority of New York and New Jersey, was restored in 1999.
