= Ninth Street station (PATH) =

Port Authority Trans-Hudson rail station

9th Street
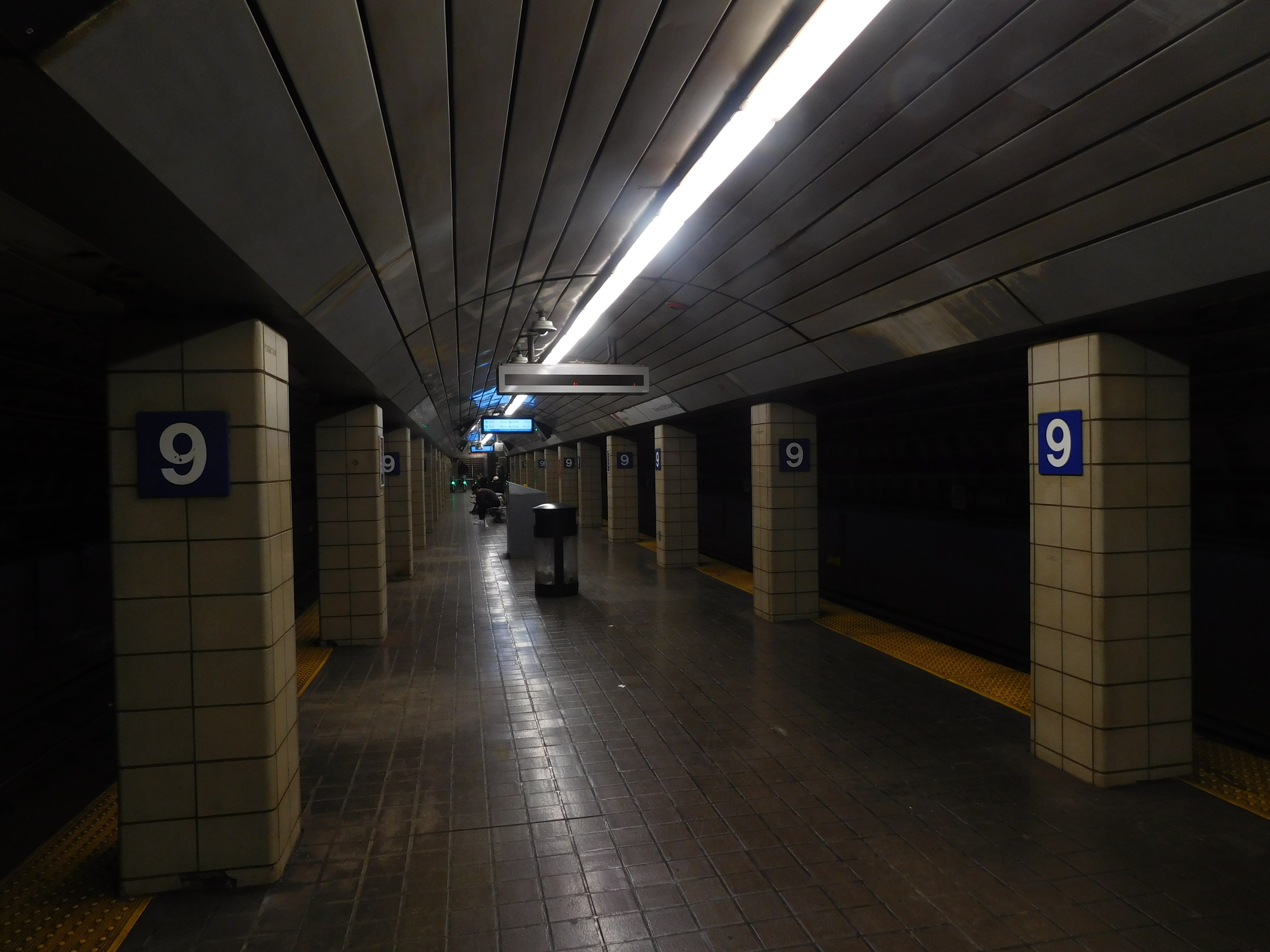
- Platform level at Ninth Street in March 2026.

General information
- Location: Ninth Street and Sixth Avenue; Manhattan, New York
- Coordinates: 40.7341°N 73.9997°W
- Owner: Port Authority of New York and New Jersey
- Line: Uptown Hudson Tubes
- Platforms: 1 island platform
- Tracks: 2
- Connections: New York City Subway: at West Fourth Street–Washington Square; at Christopher Street–Stonewall; NYCT Bus: M8, M55

Construction
- Structure type: Underground
- Accessible: No

History
- Opened: February 25, 1908

Passengers
- 2025: 1,251,623 ▲4.8%
- Rank: 13 of 13

Services
Preceding station	PATH	Following station
Christopher Street toward Hoboken	HOB–33	14th Street toward 33rd Street
Christopher Street toward Journal Square	JSQ–33	14th Street toward 33rd Street
Late-nights
Christopher Street toward Journal Square	JSQ–33 (via HOB)	14th Street toward 33rd Street
Track layout
Location

Ninth Street station is a station on the PATH system. Located at the intersection of 9th Street and Sixth Avenue (Avenue of the Americas) in the Greenwich Village neighborhood of Manhattan, New York City, it is served by the Hoboken–33rd Street and Journal Square–33rd Street lines during the daytime, and by the Journal Square–33rd Street (via Hoboken) line during late nights and weekend mornings.

== History ==
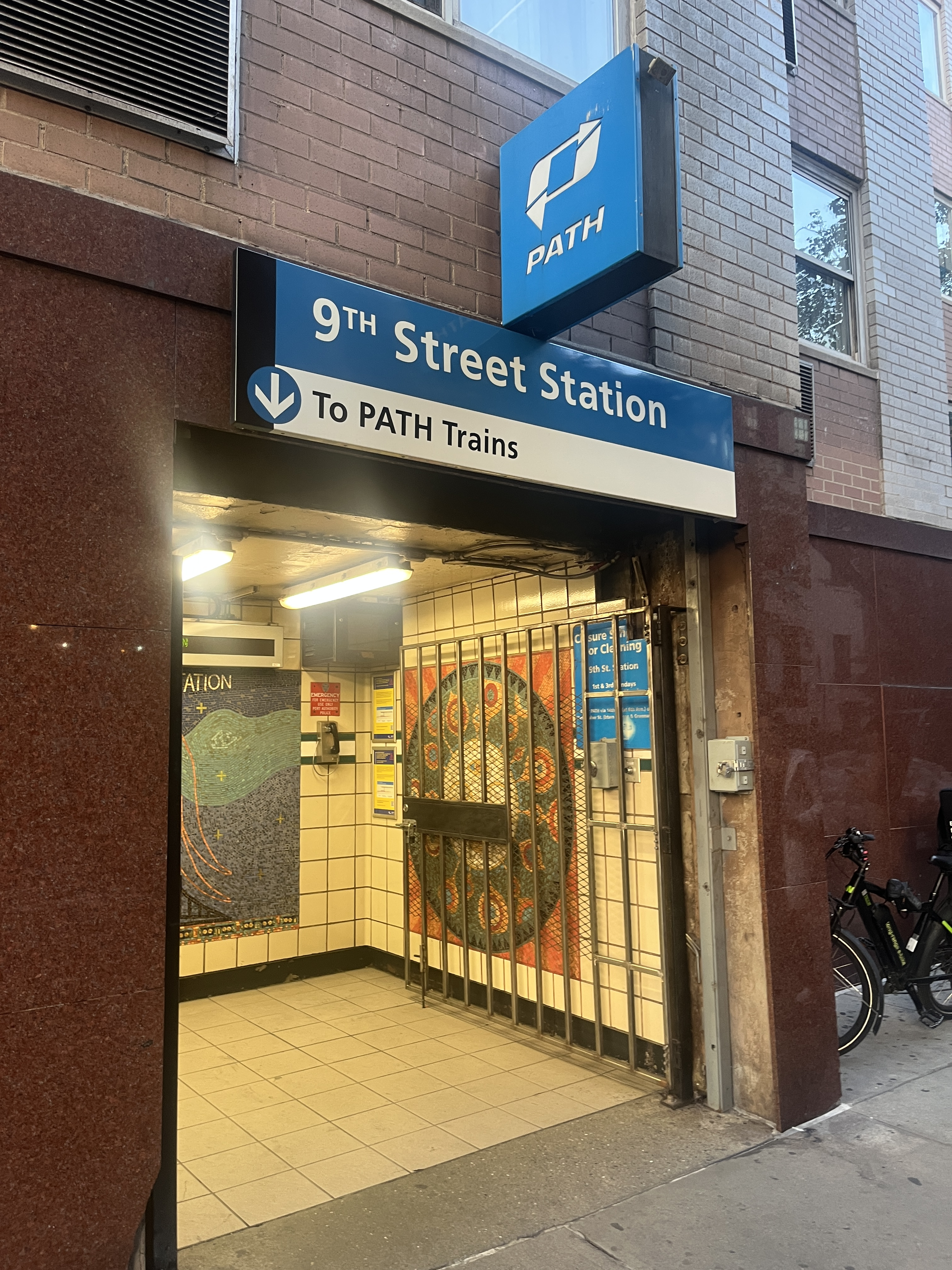
Street entrance

The construction of the Ninth Street station was particularly difficult. In 1900, construction workers for the Hudson and Manhattan Railroad (H&M), the PATH's predecessor, had to navigate quicksand formed from the water of the former Minetta Creek above it. They could not break the surface of Sixth Avenue, which would have disrupted traffic. In 1907, the Degnon Contracting Company was building an extension to the H&M Railroad north of 9th Street and declared the water to have dried up, to the relief of area property owners who had previously spent thousands of dollars on pumps to rid their properties of water.

The station opened on February 25, 1908, as part of the H&M extension between New Jersey and 33rd Street. Originally, there was an exit on the west side of Sixth Avenue between Waverly Place and Greenwich Avenue. The exit had been removed by 1941.

After the September 11, 2001 attacks, which resulted in the destruction of the vital World Trade Center station, Ninth Street experienced serious overcrowding. In 2002, Ninth Street was used by an average of 8,900 people per day, about 3.248 million per annum. This was 54% higher than the 1.496 million passengers that utilized this station in 2001.

In 2002, the Port Authority announced plans to build a second entrance at Christopher Street and Waverly Place (two blocks west of the current entrance), to ease overcrowding at the station. The project would have included a 75-by-25-foot (22.9 by 7.6 m) mezzanine, in addition to a staircase. The Port Authority would have spent $29.6 million on the project, which also included new entrances at the Christopher Street station. Residents expressed concerns that the project would endanger the surrounding neighborhood's fragile historic buildings (through the vibrations that a major construction project would cause) and disrupt business and traffic. Furthermore, the new entrances would have been within an intersection that was protected as part of a historic district around the Stonewall Inn. Though the New York State Office of Parks, Recreation and Historic Preservation had determined that the new entrances would not affect the historic district's appearance, preservationists opposed the entrances. Local opposition caused the project to be canceled. After a new station near the World Trade Center reopened in 2003, the Port Authority again planned to build a second entrance at the station.

== Station layout ==
In keeping with the "style" of PATH station entrances in Manhattan, the Ninth Street entrance is in the side of a building on the east side of Sixth Avenue. Passengers travel down a number of stairwells and through a narrow curved tunnel before descending to the north end of the platform. This underground station has two tracks and a center island platform. It is located under Christopher Street, just southwest of where the PATH tracks curve under 6th Avenue. The IND Sixth Avenue Line's local tracks are to the east of the PATH tracks, and the express tracks underneath, and are not visible from this station.

Just east of the station, the tracks curve north onto Sixth Avenue, while the tunnel continues straight, a provision for a level junction with a never-built branch line that would have run to Astor Place on the IRT Lexington Avenue Line. The bellmouth for the proposed Astor Place connection north of this station runs for about 250 feet (76 m). Large portions of the ring erecting machine from the original tunnel construction is in the bellmouth for the proposed extension, and the tunnel is also filled with equipment.

== Nearby attractions ==
- Jefferson Market Library
- The New School
- New York University
- Washington Square Park
