= New York subway (disambiguation) =

New York subway generally refers to the New York City Subway.

It can also refer to:

- Uptown Hudson Tubes that carry underground PATH trains between New Jersey to 33rd Street
- North River Tunnels to carry trains from New Jersey to Manhattan
- East River Tunnels to carry trains from Long Island to Manhattan

Outside New York City:

- Buffalo Metro Rail subway segment in Buffalo, New York
- Rochester Subway, an abandoned subway in Rochester, New York
