= 14th Street station (PATH) =

Port Authority Trans-Hudson rail station

14th Street
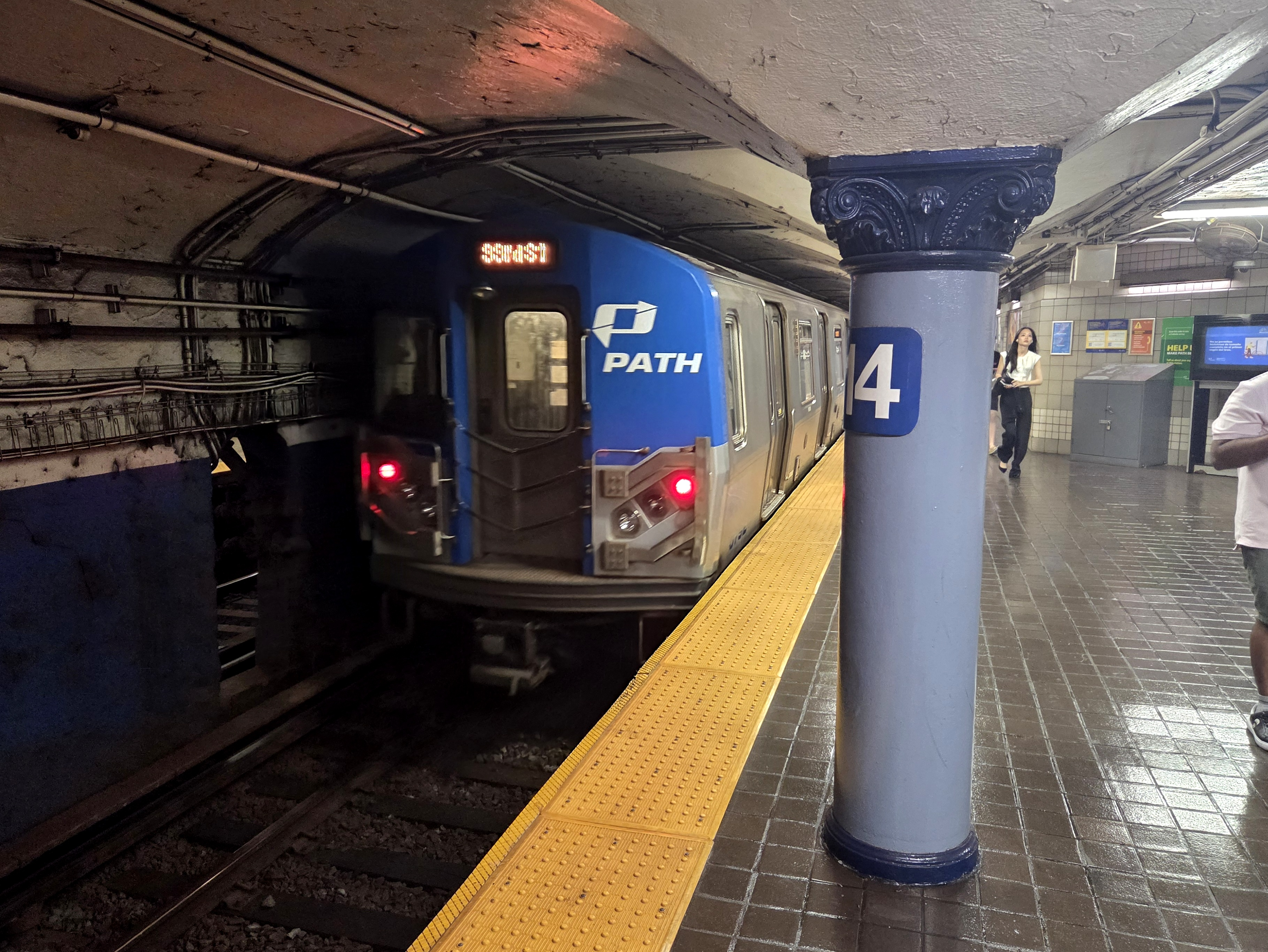
- A northbound train leaving the station in 2025

General information
- Location: 14th Street and Sixth Avenue; Manhattan, New York
- Coordinates: 40.737393°N 73.996862°W
- Owner: Port Authority of New York and New Jersey
- Line: Uptown Hudson Tubes
- Platforms: 2 side platforms
- Tracks: 2
- Connections: New York City Subway: at 14th Street (7th Avenue); at 14th Street (6th Avenue); at Sixth Avenue; NYCT Bus: M7, M14 SBS, M55, SIM1C, SIM3C, SIM4C, SIM7, SIM9, SIM33C, X27, X28

Construction
- Structure type: Underground
- Accessible: No

History
- Opened: February 25, 1908

Passengers
- 2025: 1,955,469 ▲8.3%
- Rank: 11 of 13

Services
Preceding station	PATH	Following station
Ninth Street toward Hoboken	HOB–33	23rd Street toward 33rd Street
Ninth Street toward Journal Square	JSQ–33	23rd Street toward 33rd Street
Late-nights
Ninth Street toward Journal Square	JSQ–33 (via HOB)	23rd Street toward 33rd Street
Former services
Preceding station	Hudson and Manhattan Railroad	Following station
Ninth Street toward Summit Avenue	Summit Avenue–33rd Street	19th Street toward Hudson Terminal
Track layout
Location

14th Street station is a station on the PATH system. Located at the intersection of 14th Street and Sixth Avenue (Avenue of the Americas) in the Chelsea neighborhood of Manhattan, New York City, it is served by the Hoboken–33rd Street and Journal Square–33rd Street lines during the daytime, and by the Journal Square–33rd Street (via Hoboken) line during late nights and weekend mornings.

== History ==
The original station, opened on February 25, 1908, was modified slightly as a result of the building of the Sixth Avenue Line. The platforms were extended to the south, and the northern ends were closed. This allowed the downtown platform to share a street entrance with the downtown IND subway.

The southbound platform was renovated in 1986, with the station's platform closed from June 2–September 1. The next year, the station's platforms were lengthened.

== Station layout ==
This PATH station consists of two side platforms, which are not connected by a crossover or crossunder. The southbound platform shares a mezzanine area with the IND Sixth Avenue Line's station at 14th Street, which the PATH station is located in between, but the northbound platform exits directly to the street. The tracks of the PATH station are located above the Sixth Avenue Line's express tracks, which the tunnels for were dug using the "deep-bore" tunneling method in the mid-1960s, and are not visible from the platforms. The deep-bore tunnel's round shape becomes square below this station and at 23rd Street, where provisions exist for lower level platforms. There is no free transfer between either platform, nor to any of the other stations in the 14th Street/Sixth Avenue station complex.

== 19th Street station ==
North of the 14th Street station is the abandoned 19th Street station, which was the original northern terminus of the Hudson and Manhattan Railroad. It opened on February 25, 1908, and closed on August 1, 1954. It is now used for storing mechanical equipment and is still visible from trains travelling between 14th Street and 23rd Street.

== Subway connections ==
Direct New York City Subway connections include:

- 14th Street on the IND Sixth Avenue Line (F, <F>, and M trains)
- 14th Street on the IRT Broadway – Seventh Avenue Line (1, 2, and 3 trains) via a block-long passageway
- Sixth Avenue on the BMT Canarsie Line (L train)

Passengers traveling from New Jersey must exit to street level, enter a nearby subway entrance, and descend to a separate subway mezzanine in order to access the IND station complex.

The entrances for New Jersey-bound PATH commuters are on the southwest and northwest corners of 6th Avenue and 14th Street. The entrance for 33rd Street-bound PATH commuters is on the east side of 6th Avenue, midblock between 13th and 14th Streets. The New School and Union Square are nearby.
