= Uptown Hudson Tubes =

Rail tunnels in New York and New Jersey

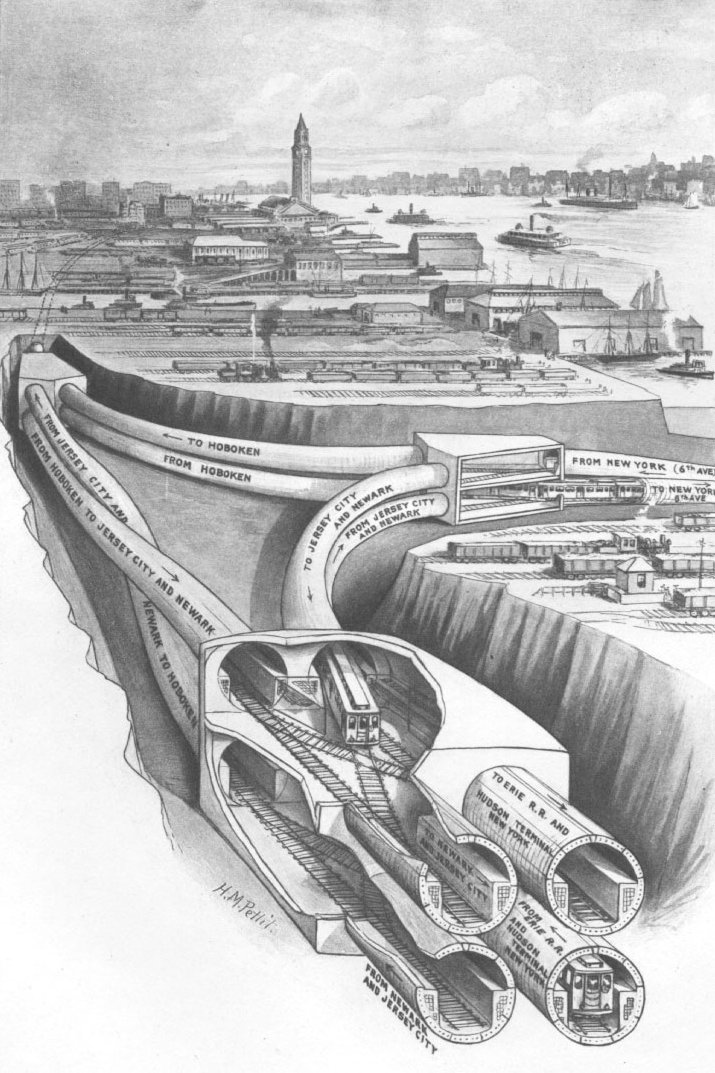
- Junction in Jersey City at tubes' west end from a 1909 illustration
- Interactive map of Uptown Hudson Tubes

Overview
- Location: Hudson River and Midtown Manhattan
- Coordinates: 40.7301°N 74.0205°W
- System: PATH
- Start: Christopher Street (underwater section); 33rd Street (full line)
- End: between Hoboken Terminal and Newport

Operation
- Constructed: 1874–1906
- Opened: February 26, 1908; 118 years ago
- Operator: Port Authority of New York and New Jersey
- Traffic: Railroad
- Character: Underground

Technical
- Design engineer: Charles M. Jacobs
- Length: 5,650 ft (1,722 m) underwater 3 mi (4.8 km) total
- No. of tracks: 2
- Track gauge: 4 ft 8 1/2 in (1,435 mm) standard gauge
- Electrified: Third rail, 600 V DC
- Tunnel clearance: 15.25 ft (4.65 m) diameter (southern tube); 18 ft (5.5 m) diameter (northern tube)
- Depth below water: 97 ft (29.57 m) below river level

The Uptown Hudson Tubes are a pair of tunnels that carry PATH trains between Manhattan, New York City, to the east and Hoboken, New Jersey, to the west. The tubes originate at a junction of two PATH lines on the New Jersey shore and cross eastward under the Hudson River. On the Manhattan side, the tubes run mostly underneath Christopher Street and Sixth Avenue, making four intermediate stops before terminating at 33rd Street station. The tubes do not enter Uptown Manhattan; the name reflects their location north of the Downtown Hudson Tubes that connect Jersey City and the World Trade Center.

Dewitt Clinton Haskin first attempted to construct the Uptown Hudson Tubes in 1873. Work was delayed by five years by a lawsuit, and was further disrupted by an 1880 accident that killed twenty workers. The project was canceled in 1883 due to a lack of money. A British company attempted to complete the tunnels in 1888, but also ran out of money by 1892, by which point the tunnels were nearly half-finished. In 1901, a company formed by William Gibbs McAdoo resumed work on the tubes, and by 1907, the tunnels were fully bored. The Uptown Hudson Tubes opened to passenger service in 1908 as part of the Hudson & Manhattan Railroad (H&M) and were completed by 1910.

After the Uptown Hudson Tubes' opening, the H&M proposed extending them northward to Grand Central Terminal, as well as creating a crosstown spur line that would run under Ninth Street in Manhattan. However, neither extension was ultimately constructed. In the 1930s, parts of the tubes under Sixth Avenue were rebuilt due to the construction of the Independent Subway System (IND)'s Sixth Avenue Line. The Uptown Hudson Tubes contained seven original stations; two stations at 19th and 28th streets were later closed and the 33rd Street terminal was rebuilt. The Port Authority of New York and New Jersey took over the H&M and the tunnels in 1962, rebranding the H&M as part of the PATH system. The Hoboken–33rd Street and Journal Square–33rd Street services operate through the tubes on weekdays, while the Journal Square–33rd Street (via Hoboken) service operates on weekends, nights, and holidays.

== Description ==
=== Route ===
The Uptown Hudson Tubes travel roughly east–west beneath the Hudson River, connecting Manhattan in the east and Hoboken and Jersey City in the west.

On the Manhattan side, the tunnels initially run eastward under Morton Street. At Greenwich Street, the tubes curve sharply north for two blocks, then turn sharply east below Christopher Street. The curve, which follows the streets above it, was made to avoid demolishing basements during construction.

The tubes do not enter Upper Manhattan; their name reflects their location north of the Downtown Hudson Tubes that connect Jersey City and the World Trade Center. As well, they were built when today's Midtown Manhattan was considered "uptown" and the true northernmost reaches of the island were not as densely developed. The name "Uptown Hudson Tubes" also applies to the section of the subway under Christopher Street and Sixth Avenue in Manhattan.

The first PATH stop in New York is at the Christopher Street station; service continues uptown to the 33rd Street terminal, making intermediate stops at 9th, 14th and 23rd streets. Two stations formerly existed at 19th and 28th streets. The ornately designed stations in Manhattan featured straight platforms, each 370 feet (110 m) long and able to accommodate 8-car consists. The stations underneath Sixth Avenue (14th, 19th, 23rd, and 28th streets, and the original 33rd Street Terminal) contain round columns with scrolls and the station name near the ceilings. The exposed steel rings of the tunnel's structure can be seen at Christopher and 9th streets.

On the Jersey City side, the tunnels leave the riverbank approximately parallel to 15th Street and enter a flying junction where trains can turn to Hoboken Terminal to the north or Erie Terminal (now the Newport station) to the south. The junction also allows trains to travel between Hoboken and Newport. Each end of the junction is within one of three double-deck concrete caissons. The Uptown Hudson Tubes enter caisson 1 at the eastern end of the junction, which carries trains to Hoboken or Newport on the upper level and trains from Hoboken or Newport on the lower level. Caisson 2 at the northern end carries trains to and from Hoboken, while caisson 3 at the southern end carries trains to and from Newport.

=== Dimensions ===
The Uptown Hudson Tubes measure 5,500 feet (1,700 m), or 5,650 feet (1,720 m) between shafts. The tubes descend as far as 97 feet (30 m) below mean river level. In both the uptown and downtown tubes, each track is located in its own tunnel. When a train passes through the tunnel, it pushes out the air in front of it towards the closest ventilation shaft. At the same time, it pulls air into the rail tunnel from the closest ventilation shaft behind it. This enables the piston effect, which results in better ventilation. On the Jersey City side, there is a construction shaft at 15th Street, measuring 30 by 65 feet (9.1 by 19.8 m) wide. When the tunnels were completed, the construction shaft was converted into a ventilation shaft. Additional ventilation shafts are located in Manhattan at Morton Street; Christopher and Greenwich streets; and Ninth Street and Sixth Avenue.

The diameter of the Uptown Tubes' southern tunnel is 15 feet 3 inches (4.65 m), while the more northerly tunnel is slightly larger with a diameter of 18 feet (5.5 m), because that tube had been constructed first. The tunnels are composed of built-up concentric steel rings measuring 2 feet (0.61 m) wide. On one side of each tube is a concrete bench wall, which measures 4 feet (1.2 m) high above the track bed. The bench walls contain ducts with wiring.

At Sixth Avenue and Christopher Street, the tunnels enter an arched cavern measuring 68 feet (21 m) wide, then curve north under Sixth Avenue. The cavern was built to accommodate a junction with a never-built spur extending eastward under Ninth Street. Shield tunneling was used only between the Uptown Hudson Tubes' western end in Jersey City and 12th Street in Manhattan. North of 12th Street, the circular tubes become two rectangular tunnels, which measure 14.5 feet (4.4 m) high by 13 feet (4.0 m) wide and carry one track each. Initial plans called for the 33rd Street station to be constructed as a four-track station, with two tracks for terminating trains and two tracks for trains running along an unbuilt northern extension of the line. As built, the 33rd Street station contained three tracks.

=== Service ===
PATH operates two services through the Uptown Tubes on weekdays: Hoboken–33rd Street and Journal Square–33rd Street. On late nights, weekends, and holidays, they are combined into the Journal Square–33rd Street (via Hoboken) service.

== Construction ==
=== Haskin attempt ===
Plans for a fixed crossing of the Hudson River date to the 1850s. No action was taken on the proposal until 1873, when engineer Dewitt Clinton Haskin formed the Hudson Tunnel Company to construct a tunnel under the Hudson River. The company was incorporated in New York on May 22 of that year and was incorporated in New Jersey four days later, on May 26; the companies initially had a $7 million capital stock authorization. Haskin intended for the tube to run from 15th Street in Jersey City to Morton Street in Manhattan, a distance of 5,400 feet (1,600 m). At the time, constructing a tunnel under the mile-wide river was considered less expensive than trying to build a bridge over it. Trenor W. Park was hired as the president of the new company. Haskin subsequently sought $10 million in funding to pay for the tunnel.

An initial attempt to construct the Hudson River tunnel began in November 1874 from the Jersey City side. Had this original tunnel effort been completed, it would have been 12,000 feet (3,700 m) long and consisted of a single tube 26 feet (7.9 m) wide by 24 feet (7.3 m) high. Trains from five railroad companies on the New Jersey side would have been hauled by special steam locomotives that would be able to emit very little steam. The engines would have continued through the tube to Manhattan, terminating at a railroad hub in Washington Square Park. This tunnel project was known as the Morton Street Tunnel. Work had progressed for only one month when it was stopped by a court injunction submitted by the Delaware, Lackawanna and Western Railroad, who owned the property at the tunnel's New Jersey portal. The construction shaft had been built to a depth of 20 feet (6.1 m) when work was paused. As a result of the lawsuit, work on the tunnel was delayed until September 1879, when the judge ruled in favor of the builders and the injunction was dissolved. The plans were also changed to a pair of tunnels 16 feet (4.9 m) wide by 18 feet (5.5 m) high.

The construction method used at the time did not employ a tunneling shield; rather, air compressors maintained pressure against the water-laden silt that was being tunneled through. Haskin believed the river silt was strong enough to maintain the tunnel's form—with the help of compressed air—until a 2-foot-6-inch-thick (76 cm) brick lining could be constructed. Haskin's plan was to excavate the tunnel, then fill it with compressed air to expel the water and to hold the iron plate lining in place. However, the amount of pressure needed to hold back the water at the bottom of the tube was much greater than the pressure needed to hold back the water at the top. On July 21, 1880, an overpressure blowout at the tube's top caused an accident that resulted in an air lock jam, trapping several workers and killing 20. It took six months to retrieve the corpses of the workers. A memorial for one of the workers killed was later erected in Jersey City.

The tunnel's construction was taken over by a new company called the Hudson River Tunnel Company in March 1881. This company drove a shaft on Morton Street in Manhattan and extended the tunnel from the Jersey City side. The liabilities incurred as a result of the 1880 accident halted tunneling work on November 5, 1882, due to insufficient funds. At that time, water was allowed to fill the unfinished tunnel. On March 20, 1883, the air compressors were turned back on and the tunnel was drained with the resumption of work. This continued for the next four months until July 20, 1883, when it was stopped once again due to a lack of funds. By that time, about 1,500 feet (460 m) of the northern tube and about 600 feet (180 m) of the southern tube had been constructed.

=== British attempt ===
In 1888, an unnamed British company attempted to finish the Morton Street Tunnel; it employed James Henry Greathead as a consulting engineer and S. Pearson & Son as principal contractors. S. Pearson & Son subsequently acquired the project's construction contract from Haskin's company. The unnamed British company advertised bonds in England in 1889 to raise money for construction. Following another blowout in 1890, the company turned to shield tunneling. The firm used a new device developed by Greathead, a pneumatic shield called the "Greathead Shield", to extend the tunnel by 1,600 feet (490 m). (Note: The shield simultaneously supported the tunnel walls and applied pneumatic pressure to the rock in front of it.) With a concentration of rock directly underneath the clay riverbed, the tube was aligned to pass directly above it, with very little clearance. To maintain sufficient air pressure inside, S. Pearson & Son decided to place a silt layer of at least 15 feet (4.6 m) above the tube. The silt layer was then removed after the tubes were finished, allowing each tube to maintain its own air pressure.

S. Pearson & Son were unable to finish the tubes because they had also run out of funds by 1891. Work stopped completely in 1892 after the company had completed another 2,000 feet (610 m) of digging. By this point, the pair of tubes had been dug from both sides of the river. The northern tube extended 4,000 feet (1,200 m) from the New Jersey shore and 150 feet (46 m) from the New York shore, with a gap of 1,500 feet (460 m) between the two ends of the tube. The southern tube had only been excavated 1,000 feet (300 m) from the New Jersey shore and 300 feet (91 m) from the New York shore. The construction company was foreclosed upon during 1898, and the bondholders took possession of the tunnel.

=== McAdoo attempt ===
In 1901, lawyer and future statesman William Gibbs McAdoo casually mentioned the idea of a Hudson River tunnel to a fellow lawyer, John Randolph Dos Passos, who had invested in the original tunneling project. From this conversation, McAdoo learned about the unfinished Morton Street Tunnel effort. He went on to explore it with Charles M. Jacobs, an engineer who helped build New York City's first underwater tunnel in 1894 under the East River, and who had also worked on the unfinished tunnel. McAdoo and consulting engineer J. Vipond Davies both believed that the existing work was still salvageable. McAdoo formed the New York and Jersey Tunnel Company in 1902, raising $8.5 million in capital stock for the company.

Unlike the North River Tunnels upstream, which would carry intercity and commuter trains when they opened in 1910, the Morton Street Tunnel was intended to carry only trolleys or rapid transit, which used smaller trains. This, in turn, allowed the Morton Street Tunnel to be smaller and less expensive. Originally, McAdoo only intended to complete the northern tube, which was further along in the construction process. Afterward, he would operate a narrow-gauge railway with two small carriages going back and forth within that single tube. However, amid worsening ferry congestion at Cortlandt Street Ferry Depot in Lower Manhattan, McAdoo ultimately devised a plan for a network of train lines connecting New Jersey and New York City. The Morton Street Tunnel became known as the Uptown Hudson Tubes, complementing a pair of downtown tunnels that McAdoo had planned to connect Jersey City with Lower Manhattan. The idea for the downtown tunnels was actually conceived by another company, the Hudson and Manhattan Railroad Corporation (H&M), in 1903, but McAdoo's New York and Jersey Railroad Company was interested in the H&M's plans as well.

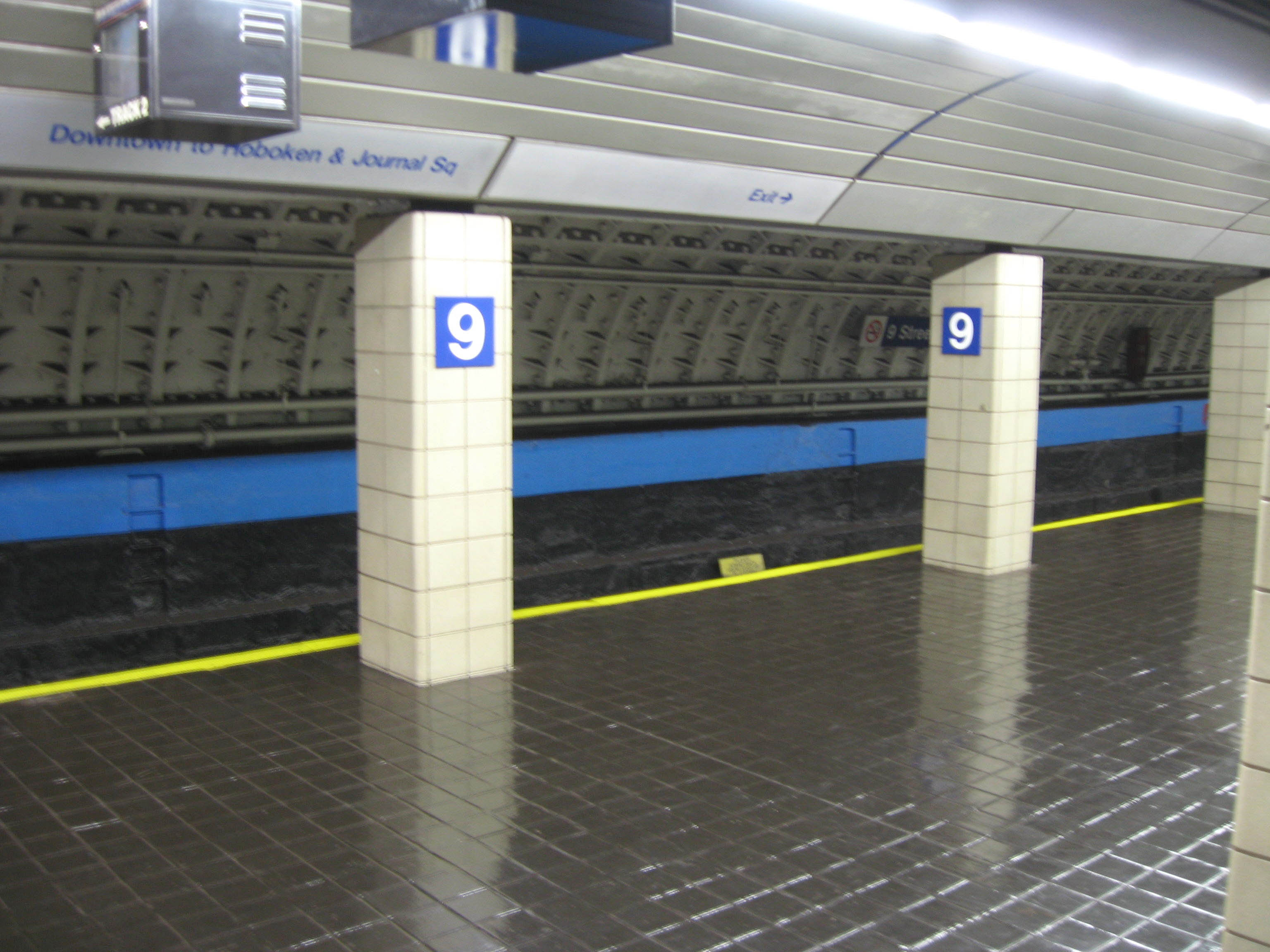
The exposed steel structure of the tubes at Ninth Street station

The new effort to complete the Uptown Hudson Tubes, led by chief engineer Charles M. Jacobs, employed a different method of tunneling using tubular cast iron plating and a tunneling shield at the excavation site. The large mechanically-jacked shield was pushed through the silt at the bottom of the river, and the silt went through the bulkhead of the shield, which faced the portion of the tunnel that had already been dug. The bulkhead contained a pressurized air lock in order to avoid sudden blowouts, such as had occurred during the original construction. The air pressure was maintained at 38 pounds per square inch (260 kPa). The excavated mud was then carted away to the surface using battery-operated electric locomotives running on a temporary narrow-gauge railway. In some cases, the silt would be baked with kerosene torches to facilitate easier removal of the mud. The cast iron lining would then be placed on the tunnel wall immediately after the shield had been pushed through, so that no silt could be seen on the tube wall behind the shield's bulkhead. These iron plates were then bolted shut to prevent leakages, as well as to maintain low air pressure in the tunnel. McAdoo later noted that the Uptown Hudson Tubes effort was the first project where machines, rather than workers, carted out the excess silt.

Because of the previous work on the Morton Street Tunnel, the tunnel project was already half complete a year after McAdoo's company started digging. By 1903, the gap was only a few feet wide between the two sections of the northern tube. As a result, the tubular cast iron and tunneling shield method was mostly used on the southern tube. For the southern tube, the tunneling shield progressed from the New Jersey side. Some difficulties arose during the completion of the northern tube. The company had to use dynamite to tunnel through a hard reef on the Manhattan side, which was only 1 to 16 feet (0.30 to 4.88 m) above the intended grade of the tunnel. In addition, an explosion killed one worker. The two parts of the northern tube were connected on March 11, 1904, accompanied by a large celebration that involved a group of 20 men walking through the completed tube from end to end.

=== Completion and franchise ===
By the end of 1904, the New York and Jersey Railroad Company had received permission from the New York City Board of Rapid Transit Commissioners to build a new subway line through Midtown Manhattan, which would connect with the Uptown Hudson Tubes; the company received the sole rights to operate this line for a duration of 25 years. The Midtown Manhattan line would travel eastward under Christopher Street before turning northeastward under Sixth Avenue, then continue underneath Sixth Avenue to a terminus at 33rd Street. The New York City Board of Aldermen expressed that the line could be extended further north to Central Park in the future. The New York and Jersey Railroad had previously submitted a bid for a Sixth Avenue subway line, but it was refused because Sixth Avenue was a major north–south road. The Rapid Transit Board changed its decision after Sixth Avenue property owners expressed opposition to the rejection.

McAdoo's company was also given perpetual rights to build and operate an east–west crosstown line under Christopher Street and Ninth Street eastward to either Second Avenue or Astor Place, with no intermediate stops. The Ninth Street tunnel would be constructed only after the completion of the other lines. The crosstown line was only excavated about 250 feet (76 m); the partly completed crosstown tube still exists. In January 1905, the Hudson Companies was incorporated for the purpose of completing the Uptown Hudson Tubes and constructing the Sixth Avenue line. The company, which was contracted to construct the Uptown Hudson Tubes' subway tunnel connections on each side of the river, had a capital of $21 million to complete the project.

The Hudson and Manhattan Railroad Company (H&M) was incorporated in December 1906 to operate a passenger railroad system between New York and New Jersey via the Uptown and Downtown Hudson Tubes. The Downtown Hudson Tubes, located about 1.25 miles (2.01 km) south of the first pair, had started construction by that point, and would ultimately open in July 1909. Digging for the Uptown Hudson Tubes was completed in 1907, after 33 years of intermittent effort; they were celebrated as the first non-waterborne link between Manhattan and New Jersey. Work continued to finish off the interior of the tubes. The finishing touches included the addition of a concrete lining, which replaced the original brick lining, as well as laying tracks and electric third rails; this took an additional year to complete. The stations on the Manhattan side were also completed during this time. Test runs of trains without passengers started through the tunnels in late 1907; the Hudson Companies tested its rolling stock on the Second Avenue Elevated, then delivered the trains to the Uptown Hudson Tubes for further testing.

== Operation ==
=== Service begins ===
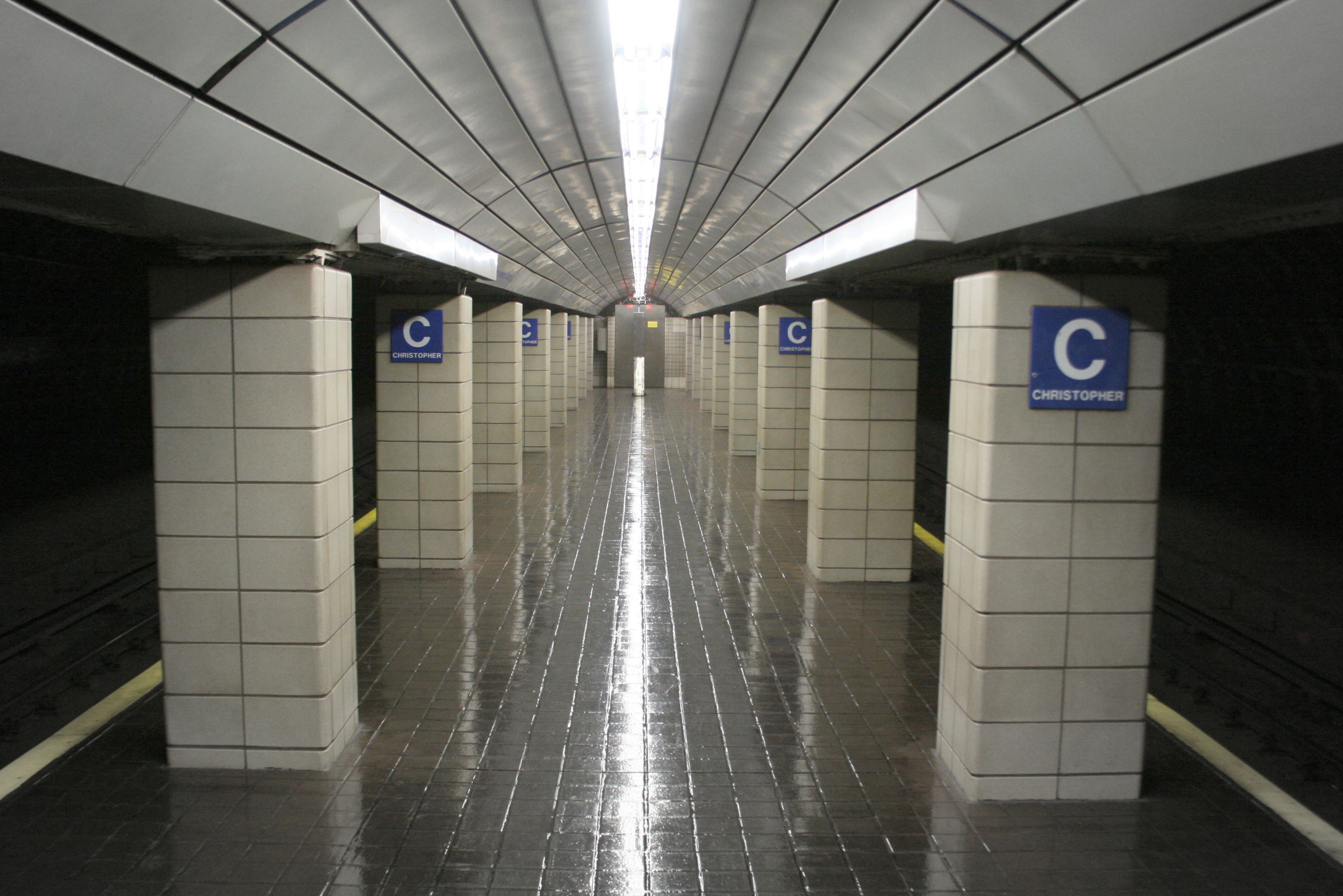
The Christopher Street station, the first station along the Uptown Hudson Tubes after they enter Manhattan

A trial run, carrying a party of officials, dignitaries, and news reporters, ran on February 15, 1908. The first "official" passenger train, which was also open only to officials and dignitaries, left 19th Street on February 25, 1908, at 3:40 p.m., and arrived at Hoboken Terminal ten minutes later. The tubes opened to the general public at midnight the next day, at which point the tubes had taken more than three decades to construct. At the time, three more stations at 23rd Street, 28th Street, and 33rd Street were under construction, and there were plans to extend the H&M line northeast to Grand Central Terminal, at Park Avenue and 42nd Street.

In the coming years, many businesses moved to Sixth Avenue, along the route of the Uptown Hudson Tubes, while commuters moved to New Jersey to take advantage of the 10-minute commute to Manhattan. New office buildings were also developed around Hoboken Terminal. The 23rd Street station opened on June 15, 1908. Trains to 23rd Street initially used the eastern tube between 19th and 23rd Streets. The western tube opened on November 10, 1910, and the extension to 33rd Street also opened at that time. H&M officials celebrated the completion of the line to 33rd Street with a luncheon at the Hotel Martinique at Herald Square.

On July 19, 1909, service via the downtown tubes commenced between Hudson Terminal in Lower Manhattan and Exchange Place in Jersey City. By this time, the Interborough Rapid Transit Company (IRT) had become a viable competitor, with a proposal to connect its Lexington Avenue line to the H&M at three locations: Fulton Street, Astor Place, and Grand Central–42nd Street. The Sixth Avenue portion of the H&M line also competed with the IRT's Sixth Avenue elevated, which extended both north of 33rd Street and south of 9th Street. Passengers along the uptown branch initially paid a flat fare of 5 cents. In 1911, H&M officials voted to raise fares to 7 cents for passengers traveling between the uptown branch and New Jersey. Passengers traveling between any two stations on the uptown branch, as well as passengers heading to Hudson Terminal, continued to pay 5 cents. In 1920, the fare between New Jersey and the uptown branch was raised to 10 cents, while passengers heading to Hudson Terminal paid 6 cents.

==== Proposed Grand Central extension ====
The original plans for the Uptown Hudson Tubes called for a terminal at 33rd Street under the Gimbels department store, now Manhattan Mall. During construction, the plan was changed so the 33rd Street station was directly under Sixth Avenue, providing for a future northward extension. This northward extension, which McAdoo had proposed by 1910, called for the Uptown Hudson Tubes to run under Sixth Avenue to 42nd Street, where they would curve east under the IRT's 42nd Street Line and terminate at Park Avenue. This would have created an easy connection to Grand Central Terminal, which was under construction at the time. There would be two intermediate stops at 39th Street/Sixth Avenue and 42nd Street/Fifth Avenue.

The proposed extension to Grand Central soon encountered problems. At Grand Central, the H&M platforms would be directly below the 42nd Street Line's platforms, but above the IRT's Steinway Tunnel that carried the Flushing Line to Queens. However, the IRT had constructed an unauthorized ventilation shaft between the 42nd Street line and the Steinway Tunnel; this would force the H&M to build its station at a very low depth, making it relatively harder for passengers to access the H&M station. As an alternative, the city's Utilities Board proposed connecting the Uptown Hudson Tubes to the Steinway Tunnel.

A franchise to extend the Uptown Hudson Tubes to Grand Central was awarded in June 1909, with the expectation that construction would start within six months and that the extension would be operational by January 1911. However, by February 1910, financing had only been secured to complete the 33rd Street terminal, and not for the Grand Central extension. By 1914, the H&M had not started construction of the Grand Central extension, and it requested to delay the start of construction for at least two more months. The Rapid Transit Commissioners had determined that the Ninth Street crosstown spur was unlikely to be built soon, so permission to build the Ninth Street tunnel was denied. By 1920, the H&M had submitted seventeen applications in which they sought to delay construction of the extension to Grand Central; in all seventeen instances, the H&M claimed that it was not an appropriate time to construct the tube. On its seventeenth application, the Rapid Transit Commissioners declined the request for a delay, effectively ending the H&M's right to build an extension to Grand Central.

=== Reconfiguration underneath Sixth Avenue ===
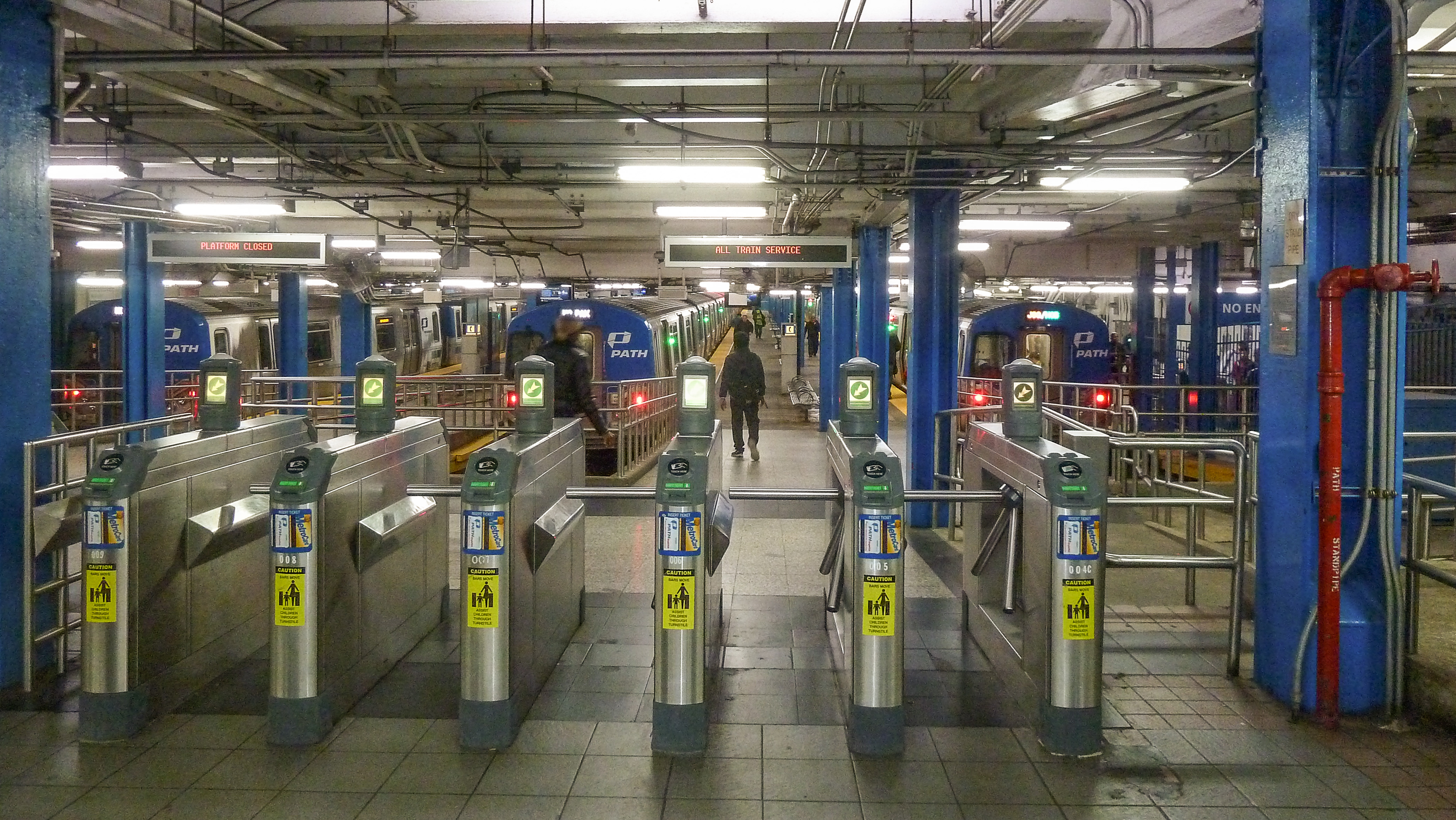
Reconstructed 33rd Street terminal

In 1924, the city-operated Independent Subway System (IND) submitted its list of proposed subway routes to the New York City Board of Transportation. One of the proposed routes, the Sixth Avenue Line, ran parallel to the Uptown Hudson Tubes from Ninth to 33rd streets. At first, the city intended to take over the portion of the Uptown Hudson Tubes under Sixth Avenue for IND use, then build a pair of new tunnels for the H&M directly underneath it. With the IND committed to building the Sixth Avenue line, and the H&M's 33rd Street terminal located both above and below preexisting railroad tunnels, the IND preferred to acquire the tubes. However, the H&M objected, and negotiations between the city, IND, and H&M continued until 1929.

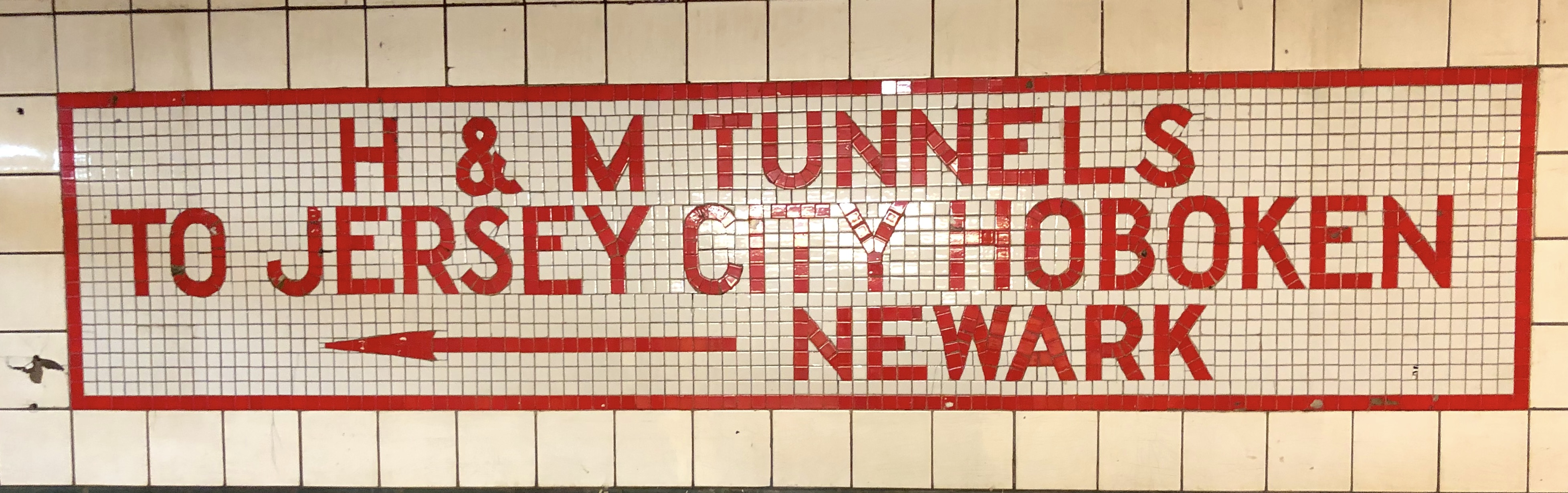
Historic tile work at current 14th street PATH station

The IND and H&M finally came to an agreement in 1930. The city had decided to build the IND Sixth Avenue Line's local tracks around the pre-existing H&M tubes, and add express tracks for the IND underneath the H&M tubes at a later date. However, the city still planned to eventually take over the H&M tracks, convert them to express tracks for the IND line, then build a lower level for the H&M. As part of the construction of the IND line, the H&M's 14th Street and 23rd Street stations had to be rebuilt to provide space for the IND's 14th Street and 23rd Street stations, which would be located at a similar elevation. The 19th Street station was not affected because the IND tracks were located below the H&M tracks at that point.

The 33rd Street terminal closed on December 26, 1937, and service on the H&M was cut back to 28th Street to allow for construction on the subway to take place. A temporary 29th Street entrance was installed at the 28th Street station. The 33rd Street terminal was moved south to 32nd Street and reopened on September 24, 1939. The city paid $800,000 to build the new 33rd Street station and reimbursed H&M another $300,000 for the loss of revenue. The 28th Street station was subsequently closed because the southern entrances to the 33rd Street terminal were located only two blocks away, rendering the 28th Street stop unnecessary. It was demolished to make room for the IND tracks below. The IND line opened in December 1940; it replaced the Sixth Avenue elevated, which was closed in December 1938 and demolished soon after.

=== Later years ===
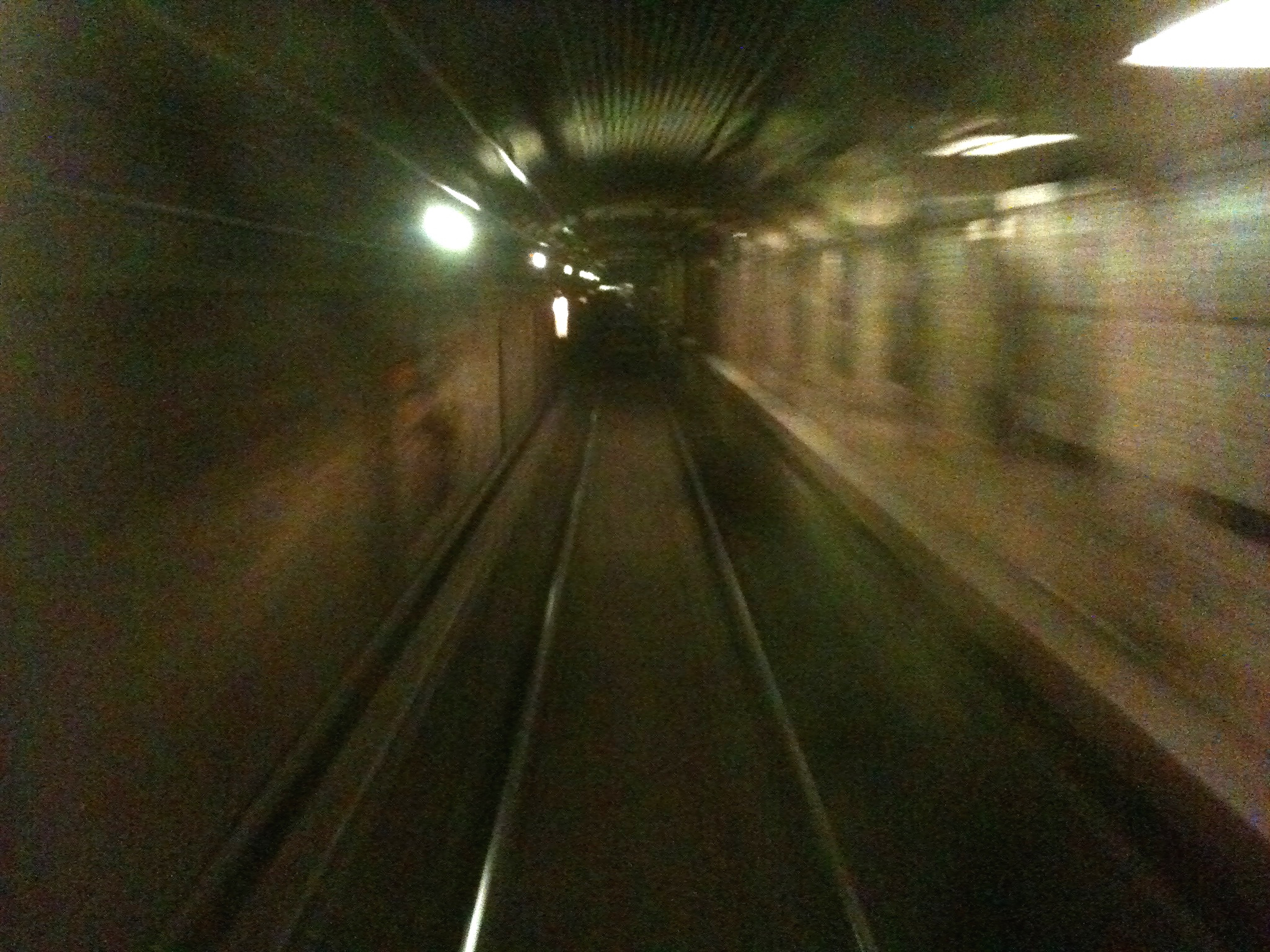
The remnants of the abandoned 19th Street station

The 19th Street station was closed in 1954. The only entrance to the station's westbound platform had been located inside a building, whose owner canceled the lease for the station entrance. The H&M determined that constructing a new entrance would be too expensive given the proximity of the 14th Street station. In 1962, the Port Authority of New York and New Jersey took over the H&M's operations, and the H&M system was rebranded as the PATH.

In 1961, as part of the Chrystie Street Connection and DeKalb Avenue Junction projects, the city began building a pair of express tracks for the IND Sixth Avenue Line. Although the tracks were located 80 feet (24 m) below ground level, they were directly underneath the portion of the Uptown Hudson Tubes that ran along Sixth Avenue; their ceilings located just 38 feet (12 m) beneath the bottom of the tubes. Service on the Uptown Hudson Tubes was suspended for five days in 1962 when it was discovered that builders constructing the express tunnels had drilled to an "unsafe" margin of 18 feet (5.5 m) underneath. The express tracks opened in 1967.

In 1986, the New Jersey-bound platform at 14th Street and both platforms of Christopher Street were closed for three months for renovations. Due to positive train control installation on the Uptown Hudson Tubes, service through the tubes was mostly suspended on weekends from July to October 2018.

== Awards ==
The Uptown and Downtown Hudson Tubes were declared a National Historic Civil Engineering Landmark in 1978 by the American Society of Civil Engineers. Additionally, the coal-fired Hudson and Manhattan Railroad Powerhouse, which generated electricity to run the Hudson tube trains, was built in 1906–1908. The powerhouse stopped generating in 1929, and was added to the National Register of Historic Places on November 23, 2001.

== See also ==
- Hudson and Manhattan Railroad Powerhouse
- List of bridges, tunnels, and cuts in Hudson County, New Jersey
- North River Tunnels (Pennsylvania Railroad)
- Timeline of Jersey City area railroads
