= Journal Square–33rd Street (via Hoboken) =

Rapid transit service in New Jersey and New York City

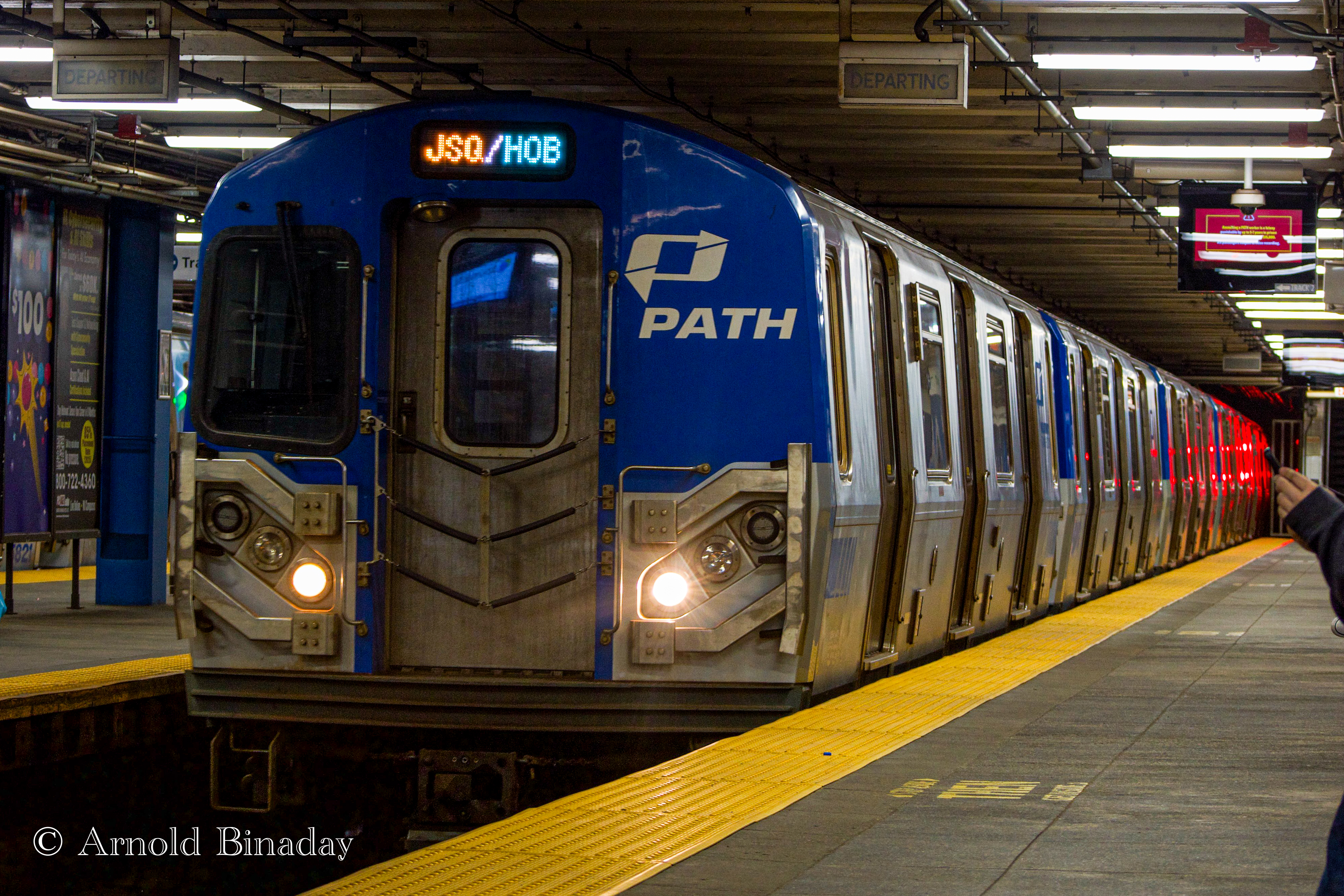
- JSQ-33rd St (via HOB) Line at 33rd Street

Overview
- Status: Operates 11 p.m. to 6 a.m. weekdays and 9 p.m. to 10 a.m. weekends
- Owner: Port Authority of New York and New Jersey
- Locale: Hudson County, New Jersey and Manhattan, New York
- Termini: Journal Square; 33rd Street
- Stations: 9

Service
- Type: Rapid transit
- System: PATH
- Rolling stock: PA5

History
- Opened: 2001

Technical
- Line length: 6.7 miles (10.8 km)
- Character: Surface and underground
- Track gauge: 4 ft 8 1/2 in (1,435 mm) standard gauge
- Electrification: Third rail, 600 V DC
- Operating speed: 55 mph (89 km/h)

Journal Square–33rd Street (via Hoboken) (JSQ-33 via HOB) is a rapid transit service operated by the Port Authority Trans-Hudson (PATH) railroad. It is colored yellow and blue on the PATH service map, and trains on this service display both yellow and blue marker lights. This service operates from Journal Square in Jersey City, New Jersey by way of the Uptown Hudson Tubes to 33rd Street in Midtown Manhattan, New York, with trains reversing direction mid-route at Hoboken Terminal. The 6.7-mile (10.8 km) trip takes 26 minutes to complete.

== Operation ==
This service operates from 11 p.m. to 6 a.m. on weekdays and 9 p.m. to 10 a.m. on weekends. It combines PATH's two services to midtown Manhattan, Journal Square–33rd Street and Hoboken–33rd Street, into one during these late-night hours. The Hoboken–World Trade Center service does not operate during the late-night hours. Passengers wishing to travel from Hoboken to World Trade Center at these times must take the southbound Journal Square–33rd Street via Hoboken train from Hoboken and transfer at Grove Street to the northbound Newark–World Trade Center train.

== History ==
The service originated shortly after the September 11 attacks, which destroyed the World Trade Center station. All service to lower Manhattan was suspended indefinitely, with two services operating via the Uptown Tubes, Newark-33rd Street and Hoboken-33rd Street. During overnight hours, all service was provided by the Newark–33rd Street (via Hoboken) branch until Exchange Place reopened on June 29, 2003. At that time, the NWK–33 (via HOB) service was truncated to Journal Square and assumed its current name, running on weekends as well.

The Hoboken station suffered severe damage from Hurricane Sandy, which devastated the PATH system in late October 2012. As a result, the station was closed for repairs caused by damage to trainsets, mud, rusted tracks, and destroyed critical electrical equipment after approximately 8 feet (2.4 m) of water submerged the tunnels in and around the station. Due to the lengthy amount of time that was necessary to complete the repairs, service on the line was temporarily suspended. On December 19, 2012, the Hoboken station was reopened after repairs were completed, but the line did not resume service until early 2013 due to repairs in other areas of the PATH system.

Because of positive train control installation on the Uptown Hudson Tubes, the Journal Square–33rd Street via Hoboken service was mostly suspended on weekends from July to October 2018. Since all stations between Christopher and 33rd Streets were closed during the weekends, the service was replaced by the Journal Square–World Trade Center (via Hoboken) service ( ) on Saturdays, and the Journal Square–Hoboken service ( ) on Sundays and early Monday mornings. Around weekends, the JSQ–33 (via HOB) would still see an hour of service on Friday nights and an hour on Monday mornings before reverting to the three weekday services.

In October 2024, the PANYNJ announced that the Hoboken Terminal PATH station would be closed for refurbishment for most of February 2025. During that time, the Journal Square–33rd Street (via Hoboken) route was suspended, and the Journal Square–33rd Street route operated 24 hours a day. Beginning on June 15, 2025, Journal Square bound trains added an additional stop to Exchange Place station on weekends through January 2026 due to track work.

In November 2025, the PANYNJ announced that the Journal Square–33rd Street (via Hoboken) route would run twice as frequently during weekend daytime hours, with headways reduced from 20 to 10 minutes, starting on March 15, 2026. Weekend daytime service would be replaced by the Journal Square–33rd Street and Hoboken–33rd Street routes starting on May 17, 2026, having the route only operate between 11 p.m. and 6 a.m. weekdays, and 9 p.m. and 10 a.m. weekends. Although the Journal Square–33rd Street (via Hoboken) route would continue to run at night, trains would run twice as frequently starting in May, with headways reduced from 40 to 20 minutes on Friday nights to Saturday morning.

== Station listing ==
Disabled access	Station	Connections
Journal Square	Jersey City, NJ	PATH: NWK-WTC; NJ Transit Bus
Grove Street	Jersey City, NJ	PATH: NWK-WTC; NJ Transit Bus
Newport	Jersey City, NJ	Hudson–Bergen Light Rail; NJT Bus, Academy Bus
Hoboken	Hoboken, NJ	NJ Transit Rail; Metro-North Railroad: ■ Port Jervis Line; Hudson–Bergen Light Rail; NJT Bus; NY Waterway
Christopher Street	New York, NY	PATH: HOB-33; NYC Subway: NYCT Bus
Ninth Street	New York, NY	PATH: HOB-33; NYC Subway: NYCT Bus
14th Street	New York, NY	PATH: HOB-33; NYC Subway: NYCT Bus
23rd Street	New York, NY	PATH: HOB-33; NYC Subway: NYCT Bus
33rd Street	New York, NY	PATH: HOB-33; NYC Subway: NYCT Bus
