= Hoboken–33rd Street =

Rapid transit service in New Jersey and New York City

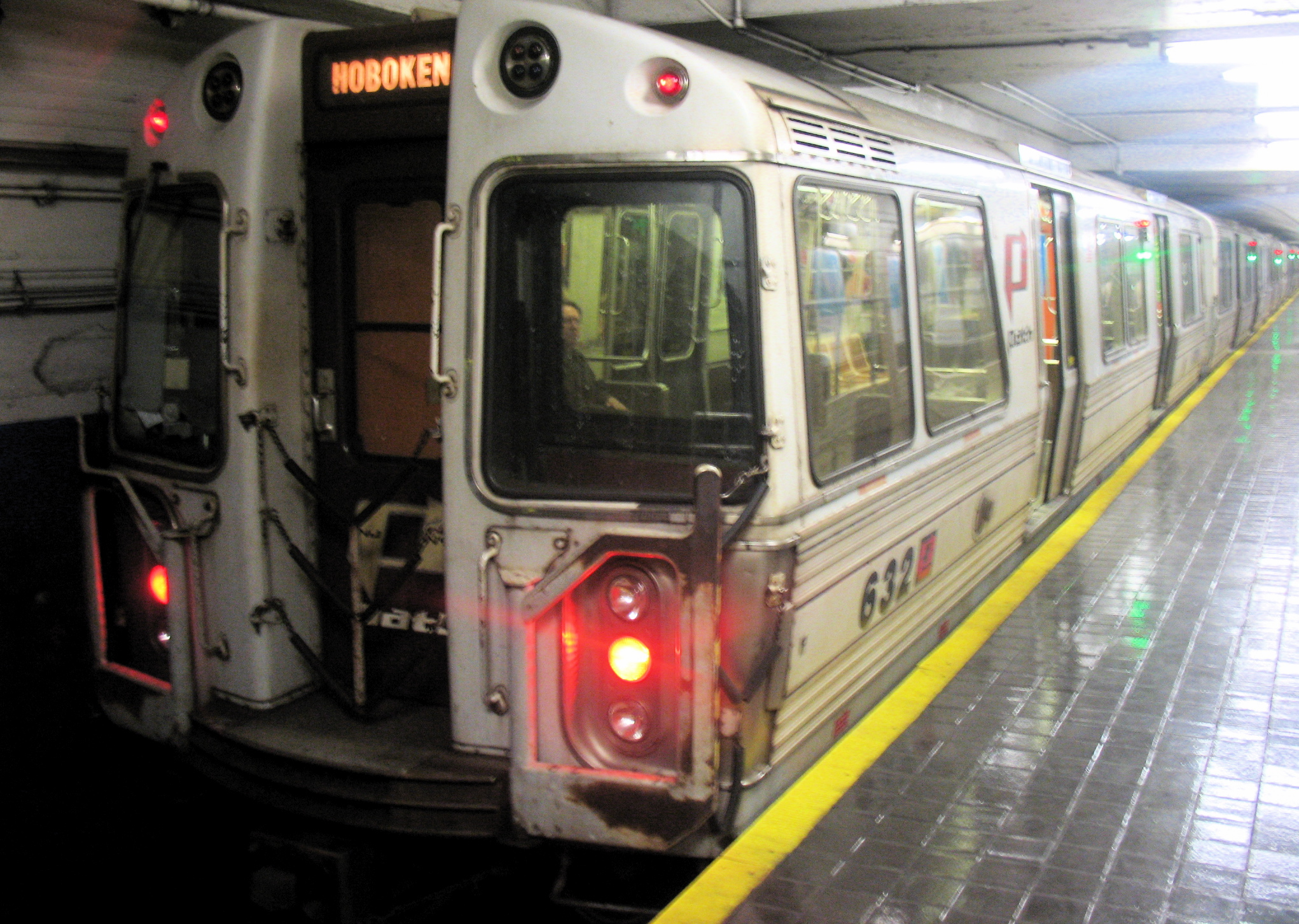
- Hoboken-bound car at the 14th Street station

Overview
- Status: Operates 6 a.m. to 11 p.m. weekdays and 10 a.m. to 9 p.m. weekends
- Owner: Port Authority of New York and New Jersey
- Locale: Hoboken, New Jersey and Manhattan, New York
- Termini: Hoboken; 33rd Street
- Stations: 6

Service
- Type: Rapid transit
- System: PATH
- Rolling stock: PA5

History
- Opened: February 25, 1908

Technical
- Line length: 3.5 miles (5.6 km)
- Character: Fully underground
- Track gauge: 4 ft 8 1/2 in (1,435 mm) standard gauge
- Electrification: Third rail, 600 V DC

Hoboken–33rd Street is a rapid transit service operated by the Port Authority Trans-Hudson (PATH). It is colored blue on the PATH service map and trains on this service display blue marker lights. This service operates from the Hoboken Terminal in Hoboken, New Jersey by way of the Uptown Hudson Tubes to 33rd Street in Midtown Manhattan, New York. The 3.5-mile (5.6 km) trip takes 14 minutes to complete.

== History ==
The Hoboken-33rd Street service originated as the Hoboken–19th Street service operated by the Hudson and Manhattan Railroad (H&M) on February 26, 1908. The first of what would become the four lines of the H&M/PATH service, it operated from Hoboken Terminal and ran through the Uptown Hudson Tubes, but ran only as far north as 19th Street in Manhattan. An extension of the H&M from 19th Street to 23rd Street opened on June 15, 1908. The line was expanded to 33rd Street on November 10, 1910, with an intermediate station at 28th Street.

The 28th Street station was closed in September 1939 during the construction of the IND Sixth Avenue Line in Manhattan, and the 19th Street station was closed on August 1, 1954. The H&M itself was succeeded by Port Authority Trans-Hudson (PATH) in 1962.

After the September 11 attacks destroyed the World Trade Center station, service on the Hoboken–33rd Street line was suspended during overnight hours, with all service provided by the Newark–33rd Street via Hoboken branch. When the Exchange Place station reopened in June 2003, the Newark–33rd Street via Hoboken branch was truncated to Journal Square, but operated during weekends as well. It was renamed the Journal Square–33rd Street (via Hoboken) branch.

The Hoboken station suffered severe damage from Hurricane Sandy, which devastated the PATH system in late October 2012. As a result, the station was closed for repairs caused by damage to trainsets, mud, rusted tracks, and destroyed critical electrical equipment after approximately 8 ft (2.4 m) of water submerged the tunnels in and around the station. Due to the lengthy amount of time that was necessary to complete the repairs, service on the line was temporarily suspended. On December 19, 2012, the line resumed operations after the Hoboken station reopened.

In October 2024, the PANYNJ announced that the Hoboken Terminal PATH station would be closed for refurbishment for most of February 2025. During this time, the Hoboken–33rd Street route would be suspended and replaced with a temporary 33rd Street–World Trade Center route. Beginning in June 2025, the PANYNJ announced that the Hoboken–33rd Street route would operate on all weekends through January 2026 to provide additional service to the Journal Square–33rd Street (via Hoboken) route due to rail construction at Newport station, operating every 20 minutes between 10:00 am and 11:00 pm until ending in February 2026.

In November 2025, the PANYNJ announced that the Hoboken–33rd Street route would begin running on weekends between 10 a.m. and 9 p.m. every 10 minutes starting on May 17, 2026. The existing weekend service pattern would skip Hoboken on weekends, becoming the Journal Square–33rd Street route; this would effectively split the Journal Square–33rd Street (via Hoboken) line into two routes.

== Station listing ==
Station	Location	Connections
Hoboken	Hoboken, NJ	PATH: HOB-WTC; NJ Transit Rail; Metro-North Railroad: ■ Port Jervis Line; Hudson–Bergen Light Rail; NJT Bus; NY Waterway
Christopher Street	New York, NY	PATH: JSQ-33; NYC Subway: NYCT Bus
Ninth Street	New York, NY	PATH: JSQ-33; NYC Subway: NYCT Bus
14th Street	New York, NY	PATH: JSQ-33; NYC Subway: NYCT Bus
23rd Street	New York, NY	PATH: JSQ-33; NYC Subway: NYCT Bus
33rd Street	New York, NY	PATH: JSQ-33; NYC Subway: NYCT Bus
