= 33rd Street station (PATH) =

Port Authority Trans-Hudson rail station

33rd Street
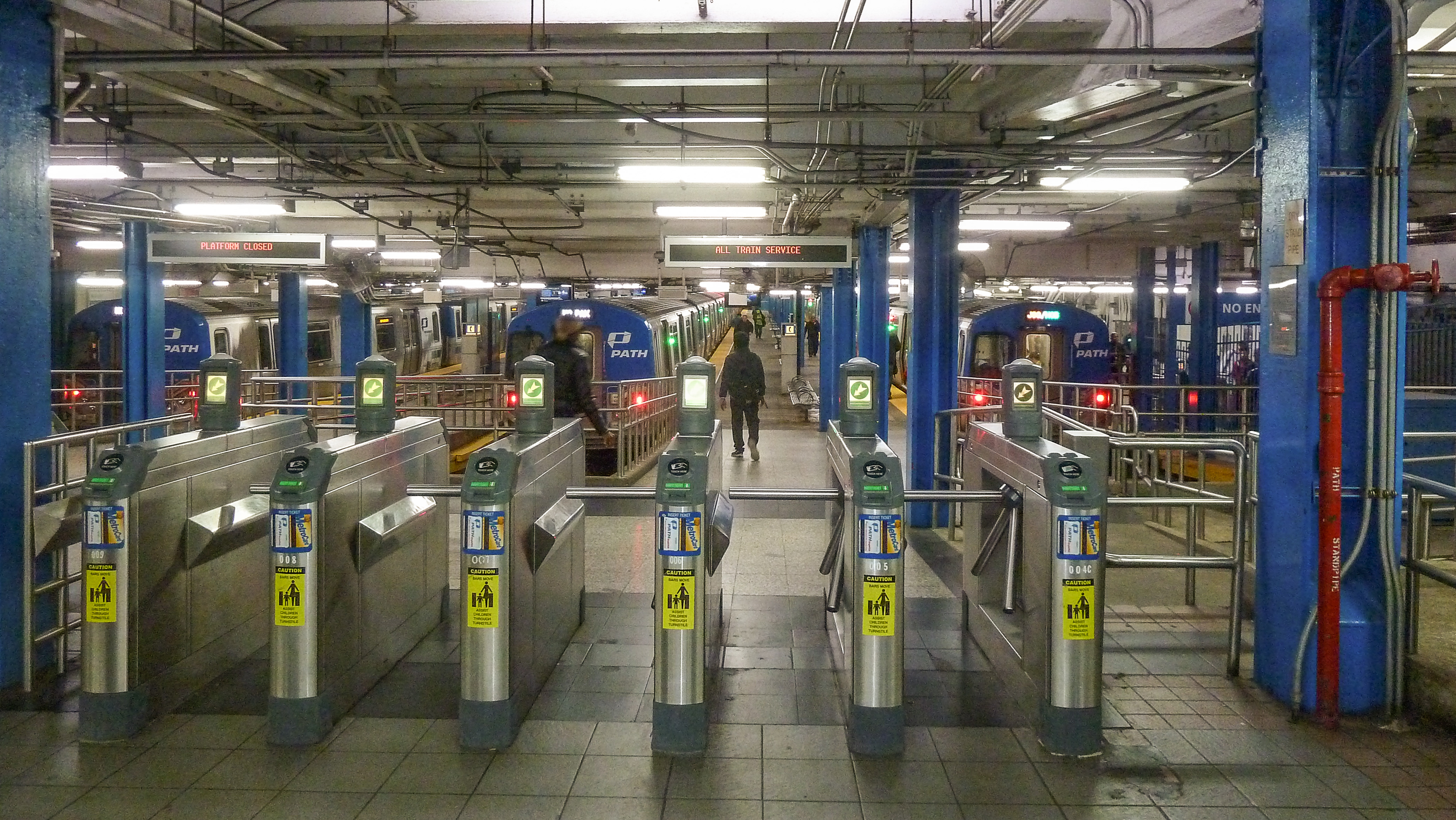
- 33rd Street station turnstiles

General information
- Location: 33rd Street and Sixth Avenue; Manhattan, New York
- Coordinates: 40.749111°N 73.988240°W
- Owner: Port Authority of New York and New Jersey
- Line: Uptown Hudson Tubes
- Platforms: 2 side platforms, 2 island platforms
- Tracks: 3
- Connections: New York City Subway: at 34th Street–Herald Square; at 34th Street–Penn Station; at 34th Street–Penn Station; NYCT Bus: M7, M20, M34 SBS, M34A SBS, SIM23, SIM24, Q32; MTA Bus: BxM2; Amtrak, LIRR, NJT Rail (at Penn Station)

Construction
- Structure type: Underground
- Accessible: Yes (passageway to subway station not accessible)

History
- Opened: November 10, 1910
- Rebuilt: 1939

Passengers
- 2025: 6,910,396 ▲2.8%
- Rank: 3 of 13

Services
Preceding station	PATH	Following station
23rd Street toward Hoboken	HOB–33	Terminus
23rd Street toward Journal Square	JSQ–33	Terminus
Late-nights
23rd Street toward Journal Square	JSQ–33 (via HOB)	Terminus
Former services
Preceding station	Hudson and Manhattan Railroad	Following station
28th Street toward Summit Avenue	Summit Avenue–33rd Street	Terminus
Track layout
Location

33rd Street station is a terminal station on the PATH system. Located at the intersection of 32nd Street and Sixth Avenue (Avenue of the Americas) in the Herald Square neighborhood of Midtown Manhattan, New York City, it is served by the Hoboken–33rd Street and Journal Square–33rd Street lines during the daytime, and by the Journal Square–33rd Street (via Hoboken) line during late nights, weekend mornings, and holidays. 33rd Street serves as the northern terminus of all three lines.

== History ==
=== Opening ===
The 33rd Street station is part of the Uptown Hudson Tubes, built by the Hudson & Manhattan Railroad (H&M), the PATH's predecessor. The first section of the tubes opened in February 1908. The 33rd Street station opened on November 10, 1910, as part of the northern extension of the line. The original plans for the Uptown Hudson Tubes called for a terminal at 33rd Street under the Gimbels department store, now 100 West 33rd Street. During construction, the plan was changed so the 33rd Street station was directly under Sixth Avenue, providing for a future northward extension. The Gimbels store at the site opened in 1910, but the underlying plot was owned by an H&M subsidiary until 1919, when it was sold to Gimbels.

An extension of the tunnel to Grand Central Terminal and the Grand Central subway station was proposed in 1910. A franchise to extend the Uptown Hudson Tubes to Grand Central was awarded in June 1909. Work never started due to various delays. In addition, the Interborough Rapid Transit Company (IRT) constructed an unauthorized ventilation shaft between its 42nd Street Line and Steinway Tunnel in the space where the H&M terminus was planned to go. By 1920, the H&M had submitted seventeen applications in which they sought to delay construction of the extension to Grand Central; in all seventeen instances, the H&M claimed that it was not an appropriate time to construct the tube. On the H&M's seventeenth application, the Rapid Transit Commissioners declined the request for a delay, effectively ending the H&M's right to build an extension to Grand Central.

=== Relocation ===
In 1924, the city-operated Independent Subway System (IND) submitted its list of proposed subway routes to the New York City Board of Transportation. One of the proposed routes, the Sixth Avenue Line, ran parallel to the Uptown Hudson Tubes from Ninth to 33rd streets. Negotiations between the city, IND, and H&M continued until 1929. The IND and H&M finally came to an agreement in 1930. The city had decided to build the IND Sixth Avenue Line's local tracks around the pre-existing H&M tubes, and add express tracks for the IND underneath the H&M tubes at a later date.

The 33rd Street terminal closed on December 26, 1937, and service on the H&M was cut back to 28th Street to allow for construction on the subway to take place. A temporary 29th Street entrance was installed at the 28th Street station. The 33rd Street terminal was moved south to 32nd Street and reopened on September 24, 1939. The city paid $800,000 to build the new 33rd Street station and reimbursed H&M another $300,000 for the loss of revenue. As part of this upgrade, the 28th Street station was closed and demolished. As a partial compensation for the loss of the station, an entrance to the new terminal was opened at 30th Street. The IND line opened in December 1940.

=== Subsequent years ===
In 1962, the Port Authority of New York and New Jersey formally took over the H&M, rebranding the system as Port Authority Trans-Hudson (PATH). A "Gimbels passageway" was formerly used by pedestrians to connect to Penn Station a block to the west under 33rd Street. After years of safety and sanitation concerns, an epidemic of sexual assaults led to its closure in the 1980s.

A train-car wash formerly operated at track 1 of the 33rd Street terminal. It was replaced by a wash that opened in mid-September 1993 in Jersey City. It was computer-operated, and designed to reclean and recycle the water used. More space for the operation was provided at Jersey City, allowing the detergent used on the cars to have more time to take effect. At 33rd Street, brushes began scrubbing the cars very soon after the detergent went on. Its completion allowed the PANYNJ to deactivate the car wash at 33rd Street, providing more flexibility in terminal operations there.

PATH began testing out a new contactless payment system called TAPP, similar to the Metropolitan Transportation Authority's OMNY system, at 33rd Street and Journal Square in December 2023.

== Station layout ==
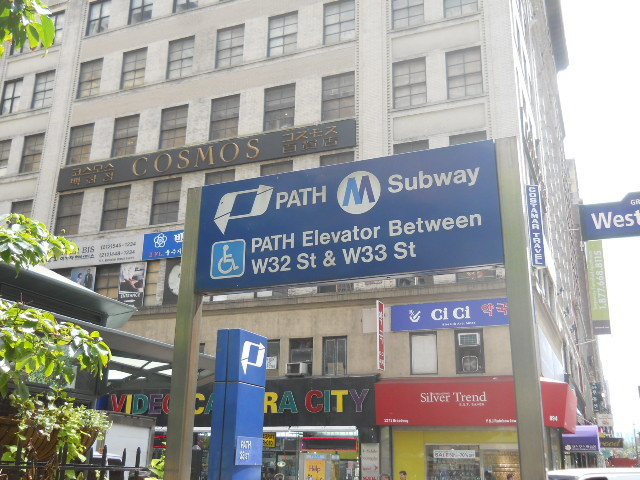
33rd Street station entrance

The present station has three tracks in a Spanish solution with two island platforms and two side platforms, located two stories below ground level. There is a small mezzanine with turnstiles, located above the platforms, at the south end of the station. The tracks end at bumper blocks at the north end of the station, where ramps from each platform lead up to the northern turnstile area, located about one and a half stories below ground level.

=== Exits ===
At the south end of the 33rd Street station are two staircases, one to either side of Sixth Avenue between 30th and 31st Streets. The northern end contains exits to the northwest and northeast corners of Sixth Avenue and 32nd Street, and an elevator on the west side of Sixth Avenue between 32nd and 33rd Streets. From the northern end of the station, there are also passageways to the connected New York City Subway station and its own exits.

33rd St to 34th St subway cross-section
11th Av	10th & 9th Avs are skipped	Farley Building & Moynihan Train Hall	8th Av	Madison Square; Garden	7th Av	Storefronts	6th Av & Broadway		5th & Madison Avs are skipped	Park Av
mezzanine	10th & 9th Avs are skipped	train hall	A/C/E	concourse	1/2/3	Former Gimbel's passageway	mezz	PATH	5th & Madison Avs are skipped	6/<6>
mezzanine	10th & 9th Avs are skipped	conc	mezzanine	concourse	mezzanine		N/Q/R/W		5th & Madison Avs are skipped
7/<7>	10th & 9th Avs are skipped	Penn Station (platform level)					B/D/F/<F>/M		5th & Madison Avs are skipped

== Nearby attractions ==
- Empire State Building
- Herald Square
- Koreatown
- Macy's
- Madison Square Garden
- Penn Station
- Manhattan Mall
