= PATH (rail system) =

Rapid transit system in the northeast US

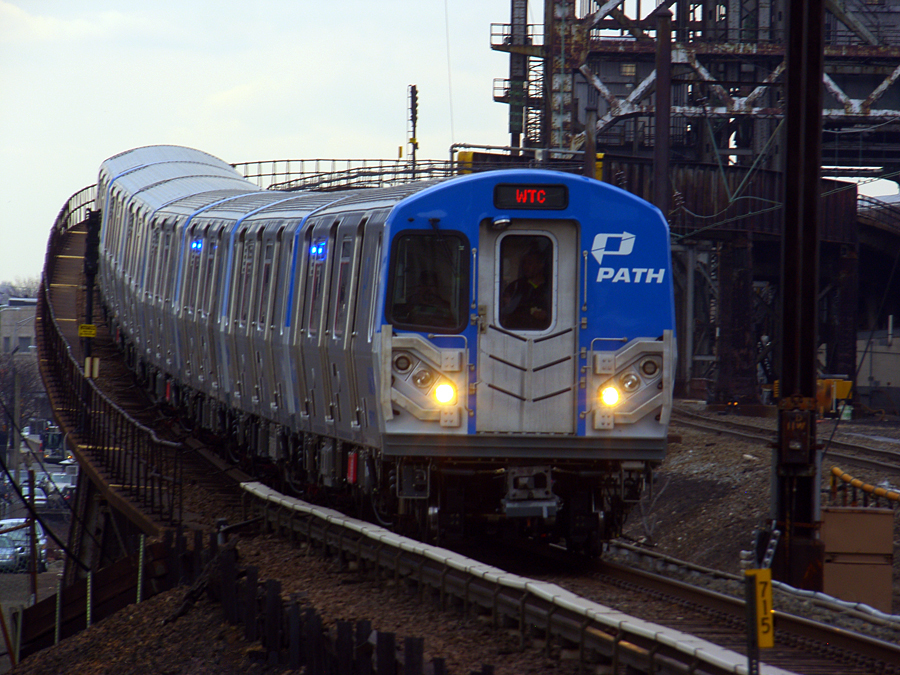
- A PATH train of PA5 cars on the Newark–World Trade Center line, crossing the Passaic River en route to the World Trade Center

Overview
- Owner: Port Authority of New York and New Jersey
- Locale: Newark/Hudson County, New Jersey and Manhattan, New York
- Transit type: Commuter railroad (de jure); Rapid transit (de facto)
- Number of lines: 4
- Number of stations: 13
- Daily ridership: 228,400 (weekdays, Q2 2026)
- Annual ridership: 64,318,300 (2025)
- Headquarters: PATH Plaza; Jersey City, New Jersey
- Website: panynj.gov/path

Operation
- Began operation: February 25, 1908; 118 years ago as H&M Railroad; September 1, 1962; 64 years ago as PATH
- Operator: Port Authority Trans-Hudson Corporation
- Number of vehicles: 350 PA5 cars

Technical
- System length: 13.8 mi (22.2 km)
- Track gauge: 4 ft 8 1/2 in (1,435 mm) standard gauge
- Electrification: Third rail, 600 V DC

The Port Authority Trans-Hudson (PATH) is a 13.8-mile (22.2 km) rapid transit system in the northeastern United States. It serves the northeastern New Jersey cities of Newark, Harrison, Jersey City, and Hoboken, as well as Lower and Midtown Manhattan in New York City. The PATH is operated as a wholly owned subsidiary of the Port Authority of New York and New Jersey. Trains run around the clock year-round; four routes serving 13 stations operate daily, while two routes operate during late nights. The PATH crosses the Hudson River through cast iron tunnels that rest on a bed of silt on the river bottom. It operates as a deep-level subway in Manhattan and the Jersey City and Hoboken riverfronts; from Grove Street in Jersey City to Newark, trains run in open cuts, at grade level, and on elevated track. In 2025, the system saw 64,318,300 rides, or about 228,400 per weekday in the second quarter of 2026, making it the fifth-busiest rapid transit system in the United States.

The routes of the PATH system were originally operated by the Hudson & Manhattan Railroad (H&M), built to link New Jersey's Hudson Waterfront with New York City. The system began operations in 1908 and was fully completed in 1911. Three stations have since closed; two others were relocated after a re-alignment of the western terminus. From the 1920s, the rise of automobile travel and the concurrent construction of bridges and tunnels across the river sent the H&M into a financial decline during the Great Depression, from which it never recovered, and it was forced into bankruptcy in 1954. As part of the deal that cleared the way for the construction of the original World Trade Center, the Port Authority bought the H&M out of receivership in 1962 and renamed it PATH. In the 2000s and 2010s, the system suffered longstanding interruptions from disasters that affected the New York metropolitan area, most notably the September 11 attacks and Hurricane Sandy. Both private and public stakeholders have proposed expanding PATH service in New Jersey, though none have been funded as of 2025.

Although PATH has operated as a rapid transit system since 1966, it is legally a commuter railroad under the jurisdiction of the Federal Railroad Administration (FRA). Its right-of-way between Jersey City and Newark is located in close proximity to Conrail, NJ Transit, and Amtrak trackage, and it shares the Dock Bridge with intercity and commuter trains. All PATH train operators must therefore be licensed railroad engineers, trains must have conductors on board, and extra inspections are required. Since 2011, PATH has used one class of rolling stock, the PA5.

== History ==
=== Hudson & Manhattan Railroad ===
The PATH system pre-dates the New York City Subway's first underground line, operated by the Interborough Rapid Transit Company. The Hudson & Manhattan Railroad (H&M) was planned in 1874, but it was not possible at that time to safely tunnel under the Hudson River. Construction began on the existing tunnels in 1890, but soon stopped when funding ran out. It resumed in 1900 under the direction of William Gibbs McAdoo, an ambitious young lawyer who had moved to New York from Chattanooga, Tennessee, and later became president of the H&M. The railroad became so closely associated with McAdoo that, in its early years, its lines were called the McAdoo Tubes or McAdoo Tunnels.

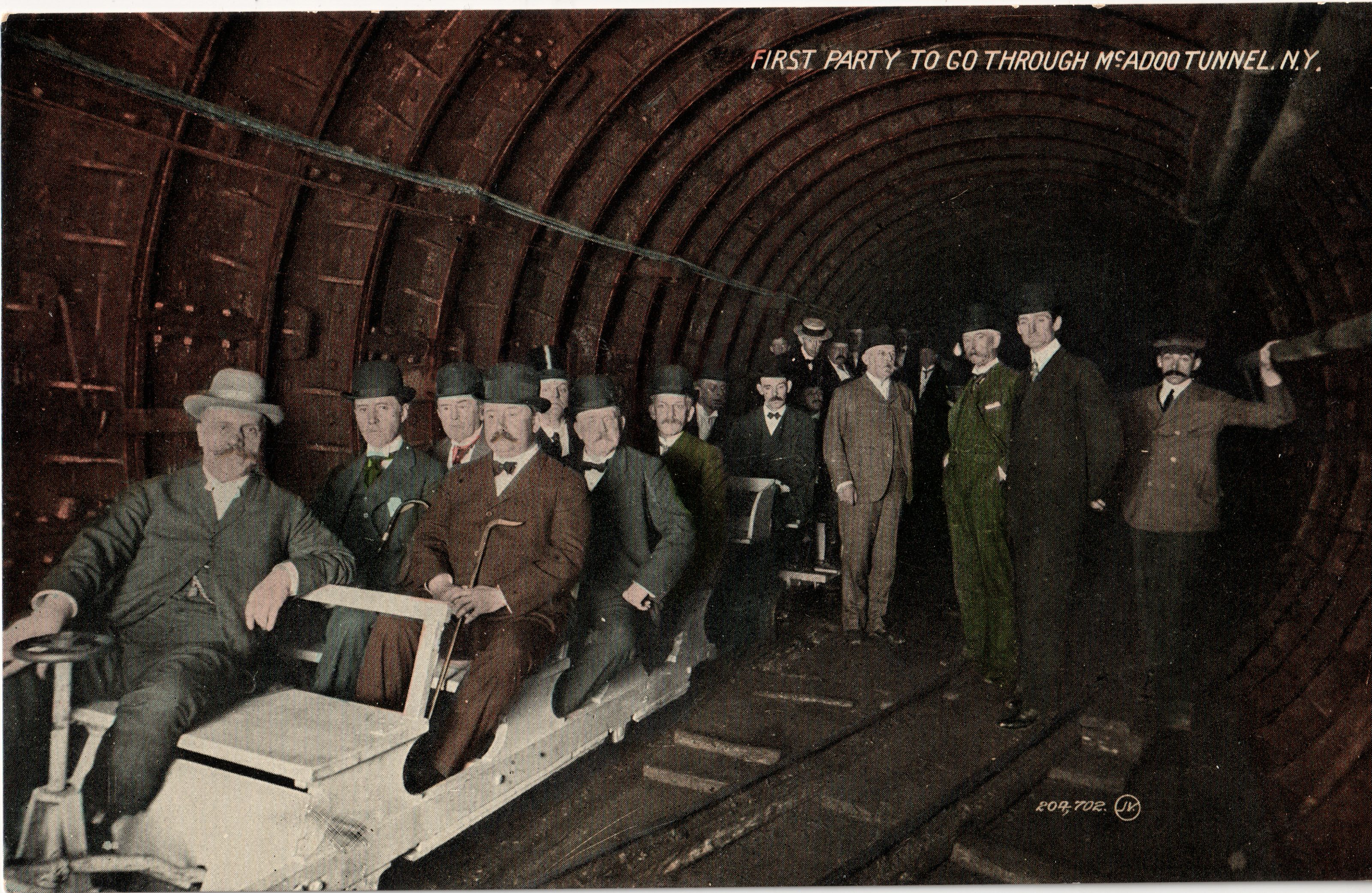
First party to go through McAdoo Tunnel, c. 1908

==== Construction ====
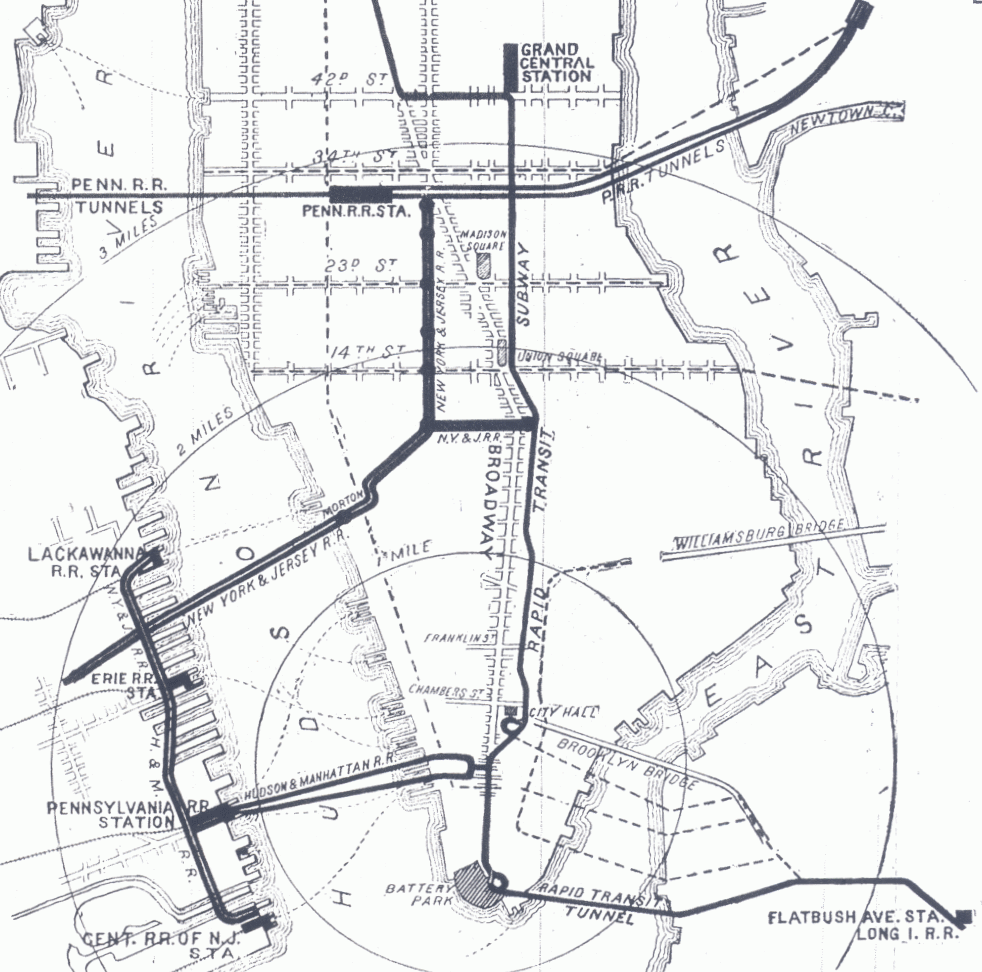
One of the original plans, with branches to the Central Railroad of New Jersey Terminal (lower left) and the IRT Lexington Avenue Line at Astor Place (center)

Construction started on the first tunnel, now called the Uptown Hudson Tubes, in 1873. Chief engineer Dewitt Haskin built the tunnel by using compressed air to open a space in the mud and then lining it with brick. The railroad got 1,200 feet (366 m) from Jersey City this way until a lawsuit stopped work; accidents, including a particularly serious one in 1880 that killed 20 workers, caused additional delays. The project was abandoned in 1883 due to a lack of funds. An effort by a British company, between 1888 and 1892, also failed.

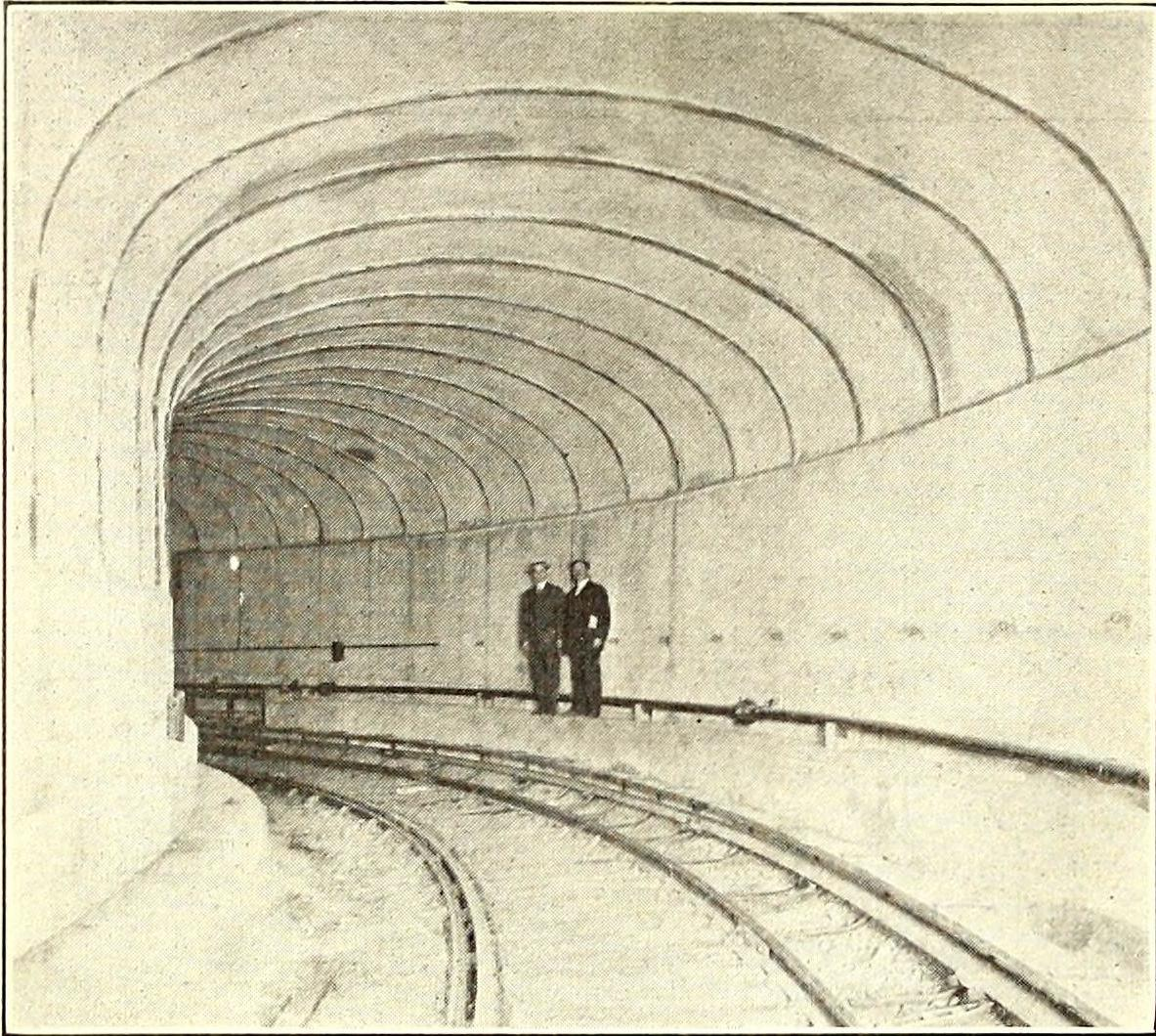
Hudson tunnels shortly after their completion

When the New York and New Jersey Railroad Company resumed construction on the uptown tubes in 1902, its chief engineer, Charles M. Jacobs, used a different method. He had workers push a tunnelling shield through the mud and then place tubular cast iron plating around the tube. The northern tube of the uptown tunnel was completed this way shortly after work resumed and the southern tube was built the same way. The uptown tubes were completed in 1906.

By the end of 1904, the New York City Board of Rapid Transit Commissioners had given the company permission to build a new subway line through Midtown Manhattan to connect with the Uptown Hudson Tubes, along with 26 years of exclusive rights to the line. The Midtown Manhattan line would travel eastward under Christopher Street before turning northeastward under Sixth Avenue, then continue underneath Sixth Avenue to a terminus at 33rd Street.

In January 1905, the Hudson Companies, with $21 million in capital ($753 million in 2025), were incorporated to complete the Uptown Hudson Tubes and build the Sixth Avenue line, as well as construct a second pair of tunnels, the current Downtown Hudson Tubes. The H&M was incorporated in December 1906 to operate a passenger railroad system between New York and New Jersey via the Uptown and Downtown Tubes.

The current Downtown Hudson Tubes were built about 1 1/4 miles (2.0 km) south of the first one. Three years of construction using the tubular cast iron method finished in 1909. The uptown and downtown tunnels had two tubes, each with a single unidirectional track. The eastern sections of the tunnels, in Manhattan, were built with the cut and cover method.

==== Opening ====
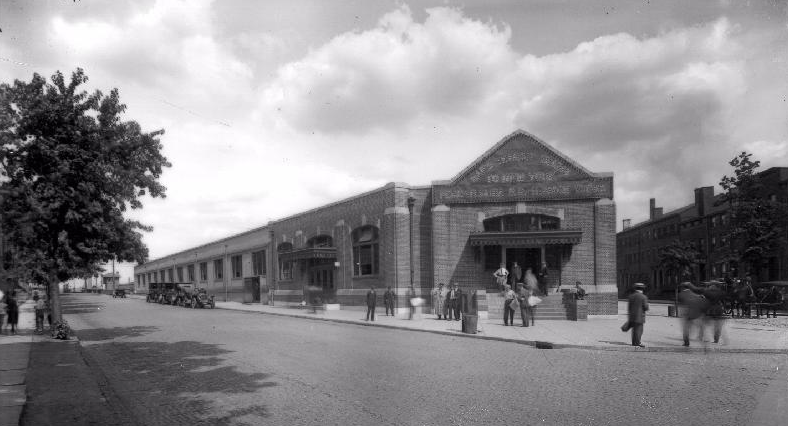
Park Place Station in Newark was the H&MRR's terminus until the completion of Newark Penn Station in the late 1930s.

Test runs of empty trains started in late 1907. Revenue service started between Hoboken Terminal and 19th Street at midnight on February 26, 1908, when President Theodore Roosevelt pressed a button at the White House that turned on the electric lines in the uptown tubes (the first train carrying passengers, all selected officials, had run the previous day). This became part of the current Hoboken–33rd Street line. The H&M system was powered by a 650-volt direct current third rail which, in turn, drew power from an 11,000-volt transmission system with three substations. The substations were the Jersey City Powerhouse, as well as two smaller substations at the Christopher Street and Hudson Terminal stations.

An extension of the H&M from 19th Street to 23rd Street opened in June 1908. In July 1909, service began between the Hudson Terminal in Lower Manhattan and Exchange Place in Jersey City, through the downtown tubes. The connection between Exchange Place and the junction near Hoboken Terminal opened two weeks later, forming the basic route for the Hoboken-Hudson Terminal (now Hoboken–World Trade Center) line. A new line running between 23rd Street and Hudson Terminal was created in September. Almost a year after that, the H&M was extended from Exchange Place west to Grove Street, and the 23rd Street–Hudson Terminal line was rerouted to Grove Street, becoming part of the current Journal Square–33rd Street line. A fourth line, Grove Street–Hudson Terminal (now the Newark–World Trade Center line), was also created. In November 1910, the Hoboken–23rd Street and Grove Street–23rd Street lines were extended from 23rd Street to 33rd Street.

The Grove Street–Hudson Terminal line was extended west from Grove Street to Manhattan Transfer in October 1911, and then to Park Place in Newark on November 26 of that year. After completion of the uptown Manhattan extension to 33rd Street and the westward extension to the now-defunct Manhattan Transfer and Park Place Newark terminus in 1911, the H&M was complete. The final cost was estimated at $55–$60 million ($1.9 billion - $2.07 billion in 2025). A stop at Summit Avenue (now Journal Square), located between Grove Street and Manhattan Transfer, opened in April 1912 as an infill station on the Newark-Hudson Terminal line, though only one platform was in use at the time. The station was completed by February 1913, allowing service from 33rd Street to terminate there. The last station, at Harrison, opened a month later.

==== External relations and unbuilt expansions ====
Map of unbuilt PATH (purple) and H&M (red) expansions. Former routing to Park Place is shown in yellow, and existing lines are shown in black.

Originally, the Hudson Tubes were designed to link three major railroad terminals on the Hudson River in New Jersey—the Erie Railroad (Erie) and Pennsylvania Railroad (PRR) in Jersey City and the Delaware, Lackawanna and Western Railroad (DL&W) in Hoboken—with New York City. While PATH still connects to train stations in Hoboken and Newark, the Erie's Pavonia Terminal at what is now Newport and the PRR terminal at Exchange Place station have been closed and demolished. There were early negotiations for New York Penn Station to also be shared by the two railroads. In 1908, McAdoo proposed to build a branch of the H&M southward to the Central Railroad of New Jersey Terminal at Communipaw.

When the rapid transit commissioners approved construction of the H&M's Sixth Avenue line in 1904, they left open the option of digging an east-west crosstown line. The New York and New Jersey Railroad Company received perpetual rights to dig under Christopher and Ninth Streets eastward to either Second Avenue or Astor Place. The project was started but soon abandoned; about 250 feet (76 m) of the tube that was dug still exists.

In February 1909 the H&M announced plans to extend its Uptown Tubes northeast to Grand Central Terminal, located at Park Avenue and 42nd Street. The openings of the 28th and 33rd Street stations were delayed because of planning for the Grand Central extension. The New York Times speculated that the downtown tunnels would see more passenger use than the uptown tunnels because they better served the city's financial district.

The Interborough Rapid Transit Company (IRT), a competitor to the H&M, proposed to connect its Lexington Avenue line to the H&M at Grand Central, Astor Place, and Fulton Street–Hudson Terminal once the planned system was complete. The H&M terminus at Grand Central was supposed to be located directly below the IRT's 42nd Street line but above the IRT's Steinway Tunnel to Queens. However, the IRT constructed an unauthorized ventilation shaft between its two levels in an effort to force the H&M to build its station very deeply, making it less accessible. As an alternative, it was proposed to connect the Uptown Tubes to the Steinway Tunnel. A franchise to extend the Uptown Tubes to Grand Central was awarded in June 1909.

By 1914, the H&M had not yet started construction of the Grand Central extension, and requested a delay. Six years later, the H&M had submitted 17 applications for delays; in all of them, the railroad said it was not the best time for construction. The Rapid Transit Commissioners declined the last one, effectively ending the H&M's rights to a Grand Central extension.

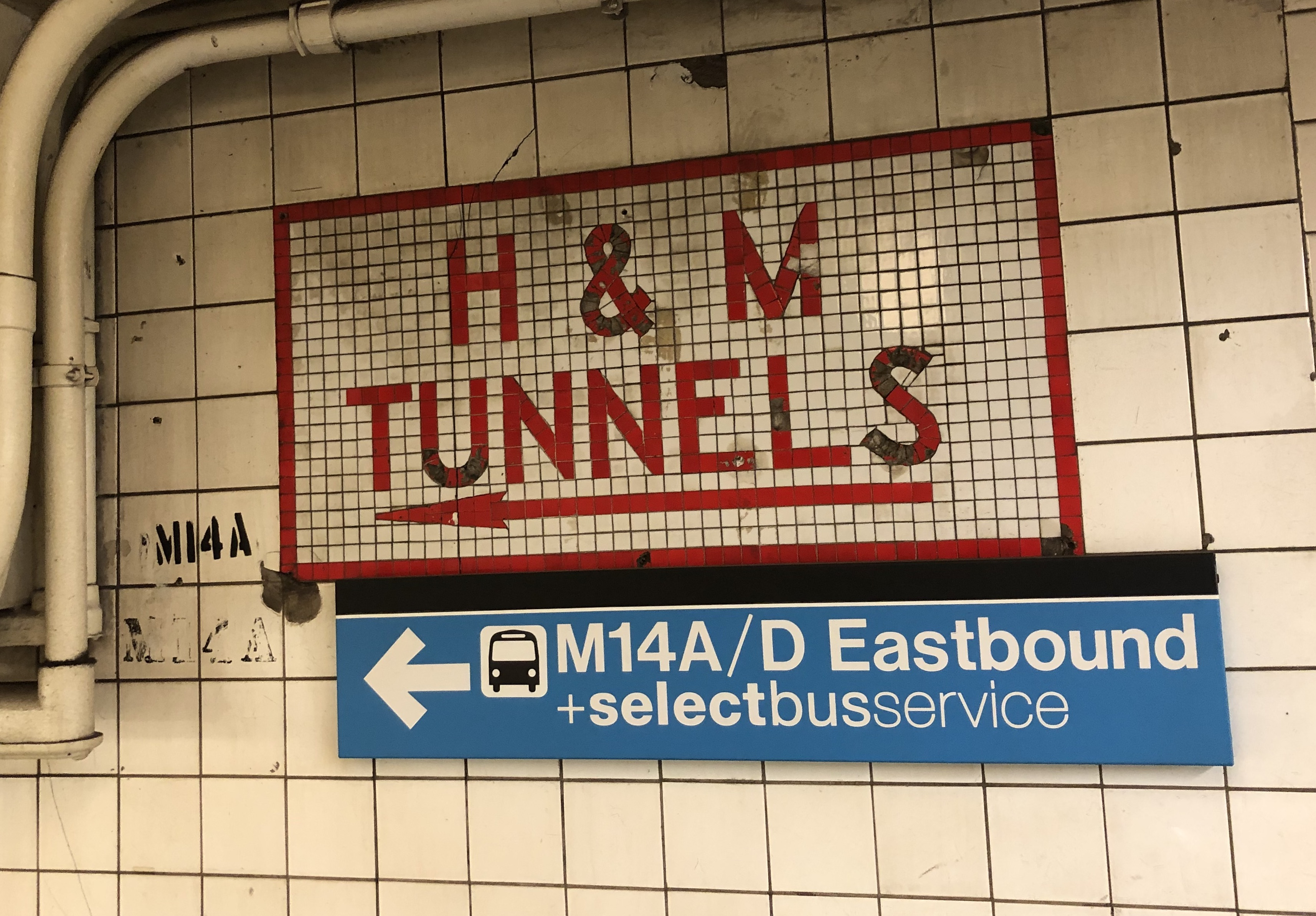
Historic tile work at current 14th street PATH station

In September 1910, McAdoo proposed another expansion, consisting of a second north-south line through midtown. It would run 4 miles (6.4 km) from Hudson Terminal to 33rd Street and Sixth Avenue, underneath Herald Square and near the H&M's existing 33rd Street station. The new line would run mainly under Broadway, with a small section of the line in the south under Church Street. Under McAdoo's plan, the city could take ownership of this line within 25 years of completion.

That November, McAdoo also proposed that the two-track Broadway line be tied into the IRT's original subway line in Lower Manhattan. The Broadway line, going southbound, would merge with the local tracks of the IRT's Lexington Avenue line in the southbound direction at 10th Street. A spur off the Lexington Avenue line in Lower Manhattan, in the back of Trinity Church, would split eastward under Wall Street, cross the East River to Brooklyn, then head down Fourth Avenue in Brooklyn, with another spur underneath Lafayette Avenue. McAdoo wanted not only to operate what was then called the "Triborough System", but also the chance to bid on the Fourth Avenue line in the future. The franchise for the Broadway line was ultimately awarded to the Brooklyn Rapid Transit Company (BRT) in 1913, as part of the Dual Contracts.

In 1909, McAdoo considered extending the H&M in New Jersey, building a branch north to Montclair, in Essex County. A route extending north from Newark would continue straight to East Orange. From there, branches would split to South Orange in the south and Montclair in the north.

==== Decline and bankruptcy ====
A record 113 million people rode the H&M in 1927. Ridership declined after the opening of the Holland Tunnel late that year and fell further once the Great Depression began. The opening of the George Washington Bridge in 1931 and the Lincoln Tunnel in 1937 drew more riders out of trains and into their cars. The Summit Avenue station was renovated and rededicated as "Journal Square" in 1929; the railroad's powerhouse in Jersey City shut down later that year, as its system could now draw energy from the greater power grid.

In the 1930s, service to the Uptown Hudson Tubes in Manhattan was affected by the construction of the Independent Subway System (IND)'s Sixth Avenue Line. The 33rd Street terminal closed in late 1937; service on the H&M was cut back to 28th Street to allow for subway construction. The 33rd Street terminal was moved south to 32nd Street and reopened in 1939. The city had to pay the railroad $800,000 to build the new 33rd Street station; it reimbursed H&M an additional $300,000 for lost revenue. The 28th Street station was closed at this time as unnecessary since the southern entrances to the 33rd Street terminal were only two blocks away; it was later demolished to make room for the IND tracks below.

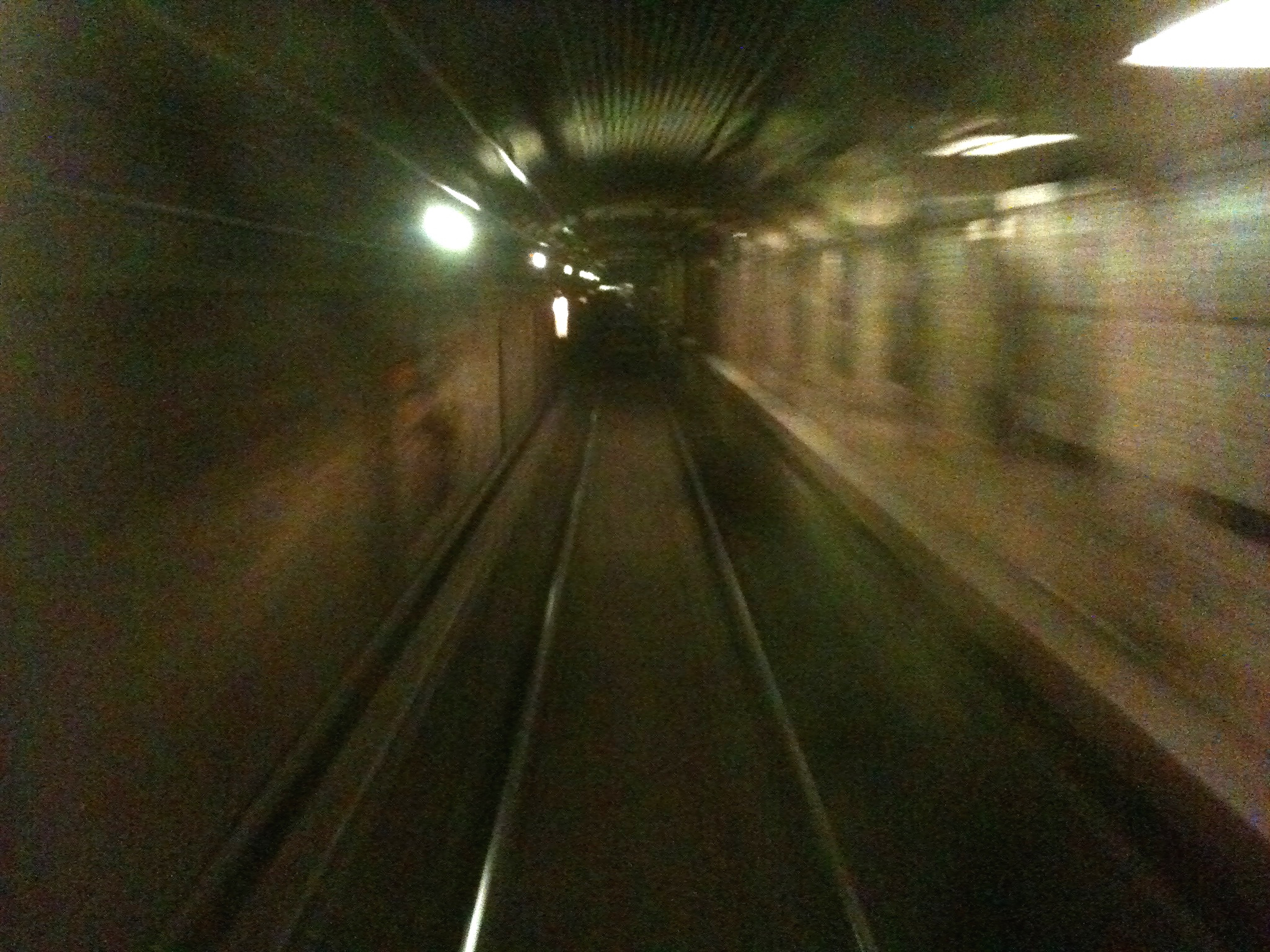
The 19th Street station, abandoned since 1954

The Manhattan Transfer station was closed in mid-1937, and the H&M realigned to Newark Penn Station from the Park Place terminus a quarter-mile (400 m) north; the Harrison station across the Passaic River was moved several blocks south as a result. The upper level of the Centre Street Bridge to Park Place later became Route 158.

Promotions and other advertising failed to stem the financial decline of the H&M. The 19th Street station in Manhattan was closed in 1954. That year, the H&M entered receivership due to its constant losses. It operated under bankruptcy protection; in 1956 the two states agreed to settle its unpaid back taxes for $1.9 million. That year, the H&M saw 37 million annual passengers, and transportation experts called for subsidies. One expert proposed a "rail loop", with the Uptown Hudson Tubes connecting to the IND Sixth Avenue Line, then continuing up Sixth Avenue and west via a new tunnel to Weehawken, New Jersey. By 1958, ridership had dropped to 30.46 million annual passengers. Two years later, creditors approved a reorganization plan. During this time, H&M workers went on strike twice over wages: for two days in 1953, and for a month in 1957.

=== Port Authority takeover ===
In the early 1960s, planning for the World Trade Center resulted in a compromise between the Port Authority and the state governments of New York and New Jersey. The Port Authority agreed to purchase and maintain the Tubes in return for the rights to build the World Trade Center on the footprint of H&M's Hudson Terminal, which was the Lower Manhattan terminus of the Tubes. A formal agreement was made in January 1962; four months later, the Port Authority set up two wholly owned subsidiaries: the Port Authority Trans-Hudson Corporation (PATH) to operate the H&M lines, as well as another subsidiary to operate the World Trade Center. All of the Port Authority's operations would have been subjected to federal Interstate Commerce Commission rules if it ran the trains directly, but with the creation of the PATH Corporation, only the subsidiary's operations would be federally regulated.

In September, the Port Authority formally took over the H&M Railroad and the Tubes, rebranding the system as Port Authority Trans-Hudson (PATH). Upon taking over the H&M, the PANYNJ spent $70 million to modernize the system's infrastructure ($676 million in 2025). The PANYNJ also repainted H&M stations into the new PATH livery. In 1964, the authority ordered 162 PA1 railway cars to replace the H&M rolling stock, much of which dated to 1909. The first PA1 cars were delivered in 1965. Subsequently, the agency ordered 44 PA2 cars in 1967 and 46 PA3 cars in 1972.

=== Late 20th century ===
==== 1970s ====
As part of the World Trade Center's construction, the Port Authority decided to demolish Hudson Terminal and construct a new World Trade Center Terminal. Groundbreaking took place in 1966. During excavation and construction, the original Downtown Hudson Tubes remained in service as elevated tunnels. The new terminal, west of the Hudson Terminal, opened in 1971. It cost $35 million to build, and saw 85,000 daily passengers at the time of its opening. Hudson Terminal was then shut down.

The Journal Square Transportation Center opened in 1973, consolidating operations in the 10-story building that is part of the complex.

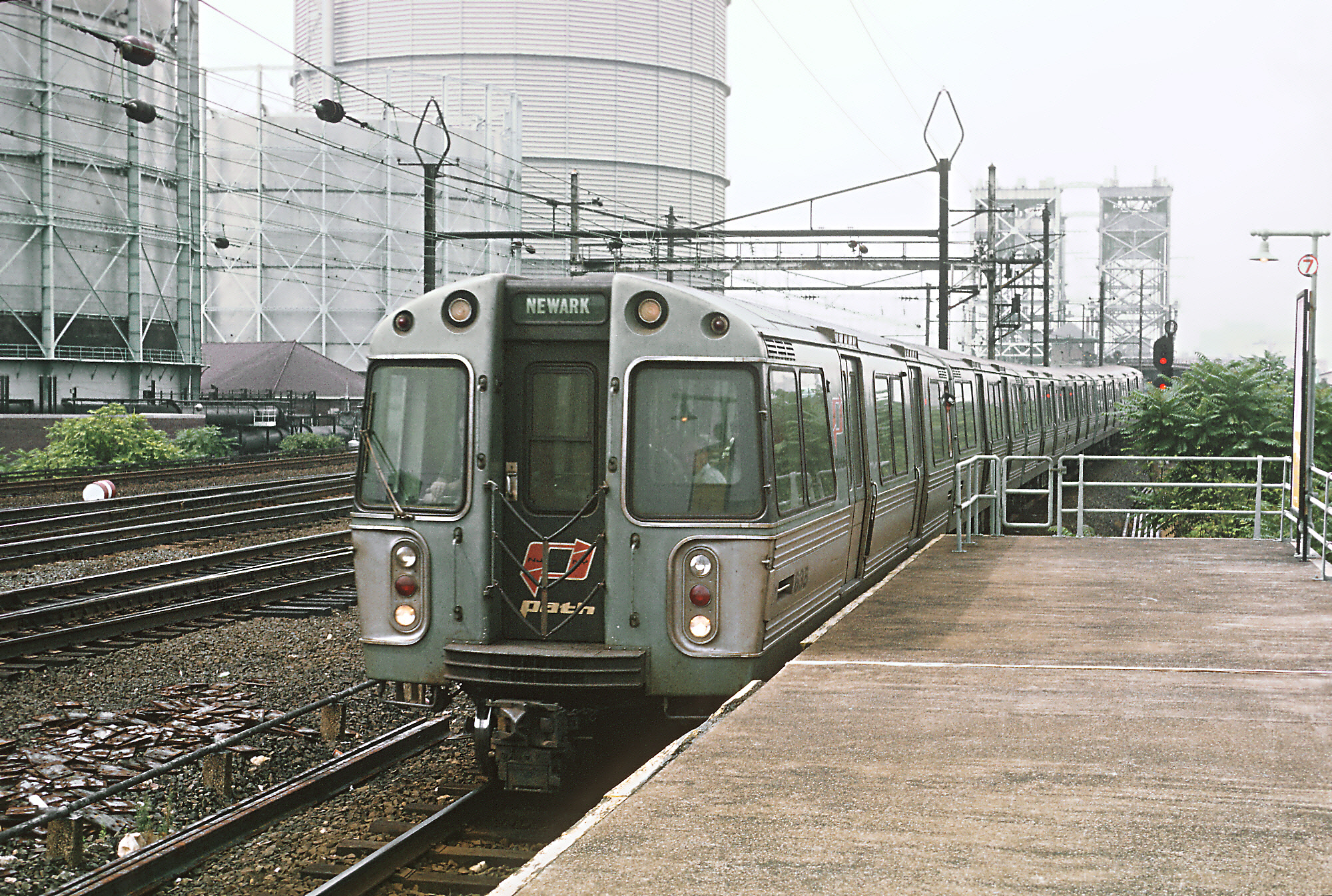
PATH arriving at Harrison, NJ in 1969

In January 1973, the Port Authority released plans to double the route mileage of the PATH system with an extension from Newark Penn Station to Plainfield, New Jersey. A stop at Elizabeth would allow PATH to serve Newark Airport, where passengers could transfer to a people mover serving the terminals. Preliminary studies of the right-of-way, as well as a design contract, were conducted that year. The extension was approved in 1975. The Federal Urban Mass Transit Administration was less enthusiastic about the extension's efficacy and reluctant to give the Port Authority the $322 million it had requested for the project, about 80% of the projected cost. Eventually, the administration agreed to back it, but in 1977, the U.S. Supreme Court ruled that the two state legislatures had violated the U.S. Constitution's Contract Clause by repealing a covenant in the 1962 bond agreements in order to make the extension possible. In June 1978, the extension, by then estimated to cost $600 million ($2.96 billion in 2025), was canceled in favor of improving bus service in New Jersey.

==== Strikes ====
Labor problems also beset PATH during this time. After a January 1973 strike over salary increases was averted, talks failed and workers walked out in April. A month into the strike, negotiations broke down again; the union returned to work in June.

The 1980 New York City transit strike suspended service on the New York City Transit Authority (NYCTA)'s bus and subway routes for 10 days. A special PATH route ran from 33rd Street to World Trade Center via Midtown Manhattan, Pavonia–Newport, and Exchange Place during the NYCTA strike. PATH motormen also threatened to go on strike during this time for different reasons. The special service was suspended in April after some workers refused overtime.

In June 1980, PATH workers again went on strike for higher pay, their first such action since 1973. During the strike, moisture built up in the tunnels and rust accumulated on the tracks; pumps in the underwater tunnels remained in operation, preventing the tubes from flooding. Alternative service across the Hudson River was provided by "inadequate" shuttle buses through the Holland Tunnel. The 81-day strike was the longest in PATH's history.

==== 1980s and 1990s ====
Substantial growth in PATH ridership during the 1980s required expansion and improvement of the railroad's infrastructure. The Port Authority announced a plan in 1988 that would allow stations on the Newark–WTC line to accommodate longer eight-car trains while seven-car trains could operate between Journal Square and 33rd Street. Two years later, it announced a $1 billion plan to renovate the PATH stations and add new cars. Video monitors were installed in stations to make money from advertising. PATH also sought a fare hike, even though that would reduce its per passenger subsidy, to reduce its $135 million annual deficit. By 1992, the Port Authority had spent $900 million on infrastructure improvements, including repairing tracks, modernizing communications and signaling, replacing ventilation equipment, and installing elevators at seven stations per the Americans with Disabilities Act of 1990 (ADA).

A $225 million car maintenance facility was opened in Harrison in 1990. It replaced PATH's old Henderson Street Yard—a below-grade, open-air train storage yard at the northeast corner of Marin Boulevard and Christopher Columbus Drive just east of the Grove Street station.

High tides from the December 1992 nor'easter flooded the PATH tunnels, including a 2,500–3,000-foot (760–910 m) section between Hoboken and Pavonia. Most trains were stopped before reaching the floods, but one became stalled near Hoboken Terminal. Some water pumps within the system were overwhelmed. The Newark–World Trade Center service was not disrupted afterwards, but the Journal Square–33rd Street service was slowed because several spots along the route needed to be pumped out. Service to Hoboken was suspended for 10 days, the longest disruption since the summer 1980 strike.

A section of ceiling in the World Trade Center PATH station collapsed and trapped dozens during the 1993 World Trade Center bombing; the station itself did not suffer any structural damage. Within three days, PATH service to the station resumed.

In the summer of 1993, the Port Authority banned tobacco advertisements in all trains and stations. A new wash for cars opened in mid-September 1993 in Jersey City, replacing the one at the 33rd Street terminal. In April 1994, an ADA-compliant entrance to the Exchange Place station was opened. Two years later, three trains began running express on the Newark–World Trade Center service for six months, cutting running time by 3 1/2 minutes. Weekend Hoboken–World Trade Center service began in October 1996 on a six-month trial basis, and the express Newark–World Trade Center service was made permanent on the same day.

=== 21st century ===
==== September 11, 2001, and recovery ====
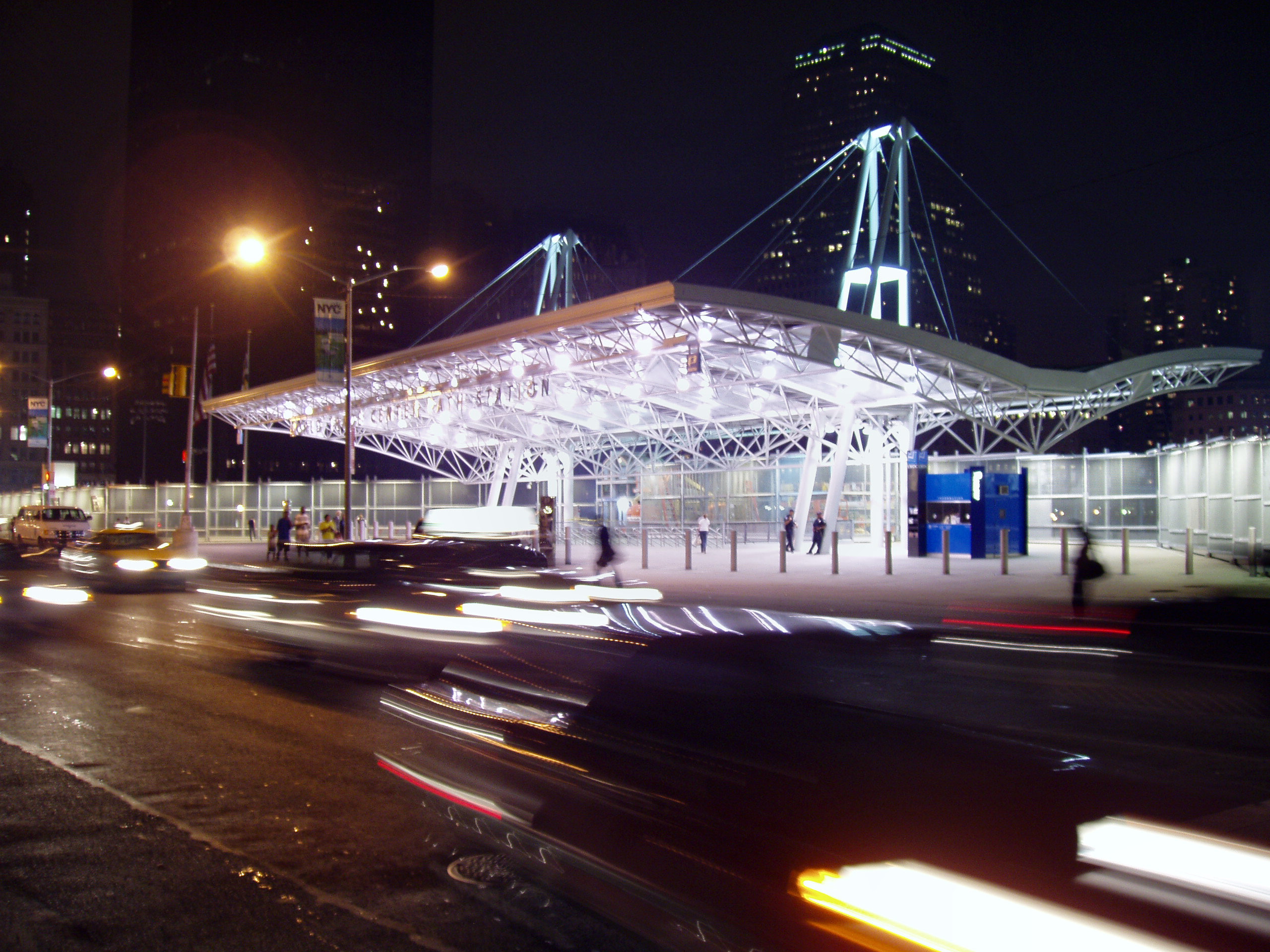
The temporary World Trade Center station opened in 2003.

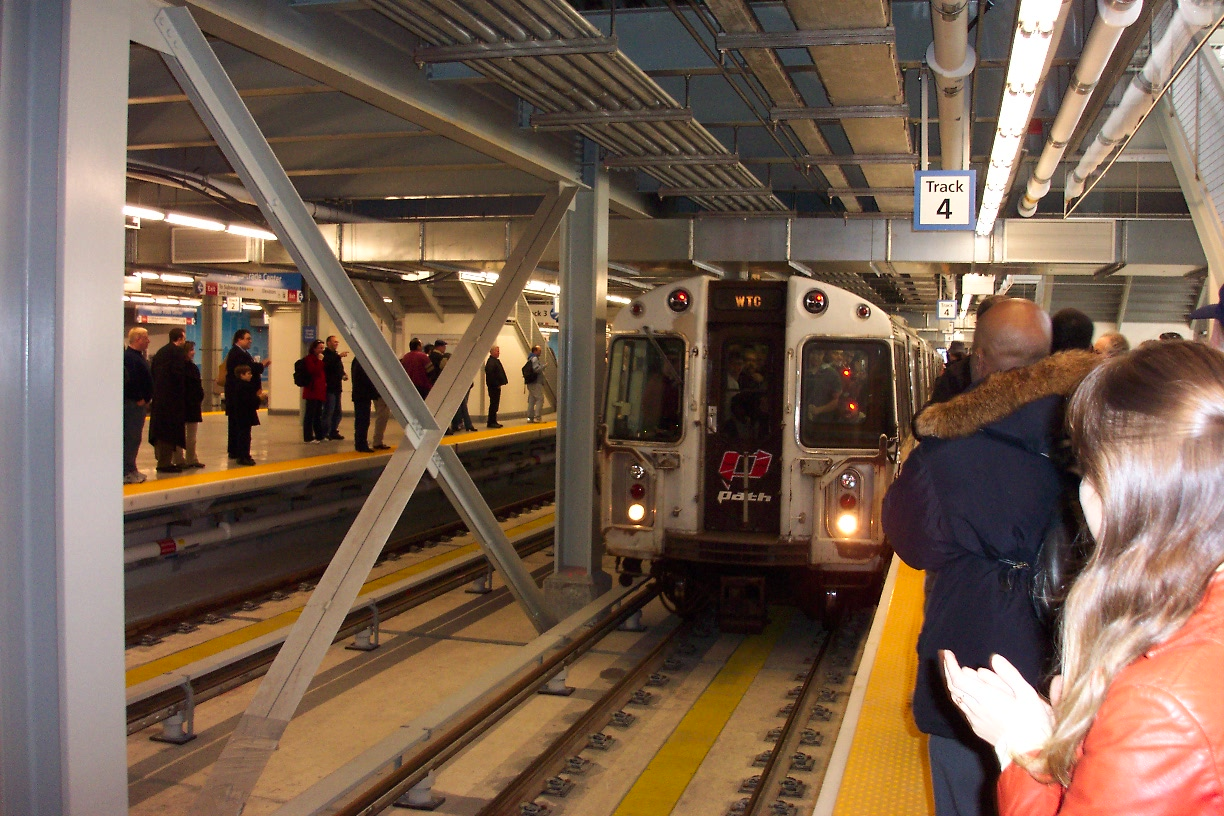
Passengers applaud as the inaugural train from Newark arrives at PATH's temporary WTC station in 2003.

The World Trade Center station in Lower Manhattan, under the World Trade Center, one of PATH's two New York terminals, was destroyed during the September 11 attacks, when the Twin Towers above it collapsed. Just prior to the collapse, the station was closed and all passengers evacuated. Service to Lower Manhattan was suspended indefinitely. Exchange Place, the next-to-last station before World Trade Center, had to be closed as well because trains could not turn around there; it had also suffered severe water damage. A temporary PATH terminal at the World Trade Center was approved in December 2001 and projected to open in two years. Shortly after the attacks, the Port Authority started operating two uptown services: Newark–33rd Street and Hoboken–33rd Street, and one intrastate New Jersey service, Hoboken–Journal Square. A single nighttime service was instituted: Newark–33rd Street (via Hoboken).

In the meantime, modifications were made to a stub end tunnel to allow trains from Newark to reach the Hoboken-bound tunnel and vice versa. The modifications required PATH to bore through the bedrock between the stub tunnel and the Newark tunnels. The stub, the "Penn Pocket", had been built to take PRR commuters from Harborside Terminal on short turn World Trade Center to Exchange Place runs. The new Exchange Place station opened in June 2003. Because of the original alignment of the tracks, trains to or from Hoboken used separate tunnels from the Newark service. Eastbound trains from Newark crossed over to the westbound track just west of Exchange Place, where they reversed direction and used a crossover switch to go to Hoboken. Eastbound trains from Hoboken entered on the eastbound track at Exchange Place, then reversing direction and used the same crossover switch to get on the westbound track to Newark before entering Grove Street.

PATH service to Lower Manhattan was restored when a new, $323 million second station opened in November 2003; the inaugural train was the same one that had been used for the evacuation. The second, temporary station contained portions of the original station, but did not have heating or air conditioning. The temporary entrance was closed in July 2007, then demolished to make way for the third, permanent station; around the same time, the Church Street entrance opened. A new entrance on Vesey Street opened in March 2008; the Church entrance was demolished.

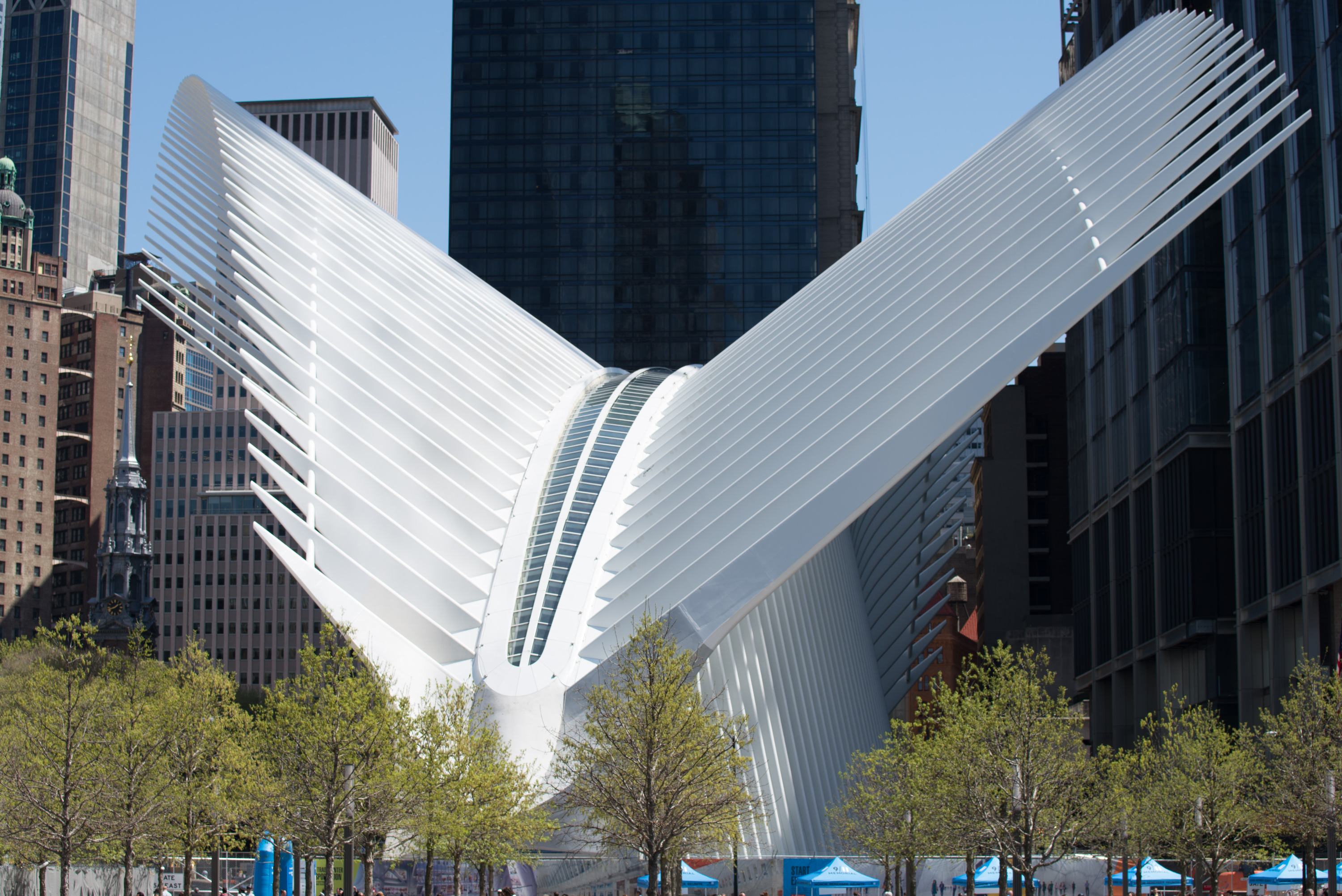
The completed World Trade Center Transportation Hub in April 2016

The construction of the permanent four-platform World Trade Center Transportation Hub started in July 2008, when the first prefabricated "ribs" for the pedestrian walkway under Fulton Street were installed. Platform A, the first part of the permanent station, opened in February 2014, serving Hoboken-bound riders. Platform B and the remaining half of Platform A opened in May 2015. The hub formally opened in March 2016 with part of the headhouse. Platforms C and D, the last two, were opened that September.

==== Post-Hurricane Sandy ====
In the early morning hours of October 29, 2012, all PATH service was suspended in advance of Hurricane Sandy. The following day, New Jersey Governor Chris Christie announced that PATH service would be out for 7–10 days due to the storm damage. Storm surge from the hurricane caused significant flooding to the Hoboken and Jersey City stations, as well as at the World Trade Center. An image captured by a PATH security camera showing water flowing into Hoboken during the storm went viral online and became one of several representative images of the hurricane. The first PATH trains after the hurricane were the Journal Square–33rd Street service, which resumed on November 6 and ran only in daytime. Service was extended west to Harrison and Newark on November 12, in place of the Newark–World Trade Center service. Christopher Street and Ninth Street were reopened during the weekend of November 17–18, but remained closed for five days afterward. Normal weekday service on the Newark–World Trade Center and Journal Square–33rd Street lines resumed on November 26. On weekends, trains operated using the Newark–33rd Street service pattern.

The PATH station at Hoboken Terminal suffered major damage after floodwaters as high as eight feet (2.4 m) submerged the tunnels; it was closed for several weeks for $300 million worth of repairs. The Newark–33rd Street route was suspended for two weekends in mid-December, with the Newark–World Trade Center running in its place, in order to expedite the return of Hoboken service. Hoboken Terminal reopened in December for weekday daytime Hoboken–33rd Street service, followed by the resumption of weekday 24-hour PATH service in early 2013. The Hoboken–World Trade Center trains resumed in late January, and all normal service was restored by March. The Downtown Hudson Tubes were severely damaged by Sandy. As a result, to accommodate repairs, service on the Newark–World Trade Center line between Exchange Place and World Trade Center was to be suspended during almost all weekends, except for holidays, in 2019 and 2020. However, weekend service was restored in June 2020, six months ahead of schedule.

==== 2010s improvements ====
The Port Authority began rebuilding the Harrison station in 2009. It has longer and wider platforms to allow 10-car trains; street-level-to-platform elevators within the platform extensions, in compliance with the ADA, and architectural modifications. The westbound platform of the new Harrison station opened to the public in October 2018 and the eastbound one the following June.

In January 2010, Christopher O. Ward, as executive director, announced that PATH would be spending $321 million on communications-based train control (CBTC) with Siemens' Trainguard MT, upgrading its signal system for an increase in ridership. CBTC would replace a four-decade old fixed-block signaling system. It would reduce the headway time between trains, allowing more to run during rush hours. At the same time, the entire PATH fleet was replaced with 340 CBTC-equipped PA5 cars, built by Kawasaki Railcar. The original contract was completed in 2011; additional cars were delivered in subsequent years. PATH's goal was to increase passenger capacity from 240,000 passengers a day to 290,000. The entire CBTC system was originally expected to become operational in 2017. The Port Authority also spent $659 million to upgrade 13 platforms on the Newark–World Trade Center line to accommodate 10-car trains; until then, the line could only run eight-car trains.

Along with CBTC, PATH began installing positive train control (PTC), another safety system, during the 2010s, per a Federal Railroad Administration (FRA) mandate that all American railroads have it by the end of 2018. The Newark–World Trade Center line west of Journal Square was converted to PTC in April 2018, followed by the segments of track east of Journal Square the following month. This caused delays across the entire system when train operators had to slow down and manually adjust their trains to switch between the two signaling systems. PTC was tested on the Uptown Hudson Tubes from July to October 2018, forcing weekend closures. PTC was finished in November 2018, a month ahead of schedule; and the entire system was converted by December.

The Port Authority also installed two amenities in all PATH stations. Cellphone service was added for all customers by early 2019. Countdown clocks, displaying the time the next train arrives, were installed in all PATH stations that year. Subsequently, in June 2019, the Port Authority released the PATH Improvement Plan, calling for over $1 billion in investments, including $80 million to extend Newark–World Trade Center line platforms, as well as funding for two ongoing projects: $752.6 million to complete the CBTC system by 2022 and $215.7 million on the new PA5 cars by 2022. The goal is to increase train frequencies on the Newark–World Trade Center line by 40 percent, and 20 percent on other lines, during rush hours. Every train on the Newark–World Trade Center line would be nine cars long. In addition, the platform at Grove Street would be extended eastward, at the Marin Boulevard end of the station, and two additional cross-corridors would be added at Exchange Place. The Port Authority would also allocate funds to study the implementation of 10-car trains. In September 2019, service on the Newark–World Trade Center and Journal Square–33rd Street lines would be increased by 10 percent during rush hours, reducing the headway between trains from four minutes to three.

==== 2020s ====
In 2019, the last year before the onset of the COVID-19 pandemic, the PATH carried an average of 284,000 people per day. The second quarter of 2020, which included the nadir of the pandemic across the New York metropolitan area, was the worst quarter in PATH's history, with a $777 million decline in revenues throughout all of the PANYNJ's facility and a specific ridership decline of 94 percent on the PATH system. Train service returned to 96 percent of 2019 levels in June 2020, yet ridership continued to lag far below pre-pandemic numbers, rebounding to only 60 percent of 2019 ridership by February 2022. Amid the spread of the Omicron variant, PANYNJ was projected to reach $3 billion in pandemic losses by March 2022. The platform-lengthening project was finished the same year. In February 2023, it was announced that nine-car operation on the Newark–World Trade Center line would begin the next month; nine-car trains began operating on March 22, 2023.

PANYNJ commissioners voted in late 2023 to spend $230 million replacing some wheel sets on the PA5 fleet and replacing tracks on the New Jersey side. In 2024, the PANYNJ announced that it would spend $430 million to refurbish four stations and replace railroad switches as part of the PATH Forward program. In addition, the agency announced that the Hoboken Terminal station would be closed and extensively refurbished during February 2025. As part of its 2026–2035 capital plan, the PANYNJ announced in November 2025 that it would increase weekend service, with all four weekday lines running during the weekend, and that fares would incrementally increase annually from $2.90 to $4.00 by 2029. In 2026, the PANYNJ announced that it would replace turnstiles at all PATH stations for $3.5 million. The PATH Forward improvements were completed in late April 2026. The weekend service changes took effect on May 17, 2026.

=== Proposed expansions ===
==== Newark Airport extension proposals ====
In the mid-2000s, a Newark Airport extension was considered as the Port Authority allocated $31 million for a feasibility study of extending service two miles (3.2 km) from Newark Penn Station, estimated at that time to cost $500 million; the study began in 2012. In September 2013, Crain's reported that New Jersey Governor Chris Christie would publicly support the extension, estimated by then to cost $1 billion. The governor asked that the airport's largest operator, United Airlines, consider flying to Atlantic City International Airport as an enticement to further the project.

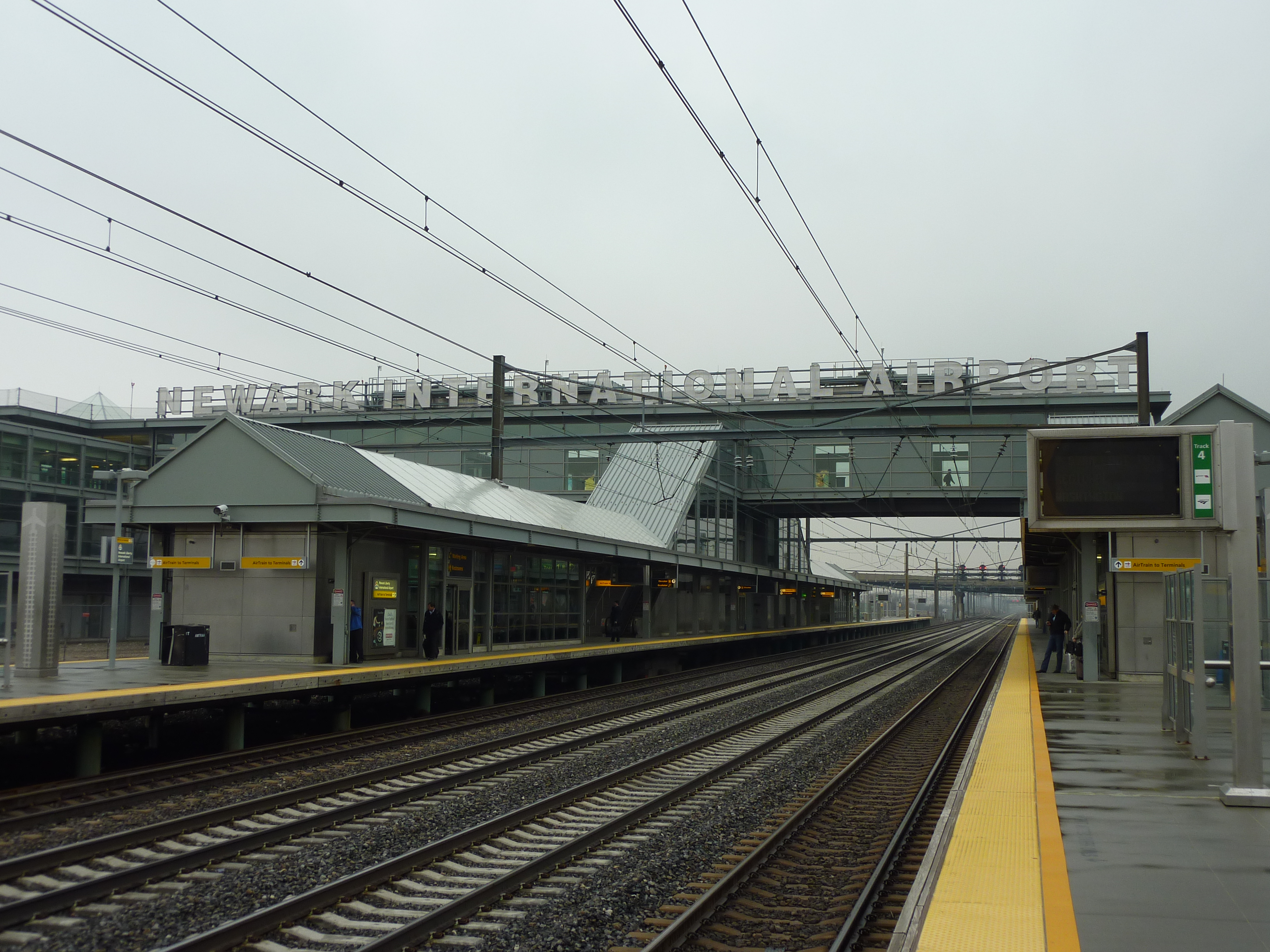
Newark Liberty Airport International Station, to which PATH service would be extended

In February 2014, the Port Authority's Board of Commissioners approved a 10-year capital plan that included the PATH extension to NJ Transit's Newark Liberty International Airport Station. The alignment would follow the existing Northeast Corridor approximately one mile (1.6 km) further south to the Newark Airport station, where a connection to AirTrain Newark is available. Five years of construction were expected to begin in 2018.

In late 2014, there were calls for a reconsideration of Port Authority funding priorities. The PATH extension followed the route of existing Manhattan-to-Newark Airport train service (on NJ Transit's Northeast Corridor Line and North Jersey Coast Line as well as Amtrak's Keystone Service and Northeast Regional). On the other hand, there was no funding for either the Gateway Tunnel, a pair of commuter train tunnels that would supplement the North River Tunnels under the Hudson, or the replacement for the Port Authority Bus Terminal. In December 2014, the PANYNJ awarded a three-year, $6 million contract to infrastructure design firm HNTB to do a cost analysis of the Newark Airport extension.

In 2017, the PANYNJ released a 10-year capital plan that included $1.7 billion for the extension; at the time, construction was projected to start in 2020, with service in 2025. A presentation at two December 2017 public meetings showed the new PATH station would include a park-and-ride lot and a new entrance from the nearby Dayton neighborhood. An extension of the PATH to Newark Airport was still being considered in mid-2022, but the PANYNJ announced in March 2023 that it was deferring funding for the Newark Airport extension to a future capital plan. In December 2025, the PANYNJ announced that the Newark Airport PATH extension would be delayed by ten years because the agency was prioritizing the ongoing replacement of the AirTrain Newark.

==== Marion station proposal ====
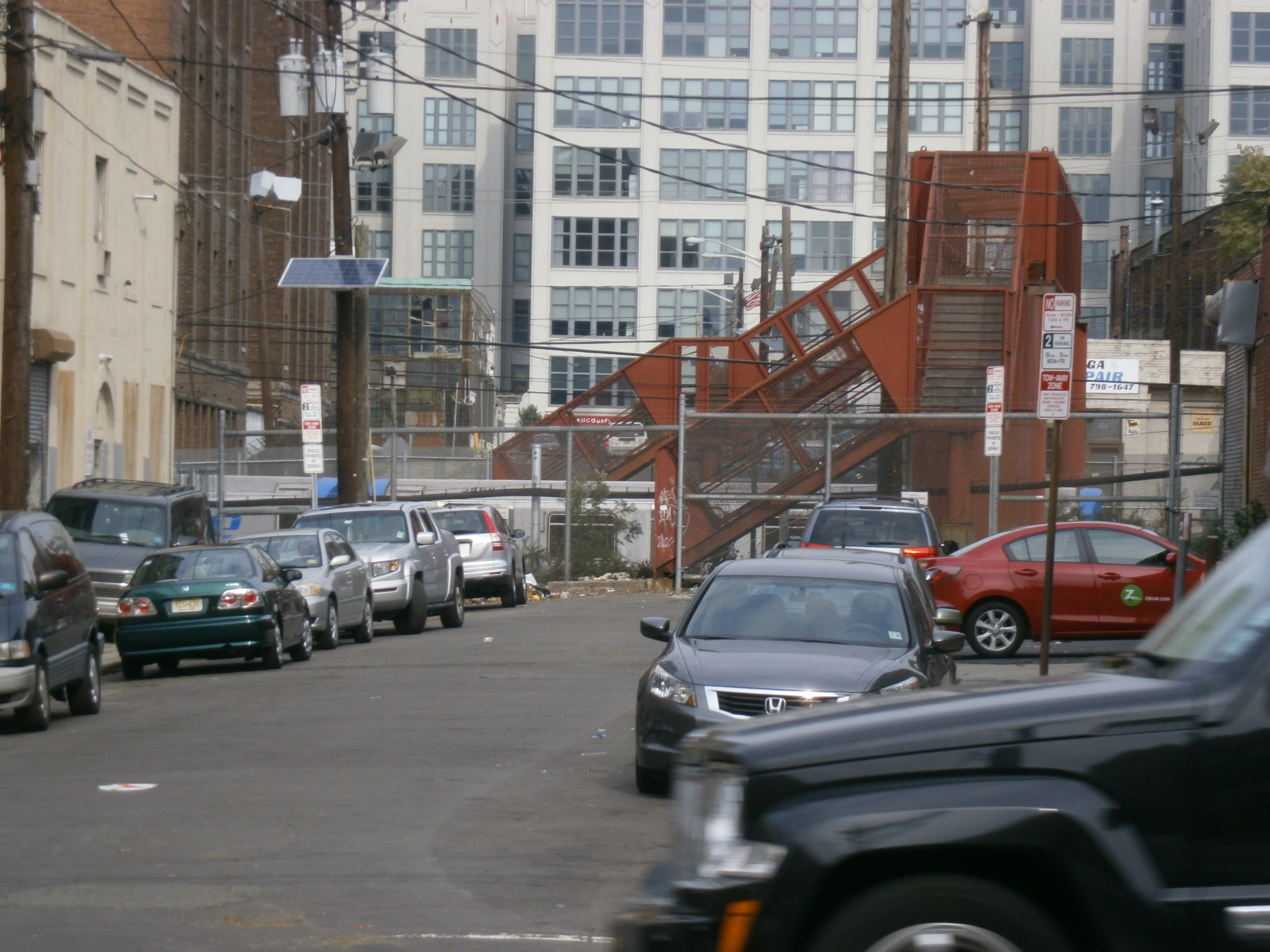
The Marion Section separated by PATH tracks crossed by a pedestrian bridge

West of Journal Square in Jersey City, the NWK-WTC line runs through the Marion Section parallel to the Conrail Passaic and Harsimus Line freight line. A pedestrian bridge crosses the tracks. Since the 1980s, there have been calls for an infill station to be built there. In 2018, the government of Jersey City and the PANYNJ reached an agreement that included a feasibility study for a potential station, which resulted in the "Marion PATH Station Physical Feasibility Study". The senior U.S. Senator, the Hudson County Executive, and the Mayor of Jersey City have written letters encouraging the PANYNJ to continue with the project. The estimated cost of construction varies and could be funded by nearby real estate developers.

== Route operation ==
PATH operates 24 hours a day, seven days a week. During the daytime, PATH operates four train services, direct descendants of the four original services operated by the H&M, using three terminals in New Jersey and two in Manhattan. During late nights and weekend mornings, PATH operates two services from two terminals in New Jersey and two in Manhattan.

Each line is represented by a unique color on timetables and service maps, which also corresponds to the color of the marker lights on the front of trains. The Journal Square–33rd Street (via Hoboken) service is the only line represented by two colors (yellow and blue), since it is a late-night/weekend/holiday combination of PATH's two midtown services, Journal Square–33rd Street and Hoboken–33rd Street. During peak hours, trains operate every four to eight minutes on each service. Every PATH station except Newark and Harrison is served by a train every two to three minutes, for a peak-hour service of 20–30 trains per hour.

According to the American Public Transportation Association, in 2025, the system saw 64,318,300 rides, or about 228,400 per weekday in the second quarter of 2026, making it the fifth-busiest rapid transit system in the United States. In 2024, PATH saw 57.25 million passengers. As of June 2019, the system is used by over 186,000 passengers per weekday; almost 105,000 per Saturday; almost 79,000 per Sunday; and nearly 98,000 per holiday. The busiest station is World Trade Center, with more than 13.3 million riders, while the least busy station is 9th Street, with 1.19 million riders.

These levels of ridership notwithstanding, PATH runs at a deficit, losing about $400 million per year. While some of its recent improvements, particularly in Harrison, have spurred local development, it cannot benefit from that directly as the Port Authority is limited to the revenue it makes from the fees, fares, and tolls it collects, with the state and local governments collecting the sales, income and property taxes arising from development. Its costs are correspondingly increased by having to comply with FRA regulations. PATH is thus subsidized by the Port Authority from surpluses at its airports and seaports.

=== Services ===
The PATH system has 13.8 miles (22.2 km) of route mileage, counting route overlaps only once. Between 6 a.m. and 11 p.m. on weekdays and 10 a.m. and 9 p.m. on weekends, four services operate:

- Newark–World Trade Center, also known as NWK-WTC
- Hoboken–World Trade Center, or HOB-WTC
- Journal Square–33rd Street, or JSQ-33
- Hoboken–33rd Street, or HOB-33

Between 11 p.m. and 6 a.m. weekdays and 9 p.m. and 10 a.m. weekends, PATH operates two train services:

- Newark–World Trade Center
- Journal Square–33rd Street (via Hoboken), or JSQ-33 (via HOB)

Prior to 2001, both the Hoboken–World Trade Center and Journal Square–33rd Street services were offered on Saturday, Sunday, and holidays between 9 a.m. and 7:30 p.m. Following the September 11 attacks, a new Newark–33rd Street (via Hoboken) service was created during late nights. It was cutback to Journal Square and renamed the Journal Square–33rd Street (via Hoboken) service when Exchange Place reopened on June 29, 2003, also running both late nights and weekends, discontinuing the Journal Square–33rd Street service on weekends.

In April 2006, weekend service on the Hoboken–World Trade Center was discontinued and was replaced with the Journal Square–33rd Street (via Hoboken) service. During this time, passengers wanting to travel from Hoboken to Lower Manhattan were told to take the Journal Square–33rd Street (via Hoboken) service to Grove Street and transfer to the Newark–World Trade Center train.

PATH does not normally operate directly from Newark to Midtown Manhattan. Passengers wanting to travel from Newark to Midtown via PATH are told to transfer to the Journal Square–33rd Street service at Journal Square or Grove Street. However, after both the September 11 attacks and Hurricane Sandy, special Newark–33rd Street services were operated to compensate for the complete loss of service to Lower Manhattan. An intrastate Journal Square–Hoboken service was also operated after the attacks. The Journal Square–Hoboken and Newark–33rd Street services instituted after the attacks were canceled by 2003.

From July to October 2018, because of PTC installation on the Uptown Hudson Tubes, the Journal Square–33rd Street (via Hoboken) service was suspended on most weekends. In the meantime, it was replaced by the Journal Square–World Trade Center (via Hoboken) and the restored Journal Square–Hoboken services, since all stations between Christopher and 33rd Streets were closed during the weekends. In 2026, the three weekday lines will start running on weekends as well, replacing the Journal Square–33rd Street (via Hoboken) service pattern.

Lengths of trains on all lines except the Newark–World Trade Center line are limited to seven cars, since the platforms at Hoboken, Christopher Street, Ninth Street, and 33rd Street can only accommodate seven cars and cannot be extended. In 2009, the Port Authority started upgrading platforms along the Newark–World Trade Center line so that it could accommodate 10-car trains; the route began operating 9-car trains in 2023.

==== Network map ====
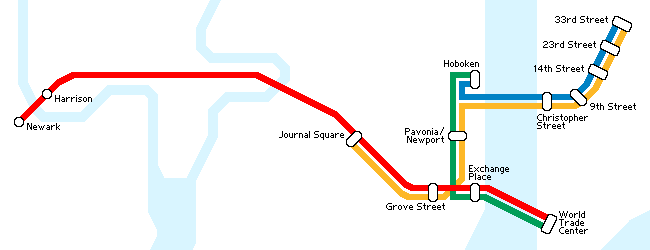
Map of the PATH system (regular service)

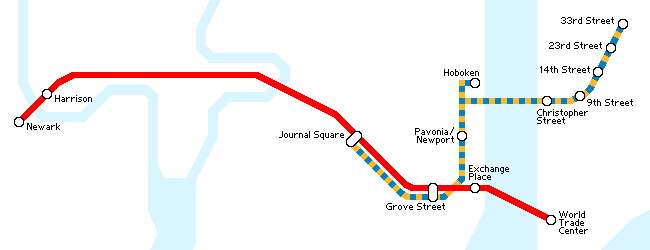
Map of the PATH system (late-night hours)

To-scale map of the PATH system

=== Station list ===
Station	Services	State	City	Opened	Closed	County/Borough	Ridership (2024)	Rank
Ninth Street	HOB–33; JSQ–33	NY	New York	February 25, 1908		Manhattan	1,192,086	13
14th Street	HOB–33; JSQ–33	NY	New York	February 25, 1908		Manhattan	1,792,523	10
19th Street		NY	New York	February 25, 1908	August 1, 1954	Manhattan		
23rd Street	HOB–33; JSQ–33	NY	New York	June 15, 1908		Manhattan	1,706,994	11
28th Street		NY	New York	November 10, 1910	September 24, 1939	Manhattan		
33rd Street	HOB–33; JSQ–33	NY	New York	November 10, 1910		Manhattan	6,720,192	3
Christopher Street	HOB–33; JSQ–33	NY	New York	February 25, 1908		Manhattan	1,321,256	12
Exchange Place	NWK–WTC; HOB–WTC	NJ	Jersey City	July 19, 1909		Hudson	3,525,285	8
Grove Street	NWK–WTC; JSQ–33	NJ	Jersey City	September 6, 1910		Hudson	4,884,577	6
Harrison	NWK–WTC	NJ	Harrison	June 20, 1937		Hudson	1,901,908	9
Hoboken	HOB–WTC; HOB–33	NJ	Hoboken	February 25, 1908		Hudson	5,365,820	4
Hudson Terminal		NY	New York	July 19, 1909	July 2, 1971	Manhattan		
Journal Square	NWK–WTC; JSQ–33	NJ	Jersey City	April 14, 1912		Hudson	6,868,655	2
Manhattan Transfer		NJ	Harrison	October 1, 1911	June 20, 1937	Hudson		
Newark	NWK–WTC	NJ	Newark	June 20, 1937		Essex	4,946,510	5
Newport	HOB–WTC; JSQ–33	NJ	Jersey City	August 2, 1909		Hudson	3,653,326	7
Park Place		NJ	Newark	November 26, 1911	June 20, 1937	Essex		
World Trade Center	NWK–WTC; HOB–WTC	NY	New York	July 6, 1971		Manhattan	13,368,349	1

All New Jersey stations, as well as the World Trade Center and 33rd Street terminals in New York, are compliant with the Americans with Disabilities Act of 1990. Harrison, the last non-accessible station in New Jersey, was made fully accessible in 2019. The only non-accessible stations are the four intermediate stations on the Manhattan side of the Uptown Tubes–Christopher Street, Ninth Street, 14th Street, and 23rd Street.

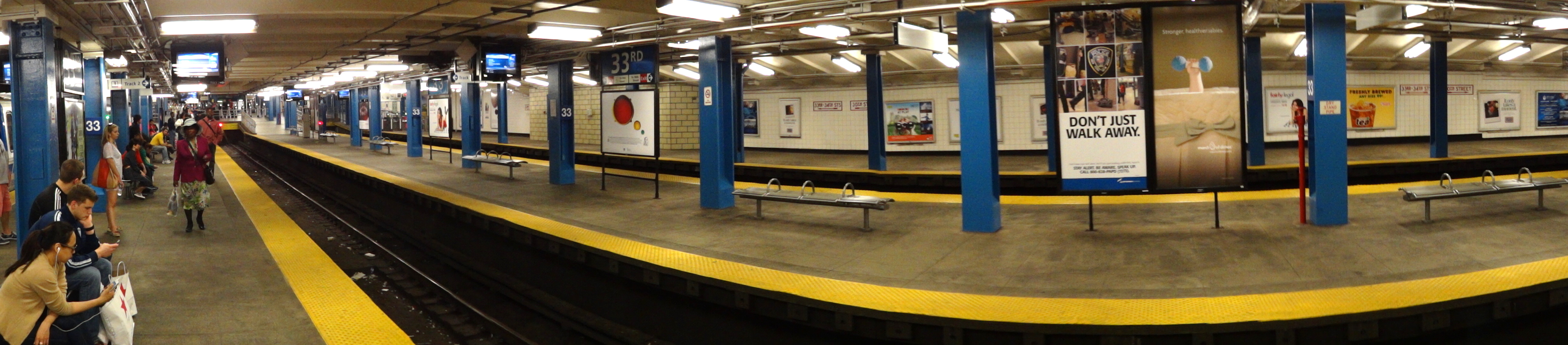
Panoramic view of the 33rd Street station

== Fares ==
The Port Authority charges a single flat fee to ride the PATH system, regardless of distance traveled. As of May 4, 2026, single-ride fares and two-trip tickets charge $3.25 per trip; 10-trip, 20-trip, and 40-trip cards charge $3.10 per trip; a single-day unlimited, $12.50; a seven-day unlimited, $42.75; and a 30-day unlimited, $131.50. A half-fare senior TAPP card costs $1.60 per trip. Since June 2025, disabled riders have also been allowed to apply for half-fare tickets.

Single ride tickets are valid for two hours from time of purchase. While some PATH stations are adjacent to or connected to New York City Subway, Newark Light Rail, Hudson-Bergen Light Rail, and NJ Transit commuter rail stations, there are no free transfers between these different, independently run transit systems. PATH began testing out a new contactless payment system called TAPP, similar to MTA's OMNY system, at some stations in December 2023. TAPP readers accept TAPP cards, debit and credit cards, and digital wallets, but not OMNY cards.

=== History of fares ===
==== Tier-based fares ====
The H&M used a tier-based fare system where a different fare was paid based on where the passenger was traveling. For instance, prior to September 1961, an interstate fare to or from all stations except Newark Penn Station was 25 cents, while an intrastate fare was 15 cents. That month, the interstate fare was increased to 30 cents, and the intrastate fare to 20 cents. A fare to or from Newark Penn, regardless of the origin or destination point, was 40 cents because the station's operations were shared with the Pennsylvania Railroad at the time. Under Port Authority operation, the PATH fare to and from Newark was lowered in 1966, standardizing the interstate fare to 30 cents. The intrastate fare of 15 cents was doubled in 1970, resulting in a flat rate for the entire system.

==== Tokens ====
PATH fares were paid with brass tokens starting in 1965. The Port Authority ordered 1 million tokens in 1962 and bought a half-million more in 1967. The Port Authority discontinued the sale of tokens in 1971 as a cost-cutting measure, since it cost $900,000 a year to maintain the token fare system. The agency replaced the turnstiles in its stations with new ones that accepted the 30-cent fare in exact change.

==== QuickCards ====
A paper ticket called the QuickCard, introduced in June 1990, was valid only on the PATH system. It stored fare information on a magnetic stripe.

The QuickCard was replaced by the SmartLink card in 2008 as sales were phased out across the system and at NJ Transit ticket machines. By late 2008, PATH had deactivated all turnstiles that accepted cash; they continued to accept the various cards.

The QuickCard was replaced by SmartLink Gray, a non-refillable, disposable version of the SmartLink card. This card was sold at selected newsstand vendors and was available in 10–, 20– and 40–trip increments. Unlike regular SmartLink cards, SmartLink Gray cards had expiration dates. SmartLink Gray was itself discontinued in January 2016.

==== SmartLink ====
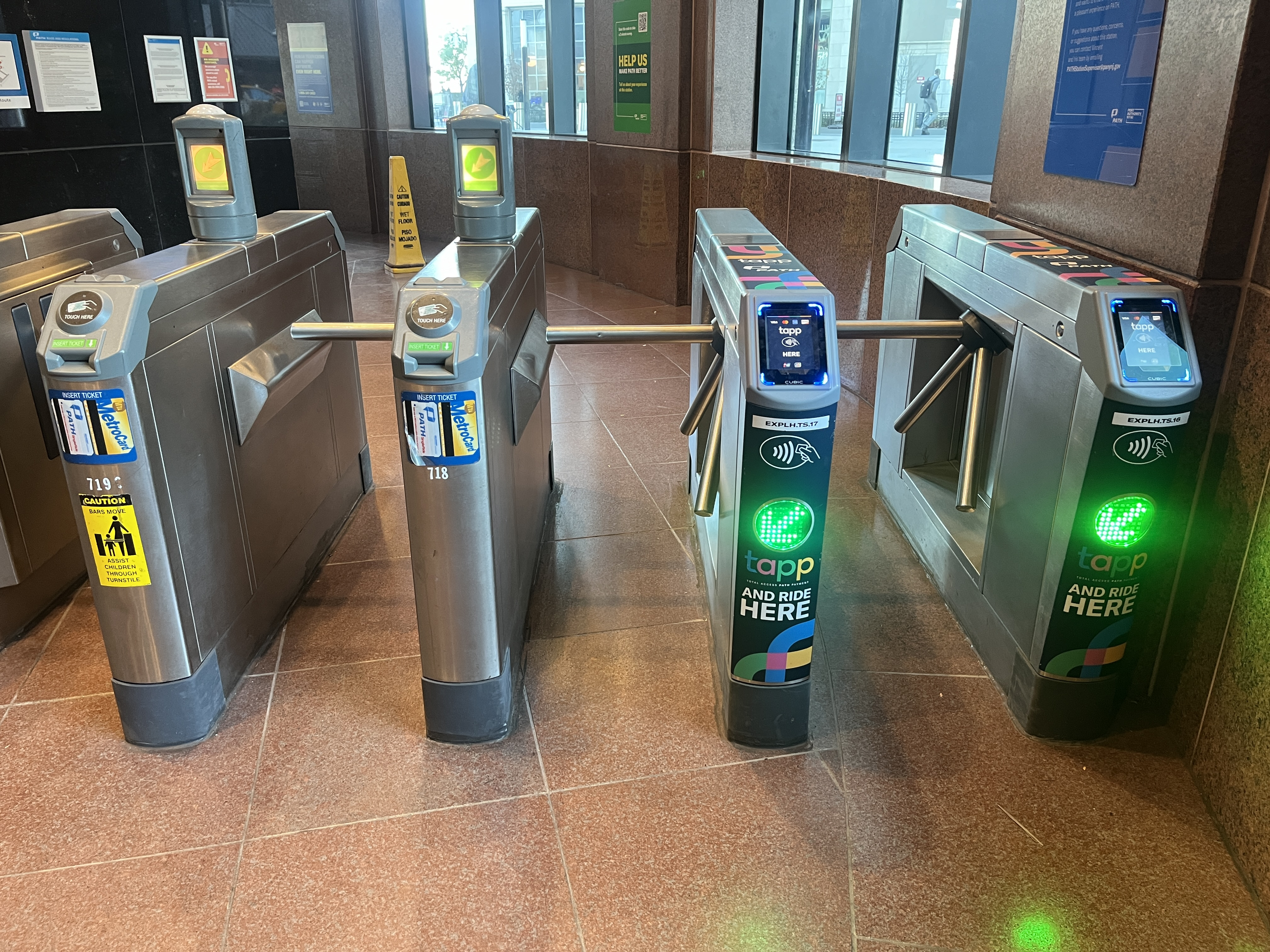
SmartLink (left) and TAPP (right) turnstiles at the Exchange Place station

Prior to the implementation of TAPP in 2023, PATH's official method of fare payment was a smart card known as SmartLink. The SmartLink was developed at a cost of $73 million, and initially was intended as a regional smart card that could be deployed on transit systems throughout the New York metropolitan area. It was first made available in July 2007 at the World Trade Center. The SmartLink can be connected to an online web account system allowing a cardholder to register the card and monitor its usage; it allows for an automatic replenishment system linked to a credit card account, wherein the card balance is automatically refilled when five trips remain (for multiple-trip cards) or five days (for unlimited-ride cards). On May 4, 2026, sales of single-ride SmartLinks were discontinued and replaced with paper tickets, while multi-trip passes and unlimited passes were sold at TAPP vending machines instead. Acceptance of SmartLinks was discontinued entirely on September 1, 2026.

==== MetroCard ====
PATH fare payment could also be made using single-ride, two-trip, and pay-per-ride MetroCards, formerly the standard farecard of New York's Metropolitan Transportation Authority (MTA). The MetroCard is a magnetic stripe card, like the QuickCard. PATH riders paying their fare using MetroCard insert the card into a slot at the front of the turnstile, which reads the card and presents the MetroCard to the rider at a slot on the top of the same turnstile. Other types of MetroCards, including unlimited-ride MetroCards, are not accepted on PATH.

Plans for using the MetroCard on PATH date to 1996, when the Port Authority and MTA first considered a unified fare system. At the time, the MetroCard was still being rolled out on the MTA system, and more than 80% of PATH riders transferred to other modes of transportation at some point in their trip. In November 2003, the Port Authority announced that the MetroCard would be allowed for use on PATH starting the following year. The Port Authority started implementing the MetroCard on PATH in 2005, installing new fare collection turnstiles at all PATH stations. These turnstiles allowed passengers to pay their fare with a PATH QuickCard or an MTA Pay-Per-Ride MetroCard. MetroCard sales officially ended on December 31, 2025, although existing MetroCards could continue to be used until they expired; Acceptance of MetroCards was discontinued entirely on September 1, 2026.

MetroCard vending machines were located at all PATH stations. The machines used to sell Pay-Per-Ride MetroCards; allow riders to refill SmartLink cards; and sell Single Ride PATH tickets for use only on the PATH system. There are two types of MetroCard vending machines: large machines, which sell both TAPPLinks and accept cash, credit cards, and transit benefits cards; and small machines, which do not accept cash or sell PATH single-ride tickets but otherwise perform the same functions as the large vending machines. In 2010, PATH introduced a $4 two-trip card using the standard MetroCard form. All PATH stations, except for the uptown platforms at 14th and 23rd Streets, contain blue vending machines which sell this card. The front of the card is the standard MetroCard (gold and blue) but on the reverse, it has the text "PATH 2-Trip Card", "Valid for two (2) PATH trips only", and "No refills on this card". The user must dispose of the card after the trips are used up because the turnstiles do not keep (or capture) the card as was done with the discontinued QuickCard.

=== TAPP ===
In June 2019, the Port Authority announced it was in talks with the MTA to implement the new OMNY fare payment system on PATH. Under the announced plan, OMNY would be available to PATH riders by 2022, with both SmartLink and MetroCard being phased out by 2023. In November 2021, the Port Authority indicated that it would instead implement its own fare payment system—which looks and functions the same as OMNY, has lowercase branding, and is designed by Cubic Transportation Systems, which also designed OMNY. This fare system is named TAPP, short for Total Access PATH Payment. TAPP accepts debit and credit cards and phones for fare payment, but does not accept OMNY cards. By March 2024, TAPP-compatible turnstiles had been enabled at six stations. The rollout of TAPP at all New Jersey stations was completed by early May 2024 and was rolled out at all stations in New York later that month. In December 2025, TAPP machines and physical TAPP cards were introduced. From May 4, 2026, unlimited passes are available through TAPP instead of SmartLink, and multi-trip passes are sold at TAPP vending machines. As of September 1, 2026, TAPP is the only system in use.

== Rolling stock ==
=== Current roster ===
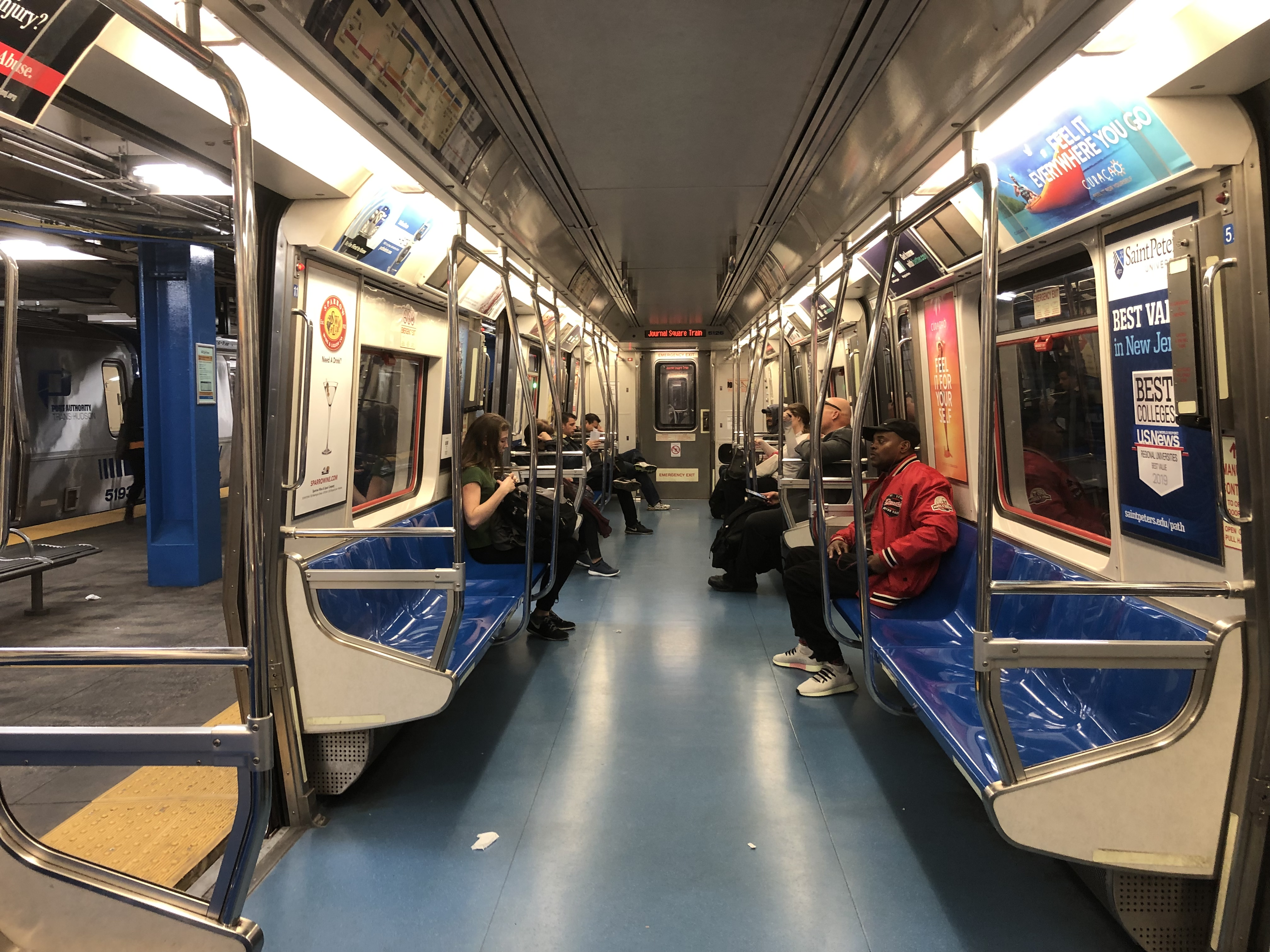
Interior of a PA5 car

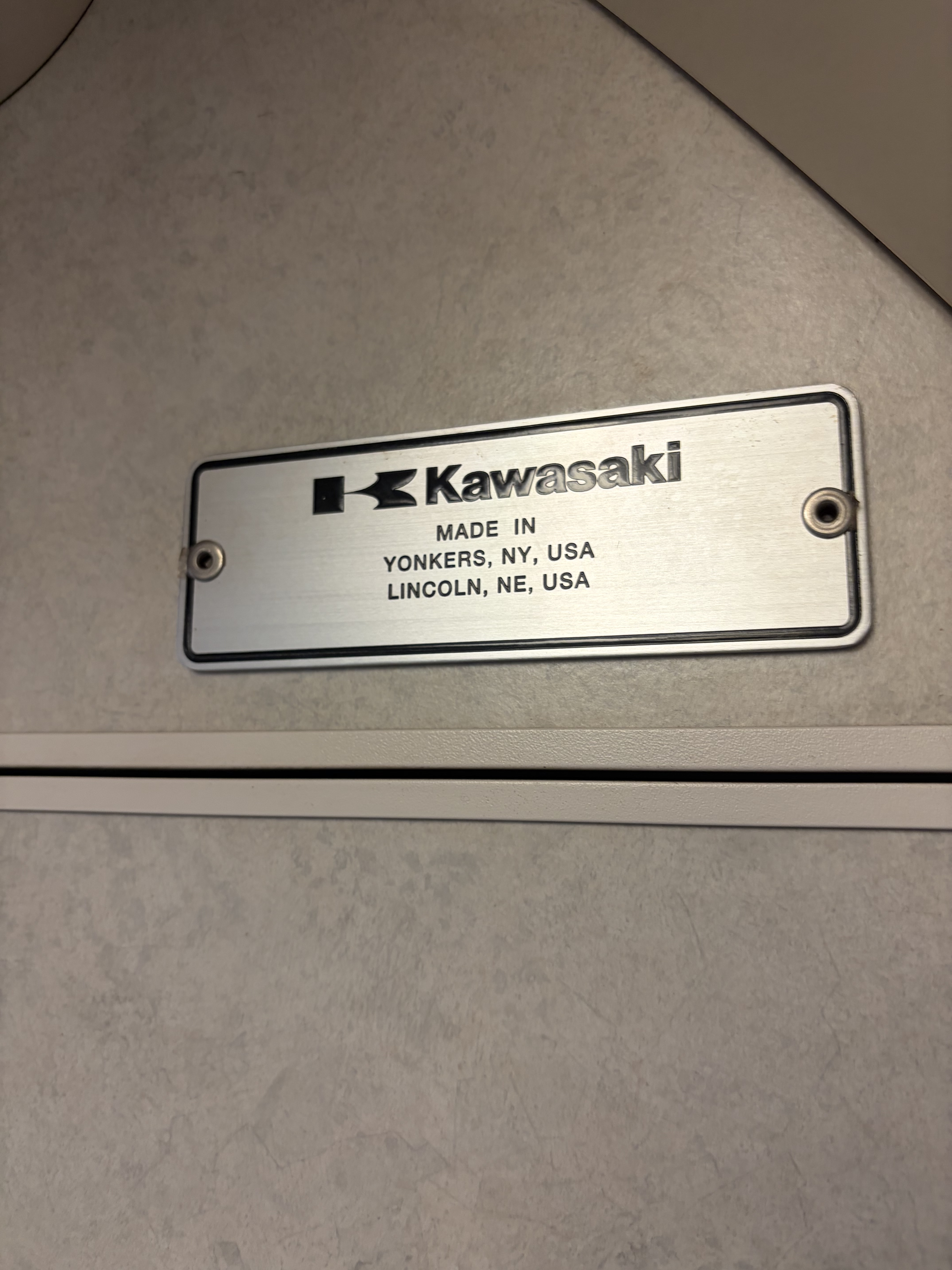
Builders plate of the PA5 cars

There is one model of rolling stock, the PA5, which had replaced all previous models by 2011. The cars are 51 feet (16 m) long by 9.2 feet (2.8 m) wide, a smaller loading gauge compared to similar vehicles in the US, due to the restricted structure gauge through the tunnels under the Hudson River. They can reach 55 mph (89 km/h) in regular service. Each car seats 35 passengers, in longitudinal "bucket" seating, and can fit a larger number of standees in each car. PA5 cars have stainless steel bodies and three doors on each side. LED displays above the windows (between the doors) display the destination of that particular train. The PA5 cars are coupled and linked into consists up to 8 cars long, with conductors' controls on all cars and engineers' cabs on the "A" (driving) cars; trains on the Newark–World Trade Center line will be lengthened to 10 cars as part of the line's 2010s upgrades.

In 2005, the Port Authority awarded a $499 million contract to Kawasaki to design and build 340 new PATH cars under the PA5 order to replace the system's entire existing fleet. With an average age of 42 years and some cars dating back as far as 1964, the fleet was the oldest of any operating heavy rail line in the United States. The Port Authority announced that the new cars would be updated versions of the MTA's R142A cars. The first of these new cars entered revenue service in 2009; all of them were delivered over the next two years. The Port Authority exercised a subsequent contract for 10 additional PA5 cars, bringing the total to 350.

As part of the fleet expansion program and signal system upgrade, the Port Authority had the option to order a total of 119 additional PA5 cars; 44 would be used to expand the NWK–WTC line to 10-car operation while the remaining 75 would be used to increase service frequencies after communication-based train control (CBTC) was implemented throughout the system by the end of 2018. In December 2017, the Port Authority exercised an option to buy 50 extra PA5 cars for $150 million, for an ultimate total of 400 PA5 cars. Subsequently, in July 2018, Kawasaki was awarded a $240 million contract to refurbish the 350 existing PA5 cars between 2018 and 2024. The contract also called for Kawasaki to build and deliver 72 new PA5 cars starting in 2021, for a total of 422 cars; the first of the additional PA5 cars arrived in September 2022. The new cars are being built by Kawasaki Heavy Industries in the U.S. at Lincoln, Nebraska and tested in Yonkers, New York. The 350 existing cars are being refurbished in Yonkers.

Since 1990, all PATH trains are stored and maintained at the Harrison Car Maintenance Facility in New Jersey, located east of the Harrison station. Another train storage yard (Waldo Yard) exists east of the Journal Square station. If the Newark Airport extension is built, a third train storage yard would be built at the airport.

Rolling stock	Year built	Builder	Car body	Car numbers	Image	Total built	Notes
PA5	2008–2011; 2022–2023	Kawasaki	Stainless steel	5600–5829 (A cars); 5100–5219; 5300–5371 (C cars)		340 base order 119 in fleet expansion option (72 in progress.)	"A" cars have cab units, "C" cars have no cabs Siemens SITRAC 3-phase AC IGBT-VVVF traction system, upgradable to CBTC signalling compatibility, 3 doors per side, prerecorded station announcements

=== Former roster ===
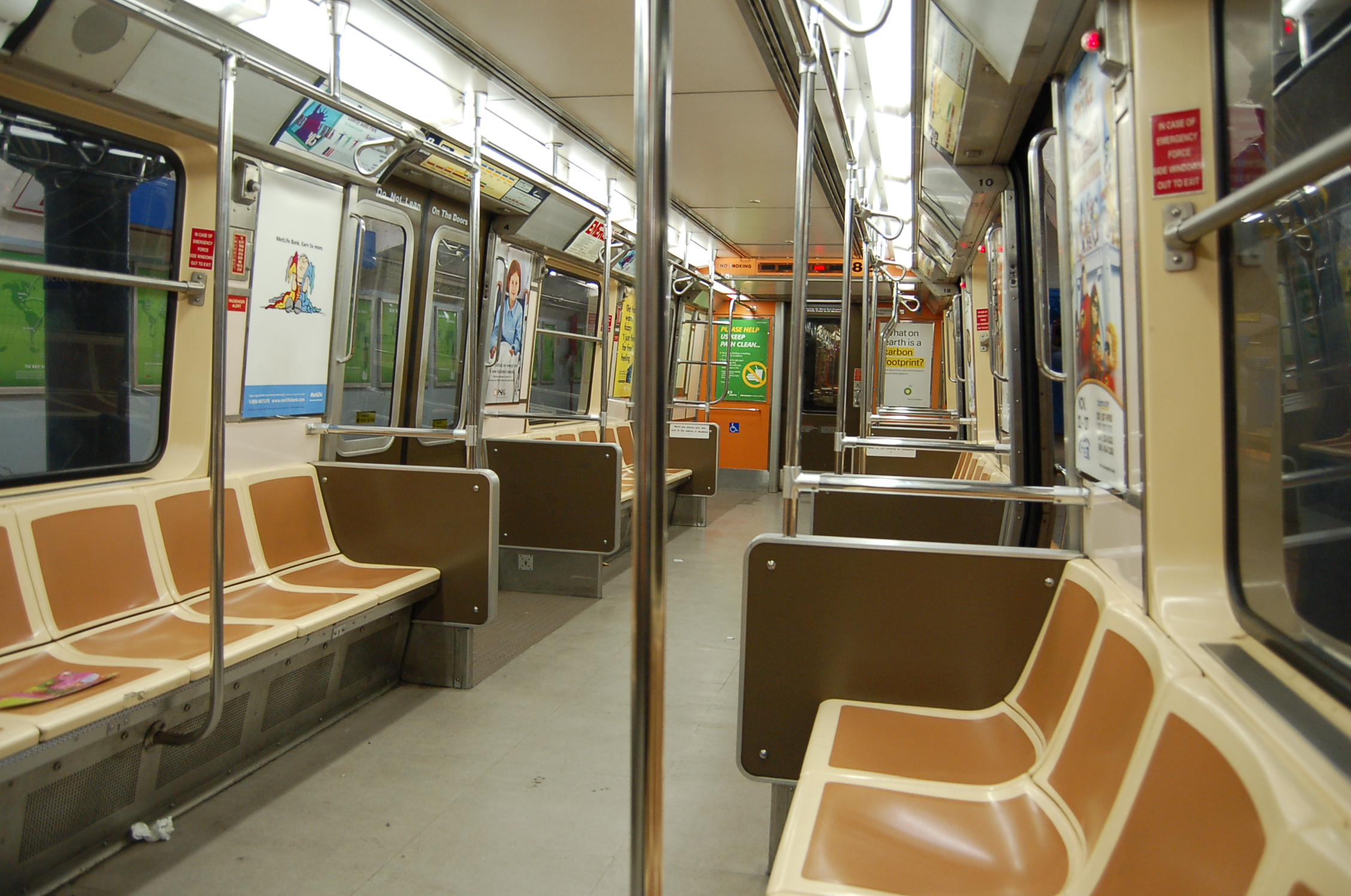
Interior of a PA-4 car

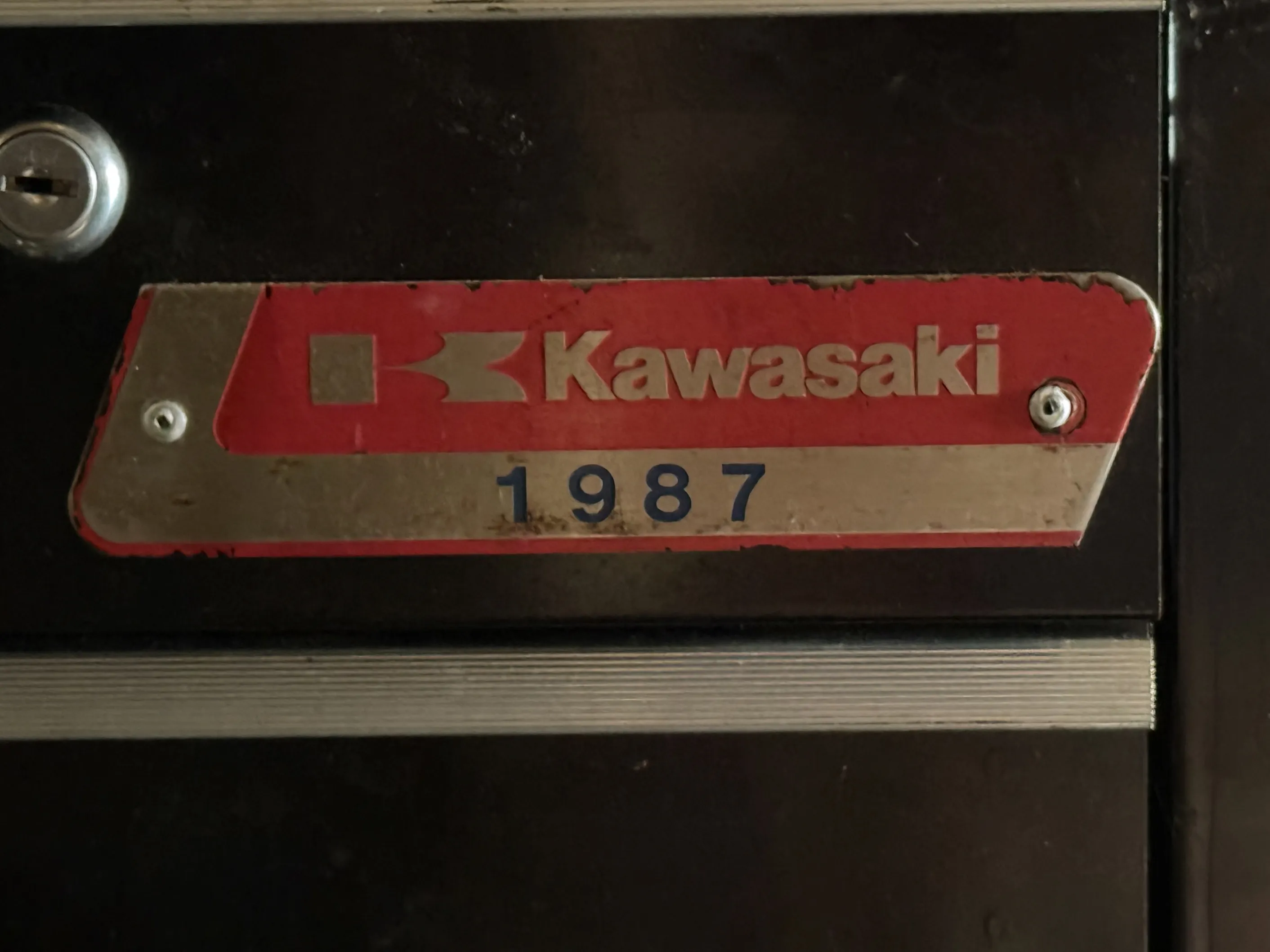
Builders plate of the PA-4 cars

Before the Port Authority takeover, the H&M system used rolling stock series that were given letters from A to J. All of these cars, except for the D and H series, were known as "black cars" for their color. There were a total of 325 cars in series A through J, of which 255 were black cars. The first 190 cars, in classes A through C, were ordered for the initial H&M service and delivered in 1909–1911. The cars, which were built in seven modular segments, measured 48.25 feet (14.71 m) long with a loading gauge of 8.83 feet (2.69 m) and a height of 12 feet (3.7 m), with longitudinal seating and three doors on each side. They were ordered to the narrow specifications of the Hudson Tubes, and were light enough that they could be tested on the Second Avenue elevated in Manhattan, which could only support lightweight trains.

Seventy-five cars in classes E through G were added in 1921–1923, allowing the H&M to lengthen all train consists to a uniform eight cars. Although classes E-G had similar exterior dimensions to classes A-C, the E-G series had higher capacity, were heavier, and had substantially different window designs compared to the A-C series. The last order of black cars, the 20 cars in series J, was delivered in 1928. Many of the black cars remained in service from their inception until the H&M's bankruptcy in 1954. By that time, they required considerable maintenance.

The PRR and H&M joint service comprised 40 cars in classes D and H, which were owned by the H&M, as well as 72 cars from the MP38 class, which were owned by the PRR. Sixty MP38s and 36 Class D cars were delivered in 1911, when the service first operated. In 1927, an additional 12 MP38 cars were ordered under the MP38A classification, as well as four Class H cars. As a result of the different manufacturers and the long duration between the two pairs of orders, the Class D and MP38 cars' designs were noticeably different from the Class H and MP38A cars' designs. The red cars were branded with the names of both companies to signify the partnership. Known collectively as the "red cars" for their PRR-derived paint scheme, they suffered from corrosion and design defects, and were unusable by 1954. All of the red and black car series were designed to be operationally compatible.

The MP52 and K-class, which replaced the D-class and the 60 MP38s ordered in 1911, comprised an order of 50 cars. The 30 MP52s and 20 K-classes were purchased by the PRR and H&M respectively and delivered in 1958 in order to save money on maintenance.

After the Port Authority took over operation of the H&M Railroad in 1962, it started ordering new rolling stock to replace the old H&M cars. The St. Louis Car Company built 162 PA1 cars in 1964–1965. St. Louis also built the PA2, a supplementary order of 44 cars, in 1966–1967. Hawker Siddeley built 46 PA3 cars in 1972. The 95 PA4s were built by Kawasaki Heavy Industries in 1986–1987, replacing the K-class and MP52 series.

PA1, PA2, and PA3 cars had painted aluminum bodies, and two doors on each side. Back-lit panels above the doors displayed the destination of that particular train: HOB for Hoboken, JSQ for Journal Square, NWK for Newark, 33 for 33rd Street, and WTC for World Trade Center. In the mid-1980s, Kawasaki overhauled 248 of the 252 PA1-PA3 cars at their factory in Yonkers, New York, and repainted them white to match the PA4 cars then being delivered. PA4 cars had stainless steel bodies, and three doors on each side. Back-lit displays above the windows (between the doors) displayed the destination of that particular train. All four series were designed to be operationally compatible. Although all four orders contained "A" cars with cabs at one end, the PA1 and PA2 orders also contained some "C" cars. Trains could comprise three to eight cars, but in order to operate, there had to be an even number of "A" cars in the consist, including one "A" car at each end. All PA1-PA4 equipment was retired from passenger service by 2011.

Rolling stock	Year built	Year retired	Builder	Car body	Car numbers	Image	Total built	Notes
A	1908	1955	Pressed Steel and American Car & Foundry	painted steel (black)	200–249	N/A	50	Pressed Steel built 10 cars numbered 200–209.; American Car & Foundry built the remaining 40 cars numbered 210–249.
B	1909	1964–1967	Pressed Steel	painted steel (black)	250–339	N/A	90	256 at National Museum of Transportation.; Car 318 was wrecked at 33rd Street on January 16, 1931.
C	1910	1964–1967	American Car & Foundry	painted steel (black)	340–389	N/A	50	
D	1911	1958	Pressed Steel	painted steel (red)	701–736	N/A	36	"Red cars" used in the H&M/PRR joint service and owned by the H&M.; Car 728 was wrecked at Hudson Terminal on August 23, 1937.
MP38	1911	1964–1967	Pressed Steel	painted steel (red)	1901–1960	N/A	60	"Red cars" used in the H&M/PRR joint service and owned by the PRR.
E	1921	1966–1967	American Car & Foundry	painted steel (black)	401–425	N/A	25	
F	1922	1966–1967	American Car & Foundry	painted steel (black)	426–450	N/A	25	
G	1923	1966–1967	American Car & Foundry	painted steel (black)	451–475	N/A	25	
H	1927	1966–1967	American Car & Foundry	painted steel (red)	801–804	N/A	4	"Red cars" used in the H&M/PRR joint service and owned by the H&M.
MP38A	1927	1966–1967	American Car & Foundry	painted steel (red)	1961–1972	N/A	12	"Red cars" used in the H&M/PRR joint service and owned by the PRR.
J	1928	1966–1967	American Car & Foundry	painted steel (black)	501–520	N/A	20	503 at Shore Line Trolley Museum.
MP52	1958	1987	St. Louis Car Company	painted aluminum and steel	1200–1229		30	Replaced the D series.; Owned by PRR and used primarily in H&M/PRR joint service, later PATH service.
K	1958	1987	St. Louis Car Company	painted aluminum and steel	1230–1249		20	Replaced the D series.; Owned by H&M and used primarily in H&M/PRR joint service, later PATH service.; First cars in the H&M/PRR/PATH system to feature air-conditioning.
PA1	1964–1965	2009–2011	St. Louis Car Company	painted aluminum	100–151 ("C" cars); 600–709 ("A" cars)		162 (110 cab units, 52 trailers)	Replaced most B–J class and MP38 cars.; "A" cars have cab units, "C" cars-trailers have no cabs, 2 doors per side.; 143 (trailer) at Trolley Museum of New York (Kingston).; Cars 139 and 612 wrecked on September 11, 2001 (see below).
PA2	1966–1967	2009–2011	St. Louis Car Company	painted aluminum	152–181 ("C" cars); 710–723 ("A" cars)	N/A	44 (14 cab units, 30 trailers)	Replaced all remaining B–J class and MP38 cars.; "A" cars have cab units, "C" cars-trailers have no cabs, 2 doors per side.; Car 160 wrecked on September 11, 2001 (see below).
PA3	1972	2009–2011	Hawker Siddeley Canada	painted aluminum	724–769	N/A	46	All are cab units, 2 doors per side.; 745 at Shore Line Trolley Museum (BERA).; Car 750 wrecked on September 11, 2001 (see below).
PA4	1986–1987	2009–2011	Kawasaki	Stainless steel	800–894		95	Replaced K class and MP52 series.; All are cab units, 3 doors per side.; Car 845 wrecked on September 11, 2001 (see below).; Most in work service.

A seven-car PATH train was left under the World Trade Center after September 11, 2001; though five of the cars were destroyed, cars 745 and 143 were not positioned directly beneath the tower and survived the collapse relatively intact. These two cars were cleaned and placed in storage while the remains of the rest of the train had been stripped of usable parts and scrapped. The cars were intended to be displayed in the National September 11 Memorial & Museum. However, they were deemed too large to be displayed there; as a result, car 745 was instead donated to the Shore Line Trolley Museum, while car 143 was donated to the Trolley Museum of New York.

== FRA railroad status ==
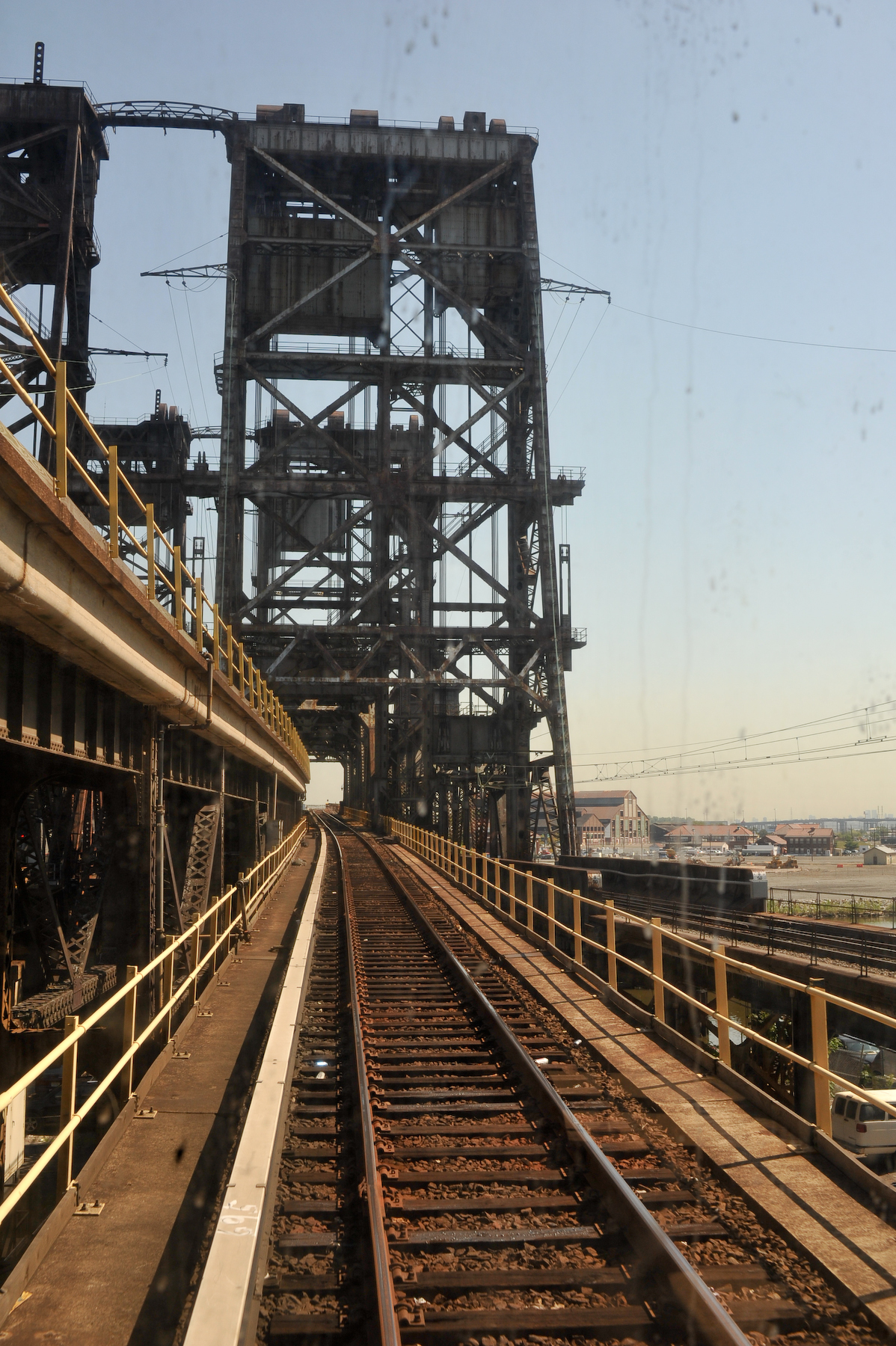
View of the Dock Bridge, which is used by PATH but owned by Amtrak

While PATH operates as a heavy rail rapid transit system, it is legally a commuter railroad under the jurisdiction of the FRA, which oversees railroads that are part of the national rail network. PATH's predecessor, the H&M, used to share trackage with the Pennsylvania Railroad between the Hudson interlocking near Harrison and Journal Square. The line also connected to the Northeast Corridor near Harrison station and also near Hudson tower. Though there is no longer any through-running of mainline intercity trains into PATH tunnels, FRA regulations still apply to PATH because PATH's right-of-way between Newark and Jersey City is very close to the Northeast Corridor. PATH also shares the Dock Bridge near Newark Penn Station with Amtrak and NJ Transit.

Although PATH operates under several grandfather waivers, it still must meet more stringent requirements than other American rapid transit systems, such as the proper fitting of grab irons to all PATH rolling stock, installation of PTC, and compliance with the federal railroad hours of service regulations. Additionally, all PATH train operators must be federally certified locomotive engineers, trains must have conductors on board, and the agency must conduct more detailed safety inspections than other rapid transit systems. These requirements increase PATH's per-hour operating costs relative to other rapid transit systems in the New York City and Philadelphia areas. For instance, in 2012, it was three times more expensive to operate per hour than the New York City Subway despite having only a fraction of the latter system's length and ridership. The PANYNJ has sought to switch its regulator to the Federal Transit Administration, which oversees rapid transit, but the FRA has insisted that safety concerns require PATH to remain under its purview. Alternatively, the Port Authority has considered transferring PATH to NJ Transit.

== Media and popular culture ==
PATH management has two principal passenger outreach initiatives: the "PATHways" newsletter, distributed for free at terminals, as well as the Patron Advisory Committee. Other passenger outreach initiatives include "PATHursday", allowing passengers to provide enhancing service suggestions. Similarly, the "PATH Riders' Council" allows feedback about their system design, service, and decision-making. PATH has offered various "Community Poster Competitions" with schools, "Transit Lines Poetry Stories" featuring poet pieces tied with New York and New Jersey region, and "Arts In Transit" and "PATH Performs!" displaying local artists' work and performances.

=== Media restrictions ===
As of December 2015, PATH regulations state that all photography, filmmaking, videotaping, or creations of drawings or other visual depictions within the PATH system is prohibited without a permit and supervision by a PATH representative. According to the rules, photographers, filmmakers, and other individuals must obtain permits through an application process. Although it has been suggested that the restriction was put in place due to terrorism concerns, the restriction predates the September 11 attacks and the 1993 World Trade Center bombing.

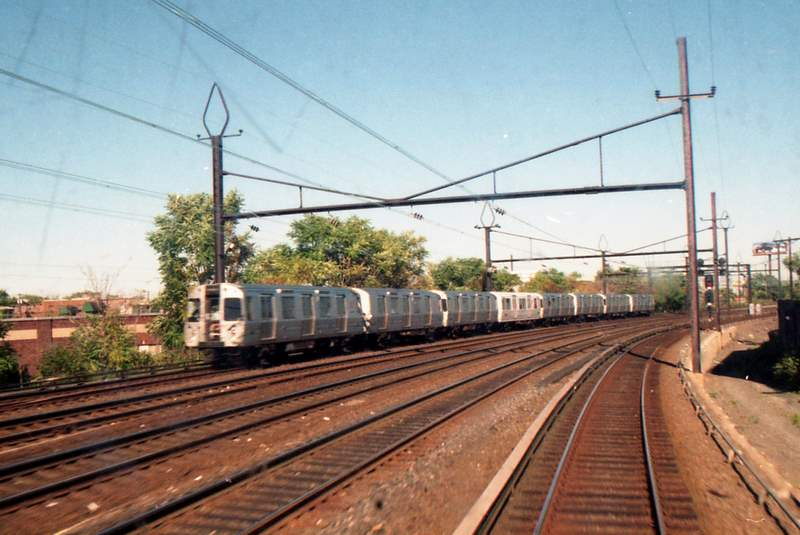
View from the front of a Newark-bound train, 1997

According to New Jersey newspaper Hudson Reporter, this ban excludes members of the general public who want to take pictures, and the photography and filmography ban only applies for commercial or professional purposes. The general public is allowed to take pictures of PATH stations and all other Port Authority facilities except in secure and off-limits areas. There have been decisions from the United States Supreme Court stating that casual photography is covered by the First Amendment; the case law is mixed. Under the law, PATH employees may not force a casual photographer to destroy or surrender their film or images, but confiscations and arrests have occurred as well as forced deletion. Litigation following such confiscations or arrests have generally, but not always, resulted in charges being dropped and/or damages awarded.

=== Tunnel decoration ===
On trains bound for Newark or Hoboken from World Trade Center, a short, zoetrope-like advertisement was formerly visible in the tunnel before entering Exchange Place. There was another similar advertisement, visible from 33rd Street-bound trains between 14th and 23rd Streets near the abandoned 19th Street station.

Every year, around Thanksgiving, PATH employees light a decorated Christmas tree at the switching station adjacent to the tunnel used by trains entering the Pavonia/Newport station. This tradition started in the 1950s when a signal operator hung a string of Christmas lights in the tunnel. While PATH officials were initially concerned about putting up decorations in the tunnel, they later acquiesced and the tradition continued. After the September 11 attacks, a backlit U.S. flag was put up beside the tree as a tribute to the victims.

=== In popular culture ===
PATH trains and stations have occasionally been the setting for music videos, commercials, movies, and TV programs. For instance, the White Stripes's video for "The Hardest Button to Button" was filmed at 33rd Street. Additionally, the premiere for season 19 of Law & Order: Special Victims Unit was filmed in the World Trade Center station. The PATH system is also often used as a stand-in for the New York City Subway, as in John Wick: Chapter 2 where it was portrayed as a "Broad Street bound Z train".

== Major incidents ==
=== Train collisions ===
- On August 31, 1922, two H&M trains collided in heavy fog at Manhattan Transfer, injuring 50 people, eight of them seriously.
- On July 22, 1923, another collision near Manhattan Transfer killed one person and injured 15 others.
- On January 16, 1931, a seven-car H&M train derailed a switch and collided with a wall at 33rd Street, injuring 19 passengers.
- On August 22, 1937, a 5-car H&M train crashed into a wall at Hudson Terminal, injuring 33 passengers.
- On November 26, 1938, 22 passengers were injured when an H&M train sideswiped a PRR engine in Kearny, east of the former Manhattan Transfer station.
- On April 26, 1942, a six-car H&M train derailed at Exchange Place. Five people were killed and 222 more were injured. A subsequent investigation found that the motorman was intoxicated.
- On December 17, 1945, a seven-car H&M train collided with a steel barrier on the Dock Bridge west of Harrison, killing the motorman and injuring 67 passengers.
- On December 13, 1958, an H&M train rear-ended another one at Journal Square, injuring 30 passengers, none seriously.
- On October 16, 1962, 26 people were injured in a crash between two H&M trains at Hudson Terminal.
- On July 23, 1963, a PATH train collided with a PRR engine east of Harrison, killing two passengers and injuring 28 more.
- On January 11, 1968, a rear-end accident at Journal Square injured 100 of the approximately 200 combined passengers on the two trains, 25 of them seriously.
- On October 21, 2009, a PATH train crashed into a bumper block at the end of the platform at 33rd Street. Approximately 13 of the 450 people on board suffered minor injuries; two crew members and five passengers were hospitalized. An investigation by the Port Authority determined that the cause was human error.
- On May 8, 2011, a PATH train crashed into a bumper block at Hoboken Terminal, injuring 34 people; the NTSB said the train engineer failed to control the speed of the train as it entered the station.
- On October 10, 2019, a PATH train derailed and collided with the platform at Newark Penn Station. No one was on the train at the time.
- On July 12, 2025, a PATH train derailed at the Hoboken station interlocking. The Port Authority said that the likely cause of the derailment was a guard rail on the then recently installed interlocking.

=== Other incidents ===
- A train near Exchange Place caught fire on June 3, 1982, injuring 28 people.
- Part of the ceiling at Journal Square fell onto the platform on August 8, 1983, killing two and injuring 12. A subsequent investigation found that the ceiling collapse had occurred due to the station's poor design, bad supervision procedures during construction, and inadequate maintenance.
- In July 2006, an alleged plot to detonate explosives in the Downtown Hudson Tubes (initially said to be a plot to bomb the Holland Tunnel) was uncovered by the FBI. According to officials, this plan was unsound due to the strength of both tunnels, as well as various restrictions in both the Holland Tunnel and the PATH system. Three of the eight planners were arrested.
- On January 7, 2013, an escalator at Exchange Place suddenly reversed itself, resulting in five injuries. After the incident, all of the escalators in the PATH system were inspected.
- On the morning of August 4, 2025, a train caught fire at the Newport station.

== See also ==
- Transportation in New Jersey
- Transportation in New York City
- List of metro systems
- PATCO Speedline, a similar rapid transit/commuter line connecting South Jersey to Philadelphia

== Bibliography ==
- Brennan, Joseph. "Abandoned stations".
- Carleton, Paul (1990). The Hudson & Manhattan Railroad Revisited. D. Carleton Railbooks.
