= Henderson v. United States (1950) =

- Supreme Court of the United States

Argued April 3, 1950 Decided June 5, 1950
- Full case name: Henderson v. United States et al
- Citations: 339 U.S. 816 (more) 70 S. Ct. 843; 94 L. Ed. 2d 1302; 1950 U.S. LEXIS 2488

Case history
- Prior: On appeal from the United States District Court for the District of Maryland

Holding
- The Interstate Commerce Act makes it unlawful for a railroad in interstate commerce to subject any particular person to any undue or unreasonable prejudice or disadvantage in any respect whatsoever.

Court membership
- Chief Justice Fred M. Vinson Associate Justices Hugo Black · Stanley F. Reed; Felix Frankfurter · William O. Douglas; Robert H. Jackson · Harold H. Burton; Tom C. Clark · Sherman Minton

Case opinions
- Majority: Burton, joined by Vinson, Black, Reed, Frankfurter, Jackson, Minton
- Concurrence: Douglas
- Clark took no part in the consideration or decision of the case.

Laws applied
- Interstate Commerce Act 3 (1)

Henderson v. United States, 339 U.S. 816 (1950), was a landmark United States Supreme Court decision in the jurisprudence of the United States that abolished segregation in railroad dining cars with an 8-0 ruling.

== The decision ==
On May 17, 1942, Elmer W. Henderson, an African-American passenger, was travelling first-class on the Southern Railway from Washington to Atlanta en route to Birmingham in the course of his duties as an employee of the United States.

At about 5:30 pm, while the train was in Virginia, the first call to dinner was announced and he went promptly to the dining car. Under practices then in effect, the two end tables nearest the kitchen were to be reserved initially for African Americans with curtains drawn between them and the rest of the car. If the other tables were occupied before any African-American passengers presented themselves at the diner then those two tables were made available for white passengers.

As the tables were partly occupied by white passengers (with at least one seat at them unoccupied) the dining-car steward declined to seat the passenger in the dining car, offering instead to serve him at his Pullman seat. The passenger declined and the steward agreed to send him word when space was available. No word was sent and he was not served, although he twice returned to the diner before it was detached at 9 pm.

The passenger filed a complaint with the Interstate Commerce Commission in October 1942, alleging this conduct violated provisions of the Interstate Commerce Act. While the Commission acknowledged that he had been subjected to undue and unreasonable prejudice and disadvantage, it dismissed the occurrence as a casual incident brought about by the bad judgment of an employee and refused to enter an order as to future practices.

The United States District Court for the District of Maryland disagreed; the railroad's general practice, as evidenced by its stated policies in effect on August 6, 1942, was in violation of the Interstate Commerce Act.

The US Supreme Court did not rule on the constitutionality of "separate but equal" in this instance but did find that the railroad had failed to provide the passenger with the same level of service provided to a white passenger with the same class of ticket, a violation of principles already established in Mitchell v. United States (1941).

== Analysis ==
The Court refused to rule on the separate but equal doctrine, but the mandate of the Court eliminated the reserved tables and the curtain.

== See also ==
- Southern Railway Co. v. United States
- List of United States Supreme Court cases, volume 339
