= Southern Railway Co. v. United States =

Southern Railway Company v. United States
- Supreme Court of the United States

Argued March 9–10, 1911 Decided October 30, 1911
- Full case name: Southern Railway Company, Plaintiff in Error, v. United States
- Citations: 222 U.S. 20 (more) 32 S. Ct. 2; 56 L. Ed. 72; 1911 U.S. LEXIS 1875

Holding
- The Court held that under the Commerce Clause, the U.S. Congress can regulate safety on intrastate rail traffic because there is a close and substantial connection to interstate traffic.

Court membership
- Chief Justice Edward D. White Associate Justices Joseph McKenna · Oliver W. Holmes Jr. William R. Day · Horace H. Lurton; Charles E. Hughes · Willis Van Devanter; Joseph R. Lamar

Case opinion
- Majority: Van Devanter, joined by Unanimous

Laws applied
- Safety Appliance Act, Commerce Clause

Southern Railway Company v. United States, 222 U.S. 20 (1911), was a decision by the United States Supreme Court which held that under the Commerce Clause, the U.S. Congress can regulate safety on intrastate rail traffic because there is a close and substantial connection to interstate traffic.

== Background ==
Congress required all train cars to be equipped with couplers as a safety measure. Southern Railway argued that the requirement applied only to train cars crossing state lines, not to train cars that operated inside one state.

The Safety Appliance Act of March 2, 1893, 27 Stat. 531, c. 196:

...imposed upon every carrier "engaged in interstate commerce by railroad" the duty of equipping all trains, locomotives, and cars used on its line of railroad in moving interstate traffic, with designated appliances calculated to promote the safety of that traffic...

== Decision ==
The Commerce Clause is plenary to protect persons and property moving in interstate commerce from all danger. No matter the source or destination, Congress may require all vehicles moving on lanes of interstate commerce to be so equipped with safety devices to avoid danger to persons and property in interstate commerce.

== See also ==
- Henderson v. United States
- List of United States Supreme Court cases, volume 222
