= Railroad Safety Appliance Act =

1893 US federal railway safety law

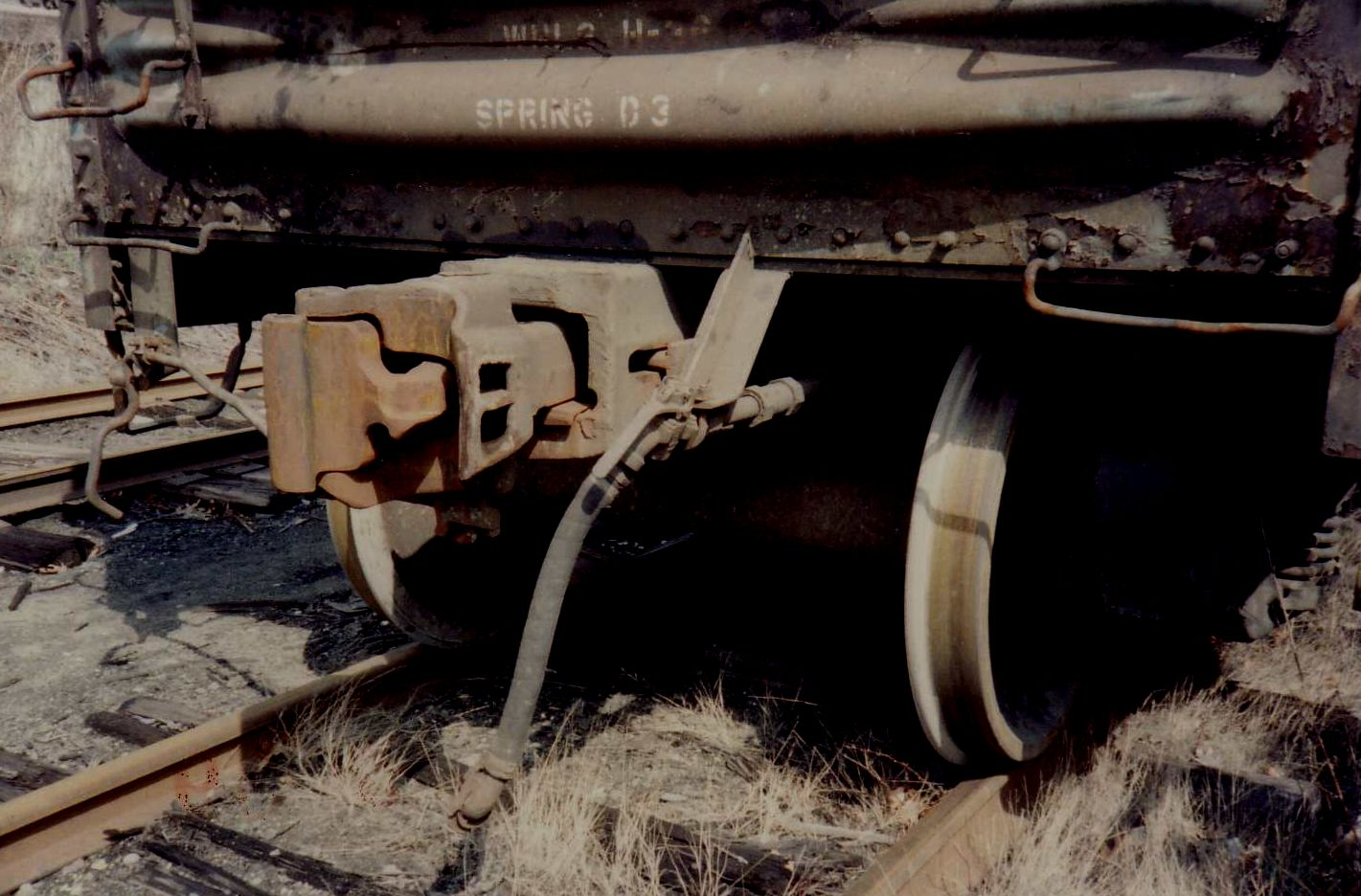
Modern US boxcar showing automatic coupler, air brake hose and grab bars, all mandated by the Safety Appliance Act. The bent rod at far left allows the coupler to be disengaged by a worker standing safely at the side of the car, per Section 2 of the Act.

The Safety Appliance Act is a United States federal law that made air brakes and automatic couplers mandatory on all trains in the United States. It was enacted on March 2, 1893, and took effect in 1900, after a seven-year grace period. The act is credited with a sharp drop in accidents on American railroads in the early 20th century.

== Background ==
After the Civil War, railroads expanded rapidly throughout the United States. The increased traffic was accompanied by an increase in accidents among railroad personnel, especially brakemen. Many accidents were associated with coupling and uncoupling of railroad cars, and particularly with the use of link-and-pin couplers, which were widely used then. The operation of hand brakes was also very hazardous. The rise in accidents led to calls for safety legislation, as early as the 1870s. In the 1880s, on-the-job deaths of railroad workers were second only to those of coal miners. Through that decade, several state legislatures enacted safety laws. However, the specific requirements varied among the states, making implementation difficult for interstate rail carriers, and Congress passed the Safety Appliance Act in 1893 to provide a uniform standard. Former Iowa railroad commissioner Lorenzo Coffin doggedly lobbied for the act almost singlehandedly for six years before Congress finally passed the bill in 1893.

== 1893 act ==
The original act was entitled, "An Act to Promote the Safety of Employees and Travelers upon Railroads by Compelling Common Carriers Engaged in Interstate Commerce to Equip Their Cars with Automatic Couplers and Continuous Brakes and Their Locomotives with Driving-wheel Brakes, and for Other Purposes." Its first section makes it unlawful, among other things, for a railroad company engaged in interstate commerce to run any train without having a sufficient number of the cars so equipped with train brakes (such as air brakes) that the engineer on the locomotive can control the speed of the train without requiring brakemen to use a hand brake for that purpose.

The second section prohibits such a carrier from hauling or using on its line in moving interstate traffic any car not equipped with couplers which can be coupled and uncoupled automatically "without the necessity of men going between the ends of the cars", and the fourth section forbids the use in interstate commerce of any car not provided with secure grab irons or hand holds on the ends and sides of the car "for greater security to men in coupling and uncoupling cars". The sixth section imposes for every violation of the act a penalty of $100.

== Summary of sections ==
=== Section 1 ===
Need safety checks on locomotive and a sufficient number of cars. Starting on January 1, 1898, unlawful for a common carrier used for interstate commerce to use locomotive engine not equipped with a power driving-wheel brake and appliances for operating the train-brake system. Also need sufficient number of cars equipped with power or train brakes so engineer in the locomotive can control its speed without requiring a brakeman to use a common hand brake to do so.

=== Section 2 ===
Need automatic couplers that can be uncoupled without man going between. On January 1, 1898, it will be unlawful for a common carrier used for interstate commerce to haul or permit to be hauled any car that is not equipped with couplers coupling automatically by impact and which can be uncoupled without a man going between the ends of the cars.

=== Section 3 ===
Can't receive cars not equipped. When any person, firm, company, or corporation engaged in interstate commerce by railroad has equipped a sufficient number of cars to be in compliance with Section 1, he/it may refuse to receive the connecting lines of road or shippers of any cars not equipped in such a manner.

=== Section 4 ===
Secure grab irons. After July 1, 1895, unless Interstate Commerce Commission says otherwise, unlawful for RR company to use any car in interstate commerce that doesn't have secure grab irons or handholds in the ends and sides of each car (more secure for men who couple and uncouple cars.)

=== Section 5 ===
Setting standards. Within 90 days of passage of act, the American Railway Association is authorized to set standard height of drawbars for freight cars and fix maximum variation from such standard heights to be allowed between drawbars of empty and loaded cars. Will submit these standards to the Interstate Commerce Commission, which will inform the carriers. If ARA fails to set standard, ICC will do so before July 1, 1894. After July 1, 1895, no cars can be used that don't comply.

=== Section 6 ===
If violate provision. Any common carrier in violation of any provisions will be liable to pay a penalty of $100 for every violation, to be recovered in federal court.

=== Section 7 ===
Can extend time within which carriers need to comply with this act. ICC can extend period from time to time with a full hearing and for good reason.

=== Section 8 ===
If someone working for a non-compliant train is injured. An employee injured in a train that is not in compliance with this act will not need to bear the risk occasioned even if he knew that it was unlawful to do things that way and still continued working for the employer.

== Amendments ==
The original law was amended by a subsequent act in 1903, whose first section provides that the requirements of the original act respecting train brakes, automatic couplers, and grab irons shall be held to apply to all trains and cars used on any railroad engaged in interstate commerce, unless a minor exception were satisfied. By its second section this act requires that not less than 50 percent of the cars in a train shall have their train brakes used and operated by the engineer on the locomotive, and confers upon the Interstate Commerce Commission (ICC) the authority to increase this minimum percentage to the end that the objects intended may be more fully accomplished. By an order promulgated June 6, 1910, the Commission increased the minimum number of cars whose train brakes must be under the engineer's control to 85 percent.

A 1910 legislative amendment required additional equipment, including ladders, sill steps, and hand brakes.

== Transfer of implementation authority ==
The 1966 Department of Transportation Act transferred authority for implementation of the Safety Appliance Act to the Secretary of Transportation. The Secretary designated the newly created Federal Railroad Administration (FRA) as the implementing agency. FRA began to take over enforcement responsibilities from the ICC in 1967.

== Subsequent railroad safety legislation ==
The Federal Railroad Safety Act of 1970 expanded FRA's safety responsibilities:

- covers all railroads, both intrastate and interstate
- all areas of railroad safety
- authority to issue emergency orders
- preemption of safety rules issued by individual states.

Related railroad safety legislation:

- Rail Safety Improvement Act of 1974
- Federal Railroad Safety Authorization Act of 1976
- Federal Railroad Safety Authorization Act of 1978
- Federal Railroad Safety Authorization Act of 1980
- Railroad Safety Authorization Act of 1982
- Rail Safety Improvement Act of 1988
- Rail Safety Enforcement and Review Act of 1992.

== Case law ==
- Southern Railway Co. v. United States
- United States v. Erie Railroad Co. (1915).

== See also ==
- History of rail transport in the United States
- Transportation safety in the United States
