= Gateway Program (Northeast Corridor) =

Ongoing rail-line expansion

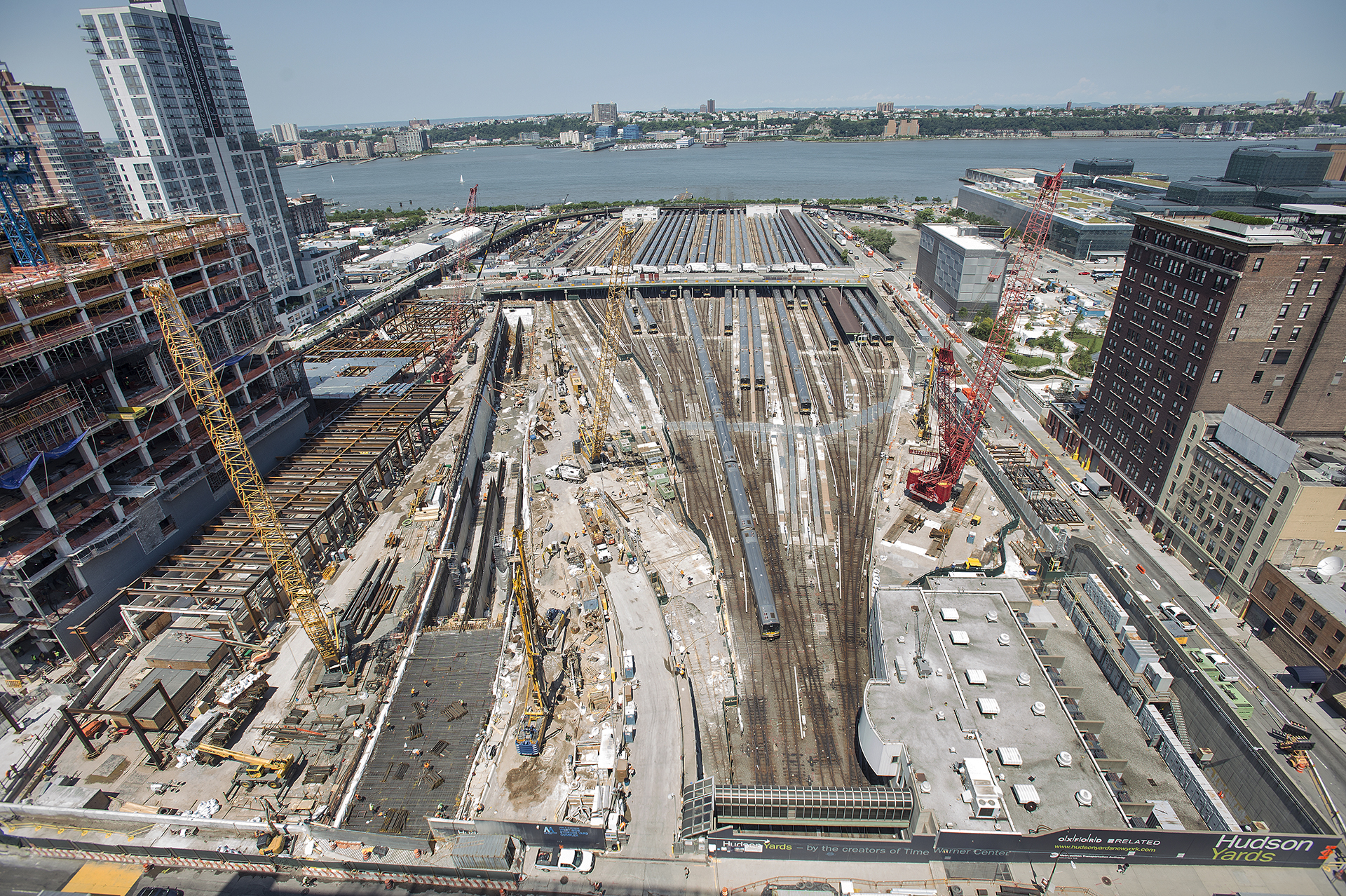
- Construction of a future Gateway Program tunnel portal at West Side Yard in Manhattan in 2014

Overview
- Status: Under Construction
- Owner: Amtrak
- Termini: Newark, New Jersey; New York City
- Website: gatewayprogram.org

Service
- Type: Rail capacity expansion
- Services: Northeast Corridor

History
- Planned opening: 2035

Technical
- Character: Underground, elevated
- Track gauge: 4 ft 8 1/2 in (1,435 mm) standard gauge

The Gateway Program is an ongoing expansion and renovation of the Northeast Corridor (NEC) rail line between Newark, New Jersey, and New York City along the right-of-way between Newark Penn Station and New York Penn Station. The project is intended to build new rail bridges in the New Jersey Meadowlands, dig a new set of tunnels under Bergen Hill (Hudson Palisades) and the Hudson River, and rehabilitate the existing 1910 tunnel, all with the goal of doubling train capacity to four tracks along the right-of-way, since the current two-track rail line, used both by Amtrak and NJ Transit Rail Operations (NJT), has reached its full capacity of 24 trains per hour.

It was unveiled as the Gateway Project in 2011, one year after the cancellation of the somewhat similar Access to the Region's Core (ARC) project. The need for renovations increased after Hurricane Sandy damaged the North River Tunnels the following year. It took nearly a decade to line up funding and regulatory approval for the biggest component, the new Hudson River tunnel, which began construction in 2023 and is scheduled to open in 2035, with rehabilitation of the old tunnels to follow by 2038. Other components that will complete the full four-track buildout between Newark Penn Station and New York, like the replacement Sawtooth Bridges, are in the planning stage, while some like the Portal South bridge still await commitments and funding.

== Background ==
=== Right-of-way ===
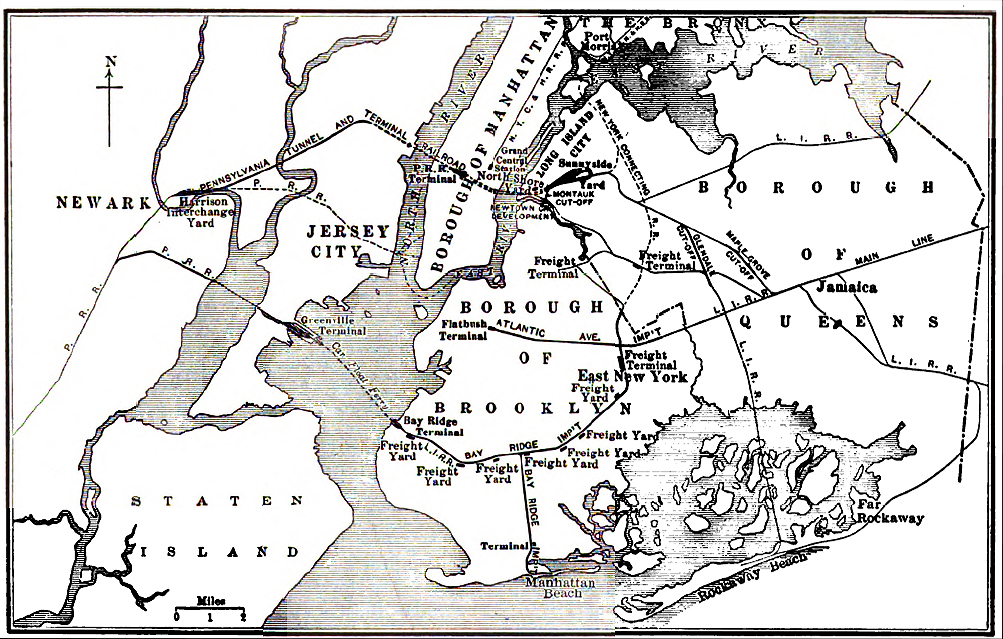
New York Tunnel Extension, 1912

The right-of-way was originally developed by the Pennsylvania Railroad (PRR) in conjunction with the 1910 opening of New York's Pennsylvania Station, which required the construction of the Portal Bridge over the Hackensack River, as well as the North River Tunnels under the Hudson Palisades and Hudson River. The following year the Manhattan Transfer station was opened in the Kearny Meadows to allow changes between steam and electric locomotives. This station also provided for passenger transfers to/from its former main terminal at Exchange Place in Jersey City or the Hudson and Manhattan Railroad (H&M), the forerunner of today's Port Authority Trans Hudson (PATH). The Dock Bridge over the Passaic River was opened in conjunction with the adjacent Newark Penn Station in 1935. In 1937, the H&M was extended over a second span, making the transfer in the meadows redundant.

In 1949, the PRR discontinued its ferry system on the Hudson, and in 1961, it closed its Exchange Place station. In 1963, due to declining traffic and revenue, the PRR demolished the above-ground New York Penn Station. It retained its below-ground passenger concourses and waiting areas, and sold its air rights, enabling construction of a new Madison Square Garden. In 1967, the Aldene Plan was implemented, requiring the floundering Central Railroad of New Jersey (CNJ), Reading (RDG), and Lehigh Valley (LV) railroads, to travel into Newark Penn while continuing service to New York Penn. Under continued financial pressure, the PRR merged with New York Central (NYC) in 1968, but the newly-formed Penn Central (PC) declared bankruptcy on June 21, 1970. In 1976, the PC long-distance service (including part of today's Northeast Corridor and Empire Corridor) was assumed by Amtrak, which had been founded in 1971. Conrail was created in 1976 to consolidate numerous Northeast private railroads, including commuter service on the CNJ and the LV. Conrail divested itself from passenger operations in 1983, and NJT assumed control.

In 1991, NJT opened the Waterfront Connection, extending service on several non-electrified trains which had previously terminated at Newark Penn Station to Hoboken. In 1996, NJT inaugurated Midtown Direct service, rerouting some trains from the west which previously terminated at Hoboken Terminal to New York Penn. Secaucus Junction was opened in 2003, allowing passengers travelling from the north to transfer to Northeast Corridor Line, North Jersey Coast Line, or Midtown Direct trains, though not to Amtrak, which made no stops there. Between 1976 and 2010, the number of NJT weekday trains crossing the Hudson using the North River Tunnels (under contract with Amtrak) increased from 147 to 438.

=== Trans-Hudson crossings ===
The Northeast Corridor is the most heavily traveled railway in the United States, and is the only rail line that travels under the Hudson River and through New York City. The other rail system crossing the Hudson was developed by the Hudson and Manhattan Railroad, partially in conjunction with the PRR, and taken over by PANYNJ in 1962, who rebranded the H&M as the PATH, a rapid transit system. Direct trans-Hudson rail service to Lower Manhattan from Newark Penn is provided by PATH with additional terminals at World Trade Center and Herald Square in Manhattan, and at Hoboken Terminal and Journal Square in Hudson County, New Jersey. In 1971 New Jersey Governor William T. Cahill proposed constructing another rail tunnel from Weehawken, New Jersey, to 48th Street in Midtown Manhattan.

There are three vehicular crossings of the lower Hudson River. The Holland Tunnel, opened in 1927, is minimally used for public transportation and connects Jersey City, New Jersey, to lower Manhattan. The George Washington Bridge, opened in 1931, is used by suburban buses to GWB Bus Terminal, and connects Fort Lee, New Jersey, to upper Manhattan. Its lower level, opened in 1962, is the last new river crossing. The Lincoln Tunnel, composed of three tubes opened in 1937, 1945, and 1954, connects Weehawken, New Jersey, to Midtown Manhattan. More than 6,000 bus trips are made through the tunnel and bus terminal daily. Its eastern terminus is connected via ramps to the Port Authority Bus Terminal, the gateway for most NJT bus traffic entering Manhattan. Despite the Lincoln Tunnel XBL (express bus lane) during the morning peak there are often long delays due to traffic congestion and the limited capacity of the bus terminal.

=== Access to the Region's Core ===
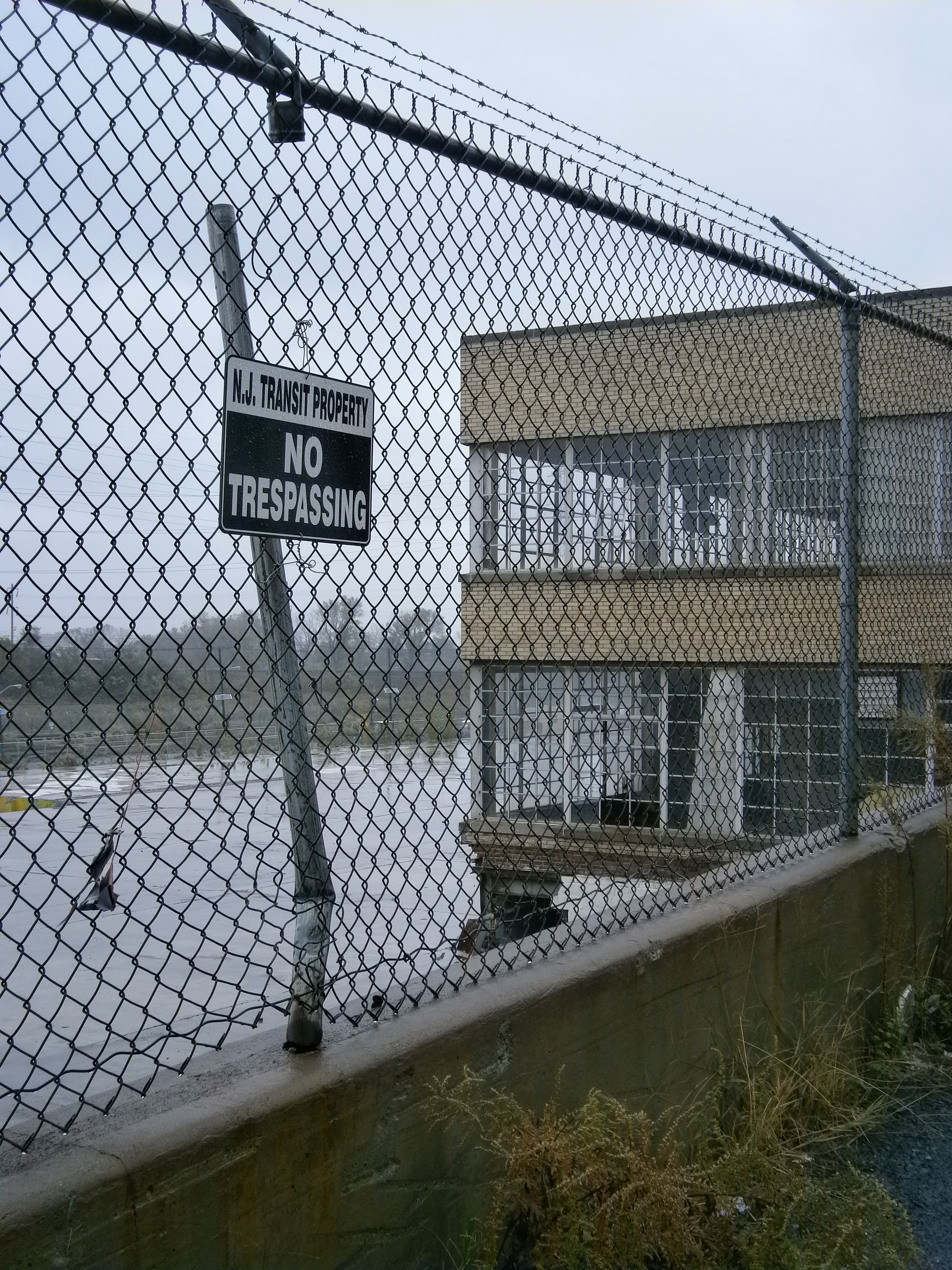
Site of the western portal of the tunnel in North Bergen at Tonnelle Avenue

Launched in 1995 by PANYNJ, NJT, and MTA, Access to the Region's Core (ARC) was a Major Investment Study that looked at public transportation ideas for the New York metropolitan area. It found that long-term goals would best be met by better connections to and in-between the region's major rail stations in Midtown Manhattan, Penn Station and Grand Central Terminal. The East Side Access project, including tunnels under the East River and the East Side of Manhattan, was completed in early 2023; some LIRR traffic has been diverted to Grand Central, freeing up track slots at Penn Station.

The Trans-Hudson Express Tunnel or THE Tunnel, which later took on the name of the study itself, was meant to address the western, or Hudson River, crossing. Engineering studies determined that structural interferences made a new terminal connected to Grand Central or the current Penn Station unfeasible and its final design involved boring under the current rail yard to a new deep cavern terminal station under 34th Street. While Amtrak had acknowledged that the region represented a bottleneck in the national system and had originally planned to complete work by 2040, its timetable for beginning the project was advanced in part due to the cancellation of ARC, a project similar in scope, but with differences in design. That project, which did not include direct Amtrak participation, was cancelled in October 2010 by New Jersey governor Chris Christie, who cited potential cost overruns. Amtrak briefly engaged the governor in attempt to revive the ARC Tunnel and use preliminary work done for it, but those negotiations soon broke down. Amtrak said it was not interested in purchasing any of the work. Senator Menendez later said some preparatory work done for ARC may be used for the new project. Costs for the project were $117 million for preliminary engineering, $126 million for final design, $15 million for construction and $178 million real estate property rights ($28 million in New Jersey and $150 million in New York City). Additionally, a $161 million partially refundable pre-payment of insurance premiums was also made.

== Plans, construction and project status ==
=== Announcement and initial phases ===
In the aftermath of New Jersey Governor Chris Christie's cancelation of the ARC tunnel, the Gateway Project was unveiled on February 7, 2011, by Amtrak President Joseph H. Boardman and New Jersey Senators Frank Lautenberg and Robert Menendez. Some previously planned improvements were included in the project to increase capacity across the New Jersey bottleneck of the Northeast Corridor, as ARC was meant to, but the new plan would include two new Hudson tunnels that would connect directly to Penn Station, their introduction would allow for the refurbishment of the existing North River Tunnels, and Amtrak would now take the lead in seeking financing.

By late 2011, two associated projects were considered part of the Gateway modernization and were underway: the replacement of the Portal Bridge over the Hackensack River, and the development of Moynihan Train Hall in Manhattan. Environmental impact statements had been completed, and the design and engineering of the new bridges had begun. The ceremonial groundbreaking of the first phase of conversion of the James Farley Post Office into the Moynihan Train Hall took place in October 2010, partially funded by the American Recovery and Reinvestment Act of 2009.

=== Projected costs ===
In 2011, the project was projected to take $13.5 billion and nine years, and Amtrak asked that $1.3 billion in United States Department of Transportation funding for NEC rail corridor improvements be allocated to Gateway. In November, Congress allocated $15 million for initial engineering work. In April 2012, a U.S. Senate subcommittee proposed another $20 million. In September 2012, Schumer estimated that the project would need $20 million in 2013 and $100 million in 2014 to keep it from dying.

After Hurricane Sandy in 2012, Amtrak requested $276 million from Congress to upgrade damaged infrastructure that would also eventually support trains running along the new Gateway Project right-of-way. Congress did not provide funding in its Sandy relief legislation, but the U.S. Department of Transportation provided $185 million from its own Sandy relief and resiliency funds to build the "tunnel box" under the Hudson Yards redevelopment project and rebuild an overlapping Maintenance of Equipment building for the Long Island Rail Road.

=== Development corporation ===
In November 2015, the creation of the Gateway Development Corporation was announced by Amtrak, U.S. Senators Cory Booker and Chuck Schumer, and Governors Christie and Andrew Cuomo. The corporation would oversee planning, environmental, design, engineering, and construction work, and seek federal grants and loans. Its board was composed of Port Authority of New York and New Jersey board members, the USDOT, and Amtrak, while its staff consisted of PANYNJ and Amtrak employees.

In December 2015, federal legislation was introduced to allow Amtrak to operate the NEC as a financially separate entity that could invest profits from the line into its infrastructure. The legislation also provided for more low-interest loans through changes in the Railroad Rehabilitation and Improvement Financing and Capital Investment Grant (New Starts) federal funding programs. In March 2016, Amtrak and PANYNJ committed $35 million each for design and engineering work.

The group met for the first time on January 12, 2017. On June 30, 2017, the U.S. Department of Transportation sent a letter to the Gateway Development Corporation permanently withdrawing from its board of trustees. Shortly afterward, the draft Environmental Impact Study for the project was issued.

=== Federal funding issues ===
The administration of President Barack Obama called Gateway the most vital piece of infrastructure that needs to be built in the United States, and in a September 2015 joint letter, New Jersey Governor Chris Christie and New York Governor Andrew Cuomo offered to pay half of the project's cost if the federal government picked up the rest. After President Donald Trump took office, however, his administration began to cast doubt on funding the project, as Trump suggested defunding the Federal Transit Administration's New Starts program for all new projects, despite his own Secretary of Transportation Elaine Chao calling the project "an absolute priority".

In September 2017, $900 million was allocated for the project in a House of Representatives spending bill, but under pressure from Trump, 155 Republican and four Democratic representatives co-sponsored a proposed amendment to remove the funding. On December 29, 2017, multiple news sources published a letter from a Trump administration FTA official who stated that the Gateway Program was a "local" project, putting federal funding for the project in doubt.

In March 2018, Trump directly pressured Republican House Speaker Paul Ryan to oppose federal funding for the Gateway Program in the omnibus spending bill that was then being worked on. When the Consolidated Appropriations Act was signed on March 23, 2018, it provided $2.9 billion to discretionary grant programs, which Democrats said could provide as much as $541 million for Gateway, with $388 million coming from $650 million for improvements to the Northeast Corridor and another $153 million coming from FTA grants.

In June 2018, the State of New Jersey approved $600 million in bonds to finance the Portal Bridge part of the project. In its 2020 budget, the Trump administration again proposed cutting funding for the Gateway Program by half, from $650 to $325 million.

=== Creation of commission ===
By 2019, project stakeholders had decided to create a bi-state agency to oversee the project's planning, funding, and construction of the rail tunnels and bridges. Creating the Gateway Development Commission required identical legislation in the New York and New Jersey legislatures, which both states passed on June 24, 2019. The law set standards for transparency and accountability and said that each state was responsible for half the funding. The Commission could receive funds from federal, state, and local sources. The Commission's first CEO, Kris Kolluri, was nominated by New York governor Kathy Hochul and New Jersey governor Phil Murphy in early 2022.

=== Approval, funding, and start of construction under Biden ===
With the inauguration of Joe Biden as U.S. President in January 2021, discussion resumed on funding the Gateway Program. Schumer, who had become Senate majority leader, said that month he was working with Transportation Secretary Pete Buttigieg's support to allocate $12 billion to the project.

On May 28, 2021, the project was formally approved by the United States Department of Transportation. The Infrastructure Investment and Jobs Act, passed in November 2021, appropriated billions for projects like Gateway and other upgrades to the Northeast Corridor. The next month, the United States Army Corps of Engineers gave final approval. Early in 2022, the Federal Transit Administration upgraded the rating for the sought Federal Grant share of the tunnel to project, making it eligible for funding.

In July 2022, New Jersey and New York officials each agreed to pay 25% of the project's cost; under the agreement, federal officials would pay 50%. On August 31, 2022, the Gateway Development Commission announced the new tunnels would be completed in 2035 at a total cost of $16.1 billion. Schumer said in December 2022 that construction would commence in 2023 with $292 million in federal funding, which Biden announced would be used to complete the Hudson Yards "tunnel box". In July 2023, the FTA promised a $6.88 billion grant, the largest transit grant that the federal government had ever given, and the grant was handed to the Gateway Development Corporation in July 2024. Another $3.8 billion grant was provided in November 2023; in total, $12 billion in federal funding for the $16 billion project was committed by the 2024 presidential election, bringing the project to a "point of no return".

Construction began in 2023 with various pieces underway as of 2025. The Tonnelle Avenue overpass was expected to be completed in October 2025, concrete casing near Hudson Yards is expected in 2026, Hudson River ground stabilization is projected by March 2027, the Palisades tunnel approach on the New Jersey side is expected to be completed in 2027, and the Manhattan tunnel project will clear a path on the New York side by October 2029. As of 2024, the tunnel is scheduled to open in 2035, with the rehabilitation of the existing North River Tunnels to be completed by 2038.

=== Advocacy concerns ===
In August 2025, the editorial board of the New York Daily News reported that the Regional Plan Association received support from Amtrak to operate the Build Gateway Now coalition and contended that this compromised the group's independence in debates over Penn Station and the Gateway Program. RPA's fiscal year 2023 Form 990 discloses that this coalition work was supported by Amtrak, noting a grant of $350,000 for 18 months beginning in January 2022 and a renewed grant of $500,000 for 18 months beginning in January 2024, and it describes activities that include research, communications, and advocacy such as testifying at Gateway Development Commission board meetings. Amtrak documentation identifies RPA president Tom Wright as a co-chair of the Penn Station Working Advisory Group convened in 2024.

=== Second Trump administration ===
In June 2025, the second Trump administration proposed to allocate a combined $1 billion for the project and Second Avenue Subway Phase 2, but in October, at the start of the 2025 United States federal government shutdown, Office of Management and Budget director Russell Vought withheld a combined $18 billion for the two projects, citing reports of diversity, equity, and inclusion (DEI) practices that he described as "unconstitutional". Politico reported that Vought was retaliating for the government shutdown, and Trump later vowed to terminate the funding entirely. Work continued for several months, after the Gateway Development Commission obtained a line of credit. By late 2025, pieces of the two tunnel boring machines (TBMs) were being shipped to New Jersey for assembly. In December, when work on the Tonnelle Avenue overpass was nearly complete. administration officials said the funding for the projects could be unfrozen if they discontinued DEI practices.

Officials announced in January 2026 that work would stop on February 6 unless the administration lifted its funding freeze. Schumer asked federal officials to unfreeze $4.38 billion that had been approved under Biden's tenure. One administration spokesperson said the freeze had not been lifted because of Democratic politicians' opposition to Trump's immigration policy. Trump himself said he would release the funds if Dulles Airport and New York Penn Station were renamed for him. In early February, the Gateway Development Commission sued to unfreeze the funding, and the New Jersey and New York state governments filed a similar lawsuit. Construction was suspended on February 5, when $2 billion had been spent on the project. A judge ruled the next day that the funds should be unfrozen pending litigation, and funding was released the following week. Work resumed in late February, and the funding freeze was blocked permanently by U.S. District Judge Jeannette Vargas in New York on June 29, 2026.

=== Governance ===
Since July 2023, the board has consisted of:

- New Jersey Co-Chair – Balpreet Grewal-Virk – Appointed by Phil Murphy
- New York Co-Chair – Alicia Glen – Appointed by Kathy Hochul
- Amtrak Vice Chair – Tony Coscia
- New Jersey Commissioner – Janine Bauer – Appointed by Phil Murphy
- New Jersey Commissioner – Amy Rosen – Appointed by Phil Murphy
- New York Commissioner – Jamey Barbas – Appointed by Andrew Cuomo
- New York Commissioner – Marie Therese Dominguez – Appointed by Andrew Cuomo

As of July 2023, the Executive Director was Kris Kolluri, who resigned July 18, 2024, one month after he was repeatedly mentioned in the indictment of powerful South Jersey political boss George Norcross. He was succeeded in 2025 by Thomas F. Prendergast.

== Project components ==
The 11 miles (18 km) Northeast Corridor route between Newark Penn Station and New York Penn Station includes infrastructure that was built in the 1900s and 1910s. The system operates at capacity during peak hours—24 trains per hour—and limits speed for safety reasons. The upgraded four-track route would run parallel to the current right-of-way, enabling dispatching alternatives, potential speed increases, and up to 48 trains per hour.

=== Newark Penn, Dock Bridge, and Harrison PATH station ===
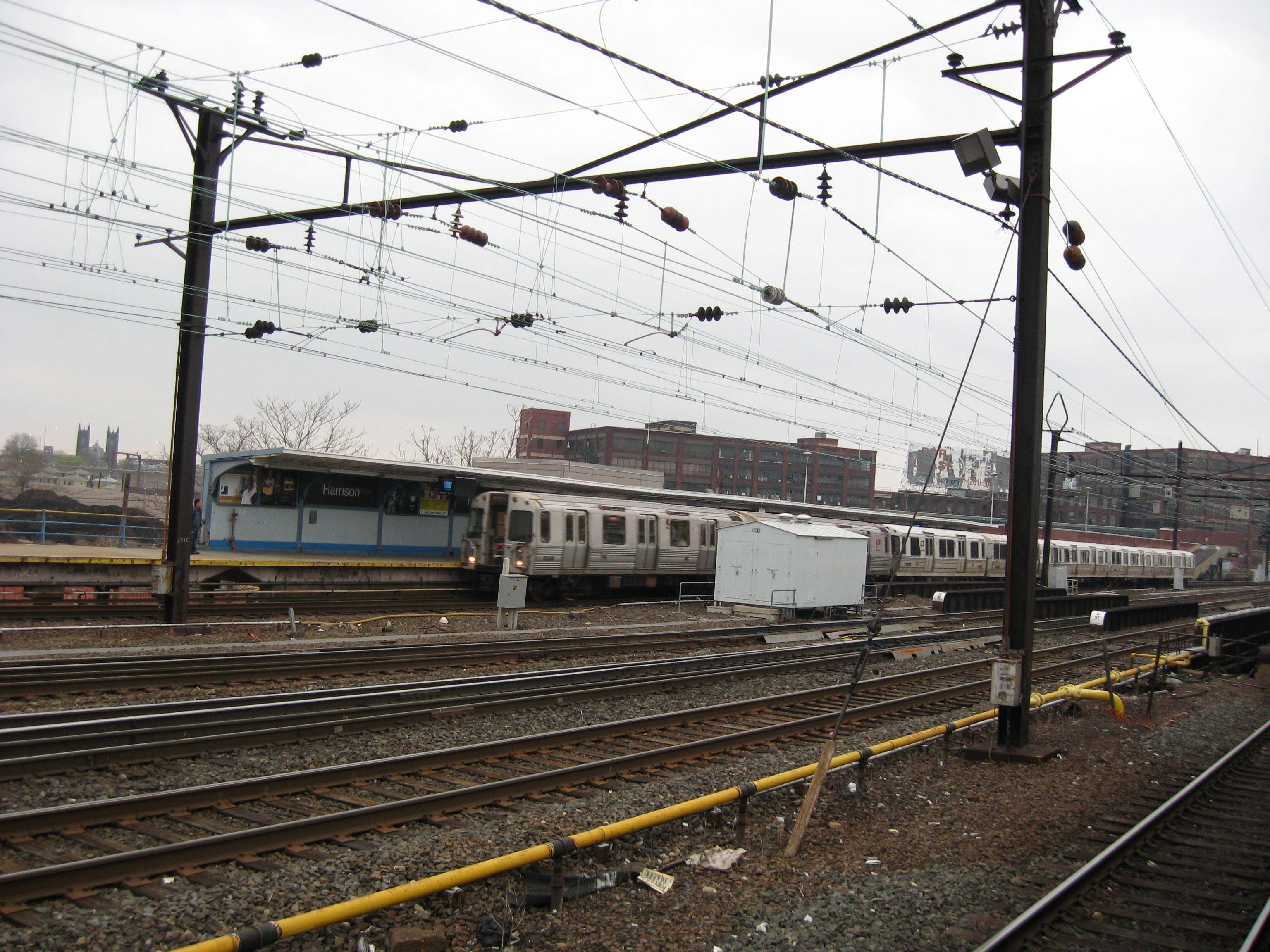
NEC passes through Harrison Station.

Six tracks connect Newark Penn Station and the adjacent Dock Bridge over the Passaic River at 40°44′05″N 74°9′51″W. The station and the west span of the bridge, carrying three tracks, were built in 1935. The east span, opened in 1937, carries one outbound track and the two Port Authority Trans Hudson (PATH) rapid transit tracks. To the northeast lies the PATH's Harrison station. From the bridge and through the station, Amtrak and NJT trains run on three center tracks; the PATH uses side platforms. Maps for the Gateway Program indicate that a fourth track for the NEC will be added through the station.

The bridge, owned by the Port Authority of New York and New Jersey (PANYNJ), was repaired in 2009.

In the 2010s, the station received a $173 million reconstruction and expansion. Unrelated to the Gateway Program, it was funded by the PANYNJ, which owns and operates the PATH, and the Federal Transit Administration.

=== Sawtooth Bridges ===
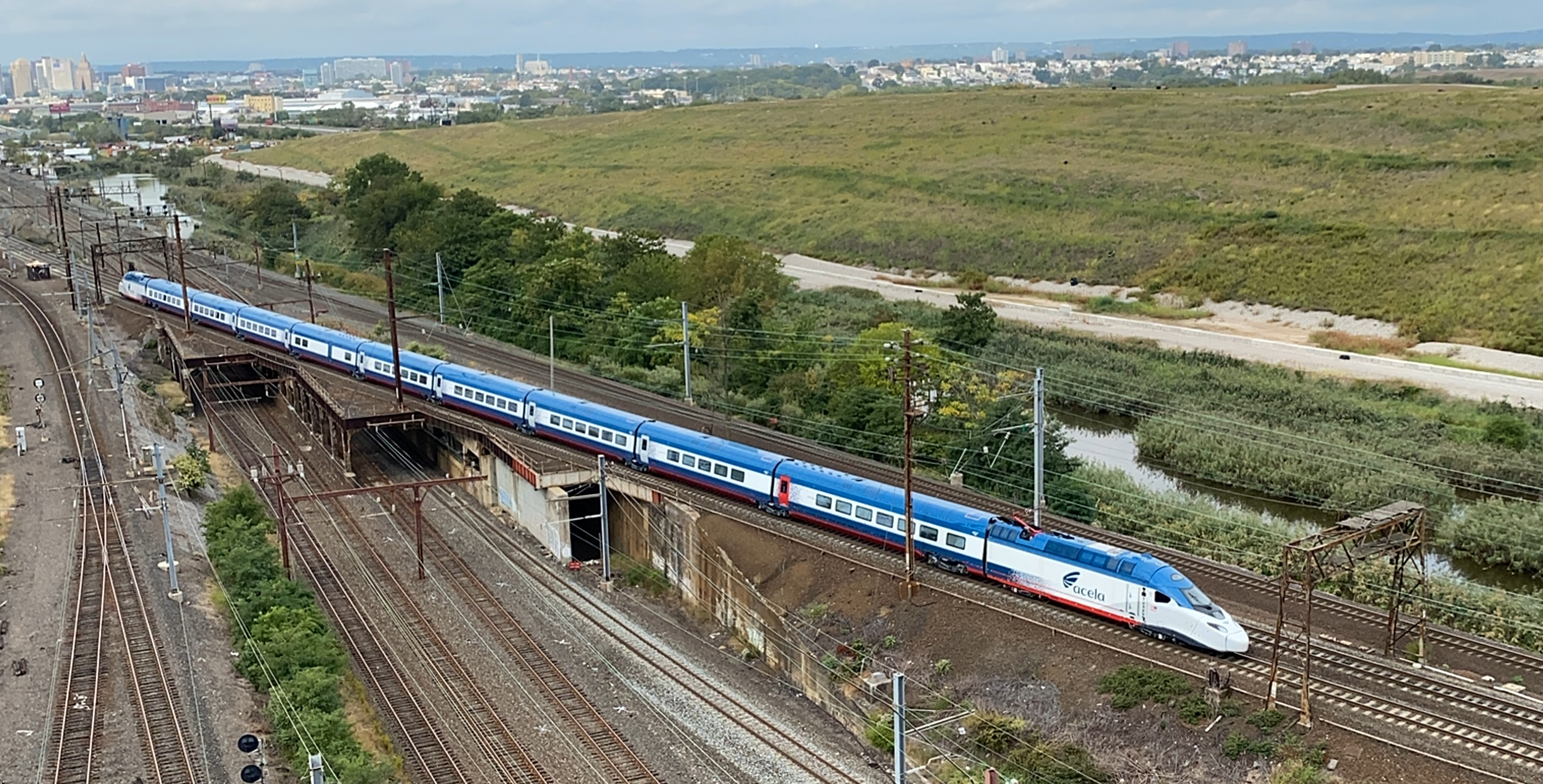
Amtrak Bridge 7.80 crossing over NJTransit

At the Sawtooth Bridges east of the former Manhattan Transfer, the rights-of-way of Amtrak, and PATH, and several NJ Transit lines converge and run parallel to each other. While there is no junction with PATH, NJ Transit trains can switch tracks, depending on their terminal of origination or destination, enabling Midtown Direct trains on the Morris and Essex Lines to join or depart the Northeast Corridor. The single track limited-use Waterfront Connection connects some lines using diesel trains on Hoboken Terminal trips with the NEC to the west.

Plans call for replacing the two 1907-era viaducts with three new bridges in the Kearny Meadows at Newark Turnpike and Belleville Turnpike, doubling capacity to four NEC tracks and raising top speeds to 90 mph. In June 2026, Amtrak and NJT announced that the project was moving forward with $133 million for "enabling components," and that Amtrak had also applied for $3 billion in additional funding, with a hoped-for completion date of 2035.

=== Portal Bridge ===
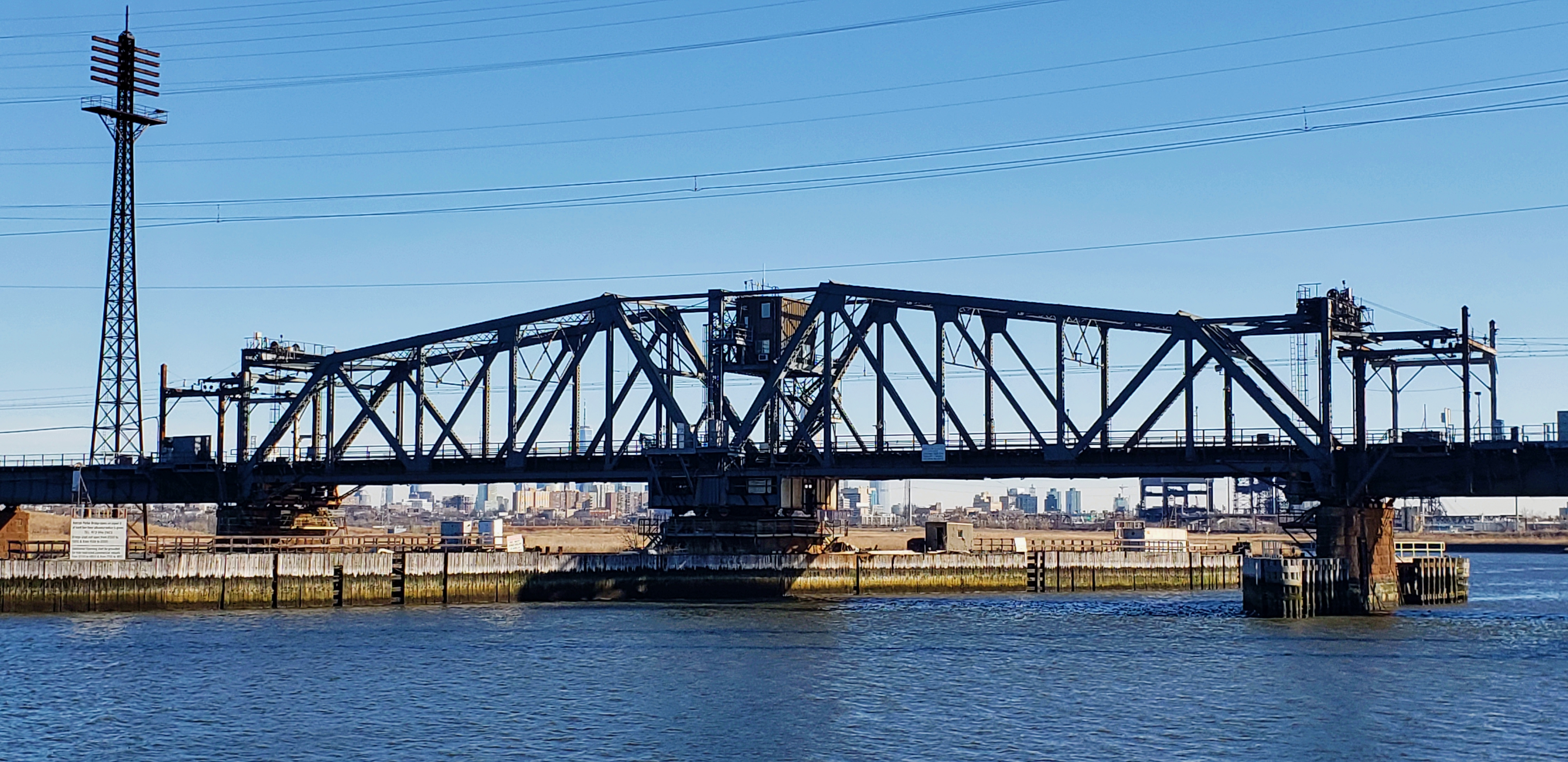
The Portal Bridge is a major pinch point of the Northeast Corridor, as problems closing the bridge cause delays for thousands of rail commuters.

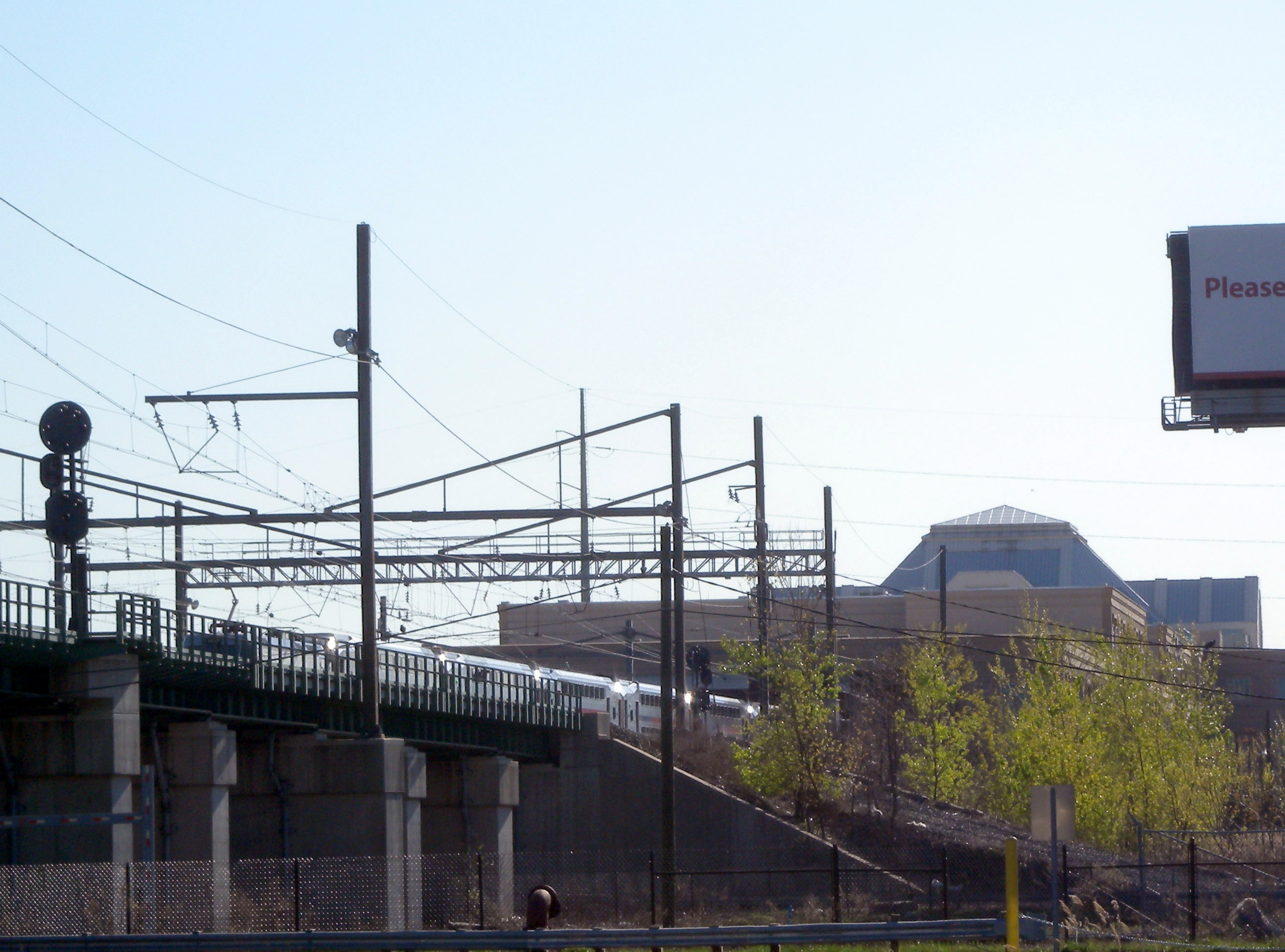
The right-of-way would parallel the NEC and pass through Secaucus Junction.

The old Portal Bridge is a two-track, rail-only, 961-foot (293 m) swing bridge over the Hackensack River between Kearny and Secaucus. Its design limited train speeds, temporarily prohibited crossings when open, and required frequent and costly maintenance. Its lowest beams are 23 feet (7.0 m) above the water, so it opens regularly for shipping, though not during weekday rush hours, when trains have priority. In addition to the drawbacks that come with the swing bridge design itself, due to its substantial age and bad state of repair, the Portal Bridge frequently fails to close properly after swinging back, causing major disruptions for riders on NJ Transit and Amtrak.

In December 2008, the Federal Railroad Administration (FRA) approved a $1.34 billion project to replace the Portal Bridge with two new bridges: a three-track bridge to the north, and a two-track bridge to the south. Construction on the new bridges had originally been scheduled to begin in 2010 and complete in 2017, but the project encountered numerous delays and was reduced to a single two-track bridge primarily due to a lack of state and federal funding during the Republican administrations of New Jersey Governor, Chris Christie and U.S. President Donald Trump, both of whom opposed the project. In June 2020, Trump informed NJ Governor Phil Murphy that he would no longer oppose the Portal North Bridge, which would replace the tracks on the existing Portal Bridge and yield reliability improvements but not increase capacity. The complementary Portal South Bridge, which would double the number of tracks to four to match the rest of the corridor, remains unfunded as of 2026.

Construction on the Portal North Bridge began on August 1, 2022. The first of the Portal North Bridge's three arches was floated into place in November 2024, and the last arch was floated into place in February 2025. The first track on the bridge entered service on March 13, 2026, and both tracks were in service beginning November 16, 2026.

=== Secaucus Junction–Bergen Loop ===
Opened on December 15, 2003, at a cost of $450 million, Secaucus Junction (at 40.76161°N 74.074985°W) is an interchange station served by nine of New Jersey Transit's rail lines, and is sited where Hoboken Terminal trains intersect with those traveling along the Northeast Corridor. Passenger transfers are possible, but there is no rail junction. While Access to the Region's Core had planned a loop to create a junction, original plans for the Gateway Program did not. Amtrak trains pass through the station, but do not stop there, nor are there plans to include an Amtrak stop. In April 2012, Amtrak announced that the project might include a "Bergen Loop" connecting Main Line, Bergen County Line, Pascack Valley Line and Port Jervis Line service to the NEC at Secaucus Junction. MTA constituencies are encouraging the agency to include funding for the loop its capital plan.

If a loop were built, passengers bound for New York Penn Station would not need to use Secaucus Junction for transfers. Trains using the loop would also increase the capacity demands on the already over-capacity NEC, which the Gateway Program is designed to alleviate. Suburban property owners along the Main Line/Bergen County Line and Pascack Valley Line would stand to gain economically as property values have increased significantly along commuter rail lines once they were upgraded to offer "single-seat commutes".

=== Tunnels ===
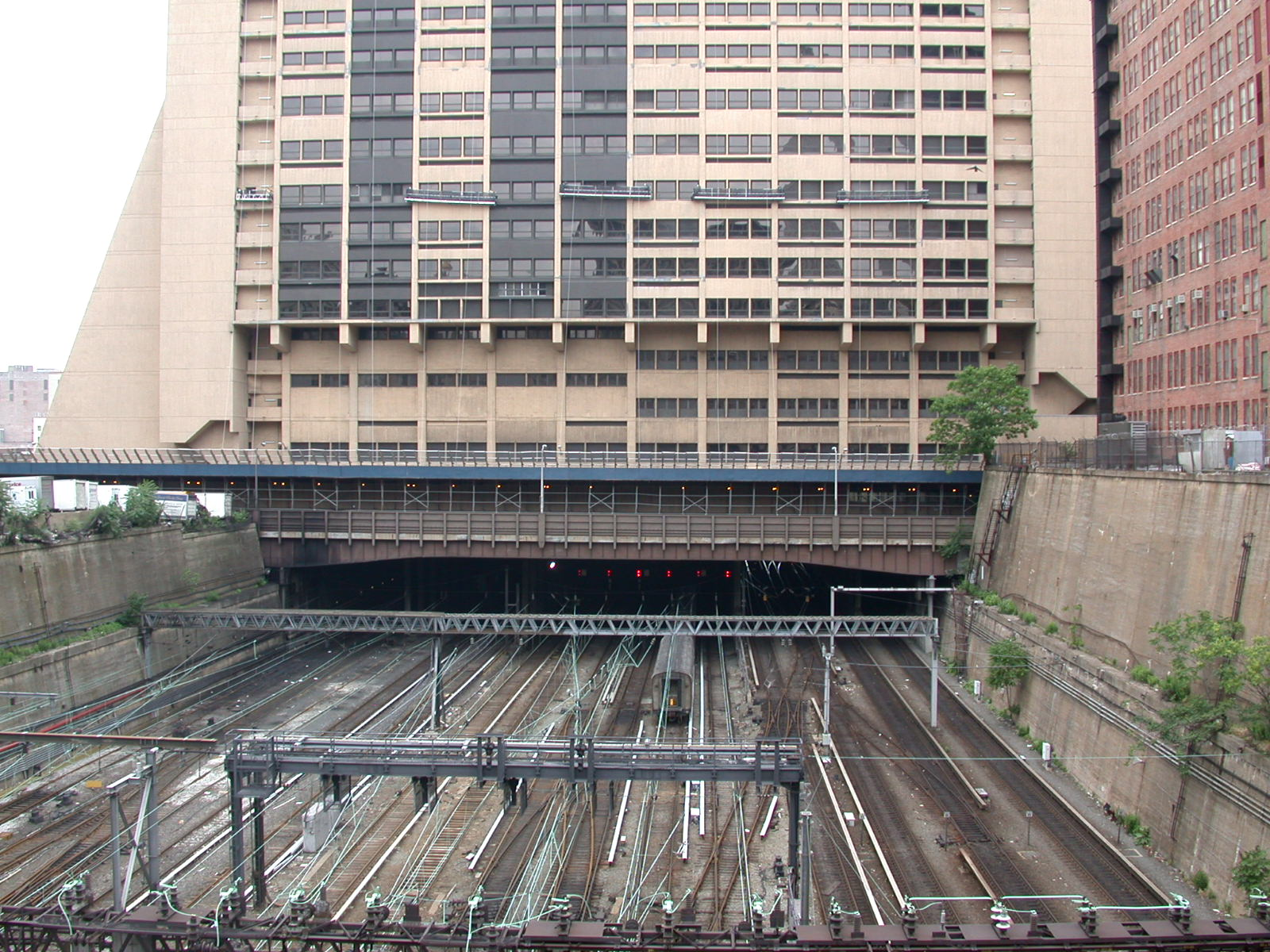
The Gateway Tunnel will join the current right-of-way at the south side (left.)

The Gateway Program includes two new tunnels, doubling the rail capacity. The current North River Tunnels allow a maximum of 24 one-way crossings per hour; the Gateway proposal would allow an additional 24 trains per hour.

If the new Hudson Tunnel is not built, the North River Tunnels will have to be closed one at a time, reducing weekday service below the existing level of 24 trains per hour. Due to the need to provide two-way service on a single track, service would be reduced by over 50 per cent. In the best-case scenario, with perfect operating conditions, 9 trains per hour could be provided through the tunnel, or a 63% reduction in service. During the duration of construction, passengers would have to use overcrowded PATH, buses, and ferries to get between New Jersey and New York.

The North River Tunnels need to be repaired without major reductions in weekday service, making it necessary to have new tunnels built. Once the new tunnels open, the two North River Tunnels would close for repairs, one at a time, with the existing level of service maintained. This is because the new tunnel would be located further south–there would be no access to Track 19, and Tracks 9–18 would only have access to the tunnel by the single I ladder-track. Once the new North River Tunnels reopen in 2030, capacity on the line would be doubled. The Hudson Tunnel Project would also allow for resiliency on the Northeast Corridor to be increased, making service along the line more reliable with redundant capacity.

While the Hudson Tunnel Project would double the number of tracks under the Hudson River, it would not result in an increase in rail capacity due to constraints at Penn Station. Penn Station operates at capacity during peak periods. There are inadequate train storage facilities at Penn, and there is no capacity in the East River Tunnels to allow for trains to be stored during middays at Sunnyside Yard. Without these additional improvements, it is assumed that the same number of trains going between New Jersey and New York today would be operating in 2030, albeit with the additional tunnel capacity.

==== North River Tunnels ====
The North River Tunnels were 102 years old when they were inundated by seawater from Hurricane Sandy in October 2012. In May 2014, Amtrak CEO Joseph Boardman told the Regional Plan Association that there was something less than 20 years before one or both of the tunnels would have to be shut down.

As a result of the storm damage and the tunnels' age, component failures regularly occur within the tubes, resulting in frequent delays. One report in 2019 estimated that the North River Tubes and the Portal Bridge contributed to 2,000 hours of delays between 2014 and 2018.

==== Hudson Tunnel ====
The Gateway Hudson River tunnel, one point of which would be at 40.75479°N 74.01677°W, will travel from a point at Weehawken Cove under the Hudson River and its eastern portal south of West Side Yard in Manhattan. Engineering studies for ARC along this route had been deemed unfeasible. Surveys of properties that would or would not be affected by underground construction at the underground eastern end of the ARC Tunnel had been completed.

In April 2011, $188 million in federal funding was requested for preliminary engineering studies and environmental analysis. On May 2, 2016, the FRA published a Notice of Intent to jointly prepare an environmental impact statement (EIS) with NJ Transit for the Hudson Tunnel Project under the National Environmental Policy Act (NEPA). The EIS will evaluate the potential environmental impacts of a reasonable range of alternatives, including a no-build alternative. As appropriate, FRA and NJ Transit will coordinate with Amtrak and PANYNJ on the EIS.

The ARC Tunnel was to be built in three sections: under the Hudson Palisades, under the Hudson River, and under the streets of Manhattan, where it would have dead-ended. The Hudson Tunnel will likely be built along the footprint of the Palisades and river sections, but will enable trains to join the current interlocking once it emerges. A flying junction is planned for later stages. This will allow Amtrak and NJT to continue to use the East River Tunnels and Sunnyside Yards for staging, storage, and carrying Amtrak NEC trains. The Draft Environmental Impact Study (DEIS) for the Gateway tunnels was issued in June 2017. Four alternatives for alignments under the Hudson River and the Palisades. Option 1 would have the new tunnels run close to the existing tunnels with a ventilation site near the Lincoln Tunnel Helix. This option would have required a construction staging site within the Lincoln Tunnel Helix, thus displacing New Jersey Transit's Weehawken bus storage site, which would have a negative impact on the operation of buses to the Port Authority Bus Terminal. Option 2 would have the new tunnels run further south than the first option, with a shaft site north of 19th Street near JFK Boulevard East. This option would require the acquisition and demolition of an existing multi-story office building to build the shaft site. The third option would be further south, with a shaft site south of 19th Street. This option would preclude the development of a portion of a planned residential development under construction at 800 Harbor Boulevard. The fourth option would be further south with a shaft site south of 18th Street, following the same horizontal alignment identified in the ARC FEIS. Alignment Option 4 was chosen for the build alternative, even though it would have a slightly longer tunnel than the other alternatives. Because of the additional length, there would be additional tunneling costs for this option. The first three options have greater pre-construction risks, meaning that if construction were delayed, the cost difference would be minimized. In addition, Option 4 does not have the issues that the first three options have.

The new tunnel would be built to comply with the National Fire Protection Association (NFPA) 130, Standard for Fixed Guideway Transit and Passenger Rail Systems, with the two tubes connected by cross passages every 750 feet (230 m) with fire-rated doors to separate the two tubes. The tunnel would be constructed through the use of two tunnel boring machines beneath the river bottom. The first construction contract relating to the tunnel itself, a contract for stabilizing the riverbed, was awarded in February 2024. By mid-2024, the first tunnel boring machine was scheduled to begin digging in late 2024 or early 2025, while a second TBM was to begin digging in 2026. Each TBM was expected to take two years to finish excavating its respective tube. Though tunneling had still not begun by mid-2025, both of the TBMs were nearly fully assembled by then, and work was scheduled to begin in mid-2026.

In April 2026, the Gateway Development Commission hired Traylor–Walsh–Skanska Joint Venture to construct the tunnel for about $1.29 billion. There remained obstacles in the path of the tunnels, including hundreds of piers from the long-demolished Pier 68 on the New York side. That August, the Gateway Development Commission endorsed the establishment of an emergency rescue team for the new tunnels. The first tunnel boring machine began digging on September 28, followed by the second in mid-November.

==== Palisades Tunnel ====
A groundbreaking for ARC was held on June 8, 2009, for new underpass at 40°45′56″N 74°2′14″W, under Tonnelle Avenue in North Bergen near the site western portal of the tunnel through Hudson Palisades just south of the North River Tunnels. The land, which cost $26.3 million, is owned by NJT. A tunneling contract for the Palisades Tunnel was awarded on May 5, 2010, to Skanska. Maps indicate this part of the Hudson Tunnel would follow a route to the Weehawken-Hoboken border. In October 2012, in an eminent domain case for a property in Weehawken NJ Transit acquired a parcel in the path of the tunnel for $8.5 million. Federal funding of $25 million for the completion of an overpass carrying U.S. Route 1/9 above the New Jersey portal was authorized in June 2023, and the Gateway Development Commission awarded $47.3 million in contracts that September to raise Tonnelle Avenue above the portal. Work on the Tonnelle Avenue overpass began in November 2023. In December 2025, when work on the Tonnelle Avenue overpass was nearly complete.

=== Hudson Yards "tunnel box" and West Side Yard ===
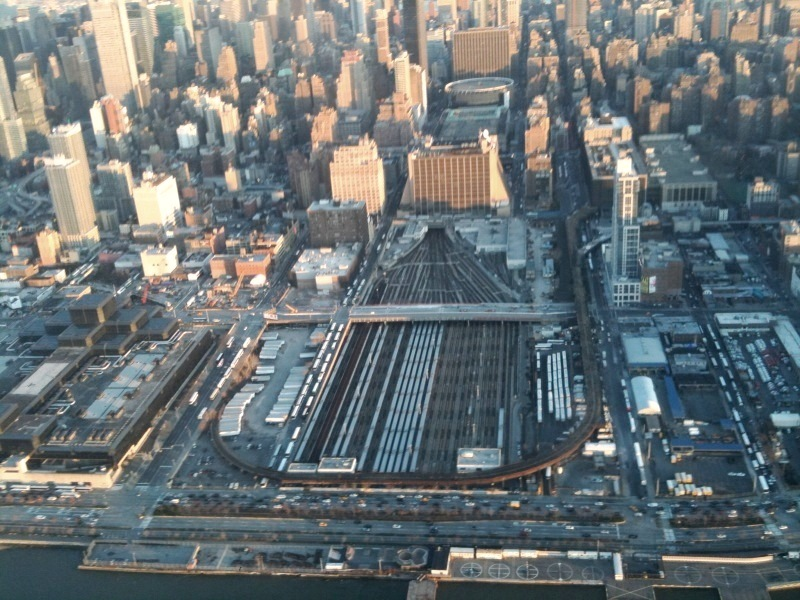
A "tunnel box" was built in the West Side Yard to preserve a right-of-way for future use.

The air rights over the West Side Yard are being developed as a residential and commercial district on a platform constructed over the yard as part of the Hudson Yards project. Placing a new Amtrak portal in Manhattan could have conflicted with the Hudson Yards project, which broke ground in late 2012. In February 2013, Amtrak officials said they would commission a project to preserve a right-of-way under Hudson Yards for future use, to be built with $120 million to $150 million in federal funds. in June 2013 it was announced that $183 million had been dedicated to the "tunnel box" as part of Hurricane Sandy recovery funding.

Construction began on the first phase, from 10th Avenue and 11th Avenue between 31st Street and 33rd Streets, on September 23, 2013, at 40.754661°N 74.003783°W. The underground concrete casing for the first phase was 800 ft (240 m) long, 50 ft (15 m) wide, and about 35 ft (11 m) tall. Amtrak awarded Tutor Perini a $133 million contract to build a section of box tunnel. This portion was completed a year later. Amtrak, NJ Transit, and the MTA applied to the Federal Transit Administration for a $65 million matching grant for another 105 ft (32 m) long structure to preserve the right-of-way at 11th Avenue in Manhattan under a viaduct that was rehabilitated in 2009–2011. Construction started in December 2014 and was nearing completion as of July 2017, though funding disputes stalled the tunnel box's completion. The tunnel box was substantially complete by November 2017. The following phase would extend the casing between 11th and 12th Avenue as the development of Hudson Yards continues westward. Work on the concrete tunnel box resumed in November 2023. In July 2025, workers diverted 12th Avenue so they could begin the ground freezing of the riverbed, which in turn would allow workers to begin digging the tunnel under the river.

To connect the tunnel to Penn Station, extensive track modifications will be required. The profile of several tracks will have to be lowered so that they can meet the grade of the new tunnel tracks at the new portal within A Yard. The I Ladder track, which runs diagonal to the other tracks to provide connections to the platform tracks, would be extended to connect to the new tracks from the tunnel, allowing trains to stop on Tracks 1 through 18. Some tracks within A Yard would be reconfigured. While construction takes place in A Yard, the three trains stored in A Yard and D Yard would be stored in other locations due to the unavailability of storage tracks in those yards. The Empire Line tunnel, near Tenth Avenue, will be modified: 100 feet of that tunnel beneath Tenth Avenue will be lowered so its tracks can connect to the lower track profile in A Yard. This work will be done during weekends over a 20-month period, or through a full closure of the Empire Line tunnel for two to three months. All of this work would take 21 months.

=== New York Penn Station ===
Penn Station, the 1968 structure that replaced the original Pennsylvania Station in New York, has been called the "busiest, most congested, passenger transportation facility in North America on a daily basis". It is used by Amtrak, New Jersey Transit, and the Long Island Rail Road (LIRR), and served by several New York City Subway lines. Between 1976 and 2010 weekday train movements increased 89%, from 661 to 1,248, reaching what is considered to be capacity. In 2010, the station saw 550,000 daily boardings/alightings.

Penn Station is part of the Pennsylvania Plaza complex that includes Madison Square Garden (MSG). In 2013, the New York City Council voted to extend the MSG Special Permit by up to ten years, in an effort to have the arena move to a different location so that a new station structure can be built in its place.

==== Moynihan Train Hall ====
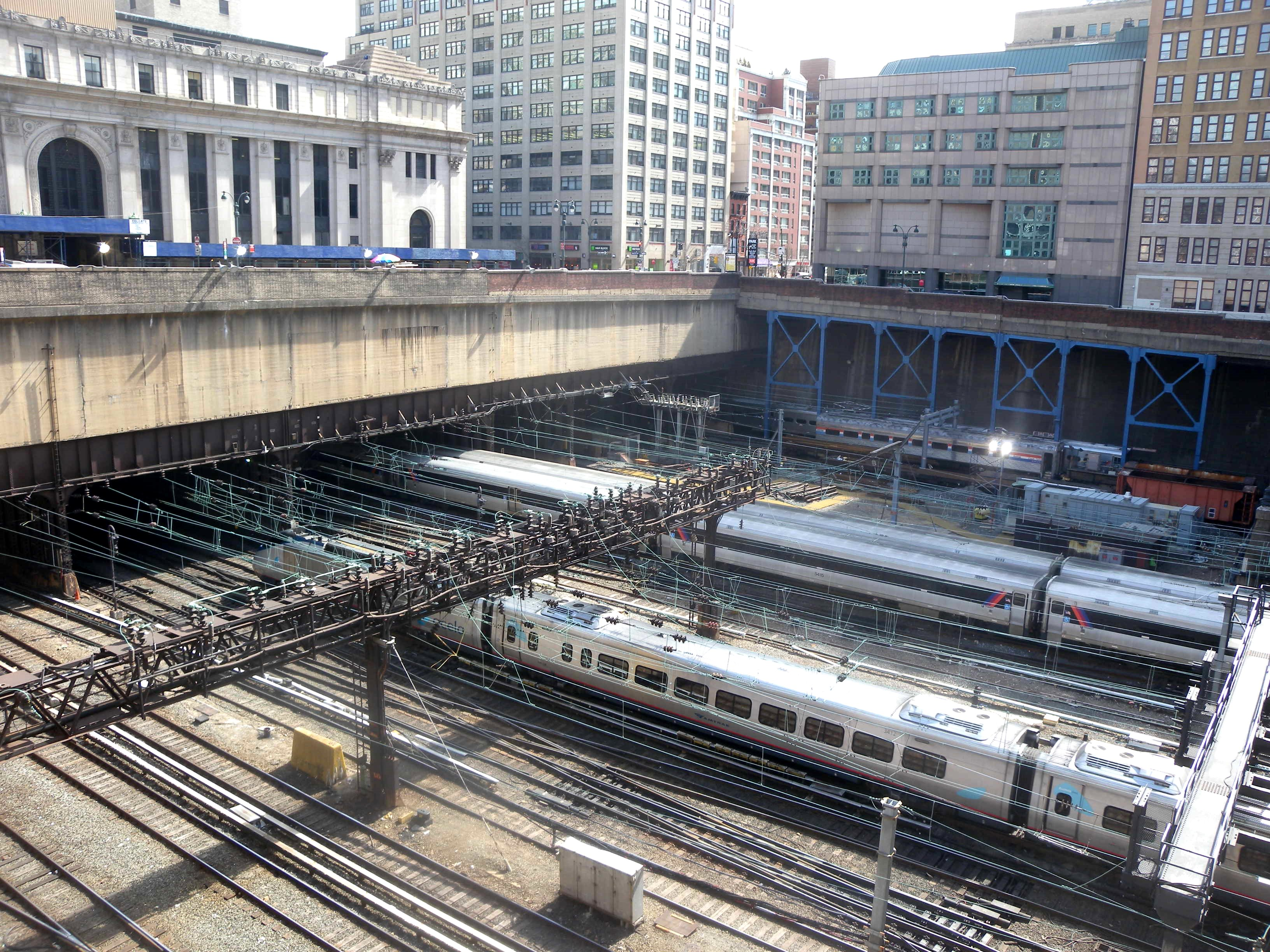
NEC passes under the James Farley Post Office, as seen looking southeast at the rear of the building.

In the early 1990s, then-New York Senator Daniel Moynihan championed a proposal to convert the James Farley Post Office to a train station. Opened in 1912, soon after the original Pennsylvania Station, the landmark building stood across from Penn Plaza and was built over tracks approaching the station from the west.

In 2010, work began on a $267 million Phase 1. This phase consisted of an expansion of the Long Island Rail Road's underground West End Concourse, which ran under the Farley Building's main entrance, as well as two entrances to the existing Penn Station platforms through the Farley Building on Eighth Avenue. A groundbreaking ceremony took place on October 18, 2010. In May 2012, the PANYNJ announced that a $270 million contract for the first phase, including the concourse expansion under 8th Avenue, had been awarded. The West End Concourse opened in June 2017.

Phase 2 consisted of the new train hall in the fully renovated Farley Building. In January 2016, New York governor Cuomo announced plans for a combined Penn-Farley Post Office complex, a project estimated to cost $3 billion. At that time, the project was renamed Moynihan Train Hall. In August 2017, a groundbreaking ceremony was held for the Moynihan Train Hall. The train hall opened to the public on January 1, 2021.

==== Penn Station South ====
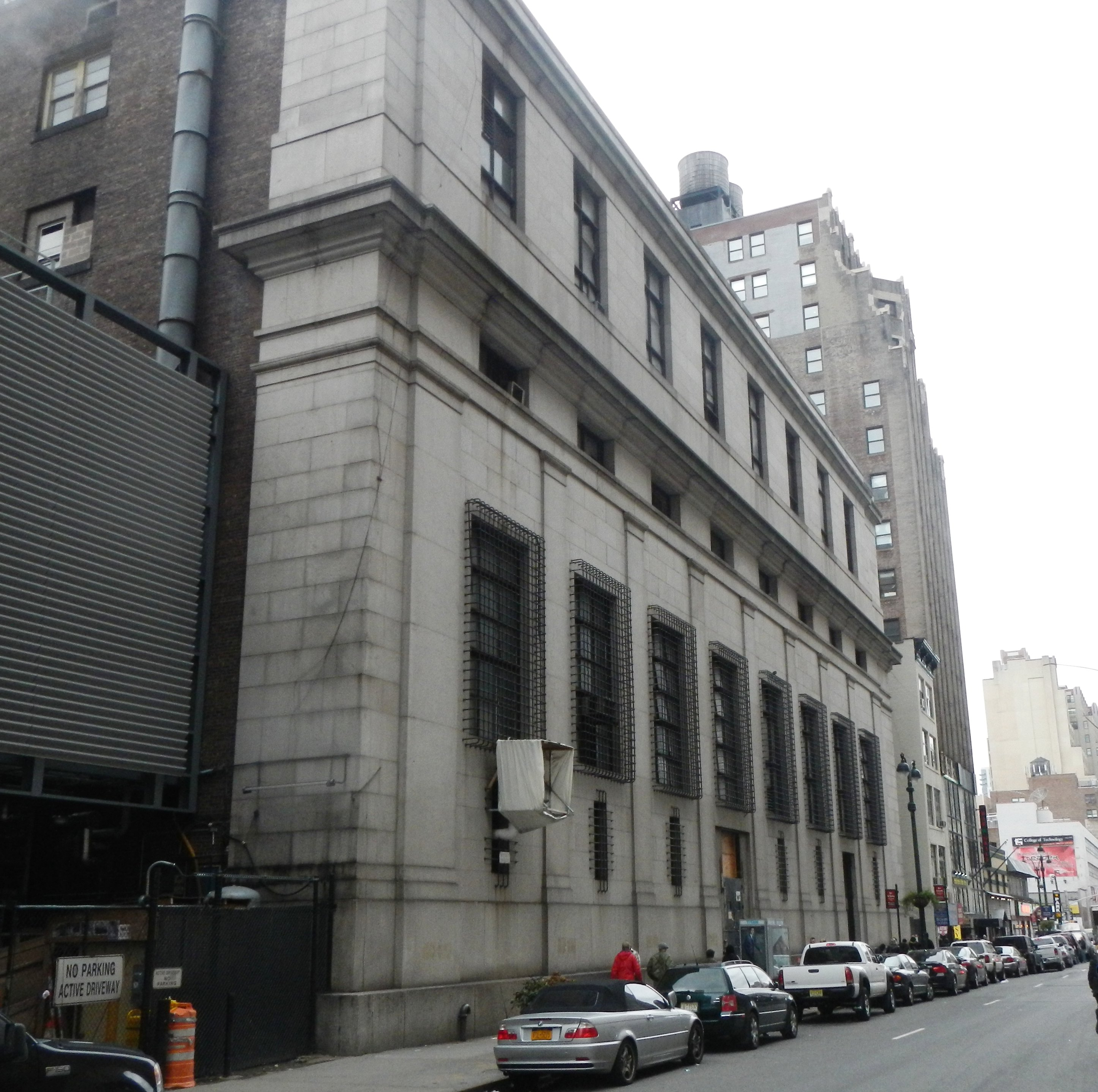
West 31st St., including the New York Terminal Service Plant

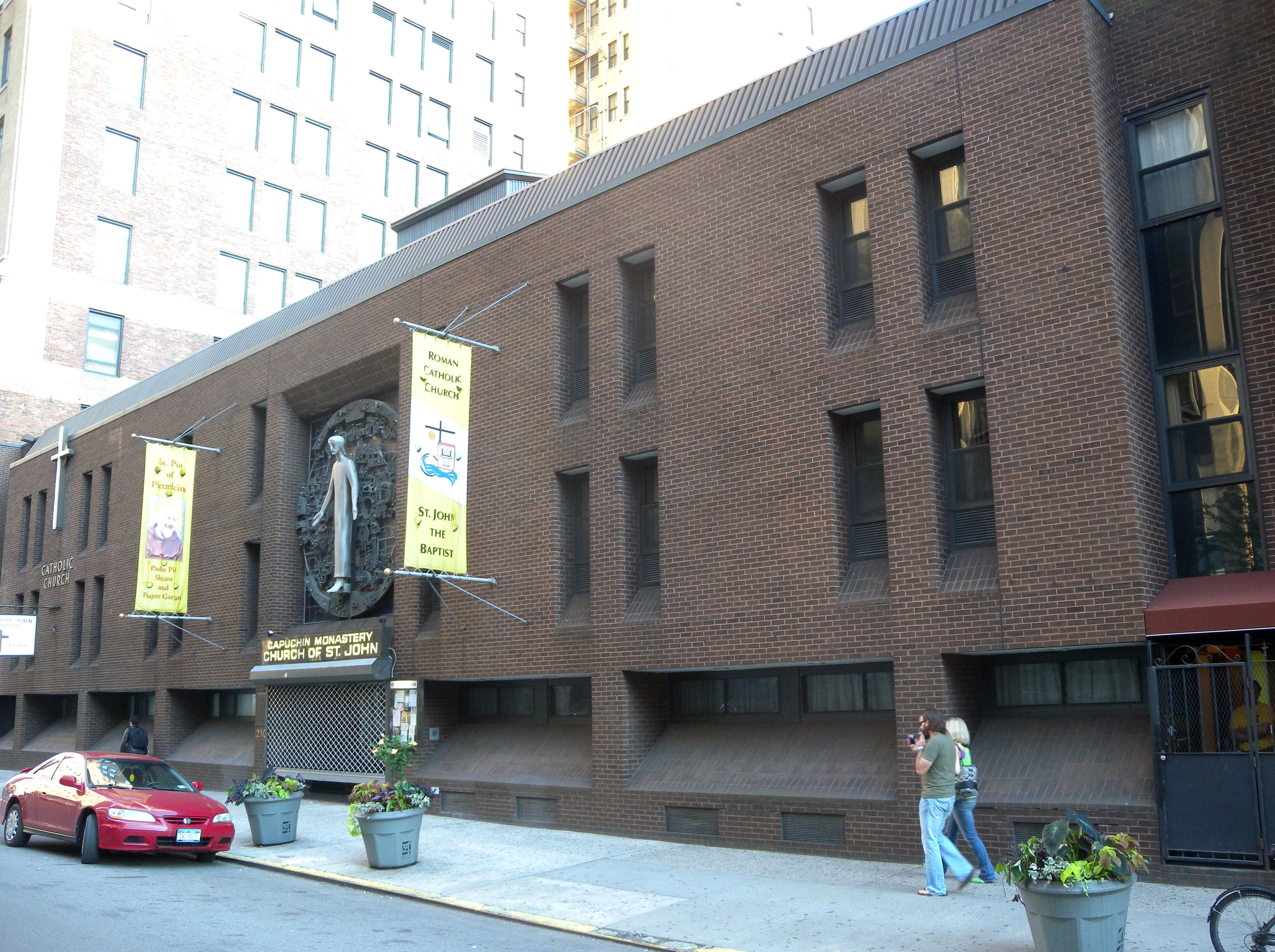
Capuchin Monastery of St John the Baptist, 31st St

Plans call for Penn Station South to be located on the block south of the current New York Penn Station at 31st Street and diagonally across Eighth Avenue from the post office, on land which is currently privately held. While the PANYNJ had been acquiring land for ARC along its route, acquisition south of the station has not begun. It is likely the entire block would be razed and made available for highrise construction after completion of the station. Plans call for seven tracks served by four platforms in what will be a terminal annex to the entire station complex. In April 2011 Amtrak requested $50 million in federal funding for preliminary engineering and environmental analysis.

In 2014, it was estimated that it would cost $404 million to purchase 35 properties in order to build a new terminal at the location. Based on development guidelines from the New York City Planning Commission, it is estimated that at 2015 prices it would cost between $769 million and $1.3 billion to buy the block bounded to the north and south by 31st and 30th streets, and to the east and west by Seventh and Eighth avenues. Real estate prices are 2½ times higher now than they were in 2012 according to prominent real estate firm Cushman & Wakefield.

== Related projects ==
Other projects in the New York metropolitan area are planned as part of the NEC Next Generation High Speed Rail, including the northern and southern approaches to the Gateway Project.

=== New Brunswick–Trenton high-speed upgrade ===
In May 2011, $450 million was dedicated to increase capacity on one of the NEC's busiest segments, a 24-mile (39 km) section between New Brunswick and Trenton, New Jersey. The planned six-year project will upgrade signals and electrical power systems, including catenary wires, to improve reliability, increase train speeds, and allow more frequent high-speed trains. In July 2011, a bill passed by the House of Representatives threatened funding for the project and others announced at the same time, but the money was released the following month. The project, along with the purchase of new train sets, is expected to raise speeds on the segment to 186 mph (299 km/h). In September 2012, Acela test trains hit 165 mph (266 km/h) over the segment. The track work is one of several projects planned for the "New Jersey Speedway" section of the NEC, which include a new station at North Brunswick, the Mid-Line Loop (a flyover for reversing train direction), and the re-construction of County Yard, to be done in coordination with NJT.

=== Harold Interlocking and Hutchinson River ===
Over 750 LIRR, NJT, and Amtrak trains travel through the Harold Interlocking every day, causing frequent conflicts and delays. In May 2011, a $294.7 million federal grant was awarded to address congestion at the USA's busiest rail junction and part of the Sunnyside Yard in Queens. The work will allow for a dedicated track to the New York Connecting Railroad right of way for Amtrak trains arriving from or bound for New England, thus avoiding NJT and LIRR traffic. A new flying junction will allow Amtrak trains to travel through the interlocking separately from LIRR and NJ Transit trains on their way to Sunnyside. Financing for the project was jeopardized when the House of Representatives voted in July 2011 to divert the money to unrelated projects, but funds were later obligated so that work on the project could begin in 2012. Some of the interlocking improvement projects are complete as of early 2023, while several other projects are projected for completion by late 2025.

Amtrak applied in 2011 for $15 million for the environmental impact studies and preliminary engineering design to examine replacement options for the more than 100-year-old, low-level movable Pelham Bay Bridge over the Hutchinson River in the Bronx. The goal is for a new bridge to support expanded service and speeds up to 110 mph (177 km/h). In August 2022, the FRA awarded a $4.5 million grant to Amtrak for the bridge replacement project. In June 2023, Amtrak applied for additional FRA grants to support multiple improvement projects in the Northeast Corridor, including additional work on the Pelham Bay Bridge project.

=== Subway service ===
While not part of the Gateway Project, Amtrak's announcement included a proposal to extend the Metropolitan Transportation Authority (MTA) 7 Subway Extension three blocks east to New York Penn Station from the current station at 11th Avenue and 34th Street. This would provide service to the Javits Convention Center and a one-seat ride to Grand Central Terminal, the city's other major train terminal on the East Side of Manhattan at 42nd Street. Shortly before the introduction of Gateway, the New York City Economic Development Corporation voted to budget up to $250,000 for a feasibility study of a Hudson River tunnel for an extension to Secaucus Junction awarded to Parsons Brinckerhoff, a major engineering firm that had been working on the ARC tunnel. In October 2011, NYC Mayor Michael Bloomberg reiterated his support for the NJ extension, estimated to cost around $10 billion and take ten years to complete, indicating that he would give approval by the end of his third term in 2013. Environmental-impact studies and a full business plan are required before the proposal proceeds. It was likely that the two projects—Gateway and the subway extension—would have been in competition for funding.

In April 2012, citing budget considerations, the director of the MTA effectively scuttled the project and said that it was doubtful the extension would be built in the foreseeable future, suggesting that the Gateway Project was a much more likely solution to congestion at Hudson River crossings. The report was released in April 2013. In a November 2013 Daily News opinion article, the president of the Real Estate Board of New York and the chairman of Edison Properties called for the line to be extended to Secaucus in tunnels to be shared with the Gateway Project. In November 2013, the New Jersey Assembly passed a Resolution 168 supporting the extension of the line to Hoboken and Secaucus.

== See also ==
- Cross-Harbor Rail Tunnel – freight rail project proposed in 1993
- Fehmarn Belt fixed link – the world's longest road and rail tunnel
- High-speed rail in the United States
- Infrastructure policy of Donald Trump
- List of fixed crossings of the North River (Hudson River)
- List of bridges, tunnels, and cuts in Hudson County, New Jersey
- List of bridges and tunnels in New York City
