= Kearny Connection =

Railroad junction in Kearny, New Jersey

Coordinates: 40.7441°N 74.1242°W

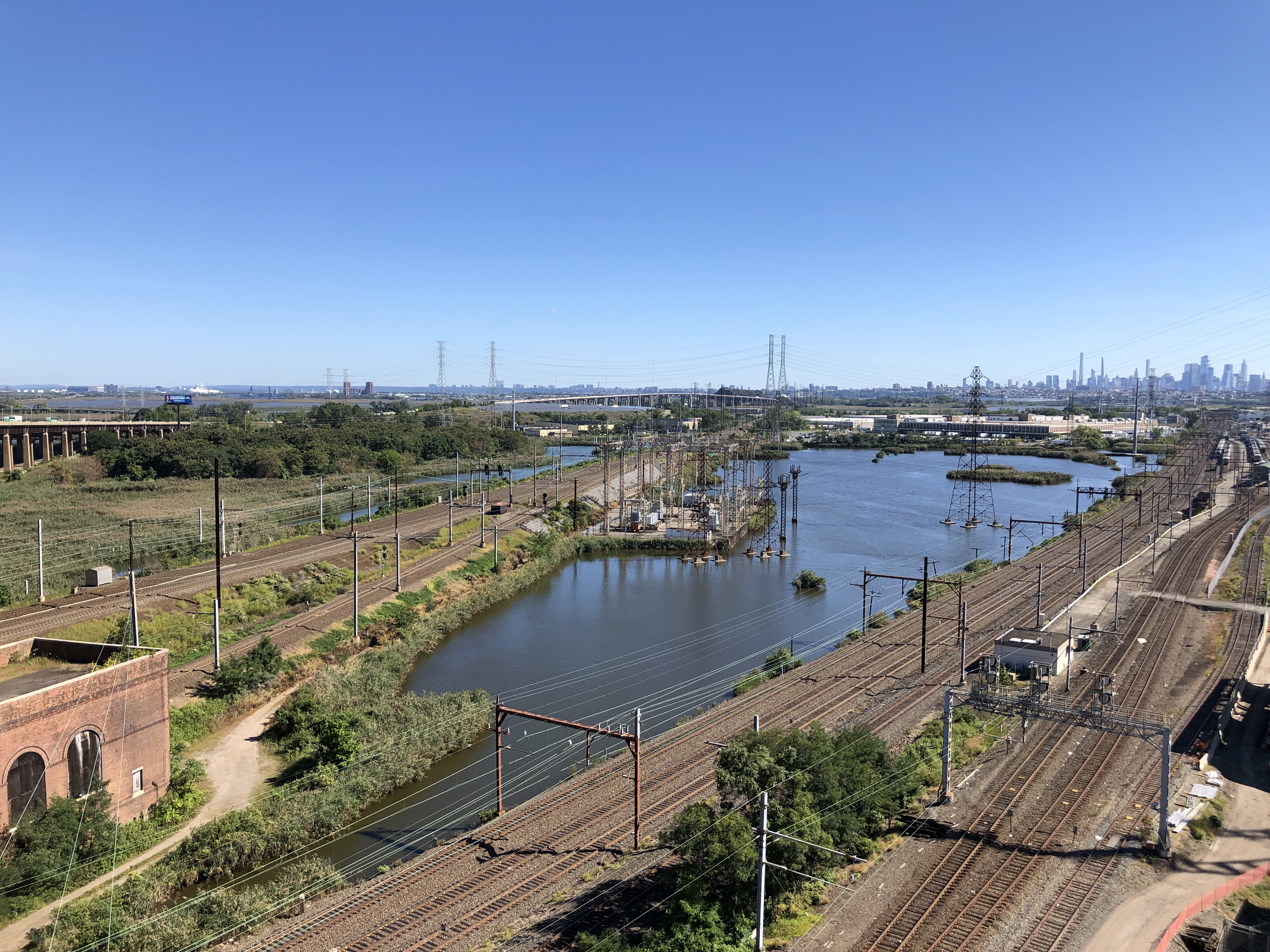
In the Meadowlands from left to right are the NEC, Kearny Connection/Swift Interlocking, the Morris & Essex Lines, and Conrail Center Street Branch

The Kearny Connection is a railroad junction in Kearny, New Jersey that allows passenger trains from New Jersey Transit's Morris and Essex Lines to enter/leave Amtrak's Northeast Corridor (NEC) and travel to and from New York Penn Station. The junction, which opened in 1996, is nearby the Sawtooth Bridges.

== Location and design ==
The Kearny Connection is located west of Secaucus Junction and lies immediately north of the Waterfront Connection which serves to connect Hoboken Division with the NEC. Two tracks, one in each direction, carry trains from the former DL&W main line, which passes under the NEC, onto the NEC. The new junction on the NEC is designated "Swift Interlocking" and is seven miles west of New York.

There is a difference in voltage/frequency between the Northeast Corridor and the Morris and Essex Lines so only electric locomotives and EMUs that can switch between the two electrical systems are able to travel through the junction.

== Predecessors ==
There is precedent for trains from the Morris and Essex lines to route through a connection to a PRR-associated railroad and use its terminal for better access to New York City. The Morris and Essex Railroad, from the time of its arrival in Newark in 1836 until it established its own depot in Hoboken in 1855, built a junction with the New Jersey Rail Road (the Pennsylvania Railroad's predecessor) in Newark, to get to the NJRR's Paulus Hook terminal in Jersey City and its ferries to Manhattan, although this was to the south of Hoboken rather than to the north. To be precise, the junction was with the NJRR's Market Street branch, which joined with the NJRR main line in Newark to cross the Passaic on the Center Street Bridge, then through the Bergen Hill Cut to its Paulus Hook terminal in Jersey City. Nearly all of this has since been removed; the exceptions are tracks for PATH and the P&H through the Bergen Hill Cut, and a small portion of the NJRR mainline east of the former Center Street Bridge (now called the Center Street Branch), but that is now only connected to the M&E albeit further east in Kearny.

== Impact ==
With the opening of service on June 10, 1996, travel time to Midtown, Manhattan was reduced by 20 minutes, eliminating the need for riders to first travel to Hoboken Terminal and transfer to PATH trains for transport under the Hudson River. New Jersey Transit dubbed the new service Midtown Direct. By the 2000s, of 138 inbound and 150 outbound daily weekday trains on the three Morris and Essex Lines, 73 inbound and 71 outbound trains (about 50%) use the Kearny Connection.

The project's construction took three years, and $70 million to complete. The reduced commute times and the "one-seat" commute provided by the Kearny Connection increased ridership on the Morris and Essex Lines and increased residential property prices along the line. In 2010, it was estimated that the state of New Jersey collected hundreds of millions of dollars annually in additional property tax revenue due to the increased property prices along the Morris and Essex Lines.

The Kearny Connection's popularity and success led to other transportation improvements such as the opening of the Secaucus Junction station seven years later. Additional attempts to create "one-seat" commutes to Midtown for riders from the Raritan Valley Line and the Montclair-Boonton Line using dual-mode Bombardier ALP-45DP locomotives have been stalled due to rush-hour capacity issues at Penn Station in New York. A proposal for "one-seat" commutes to Penn Station for Pascack Valley Line, Main Line and Bergen County Line riders via a loop at the Secaucus Junction station is part of the Gateway Project plan but faces criticism due to the existing overcrowding at Penn Station.
