= Harrison station (PATH) =

Port Authority Trans-Hudson rail station

Harrison
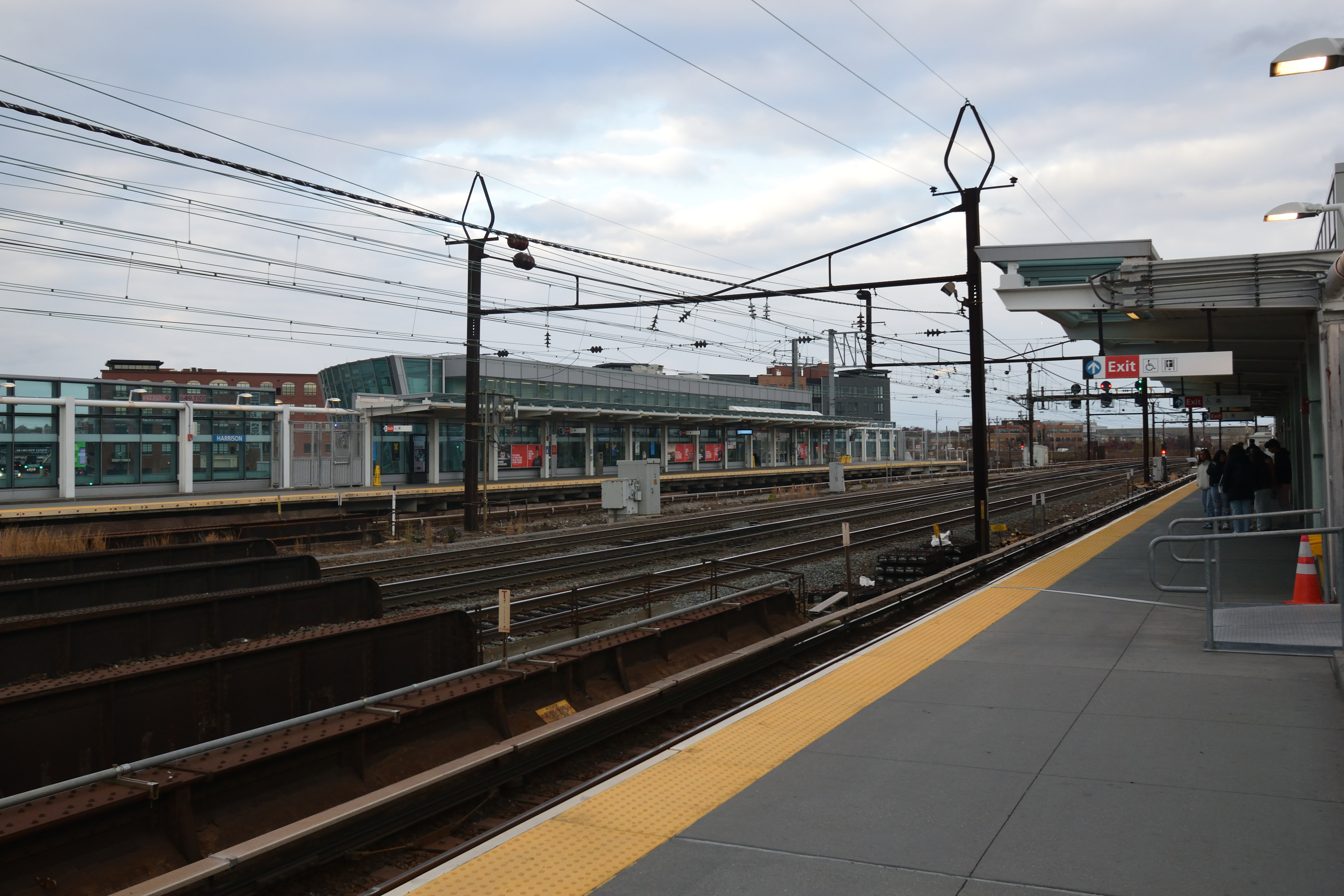
- Harrison station in 2024

General information
- Location: 913 Frank E. Rodgers Boulevard South; Harrison, New Jersey
- Coordinates: 40.739187°N 74.155425°W
- Owner: Port Authority of New York and New Jersey
- Line: Northeast Corridor
- Platforms: 2 side platforms
- Tracks: 2 (PATH), 3 (Northeast Corridor)
- Connections: NJ Transit Bus: 40

Construction
- Parking: Paid parking nearby
- Accessible: Yes

History
- Opened: 1937
- Rebuilt: October 30, 2018 (westbound); June 15, 2019 (eastbound)

Passengers
- 2025: 2,036,042 ▲6.1%
- Rank: 9 of 13

Services
Preceding station	PATH	Following station
Newark Terminus	NWK–WTC	Journal Square toward World Trade Center
Former services
Preceding station	Hudson and Manhattan Railroad	Following station
Park Place Terminus	Park Place–Hudson Terminal	Manhattan Transfer toward Hudson Terminal
Preceding station	Pennsylvania Railroad	Following station
Newark Market Street toward New Brunswick	New Brunswick Line Until 1910s	Manhattan Transfer toward Exchange Place
Track layout
Location

Harrison station is a station on the PATH system. Located on Frank E. Rodgers Boulevard (County Route 697) between I-280 and the Passaic River in Harrison, New Jersey, it is served by the Newark–World Trade Center line at all times. The station's two side platforms are on the outside of the Northeast Corridor's three tracks.

The station opened in 1911 as part of the extension of the Hudson and Manhattan Railroad to Newark–Park Place, and was relocated in 1937. It was rebuilt in the late 2010s and early 2020s.

== History ==
On November 26, 1911, the Hudson and Manhattan Railroad (H&M) began running from Manhattan Transfer to Newark–Park Place, stopping at Harrison station at the intersection of Fourth Street (now Frank E. Rodgers Boulevard South) and New Jersey Railroad Avenue, three blocks north of the present station. The H&M used an elevated right-of-way above the Pennsylvania Railroad's Center Street Branch.

The station moved to a new location on June 20, 1937, when the H&M was realigned southward from Park Place to Newark Penn Station.

Both Harrison stations were part of a joint operation of the PRR and the H&M under the legal name "Joint Service Electric Railroad", which required a separate or surcharge fare. Beside H&M service, Harrison also served the PRR-owned New York and Long Branch Railroad line, which was partially owned by the Central Railroad of New Jersey south of Perth Amboy, and ran as far east as Exchange Place Terminal in Jersey City. Hudson and Manhattan Railroad was bought by the Port Authority of New York and New Jersey in 1962 and renamed Port Authority Trans-Hudson, but the 1937-built H&M/PRR depot remained intact.

=== Reconstruction ===
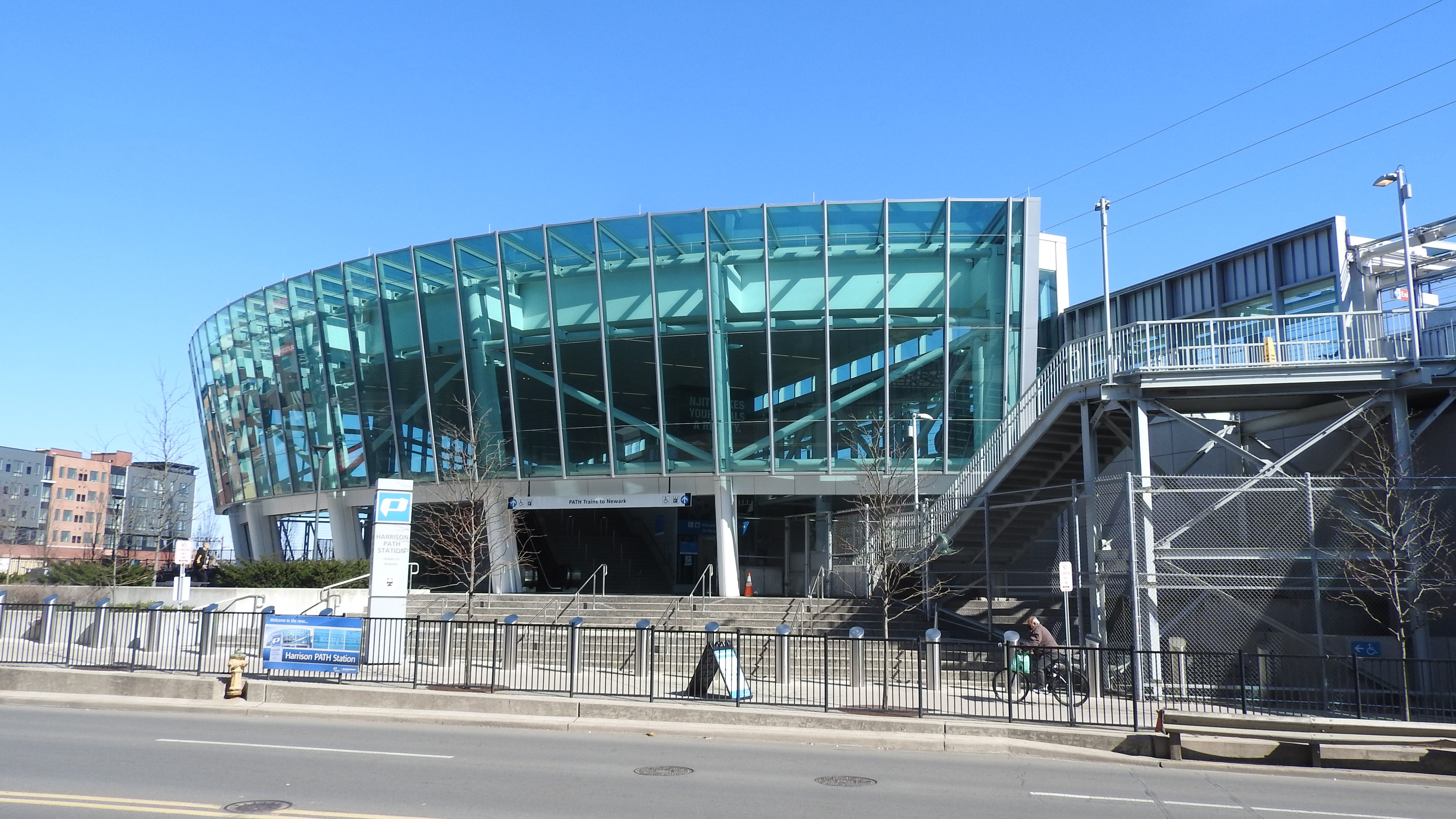
New northern (Newark-bound) entrance in March 2023

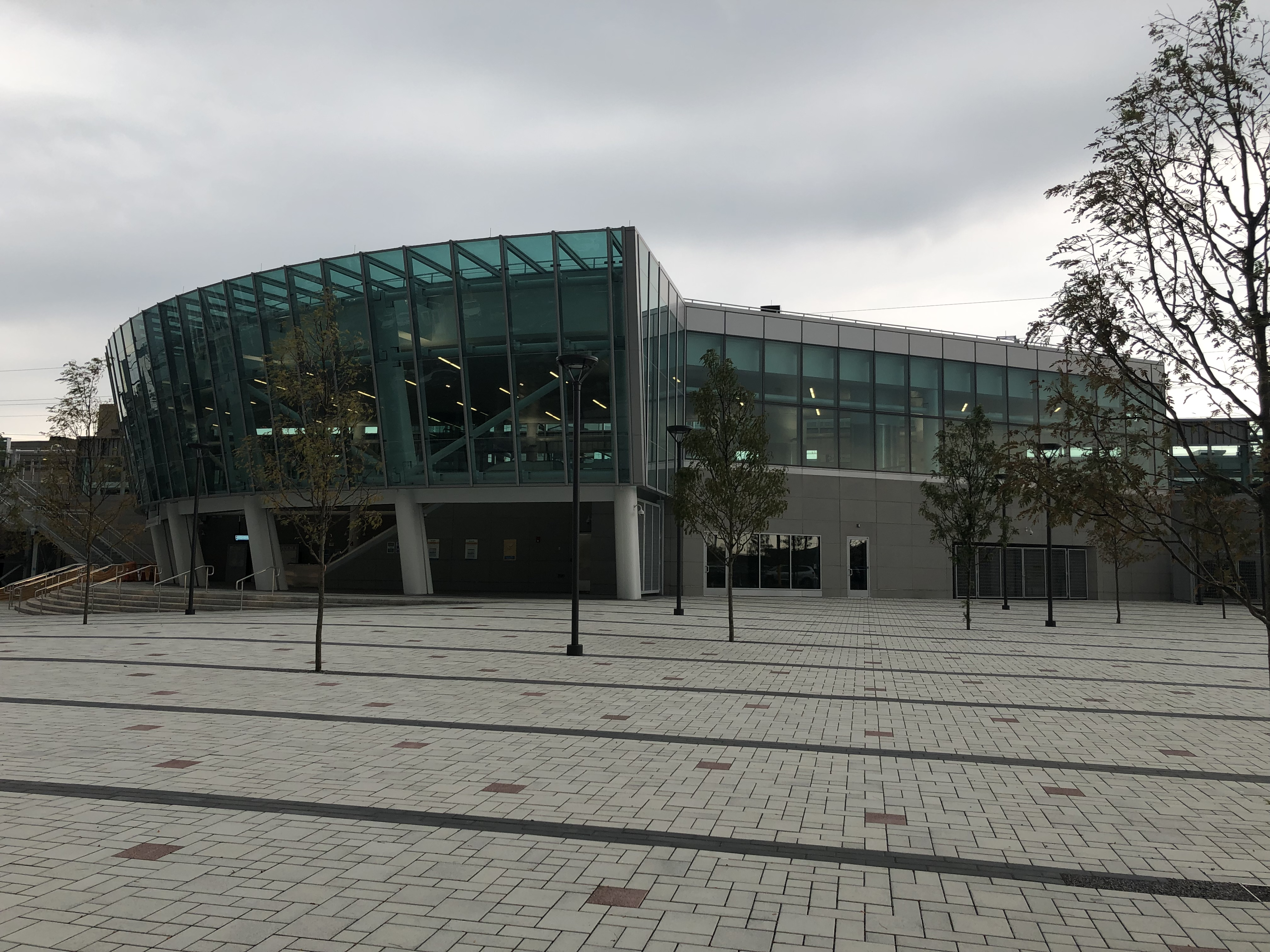
New southern (WTC-bound) entrance in August 2019

The area around the station has undergone redevelopment since the early 2000s. The first phase of a mixed-use development called Harrison Station opened in December 2011. Meanwhile, the Port Authority began reconstructing the station in 2009. The $256 million project essentially rebuilt the station because the original structure's architecture could not easily be updated. The station has longer and wider platforms to allow 10-car trains; street-level-to-platform elevators within the platform extensions, in compliance with the Americans with Disabilities Act of 1990; and architectural modifications to its appearance. Funding for this project was provided by a portion of the March 2008 toll and fare hike, which increased the overall spending budget of the corporation. In 2011, the Port Authority began acquiring real property in preparation for construction.

In 2012, a parking garage opened adjacent to the Newark-bound platform and the entrance/exit was rebuilt with a modern, glass walled enclosure. A new staircase facing the opposite direction from the original goes down to a small plaza with bike racks outside the garage. The major reconstruction was approved on March 28, 2012, and construction started in January 2013. The Port Authority had originally planned to finish construction by April 2017. The start of construction was celebrated by Gov. Chris Christie, Mayor Raymond McDonough and Port Authority Executive Director Bill Baroni on August 16, 2013. The completion target was tentatively moved to 2018, and settling a required right-of-way renewal agreement with Amtrak may delay the completion further. Work on the station continued even in the absence of an agreement. The renovation and expansion of the station will also accommodate large crowds of spectators taking the PATH for sporting events held at nearby Sports Illustrated Stadium, home of Major League Soccer (MLS) club New York Red Bulls.

The westbound platform of the new station opened to the public on October 30, 2018. On June 15, 2019, the eastbound head house and platform of the new station opened to the public completing the first two of the four-phase project of the station reconstruction. Following the new eastbound platform's opening, the older existing entrances on the west side of Frank E. Rodgers Boulevard were expected to be demolished by December 2019 for the third phase to make way for similar new headhouses, but no action was taken until April 12, 2021, when the Pennsylvania Railroad station headhouse to the eastbound platform was closed and subsequently demolished.

On February 21, 2024, the new eastbound station's headhouse was completed and opened to the public, thus completing the project for the modernization of the station. The new 3,200 sq ft (297 m^{2}) station house cost $47.2 million, and includes many modernization and accessibility upgrades, including an elevator, public plaza with seating, 82 bicycle parking spots, and a dedicated turnstile. Additionally, the new facility has enhanced flood protection from the Passaic River, with the house being above the floodplain and water runoff being collected and stored in water retention tanks for irrigation. The new facility allows for pedestrian access without needing to cross the street.

== Station layout ==
This station is located on the Northeast Corridor. It has two side platforms and five tracks. Only the side tracks serving the PATH platforms have third rail power; the three center tracks, with overhead catenary wires, are used by passing Amtrak and New Jersey Transit's Raritan Valley Line, Northeast Corridor Line and North Jersey Coast Line trains.

The platforms have low tubular fencing along their extreme ends and a wooden canopy held up by metal posts toward their midsection. Each platform has its own entrance/exit to the west side of Frank E. Rogers Boulevard and there are no crossovers or crossunders. The Newark-bound platform has an additional entrance/exit on the east side of the boulevard, and a similar entrance/exit was built for the New York-bound platform.

The Newark-bound platform entrance on the west side of Frank E. Rodgers Boulevard is under a roll-up steel gate. It leads to a small, modern fare control area with smart card turnstiles, installed here and at all other PATH stations in January 2005. Before then, passengers could take the short ride to Newark for free (trains discharge and pick up passengers at different fare-control areas in Newark Penn Station, so fare beating to New York was not possible). These six turnstiles lead past a Ticket Vending Machine and another machine for two trip PATH MetroCards to a covered staircase. This staircase goes down to an intermediate landing where another staircase turns right and goes down to the street. A new staircase facing the opposite direction from the original goes down to a small plaza with bike racks outside the parking garage.

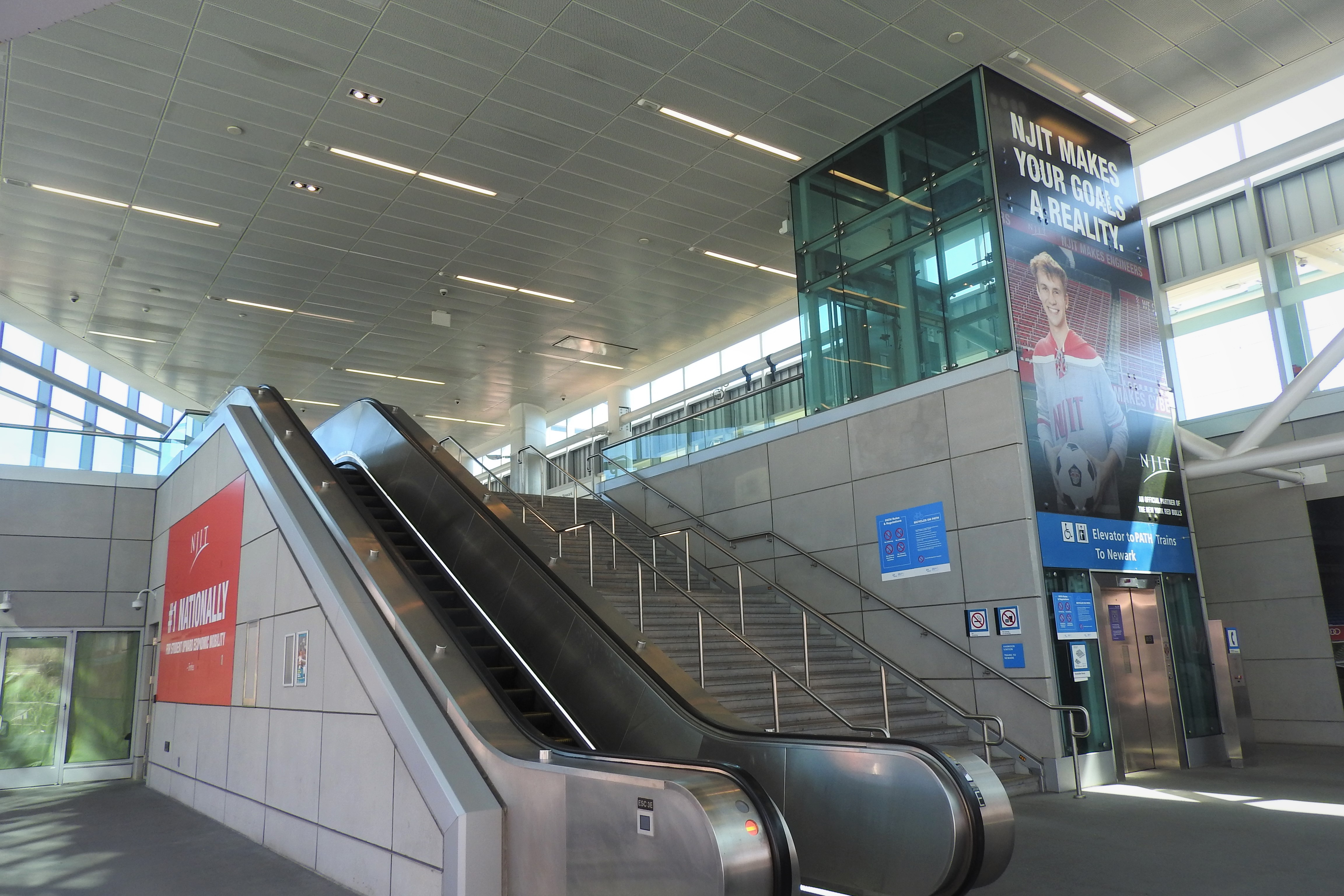
North (westbound) lobby of Harrison Station

The former entrance to the New York-bound platform was inside a 1930s brick building. It had a circular awning that covers two blue doors. Above this awning was a window to allow natural light in followed by a concrete etching of the Pennsylvania Railroad logo and was a reflection of the Hudson and Manhattan Railroad former joint operated with the Pennsylvania Railroad between Journal Square (then called Summit Avenue) and Newark. Above this was a station's name and ornate clock, although the latter was removed at an unknown point. Inside the building were two more doors at a split. These two areas lead to separate banks of turnstiles that lead to an enclosed staircase up to platform level, where there was a small, enclosed waiting area with benches before doors lead out to the back of the platform. As part of ongoing renovations at the station, the 1930's entrance was closed, demolished and will be replaced.

The 2018–2019 entrances on the east side of Frank E. Rodgers Boulevard contain separate semicircular glass headhouses for each platform. The Newark-bound headhouse opened to passengers on October 30, 2018, and the New York-bound headhouse opened to passengers on June 15, 2019. The headhouses curve outward toward plazas on the street. Each headhouse's ceiling is around three stories above ground level, creating an airy and open effect. Directly inside each headhouse is an escalator, a set of double-wide stairs, and an elevator leading to each respective platform level. The turnstiles are located at platform level, and there is no free transfer between directions.
