= Waterfront Connection =

Rail junction in USA

Coordinates: 40.7435°N 74.1267°W

The Waterfront Connection allows NJ Transit trains to switch from the former Pennsylvania Railroad main line (now the Newark Division) to the former Delaware, Lackawanna and Western Railroad main line, now NJ Transit Rail Operations. The connection opened on September 9, 1991, at a cost of $16 million.

== Location and design ==
The connection consists of a single track that splits from the Northeast Corridor main line to New York Penn Station as it rises to go over the main line of NJ Transit Rail Operations to Hoboken. The connection rises to the east with a bridge over PATH's westbound track and a Conrail freight line, merging into the Hoboken line from the south. The red through-girder bridge here was built for it; for its first 10+ years it was not electrified. The Waterfront Connection lies immediately south of the Kearny Connection, and serves the complementary purpose. The two connections allow any trains originating from the west of Kearny, regardless of line, to terminate at either Hoboken or New York Penn Station.

== Usage ==
For years, the only train that uses the waterfront connection is a single inbound morning Raritan Valley Line train to Hoboken, North Jersey Coast Line trains previously used the connection to reach Hoboken with five rush hour trains in each direction originating/terminating at Hoboken. However since 2020 all trains to and from Hoboken on the North Jersey Coast Line have been cancelled and now originate and terminate exclusively at New York Penn Station. Since August 30, 2026, when NJT updated their schedules, train 2406, the only revenue train using the Waterfront connection, was cut, and replaced by train 5406, now terminating at Newark Penn Station. This train still continues to Hoboken as a non-revenue train, and returns to Newark Penn as a non-revenue later the same day. The Waterfront Connection allows diesel trains to operate direct from Hoboken to Bay Head, the last stop on the North Jersey Coast Line. Since the North Jersey Coast Line's electrification ends at Long Branch, rush hour passengers south of Long Branch can take diesel trains all the way to Hoboken or change at Newark Penn Station for service to New York City. As of 2015, the ALP-45DP has allowed the introduction of one-seat rides from New York Penn Station all the way to Bay Head.

== Impact ==
With the advent of the Waterfront Connection, NJ Transit no longer needed a separate fueling facility on the diesel portion of the North Jersey Coast Line since diesel engines can make the trip directly to Hoboken. Faced with pressure from Bay Head residents in 2002, the Bay Head fueling facility was shut down and trains now refuel exclusively at Hoboken or at Raritan Yard.

== Predecessor ==
As part of NJ Transit's "Bergen Shore Express" summer promotion 1986–1988, NJ Transit Rail Operations trains from the Bergen County Line turned southwest at West End Junction onto the Morris & Essex line, switched onto the Center Street Branch, PATH tracks, and then the Northeast Corridor to head for the North Jersey Coast Line. The switches that allowed this have since all been removed.

== Proposed expansion and reconfiguration ==
The current single track connection handles both eastbound and westbound trains. However, westbound trains must make an at grade crossing over two Northeast Corridor tracks in order to be on the correct track. This can create congestion at Dock Interlocking. NJ Transit has proposed building another flyover track, known as the Westbound Waterfront Connector in plans, in order to overcome this limitation. However, the project has not been fully funded.
