= Center Street Branch =

Overview
- Locale: Hudson County, New Jersey
- Stations: 0

Technical
- Track gauge: 1,435 mm (4 ft 8 1/2 in) standard gauge

The Center Street Branch, formerly known as the Centre Street Branch, is a short railway line in Harrison and Kearny, New Jersey. It was formerly the main line of the New Jersey Railroad between Jersey City and Newark, before the building of a new crossing of the Passaic River reduced its importance. Today, its remaining trackage is an industrial freight line owned and operated Conrail Shared Assets Operations that serves to connect the Passaic and Harsimus Line and the Morristown Line.

== History ==
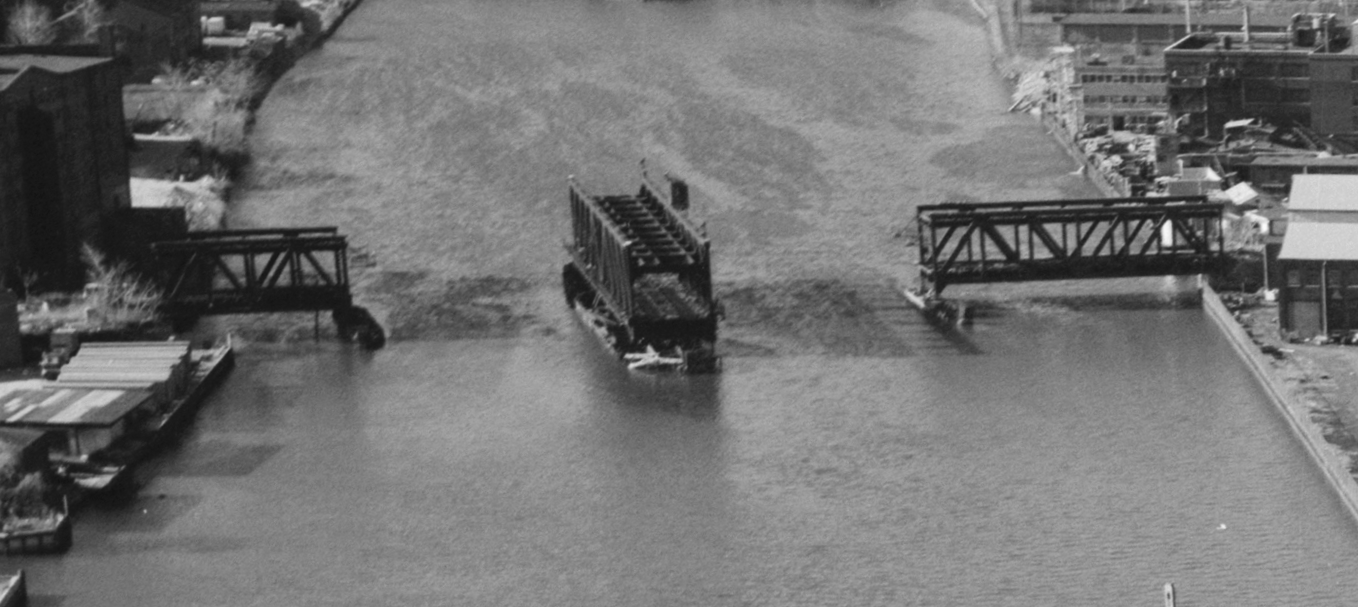
Center Street Bridge in 1974, subsequently removed

The New Jersey Railroad and Transportation Company was incorporated on March 7, 1832, to build a line from Jersey City, New Jersey, to New Brunswick, New Jersey. The line opened between Jersey City and Newark, New Jersey, on September 15, 1834. This initial segment crossed two rivers: the Hackensack River, and the Passaic River in Newark. The railroad had planned to cross the Passaic at Market Street, near the commercial dock, but objections from shipping interests forced the railroad to cross at Centre Street, some 2,000 feet (610 m) upriver. This relocation meant that trains passing over the line had to make a sharp turn in Newark, and then again in Harrison, New Jersey, after crossing.

The New Jersey Legislature authorized the construction of a bridge over the Passaic at Market Street in 1855, but subsequent litigation held up the start of construction until 1862. The new bridge opened in 1869, and the main line of the New Jersey Railroad was re-routed, avoiding the curves of the original route. The original route in Newark and Harrison, approximately 1.34 miles (2.16 km) long, was retained as the Center Street Branch.

In 1872, the New Jersey Railroad and Transportation Company was consolidated with the Camden and Amboy Railroad and the Delaware and Raritan Canal Company to form the United New Jersey Railroad and Canal Company, which was leased by the Pennsylvania Railroad. The United New Jersey Railroad and Canal Company continued to exist on paper, and remained the owner of the line until the creation of Conrail in 1976.

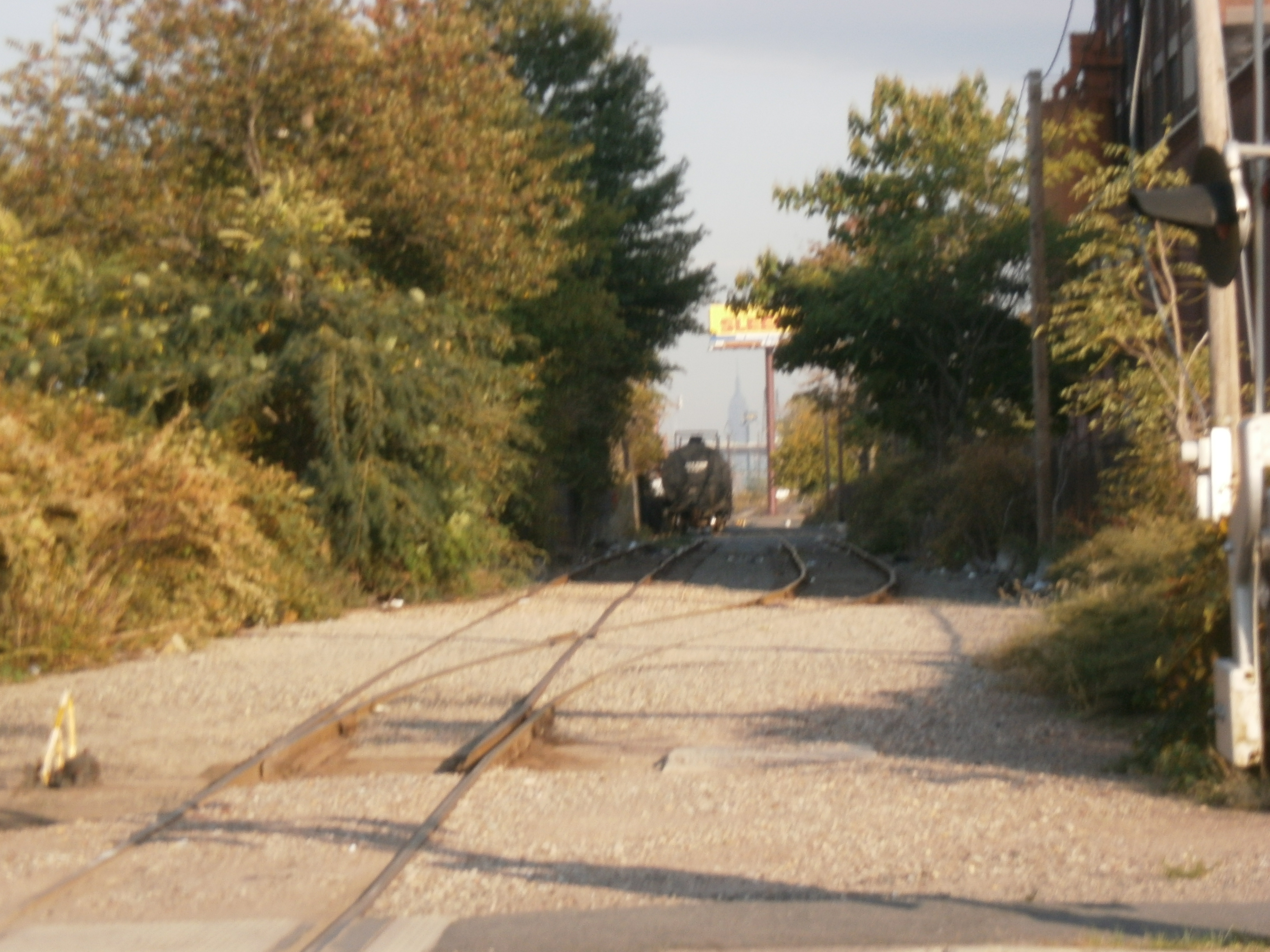
ROW in Harrison looking east (2011)

The Pennsylvania Railroad continued to maintain a freight station on River Street in Newark, immediately west of the new main line and the Market Street passenger station. The elevation of the main line through Newark in 1904 eliminated the connection on the western end. The Center Street Bridge over the Passaic was rebuilt as a double-deck bridge in 1911 to accommodate the electric rapid transit trains of the Hudson and Manhattan Railroad (now PATH), which traveled over an elevated right-of-way from Manhattan Transfer to Park Place station, a block southwest of the Center Street Branch tracks. The new Pennsylvania Station in Newark opened in 1935, replacing Market Street station, and the Hudson and Manhattan moved its Newark terminus there in 1937 with the closure of Manhattan Transfer. The upper span was rebuilt to handle road traffic and for a time was designated as New Jersey Route 158.

Prior to 1976, service over the bridge was abandoned leaving the track in Harrison as the remainder of the line. This was conveyed to Conrail in 1976, following the Penn Central Transportation bankruptcy. The Center Street Branch remained part of Conrail Shared Assets Operations after the 1999 Conrail split.

In 2026, much of the abandoned trackage, running through parking lots, along New Jersey Railroad Avenue was torn up.
