= Venus and Cupid (Gentileschi) =

Painting by Artemisia Gentileschi

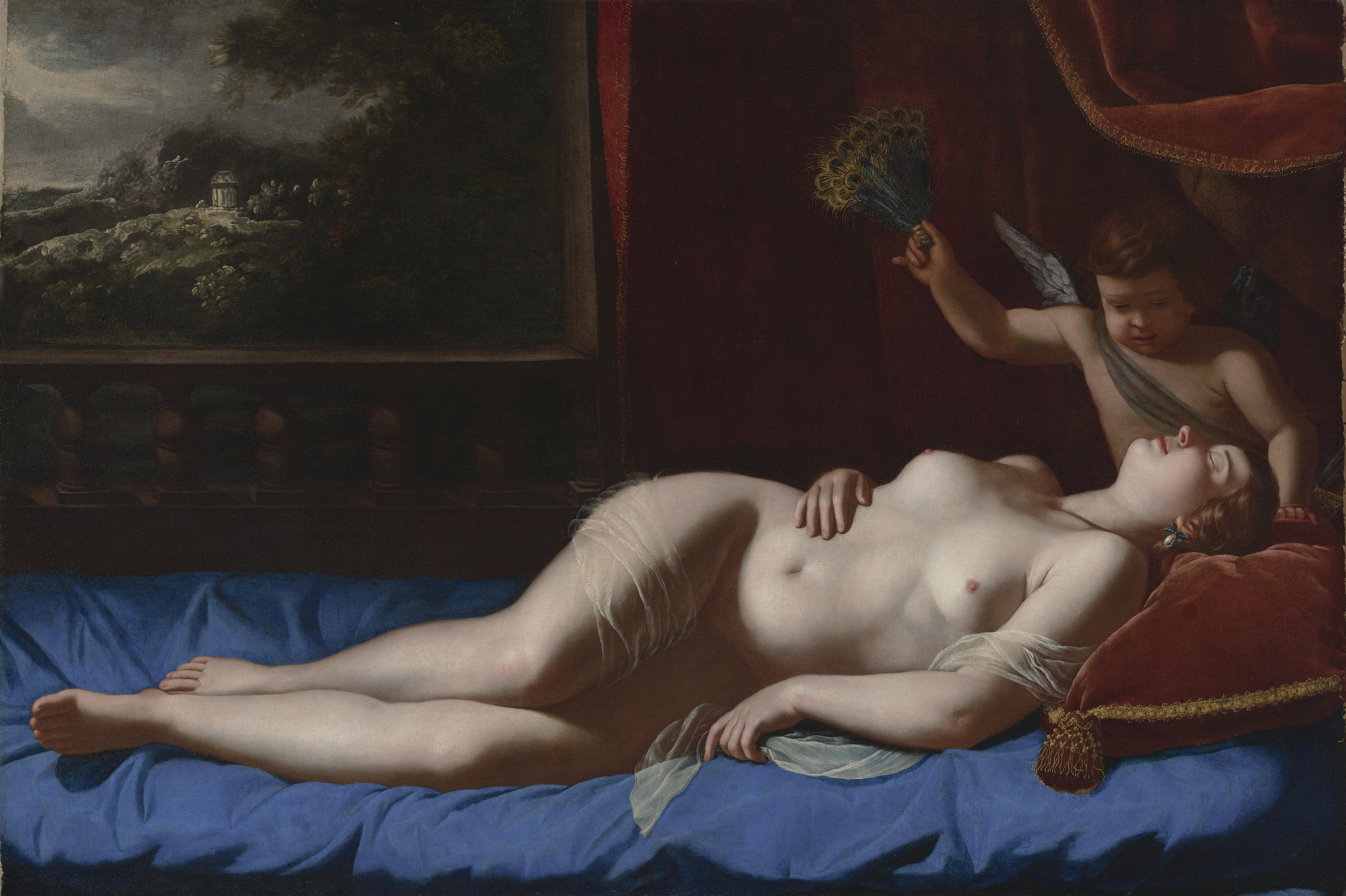
- Artist: Artemisia Gentileschi
- Year: c. 1625-1630
- Medium: Oil on canvas
- Dimensions: 96.5 cm × 143.8 cm (38.0 in × 56.6 in)
- Location: Virginia Museum of Fine Arts; Richmond, U.S.

Venus and Cupid (Sleeping Venus) is a c. 1626 painting by Artemisia Gentileschi in the Virginia Museum of Fine Arts. Venus and Cupid is a depiction of a sleeping Venus, who reclines on a blue bed covering, with her head resting on a rich crimson and gold tasseled pillow. She wears nothing except a thin wisp of transparent linen around her thigh. Her son Cupid fans her with richly colored peacock feathers as she drifts to sleep. He is gazing at her with an adoring, rapturous expression. In the background, there is a window looking out onto a moonlight landscape where a temple to the goddess lies. Venus's face has full cheeks, heavy lids, a prominent nose, and small protruding chin—all features of Gentileschi's own face. The body movements are natural: Venus's hand rests lightly on her side, her legs are gently laid together. The work blends together realism and classicism through its iconography and the artist's style.

The painting was probably commissioned by an important and wealthy patron; Gentileschi painted the blue sheets on the canvas using two layers of lapis lazuli, an expensive material for artists to obtain. The depiction of a slumbering and vulnerable female, in contrast to her earlier works, is thought to indicate her willingness to adapt her style to the demands of patrons. It is possible that a second artist was commissioned to paint the landscape at the top left of the painting.

The painting was first documented in a private collection in Rome in the 1980s. It was then acquired by the Barbera Piasecka Foundation, Princeton, New Jersey. It was later acquired by the Adolph D. and Wilkins C. Williams Foundation who gifted it to the museum.

== Interpretation ==
Art historian Udo Kultermann places Venus and Cupid within a long tradition of sleeping female nudes that extends from ancient representations through the Renaissance, comparing this painting to works by other artists at the time. He notes that Gentileschi's painting is unusual because it is a rare example of a woman artist adopting the sleeping female nude motif. He further argues that the composition heightens the sense of intimacy and voyeurism that was typical for the subject matter. The viewer is made aware of the indiscretion of looking at a vulnerable, sleeping goddess.

More recent scholarship has emphasized the painting's balance between an erotic display and a sacred, protective space. Addison Cucchiaro describes the figure as a "goddess at rest". The deep blue ultramarine bedding painted with expensive pigments and the temple landscape in the background are elements that are believed to frame Venus as a divine, protected presence versus an object of desire. From this perspective, Gentileschi's version of the sleeping Venus both participates in and reimagines traditional uses of the sleeping female nude.

== See also ==
- List of works by Artemisia Gentileschi

== Sources ==
- Bissell, R. Ward (1999). Artemisia Gentileschi and the Authority of Art : Critical Reading and Catalogue Raisonné. University Park, Pa.: Pennsylvania State University Press. ISBN 9780271017877.
- Christiansen, Keith; Mann, Judith Walker (2001). Orazio and Artemisia Gentileschi. New York; New Haven: Metropolitan Museum of Art; Yale University Press. ISBN 1588390063.
- Grabski, Józef (1985). "On Seicento Painting in Naples: Some Observations on Bernardo Cavallino, Artemisia Gentileschi and Others". Artibus et Historiae. 6 (11): 23–63. doi:10.2307/1483259. ISSN 0391-9064. JSTOR 1483259.
- Kultermann, Udo (1990). "Woman Asleep and the Artist". Artibus et Historiae. 11 (22): 129–161. doi:10.2307/1483403. ISSN 0391-9064. JSTOR 1483403.
- Mann, Judith (2005). Artemisia Gentileschi : taking stock. Turnhout, Belgium: Brepols. ISBN 9782503515076.
- Strinati, Claudio; Pomeroy, Jordana (2007). Italian women artists : from Renaissance to Baroque (1st ed.). Milano: Skira. ISBN 978-8876249198.
- Vigué, Jordi (2002). Great Women Masters of Art. New York: Watson-Guptill. ISBN 0823021149.
