= Fulton Street station (New York City Subway) =

New York City Subway station in Manhattan

Fulton Street
- New York City Subway station complex
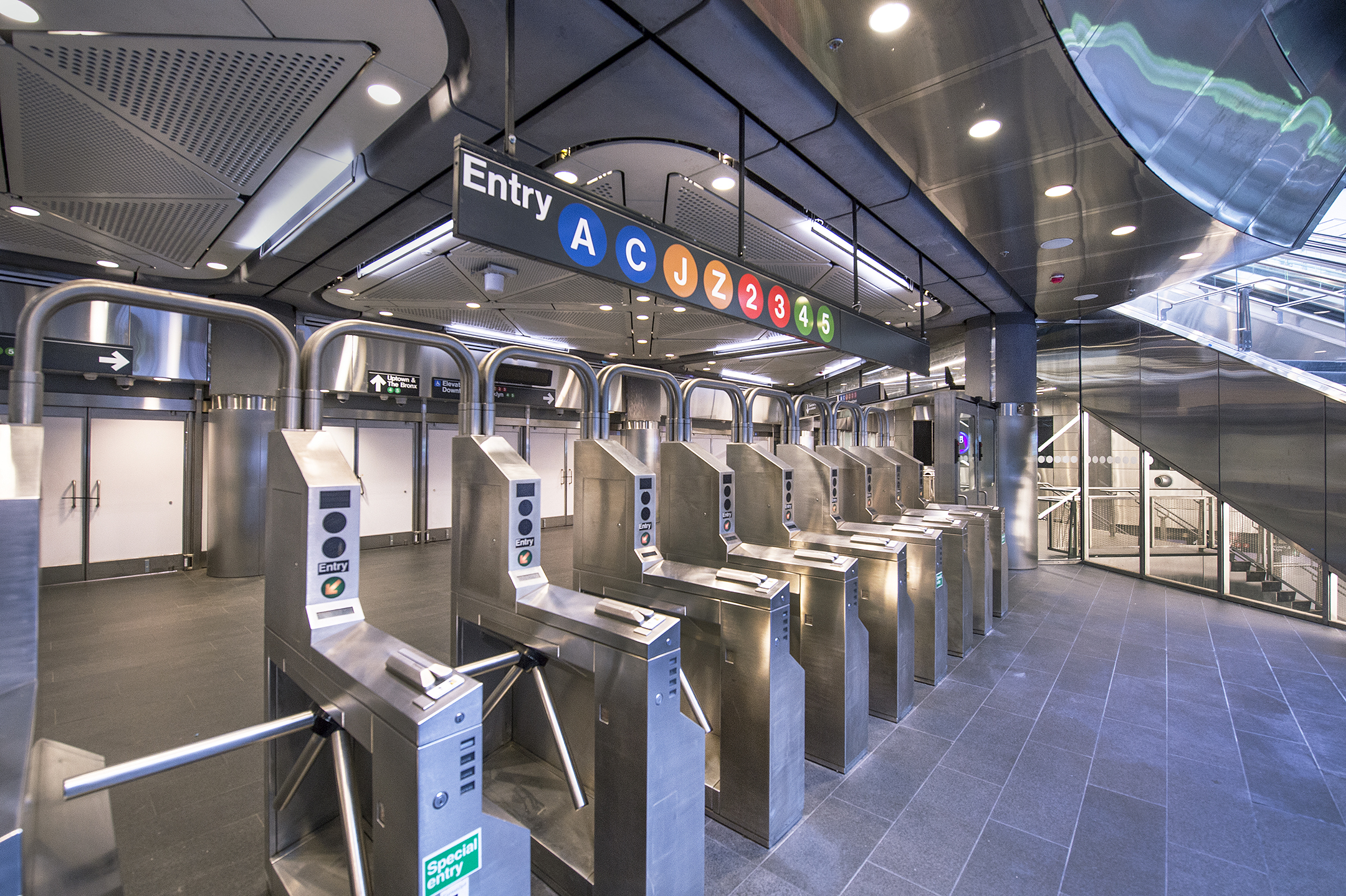
- Turnstiles in the Fulton Center building, one of the station's entrances

Station statistics
- Address: Fulton Street between Broadway & Nassau Street; New York, New York
- Borough: Manhattan
- Locale: Financial District
- Coordinates: 40°42′37″N 74°00′28″W
- Division: A (IRT), B (BMT, IND)
- Line: IND Eighth Avenue Line; IRT Broadway–Seventh Avenue Line; IRT Lexington Avenue Line; BMT Nassau Street Line
- Services: 2 (all times); 3 (all except late nights); 4 (all times); 5 (all except late nights); A (all times); C (all except late nights); J (all times); Z (rush hours, peak direction)
- Transit: NYCT Bus: M55, SIM1, SIM2, SIM4, SIM32, SIM34, X27, X28; At Chambers Street–World Trade Center/Park Place/Cortlandt Street via Fulton Center: 2 (all times); 3 (all except late nights); A (all times); C (all except late nights); E (all times); N (late nights); R (all except late nights); W (weekdays only)
- Structure: Underground
- Levels: 3 (Eighth Avenue Line platforms intersect the other 3 lines; Nassau Street platforms are on 2 levels)

Other information
- Opened: Transfer between IND Eighth Avenue Line, BMT Nassau Street, and IRT Broadway–Seventh Avenue Line: July 1, 1948; 78 years ago Transfer to IRT Lexington Avenue Line: August 25, 1950; 76 years ago
- Accessible: Yes

Traffic
- 2025: 20,471,840 ▲7%
- Rank: 5 out of 423
Location
Location within New York City Subway
Location within New York City
Location within New York
Street map
Station service legend
Symbol	Description
Stops all times except late nights	Stops all times except late nights
Stops all times	Stops all times
Stops rush hours in the peak direction only	Stops rush hours in the peak direction only

The Fulton Street station is a major New York City Subway station complex in Lower Manhattan. It consists of four linked stations on the IND Eighth Avenue Line, the IRT Lexington Avenue Line, the BMT Nassau Street Line and the IRT Broadway–Seventh Avenue Line. The complex is served by the 2, 4, A, and J trains at all times. The 3, 5, and C trains stop here at all times except late nights, and the Z stops during rush hours in the peak direction.

The Lexington Avenue Line station was built for the Interborough Rapid Transit Company (IRT) as part of the city's first subway line, and opened on January 16, 1905. The Broadway–Seventh Avenue Line station, built for the IRT as part of the Dual Contracts, opened on July 1, 1918. The Brooklyn–Manhattan Transit Corporation (BMT)'s Nassau Street Line station was also built under the Dual Contracts and opened on May 29, 1931. The Independent Subway System (IND)'s Eighth Avenue Line station, originally known as the Broadway–Nassau Street station, was the latest in the complex to be completed, opening on February 1, 1933. Several modifications have been made to the stations over the years, and they were connected within a single fare control area in 1948. The station was renovated during the 2000s and early 2010s, becoming part of the Fulton Center complex, which opened in 2014.

The Lexington Avenue, Nassau Street, and Broadway–Seventh Avenue Line stations run north–south under Broadway, Nassau Street, and William Street respectively. The Eighth Avenue Line station is underneath Fulton Street, running west–east between Broadway and Nassau Streets. The Lexington Avenue and Nassau Street Line stations both have two tracks and two side platforms, while the Broadway–Seventh Avenue and Eighth Avenue Line stations both have two tracks and one island platform. The complex is connected to the nearby Chambers Street–World Trade Center/Park Place/Cortlandt Street station complex and the World Trade Center Transportation Hub through the Dey Street Passageway, which is outside of the station's fare control area. The station was the fifth busiest in the system in 2019 with 27,715,365 passengers.

== History ==
=== First subway ===
==== Construction and opening ====
Planning for a subway line in New York City dates to 1864. However, development of what would become the city's first subway line did not start until 1894, when the New York State Legislature passed the Rapid Transit Act. The subway plans were drawn up by a team of engineers led by William Barclay Parsons, the Rapid Transit Commission's chief engineer. The Rapid Transit Construction Company, organized by John B. McDonald and funded by August Belmont Jr., signed the initial Contract 1 with the Rapid Transit Commission in February 1900, in which it would construct the subway and maintain a 50-year operating lease from the opening of the line. In 1901, the firm of Heins & LaFarge was hired to design the underground stations. Belmont incorporated the Interborough Rapid Transit Company (IRT) in April 1902 to operate the subway.

Several days after Contract 1 was signed, the Board of Rapid Transit Railroad Commissioners instructed Parsons to evaluate the feasibility of extending the subway south to South Ferry, and then to Brooklyn. On January 24, 1901, the Board adopted a route that would extend the subway from City Hall to the Long Island Rail Road (LIRR)'s Flatbush Avenue terminal station (now known as Atlantic Terminal) in Brooklyn, via the Joralemon Street Tunnel under the East River. Contract 2, which gave the IRT a 35-year lease, was executed between the commission and the Rapid Transit Construction Company on September 11, 1902. Construction began at State Street in Manhattan on November 8, 1902. The section of the Contract 2 subway tunnel under the southernmost section of Broadway, between Battery Park and City Hall, was awarded to Degnon-McLean Contracting Company. By the beginning of January 1905, the station was nearly complete, but heavy snow delayed the installation of the entrances.

The IRT Lexington Avenue Line station opened on January 16, 1905, as part of a one-stop southward extension from Brooklyn Bridge, the previous southernmost express station on the original IRT line. Only the northbound platform (on the eastern side of the station) was in use initially. The station was to serve express trains, and thus the platforms were designed to accommodate eight cars. The platforms had entrances at Fulton and Dey Streets, with three token booths at each end, to alleviate overcrowding. The Rapid Transit Commission had not approved the station's opening; in considering whether to permit the station's operation, the commission found that advertising agents Ward & Gow had installed slot machines in the Fulton Street station just before it opened. The commission ordered the machines' removal on January 19, saying that the machines violated a ban on advertising in subway stations. The southbound platform opened on June 12, 1905, when the subway was extended one stop south to Wall Street. The station's completion resulted in increased real-estate values in the area. The slot machines were reinstalled in May 1906, following a legal dispute over whether the slot machines should be allowed.

==== Early modifications ====
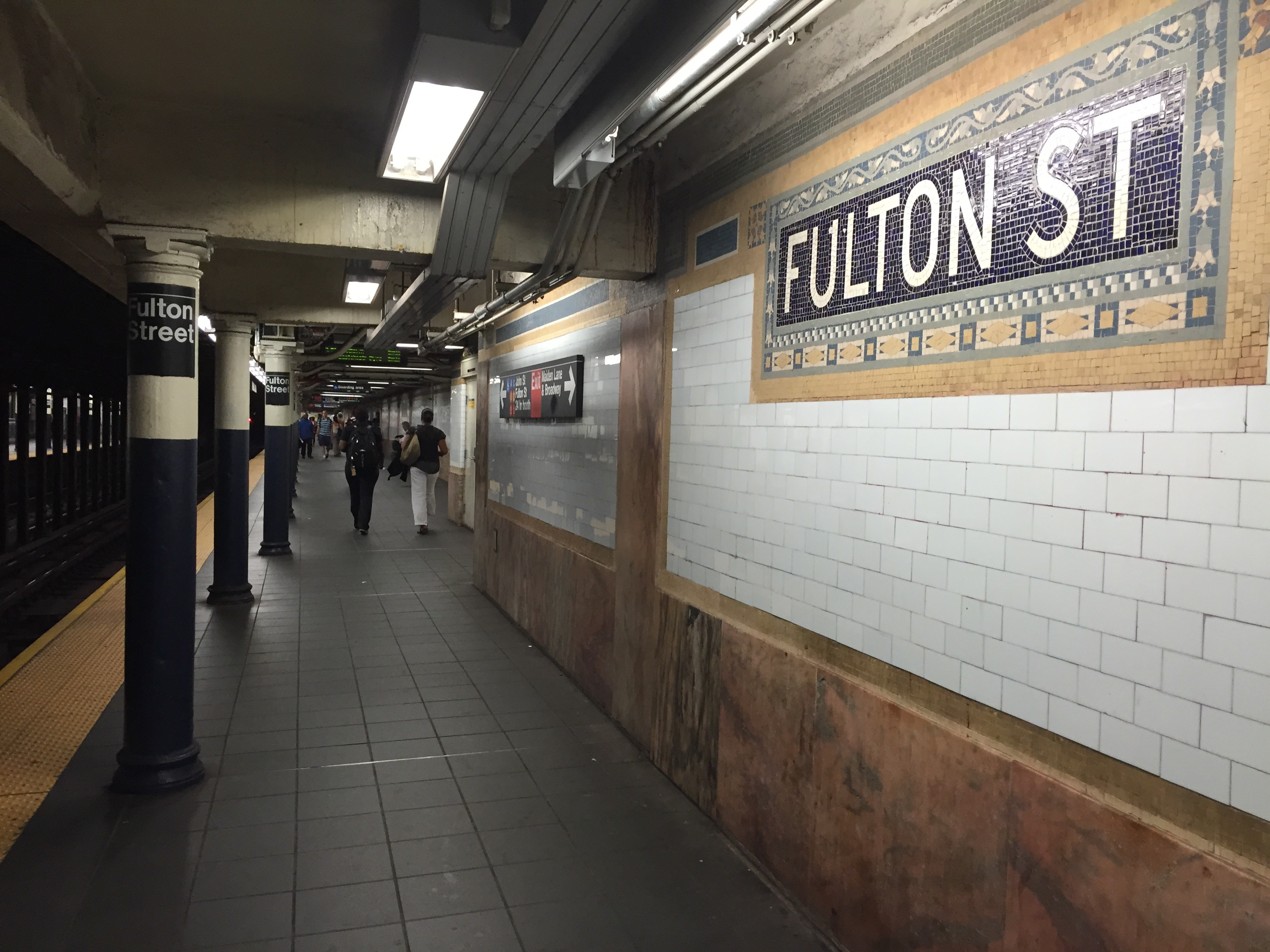
The Fulton Street station of the Lexington Avenue Line was the first station in the complex to be built.

To address overcrowding, in 1909, the New York Public Service Commission proposed lengthening the platforms at stations along the original IRT subway. As part of a modification to the IRT's construction contracts made on January 18, 1910, the company was to lengthen station platforms to accommodate ten-car express and six-car local trains. In addition to $1.5 million (equivalent to $51.8 million in 2025) spent on platform lengthening, $500,000 (equivalent to $17.3 million in 2025) was spent on building additional entrances and exits. It was anticipated that these improvements would increase capacity by 25 percent. The northbound platform at the Fulton Street station was extended 150 feet (46 m) to the south, while the southbound platform was extended 135 feet (41 m) to the south. The northbound platform extension required underpinning adjacent buildings, while the southbound platform extension was largely in the basements of adjacent properties and involved extensive reconstruction of these buildings. On January 23, 1911, ten-car express trains began running on the East Side Line, and the next day, ten-car express trains began running on the West Side Line. Staircases from the southbound platform to 195 Broadway, at the northwest corner of Broadway and Dey Street, opened in 1916.

=== Dual Contracts expansion ===
After the original IRT opened, the city began planning new lines. In April 1912, the New York Public Service Commission gave the Brooklyn Rapid Transit Company (BRT) the right to operate the proposed Clark Street Tunnel under the East River, between Old Slip in Lower Manhattan and Clark Street in Downtown Brooklyn. The next month, the Old Slip–Clark Street route was assigned to the IRT instead; the plans called for a station at Fulton Street. The BRT was allowed to extend its Centre Street Line south to a new Montague Street Tunnel. Both this extension and the IRT's Clark Street Tunnel were to have stations at Fulton Street in Lower Manhattan. These routes were finalized in the Dual Contracts between the government of New York City, the BRT, and the IRT, which were signed in 1913.

==== Broadway–Seventh Avenue Line ====
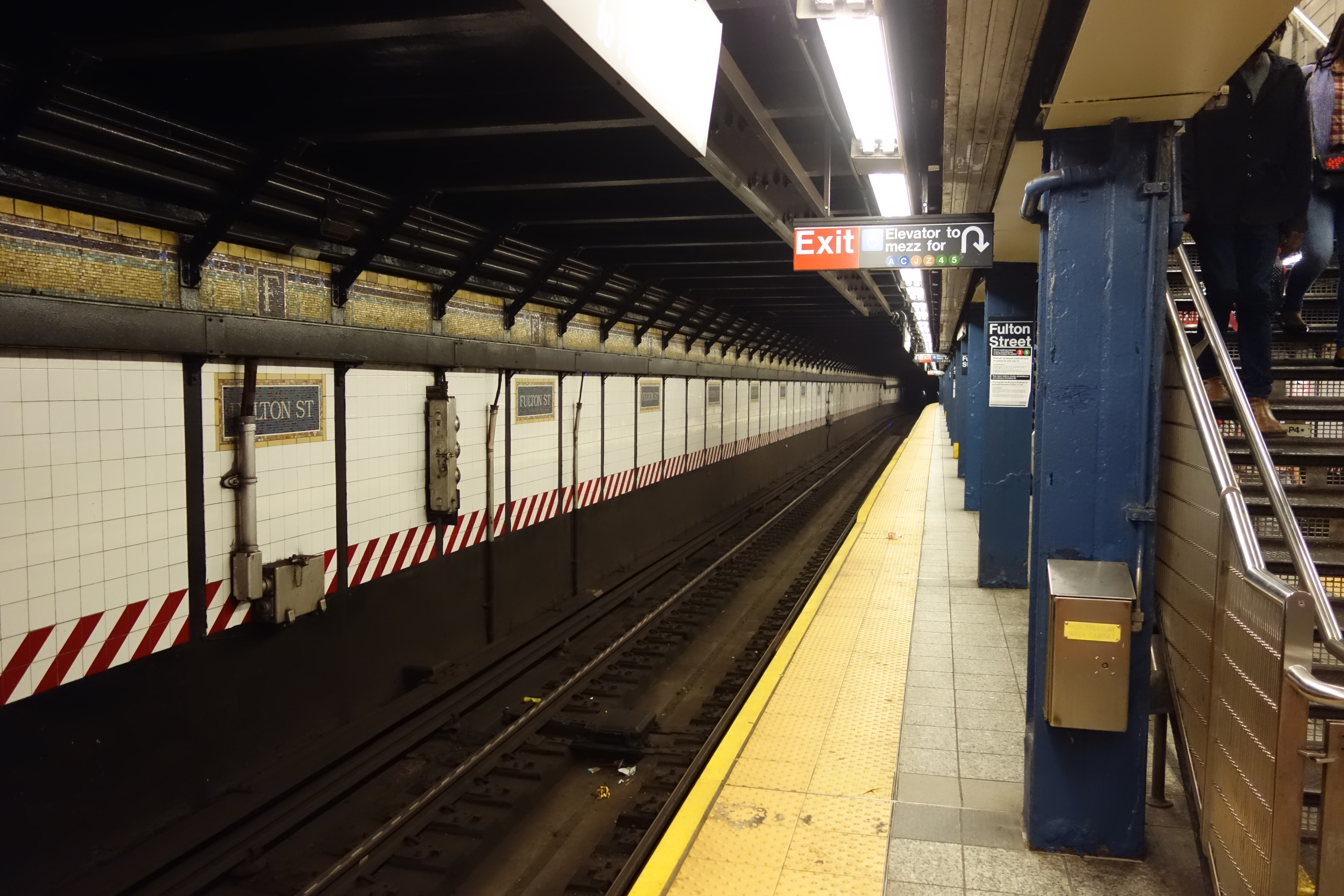
The Fulton Street station of the Broadway–Seventh Avenue Line was the second station in the complex to be built.

As part of the Dual Contracts, the New York City Public Service Commission planned to split the original IRT system into three segments: two north–south lines, carrying through trains over the Lexington Avenue and Broadway–Seventh Avenue Lines, and an east–west shuttle under 42nd Street. This would form a roughly H-shaped system. The Dual Contracts entailed building the IRT Broadway–Seventh Avenue Line south of Times Square–42nd Street. South of the Chambers Street station, the line was to split into two branches, one of which would travel under Park Place and William Street to the Clark Street Tunnel in Brooklyn. The Brooklyn branch was to have a station at William and Fulton Streets. Before the Dual Contracts were signed, many business owners on William Street had opposed the construction of a subway line there, claiming that the subway's construction could damage buildings because the street was only 40 feet (12 m) wide. The New York Supreme Court, Appellate Division, approved the William Street subway in February 1913. The William Street subway was to be a two-track line; the Public Service Commission originally planned to place one track above the other but, by July 1914, had decided to build both tracks on one level. The tunnel was to measure 29 feet (8.8 m) wide, except the stations on Fulton Street and Wall Street, which were to measure 40 feet (12 m) wide.

The Public Service Commission began soliciting bids for the William Street portion of the line in September 1914. Smith, Hauser, & McIsaac submitted a low bid of $2.254 million (equivalent to $72 million in 2025). The awarding of the contract was delayed by a dispute over whether gas mains should be carried on temporary overpasses above the tunnel's excavation site. Another dispute arose over the locations of subway entrances. The Fulton Street station was supposed to have entrances along the sidewalk on William Street, but local business and civic groups argued that the subway entrances, despite being only 6.5 feet (2.0 m) wide, would occupy much of the 9-foot-wide (2.7 m) sidewalk. By March 1916, two business owners on the street had agreed to add subway entrances in their buildings to the Fulton Street station. Prior to the start of construction, the city government agreed to pay for any damage caused by the project. The contractors underpinned every building along the tunnel because most of the buildings had shallow foundations that extended only to a shallow layer of quicksand, rather than to the bedrock below. Discussions of the station's exits continued through early 1918.

The line was nearly completed by late 1917, but the signals and station finishes were incomplete due to World War I–related material shortages. The Broadway–Seventh Avenue Line's Fulton Street station opened on July 1, 1918, and was initially served by a shuttle between Chambers Street and Wall Street on the line's Brooklyn branch. On August 1, 1918, the new "H" system was implemented, joining the two halves of the Broadway–Seventh Avenue Line and sending all West Side trains south from Times Square; through trains on the Brooklyn branch began operating to Upper Manhattan and the Bronx. The Lexington Avenue Line also opened north of Grand Central–42nd Street, and all services at the original station on Broadway were sent through that line.

==== Nassau Street Line ====
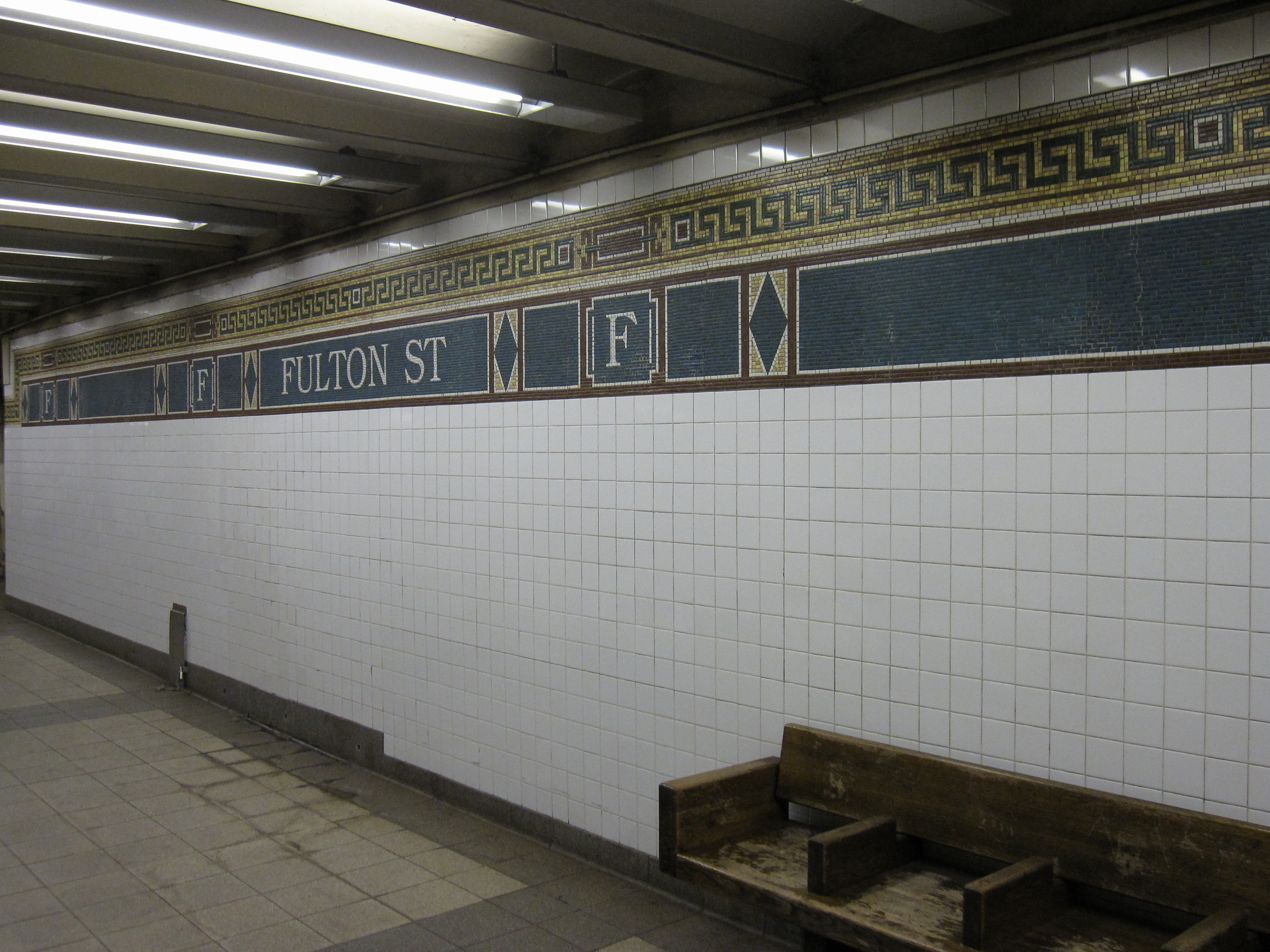
The Fulton Street station of the Nassau Street Line was the third station in the complex to be built.

Also as part of the Dual Contracts, the BRT (after 1923, the Brooklyn–Manhattan Transit Corporation or BMT) was assigned to construct and operate the Nassau Street Line. Most of the BMT's Dual Contracts lines were completed by 1924, except for the Nassau Street Line. BMT chairman Gerhard Dahl was persistent in requesting that the city build the line, saying in 1923 that the BMT was willing to operate the line as soon as the city completed it. At the time, the BMT was planning to construct two stations on the Nassau Street Line, including one at Fulton Street, where the BMT planned to place the northbound platform above the southbound platform due to the street's narrowness. However, mayor John Hylan refused to act during his final two years in office. New York City Board of Transportation (BOT) chairman John H. Delaney believed that the line was unnecessary because both of its planned stations would be extremely close to existing subway stations. Meanwhile, the BMT claimed that the city's failure to complete the line was overburdening other BMT lines. By January 1925, the BMT was asking its passengers to pressure Hylan into approving the remainder of the Nassau Street Line. Work did not commence until after James Walker succeeded Hylan as mayor at the end of 1925.

The city government agreed to build the Nassau Street Line in May 1927, after the BMT sued the city for $30 million (equivalent to $556 million in 2025). At the time, the city wanted to take over the BMT's lines but could not do so until all Dual Contracts lines were completed. The BOT received bids for the construction of the line that July, but it rejected every bid the next month because of concerns over the lowest bidder's ability to complete the work. That September, contractors again submitted bids to the BOT; some bidders offered to build the entire line, while others only offered to construct the segments of the line to the north or south of Liberty Street. The BOT awarded construction contracts for the line's construction two months later. The Marcus Contracting Company was hired to build the portion north of Liberty Street, including the Fulton Street station, for $4.7 million (equivalent to $87 million in 2025). Moranti and Raymond were hired to build the portion to the south for $5.7 million (equivalent to $106 million in 2025). The New York City Board of Estimate approved the contracts in January 1928, allowing the builders to construct the line using the cut-and-cover method, despite merchants' requests that the line be constructed using tunneling shields.

When the construction contracts were awarded, work had been projected to be completed in 39 months. The line was constructed 20 feet (6.1 m) below the active IRT Lexington Avenue Line, next to buildings along the narrow Nassau Street, and the project encountered difficulties such as quicksand. Nassau Street is only 34 feet (10 m) wide, and the subway floor was only 20 feet (6.1 m) below building foundations. As a result, 89 buildings had to be underpinned to ensure that they would stay on their foundations. Construction was done at night so as to not disturb workers in the Financial District. By early 1929, sixty percent of the work had been finished. The project was 80 percent complete by April 1930, and Charles Meads & Co. was awarded a $252,000 contract to install the Fulton Street station's finishes the next month. The plans had been changed so that the southbound platform was above the northbound platform. Later that year, a federal judge ruled that the city government did not have to pay the BMT $30 million in damages for failing to construct the Nassau Street Line. The total construction cost was $10.072 million (equivalent to $238 million in 2025) for 0.9 miles (1.4 km) of new tunnels, or $2,068 per foot ($6,780/m), which was three times the normal cost of construction at the time.

The Nassau Street Loop opened on May 29, 1931. The loop ran from the line's previous terminus at Chambers Street, running through the Fulton Street and Broad Street stations before merging with the Montague Street Tunnel to Brooklyn. The completion of the line relieved congestion on several BMT lines to southern Brooklyn, which previously had to operate to Midtown Manhattan using the Broadway Line. The BMT's Fulton Street station was originally served by trains from the Jamaica Line and the Culver Line.

=== IND expansion ===
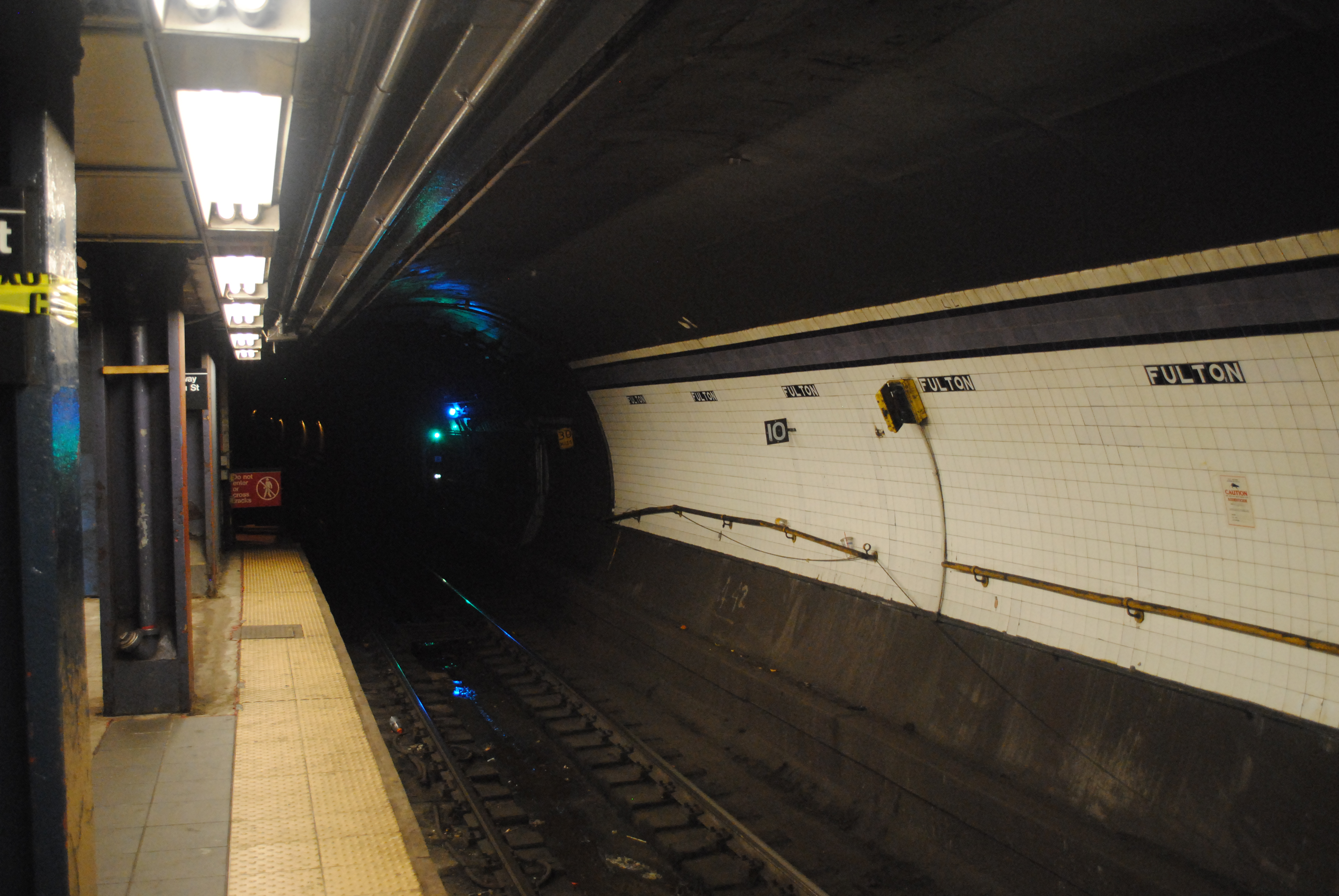
The Fulton Street station of the Eighth Avenue Line was the last station in the complex to be built.

Mayor Hylan's original plans for the Independent Subway System (IND), proposed in 1922, included building over 100 miles (160 km) of new lines and taking over nearly 100 miles (160 km) of existing lines, which would compete with the IRT and BMT. On December 9, 1924, the BOT gave preliminary approval for the construction of the IND Eighth Avenue Line. This line consisted of a corridor connecting Inwood, Manhattan, to Downtown Brooklyn, running largely under Eighth Avenue but also paralleling Greenwich Avenue and Sixth Avenue in Lower Manhattan. The BOT announced a list of stations on the new line in February 1928, with a station under Fulton Street at Broadway in Manhattan. Work on the line had commenced in 1925, and the main section of the Eighth Avenue Line, from Chambers Street north to 207th Street, was opened to the public on September 10, 1932.

The Broadway/Nassau Street station was part of a three-stop extension of the IND Eighth Avenue Line from Chambers Street in Lower Manhattan to Jay Street–Borough Hall in Downtown Brooklyn. The station, under Fulton Street between Broadway and William Street, would be the southernmost IND station in Manhattan. The two-track extension was to connect the quadruple-tracked main portion of the Eighth Avenue Line with the proposed Culver and Fulton Street lines in Brooklyn. The Mason-Hangar Company received a $22.28 million contract for the construction of this segment in May 1927 (equivalent to $413 million in 2025), and construction of the extension began in June 1928. The IND's Brooklyn extension was 82 percent completed by December 1930. Although most work on the line had been finished by December 1932, city controller Charles W. Berry then requested $1.57 million for the line's completion (equivalent to $37 million in 2025).

The Cranberry Street Tunnel, extending the express tracks east under Fulton Street to Jay Street, was opened for the morning rush hour on February 1, 1933, with a stop at Broadway/Nassau Street. The Broadway/Nassau station was initially served by express trains during the daytime on weekdays and Saturdays; local trains only served the station when express trains were not operating. It had ten entrances from the street, as well as direct connections to the IRT and BMT stations at Fulton Street. The opening of the Broadway/Nassau station eliminated an "outstanding drawback" to Upper Manhattan residents' usage of the Eighth Avenue Line, as the IND previously did not have a direct connection to Manhattan's Financial District. On the other hand, the station's convoluted layout confused some riders when it opened.

=== 20th-century improvements ===
==== 1940s to 1960s ====
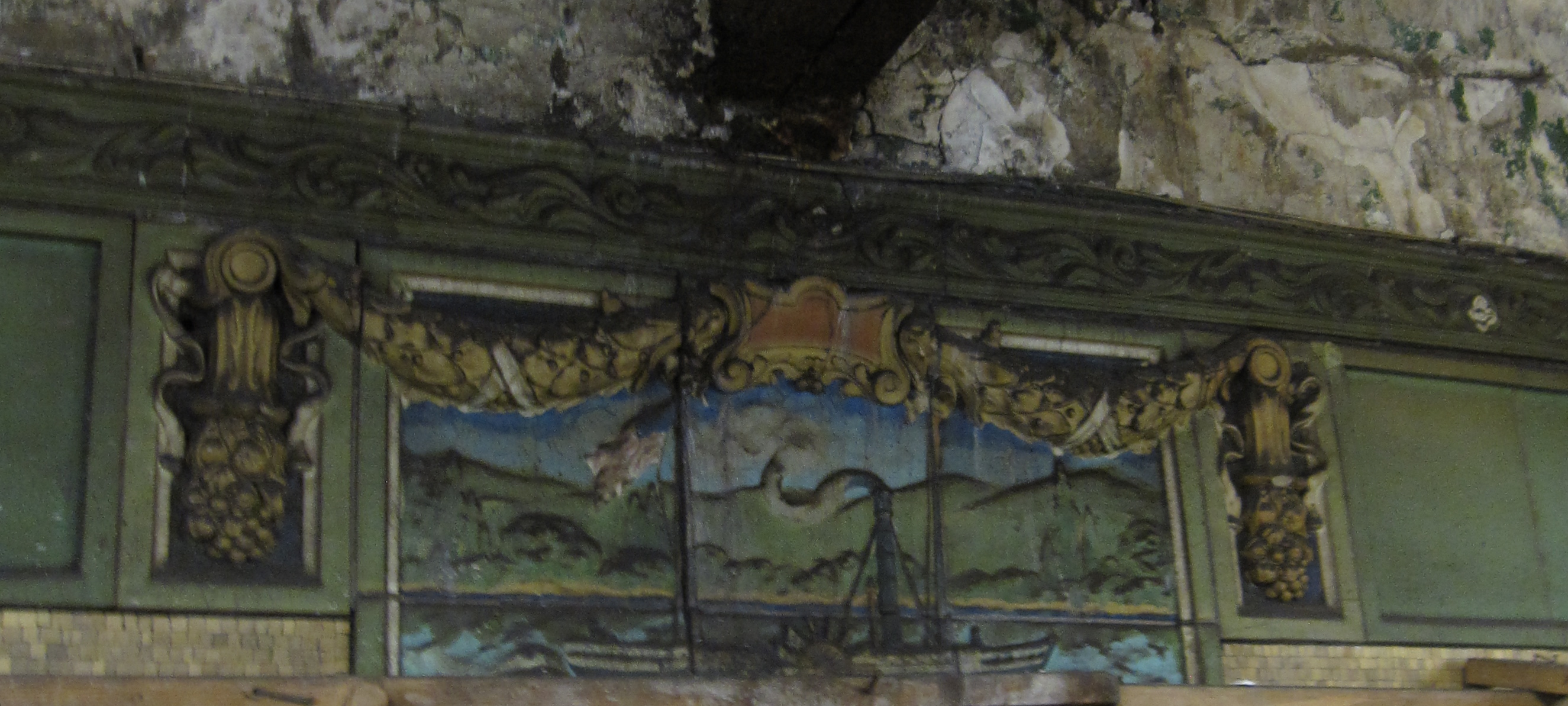
Detail of the tilework in the Lexington Avenue Line station

The city government took over the BMT's operations on June 1, 1940, and the IRT's operations on June 12, 1940. Transfer passageways between the four stations were placed inside fare control on July 1, 1948. The rearrangement of turnstiles allowed free transfers in the existing passageways between the Eighth Avenue, Nassau Street, and Broadway–Seventh Avenue platforms. Passengers transferring to and from the Lexington Avenue Line had to receive a paper transfer. On August 25, 1950, the railings of the Lexington Avenue and Eighth Avenue Line stations were rearranged to allow direct transfers, and the paper transfers were discontinued.

The New York City Transit Authority (NYCTA), the BOT's successor, announced plans in 1956 to add fluorescent lights to the Fulton Street station. The NYCTA also asked the city government in 1958 to provide $66,700 for a moving walkway connecting the IND and IRT platforms at Fulton Street. The moving walkway, measuring 105 feet (32 m) long, would have been the first in the New York City Subway system. The NYCTA publicly announced plans for the moving walkway in August 1960; the agency's chairman Charles L. Patterson claimed that the moving walkway would ease congestion in the passageways between each platforms.

In late 1959, contracts were awarded to extend the platforms at Fulton Street on the Lexington Avenue Line, as well as nine others on the same line, (Note: Bowling Green, Wall Street, Canal Street, Spring Street, Bleecker Street, Astor Place, Grand Central–42nd Street, 86th Street, and 125th Street) to 525 feet (160 m) to accommodate ten-car trains. Work on the platform extension at Fulton Street began in April 1960 and was still underway two years later. The platform-lengthening project was substantially completed by November 1965. During the 1964–1965 fiscal year, the platforms at Fulton Street on the Broadway–Seventh Avenue Line, along with those at four other stations on the line, were lengthened to 525 feet (160 m) to accommodate a ten-car train of 51-foot IRT cars.

==== 1970s to 1990s ====
A passageway from the Lexington Avenue Line station to the World Trade Center was completed in 1977. Late the next year, the MTA announced that it would modernize the Broadway–Nassau/Fulton Street station. The improvements included new finishes on the walls and floors; acoustical, signage, and lighting improvements; replacement of old mechanical equipment; and new handrails. In 1979, the New York City Landmarks Preservation Commission designated the space within the boundaries of the original IRT Lexington Avenue Line station, excluding expansions made after 1904, as a city landmark. The station was designated along with eleven others on the original IRT. By that time, the Lexington Avenue Line station was one of the 69 most deteriorated stations in the subway system. The Urban Mass Transportation Administration gave a $66 million grant to the New York City Transit Authority. Part of the grant was to be used for the renovation of several subway stations, including Fulton Street's IRT platforms, in 1982. The MTA attempted to replicate the original design of the Lexington Avenue Line platforms, even obtaining marble wainscoting from a Georgia quarry. The renovation, designed by Lee Harris Pomeroy, was finished in 1987. In addition, to speed up passenger flow, dozens of platform conductors were assigned to direct crowds on the Lexington Avenue Line platforms during the late 1980s.

During the early 1990s, the MTA removed some advertisements from the Lexington Avenue Line platforms to reduce what an MTA spokesman described as "the perception of chaos". The MTA also removed three of the station's high entry-exit turnstiles to increase passenger flow. The New York State Legislature agreed to give the MTA $9.6 billion for capital improvements in April 1993. Some of the funds would be used to renovate nearly one hundred New York City Subway stations, including the BMT platforms at Fulton Street and the IND platform at Broadway–Nassau Street. In 1994, amid a funding shortfall, the administration of mayor Rudy Giuliani proposed delaying the IND station's renovation. That October, the MTA announced it had indefinitely postponed plans for renovating the IND's Broadway–Nassau Street station. Ultimately, the BMT and IND platforms were both renovated during the 1990s. Additionally, in January 1994, Automated Fare Collection turnstiles went into service at the Broadway–Nassau/Fulton Street station, making it one of the first stations in the system to receive these turnstiles.

In late 1996, as part of a pilot program to reduce overcrowding, the MTA placed orange decals on the Lexington Avenue Line platforms with the words "Step Aside" and employed platform attendants during rush hours. Additionally, to reduce dwell times, the MTA started enforcing a policy that required conductors to close their doors after 45 seconds. This trial was shortly expanded to other stations. These policies reduced dwell times by about six seconds per train, allowing the MTA to operate an extra train during rush hours.

=== 21st-century renovation ===
==== Fulton Center plans and IRT renovation ====
After several pieces of transit infrastructure in Lower Manhattan were destroyed or severely damaged during the September 11, 2001, attacks, officials proposed a $7 billion redesign of transit in the neighborhood. Plans for a massive transit hub in Lower Manhattan, which was to incorporate the Fulton Street station, were first announced in January 2002. At the time, a Straphangers Campaign survey had ranked the station as one of the worst in the system; the complex was extremely hard to navigate because its four stations were built by different companies at different times. By April 2003, the MTA had released preliminary plans for a $750 million transit hub at Fulton Street, connecting six subway stations and constructing a new head house and the Dey Street Passageway. That December, the Federal Transit Administration allocated $750 million to the Fulton Street Transit Center (later the Fulton Center). The project was to include a domed station building at Fulton Street and Broadway. The transit center was to be financed using money from the September 11 recovery fund.

By May 2006, the budget for Fulton Center had grown, and the project had been delayed. Further delays and costs were incurred in February 2007. The MTA downsized the original plans for the transit center due to cost overruns, and the agency partially funded the project using 2009 federal stimulus money. Despite delays with the Fulton Center project, the MTA began renovating the IRT platforms. The rehabilitation of the Seventh Avenue Line platform started in 2005 and was completed by November 2006. The Lexington Avenue Line station at the western end of the complex began refurbishment in 2008. Historical features, such as the tiling, were preserved.

==== Fulton Center approval ====
East mezzanine

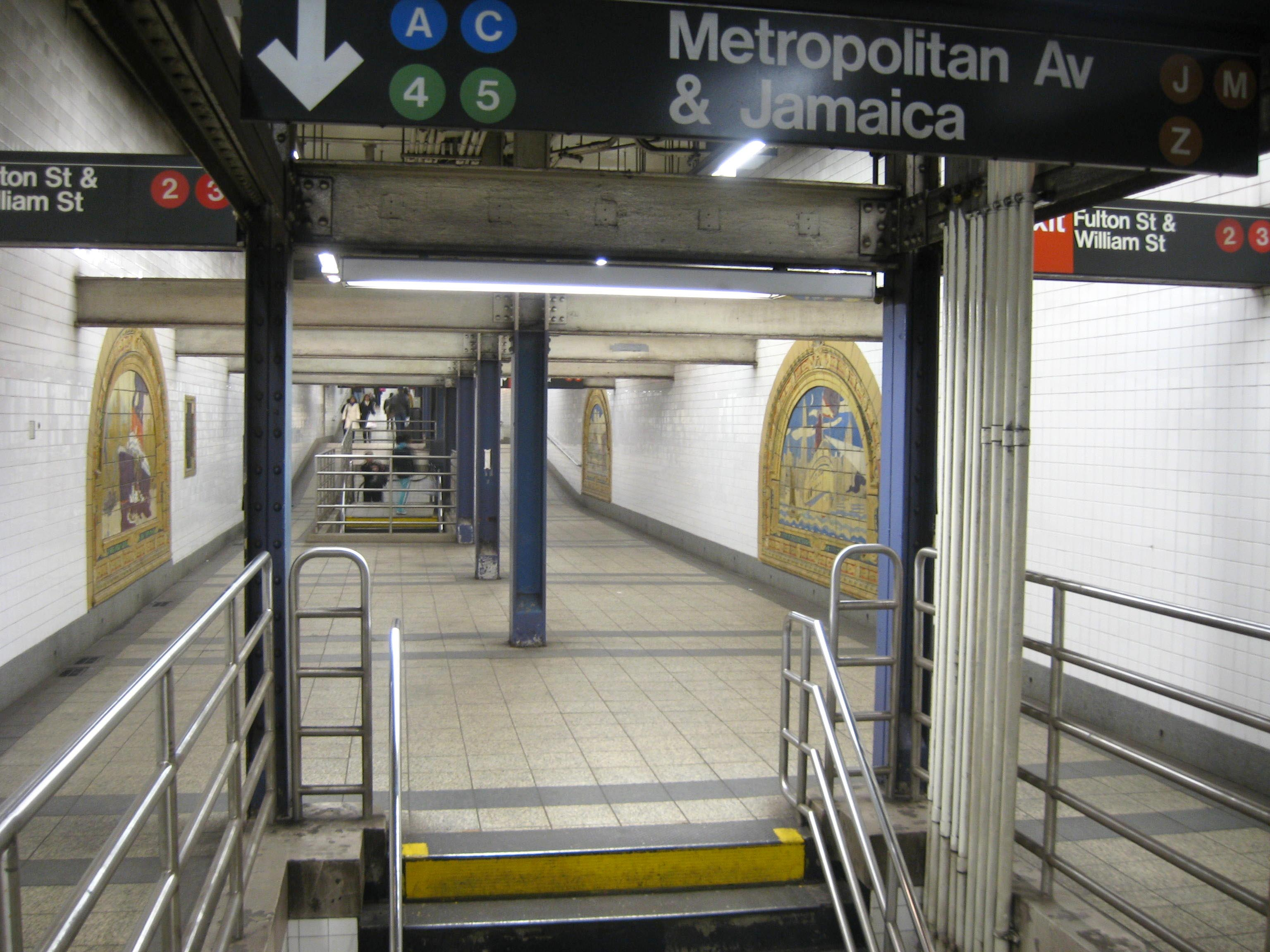
Before reconstruction

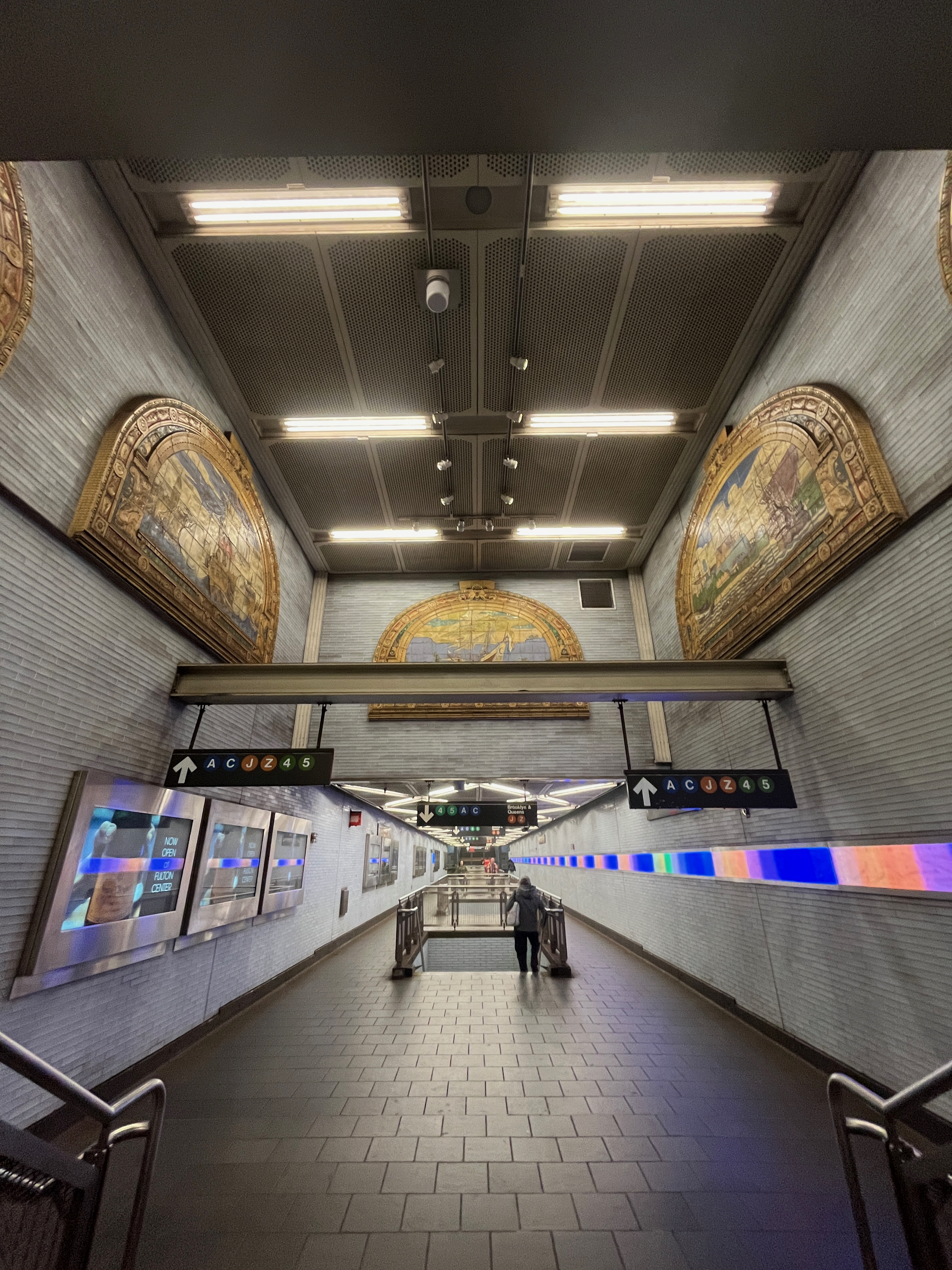
After reconstruction

In January 2009, the MTA received $497 million in additional stimulus money, bringing the total cost of the Fulton Street Transit Center to $1.4 billion. By then, a reporter for The New York Times wrote that the station's ramps, passageways, and stairs were so confusing that "The Fulton Street subway station might be a good spot for M. C. Escher to set up an easel, if the surrealist artist were still alive and sketching." This intricate system of ramps was replaced by two new mezzanines. Work on the IND mezzanine commenced in January 2010; the reconstruction of the transfer mezzanine over the Fulton Street IND platform resulted in traffic flow changes. The Eighth Avenue Line station adopted the "Fulton Street" name in December 2010 to become unified with the other platforms in the station complex. The eastern mezzanine and parts of the western mezzanine had opened by 2011, and the western mezzanine was completed by 2012.

New entrances were also opened as part of the project. In October 2012, a new entrance on Dey Street opened for the Dey Street underpass to Cortlandt Street, and an ADA-accessible elevator was installed for the southbound Lexington Avenue Line platform. The Fulton Building, at the southeast corner of Broadway and Fulton Street, was also built as part of the project; work on that building lasted for another two years. The Fulton Center project was completed with the opening of the Fulton Building in November 2014, and the entire complex was made ADA-accessible. In 2024, following several violent incidents in the subway system, the city government installed scanners in the Fulton Street station as part of a pilot program to detect weapons.

== Station layout ==
Metrically accurate station map showing platforms, mezzanines, stairs, elevators, escalators, exits, ticket machines, gates, benches, and trashcans.

The station consists of three levels; all of the platforms, except for the IND Eighth Avenue Line platform, are oriented roughly on a north–south axis. Most transfers are made through the IND platform, which runs east–west three stories below ground level, beneath the other three stations. The stacked-staggered configuration of the BMT Nassau Street Line platforms splits the IND mezzanine levels into halves. The eastern half stretches from Nassau Street to William Street, from the southbound Nassau Street Line platform to the Broadway–Seventh Avenue Line platform. Similarly, the western half of the mezzanine stretches from Nassau Street to Broadway, from the northbound Nassau Street Line to the Lexington Avenue Line platforms. Transferring passengers have to use the third-basement-level IND platform to navigate between both halves of the mezzanine, since the Nassau Street Line's platforms bisect the mezzanine on both the first and second basement levels.

Originally, a network of passageways and ramps loosely connected the various lines with each other, causing congestion during peak hours. The transfer mezzanine, also known as the IND mezzanine, was built as part of the Fulton Center project in the 2010s. This mezzanine replaced these ramps and made several adjacent entrances redundant.

Fulton St to Cortlandt St subway cross-section
Greenwich St	WTC Transportation; Hub (Oculus) / Westfield Shops	Church St		Broadway	Fulton; Center / Westfield; Shops		Nassau St		William St
1	WTC Transportation; Hub (Oculus) / Westfield Shops	R / W		4 / 5	Fulton; Center / Westfield; Shops		J / Z south		mezzanine
underpass	WTC Transportation; Hub (Oculus) / Westfield Shops	underpass	Dey Street Passageway	underpass	Fulton; Center / Westfield; Shops	mezzanine	J / Z north	mezzanine	2 / 3
mezzanine	WTC Transportation; Hub (Oculus) / Westfield Shops				← A / C →
PATH

=== Artwork ===
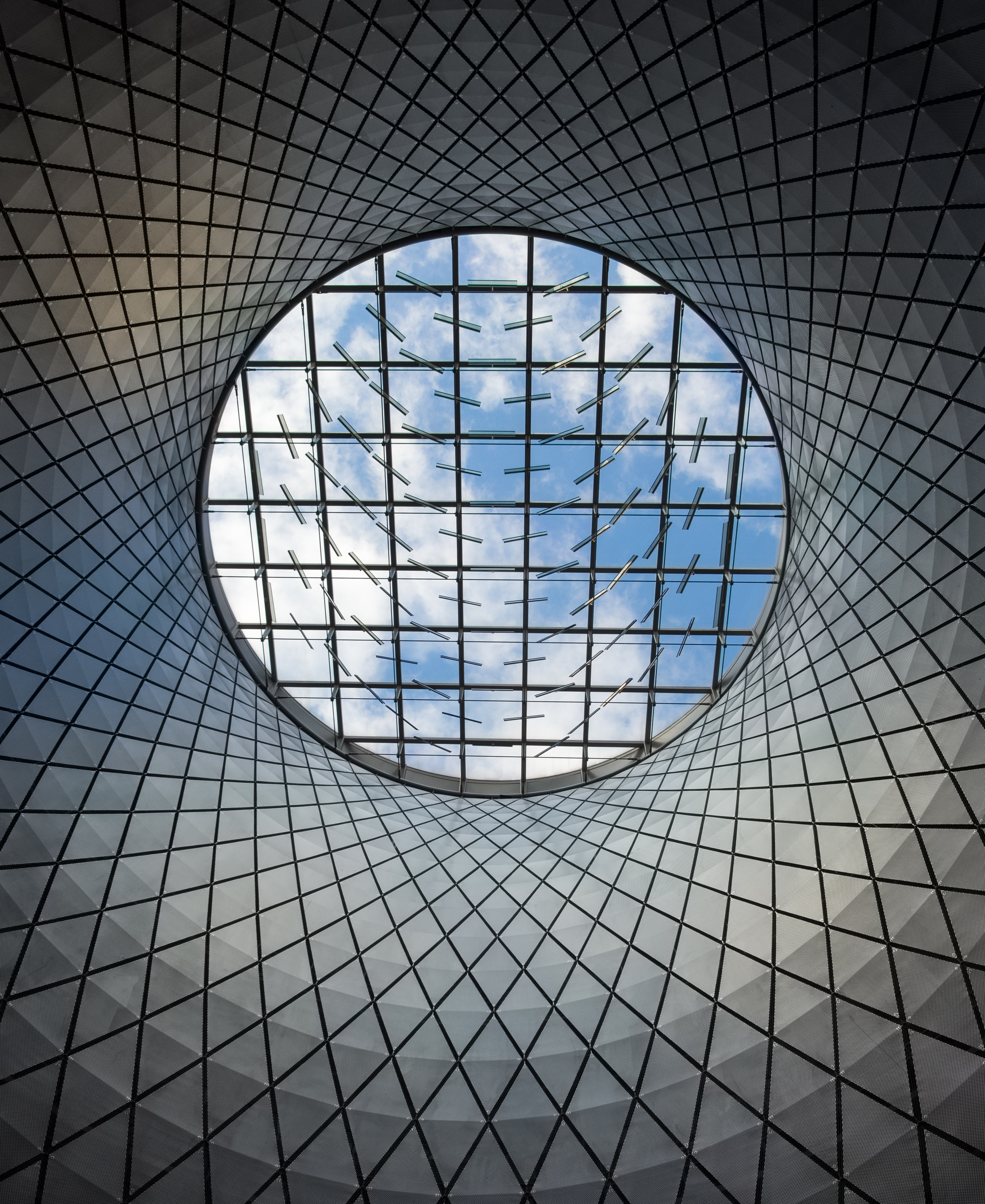
The Sky Reflector-Net, as seen from the center of the Fulton Building

There are various artworks at the Fulton Street station. The Sky Reflector-Net, atop the Fulton Center building at the southeast corner of Fulton Street and Broadway, was installed in 2014 and commissioned as part of the MTA Arts & Design program. The Sky Reflector-Net uses hundreds of aluminum mirrors to provide natural sunlight from a 53 ft (16 m) skylight to an underground area as much as four stories deep. The complex also features digital signage with art, which is displayed as part of the MTA's Digital Art program.

The connection from the Broadway–Seventh Avenue Line platform to the Eighth Avenue Line platform contains the artwork Marine Grill Murals, salvaged from the Marine Grill restaurant in the Hotel McAlpin at Herald Square. The six murals in the station are part of a set of glazed terracotta mosaics created by Fred Dana Marsh in 1912 for the Marine Grill and were discarded in 1990 when the Marine Grill was demolished. The murals were subsequently salvaged from a dumpster. Each mural measures 8 feet 2 inches (2.49 m) tall by 11 feet 7 inches (3.53 m) wide and is shaped like a lunette. Of the 16 original murals, 12 depicted two sets of six related scenes, while the other four depicted separate motifs. The New York Landmarks Conservancy preserved six of the murals, which were reinstalled at the Fulton Street station in 2001 for $200,000.

Prior to the Fulton Center project, the mezzanine above the IND platform showcased an artwork by Nancy Holt, Astral Grating, which was installed in 1987 in conjunction with Lee Harris Pomeroy Architects. The artwork consisted of light fixtures on the ceiling, made of welded steel. The light fixtures signified five constellations, namely Aries, Auriga, Canis Major, Cygnus, and Piscis Austrinus. The work was uninstalled and placed in storage when Fulton Center was built. Astral Grating was the first artwork created by a female artist to be installed in the subway system through the MTA Arts & Design program.

=== Exits ===
Due to the highly fragmented nature of the Fulton Street station, most of its entrances are only signed as serving certain routes, even though all exits technically provide access to all routes. Prior to the completion of Fulton Center, many of the station's entrances had been constructed piecemeal within various buildings, and these entrances were not easily visible from the street. The entire station complex is ADA-accessible via a series of elevators between the platforms and mezzanines. The Fulton Street station is close to several attractions such as St. Paul's Chapel and the World Trade Center.

On Broadway, five entrances are signed as serving the Eighth Avenue Line and southbound Lexington Avenue Line platforms (the A, C, 4, and 5 trains). At Broadway and Fulton Street, two stairs go up to the northwestern corner and one goes to 195 Broadway near the southwestern corner. One stair each goes up to the northwestern corner of Broadway's intersections with Dey and Cortlandt Streets. Additionally, one entrance, a stair at the northeast corner of Maiden Lane and Broadway at the southern end of the Lexington Avenue Line station, is signed as serving the Eighth Avenue Line and northbound Lexington Avenue Line platforms. The entrances on Broadway originally had cast-iron hoods with leaf patterns; similar hoods still exist at the Wall Street/Broadway and Borough Hall stations. The original entrances at the northwest and northeast corners of Fulton Street and Broadway were replaced in 1933 when the IND station opened. Prior to the completion of Fulton Center, there was no access from ground level to the southern ends of the Lexington Avenue Line platforms.

Four Broadway entrances are signed as providing access to several routes in the complex. There is a stair and elevator at the southwest corner of Dey Street and Broadway; they are signed as providing access to all services except the northbound Lexington Avenue Line platform, and are also signed as an entrance as the separate Cortlandt Street station on the R and W trains. The two stations are connected outside of fare control via the Dey Street Passageway, which measures 300 feet (91 m) long by 29 feet (8.8 m) wide and opened in May 2016. Two entrances are signed as serving all routes in the complex, as well as the R and W trains at Cortlandt Street: the Fulton Center building at the southeast corner of Fulton Street and Broadway, as well as an entrance through the Corbin Building on John Street east of Broadway. The Fulton Center building has stairs, escalators, and elevators, while the Corbin Building contains escalators.

Seven entrances are signed as serving the Eighth Avenue Line and Broadway–Seventh Avenue Line platforms (the A, C, 2, and 3 trains). At Fulton and William Streets are five entrances: two stairs to the northeastern corner, one to the southeastern corner, and one stair and one elevator to the southwestern corner. There are also two part-time entrances inside the office building at 110 William Street; one is on William Street and the other is on John Street. When the Broadway–Seventh Avenue Line station was built in 1918, it had been designed to allow a subway entrance to be built inside any building on William Street between Ann Street to the north and John Street to the south. As such, there was formerly an entrance in a building on the east side of William Street south of Ann Street. Another exit, at the northeast corner of William and Fulton Streets, was removed before 1930.

Six entrances are signed as serving the Eighth Avenue Line platform and either of the Nassau Street Line platforms (the A, C, J, and Z trains). Four stairs, one each on either eastern corner of Nassau and Fulton Streets and on either eastern corner of John and Nassau Streets, serve the Eighth Avenue Line and northbound Nassau Street Line platforms. The John and Nassau Streets entrances are open only during rush hours. Two stairs, one on either western corner of Nassau and Fulton Streets, serve the Eighth Avenue Line and northbound Nassau Street Line platforms. There were originally also two stairs from the northbound Nassau Street Line platform to the southwest corner of John and Nassau Streets and one stair to the northwest corner of the same intersection. From the north end of the Nassau Street Line station was an exit to Ann Street, as well as a passageway that led north to stairs on the northeast and southeast corners of Nassau and Beekman Streets. The exit to Ann Street connected the southbound platform with a structure known as the Hilton Building, where there were two stairs. The John Street and Beekman Street exits closed around 1988, while the Ann Street exit had closed by 1992.

Entrances to the Fulton Street station

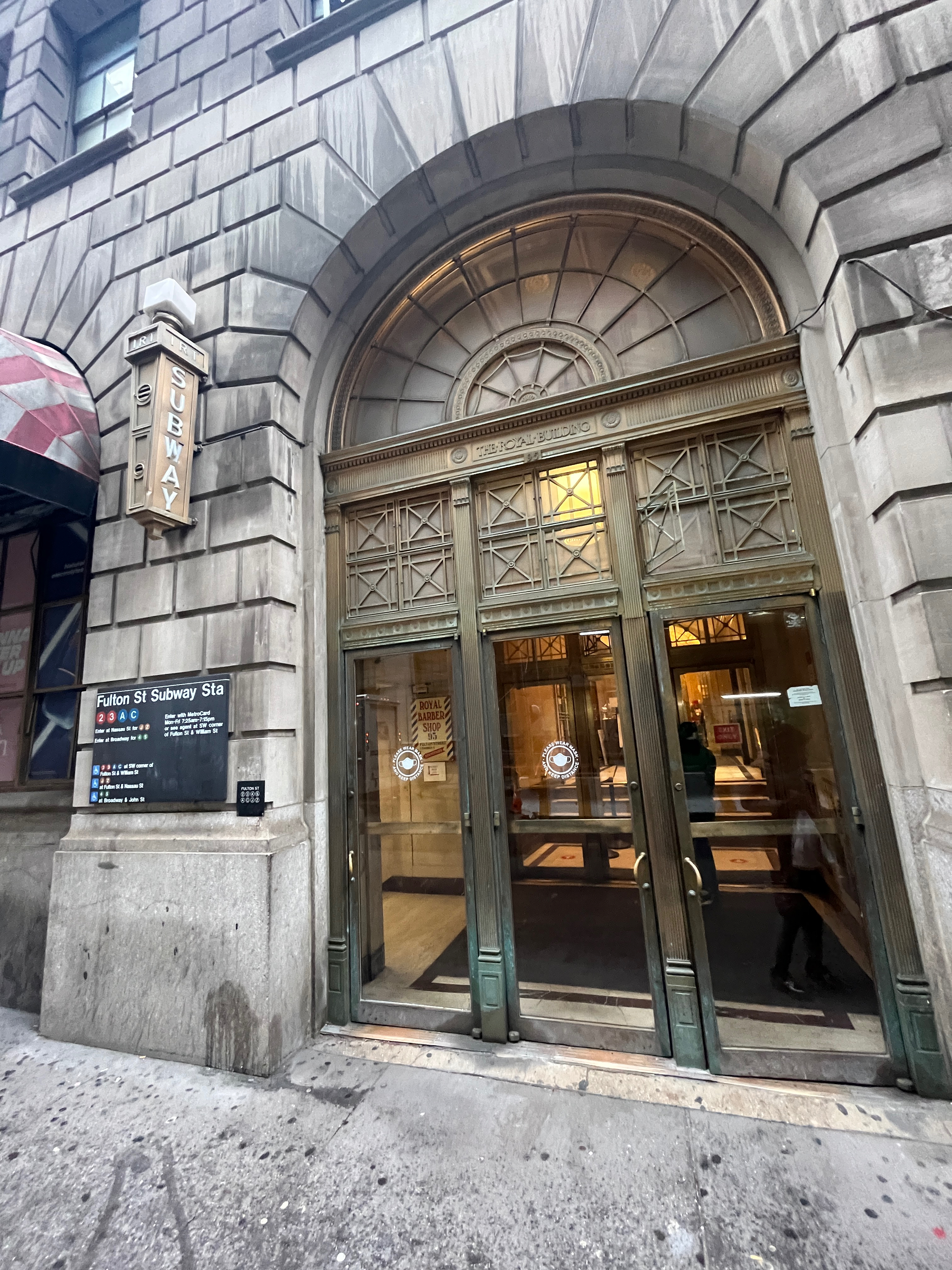
Entrance within Royal Building

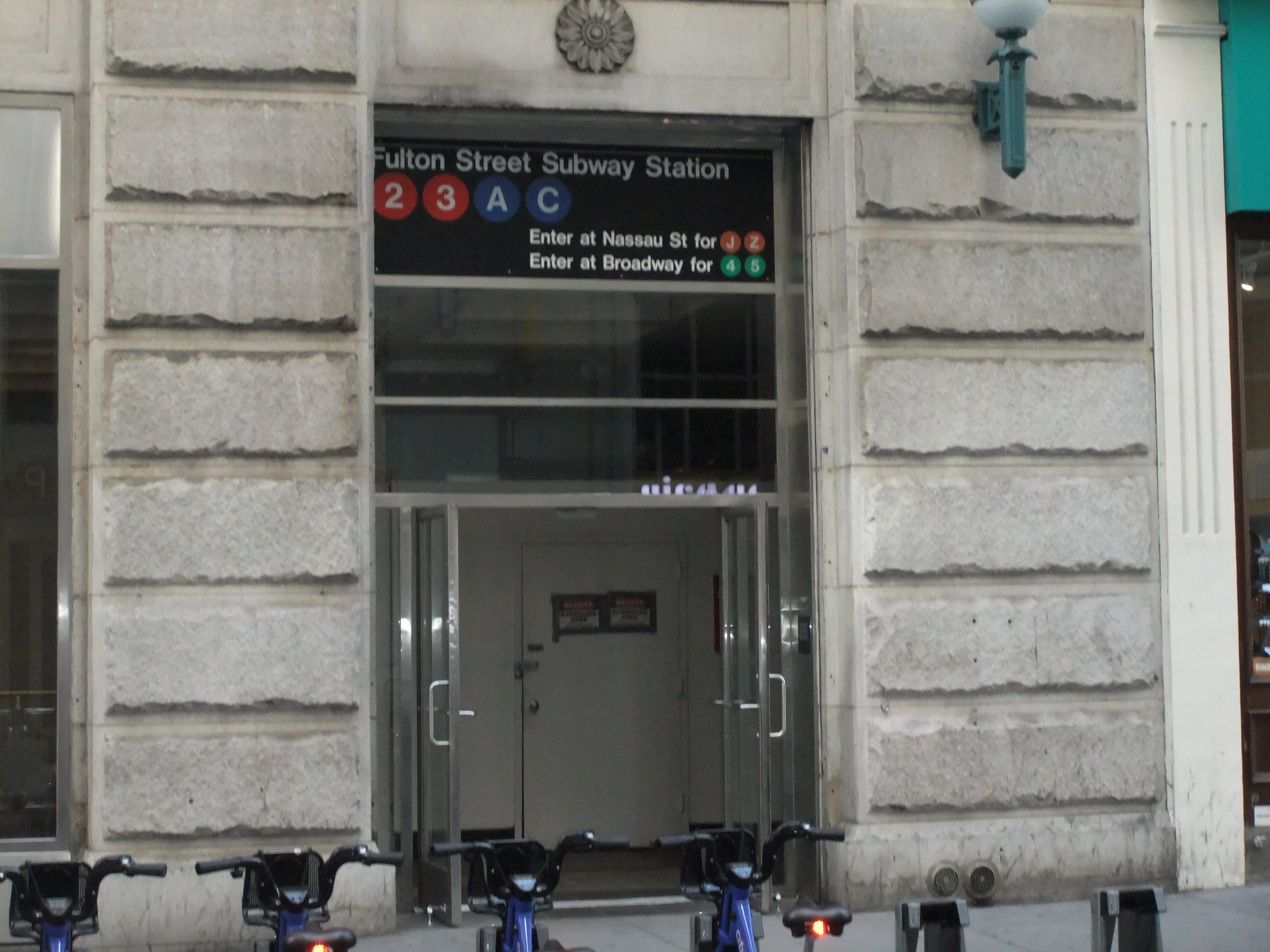
Entrance at William Street and Fulton Street

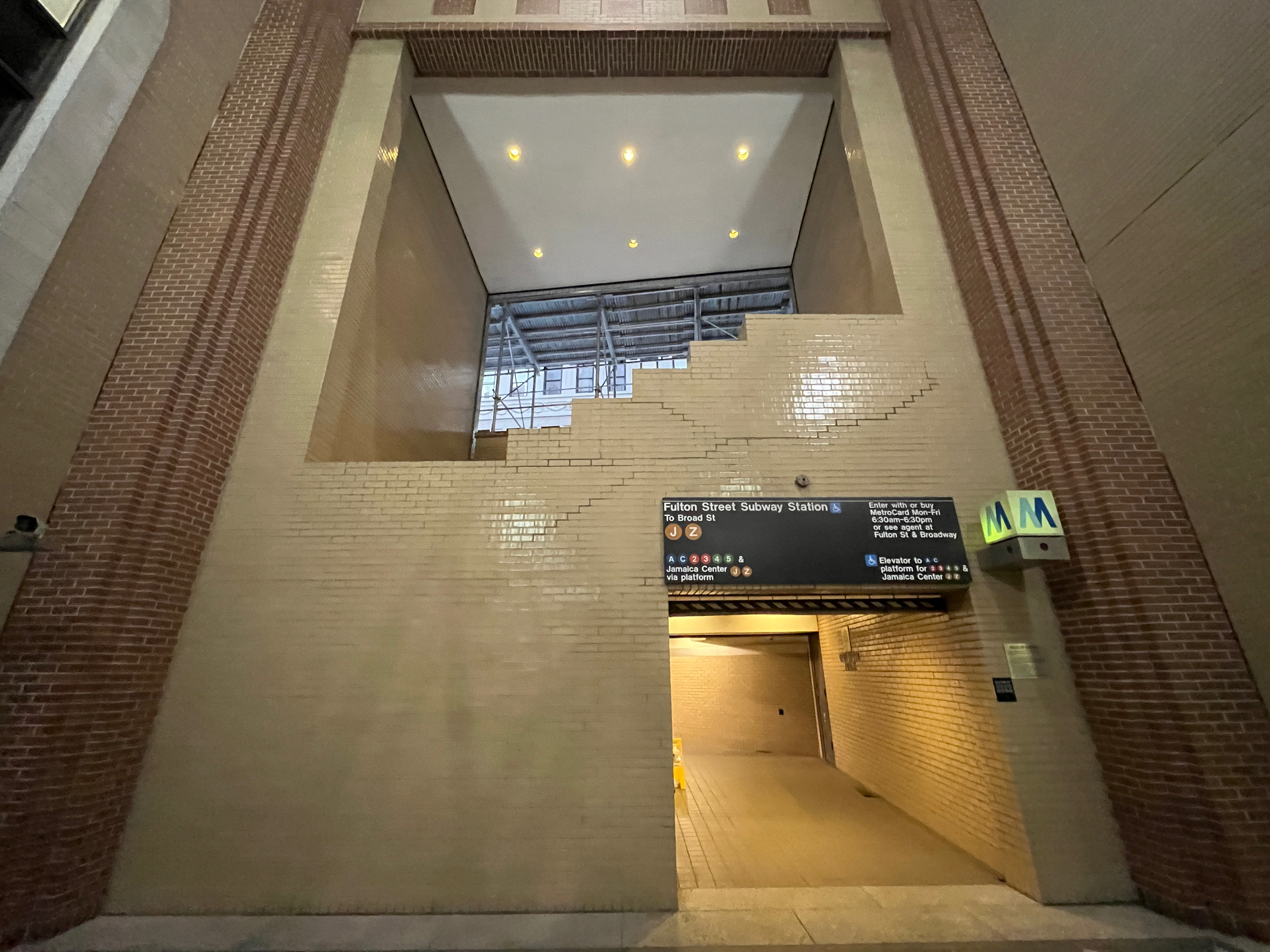
33 Maiden Lane

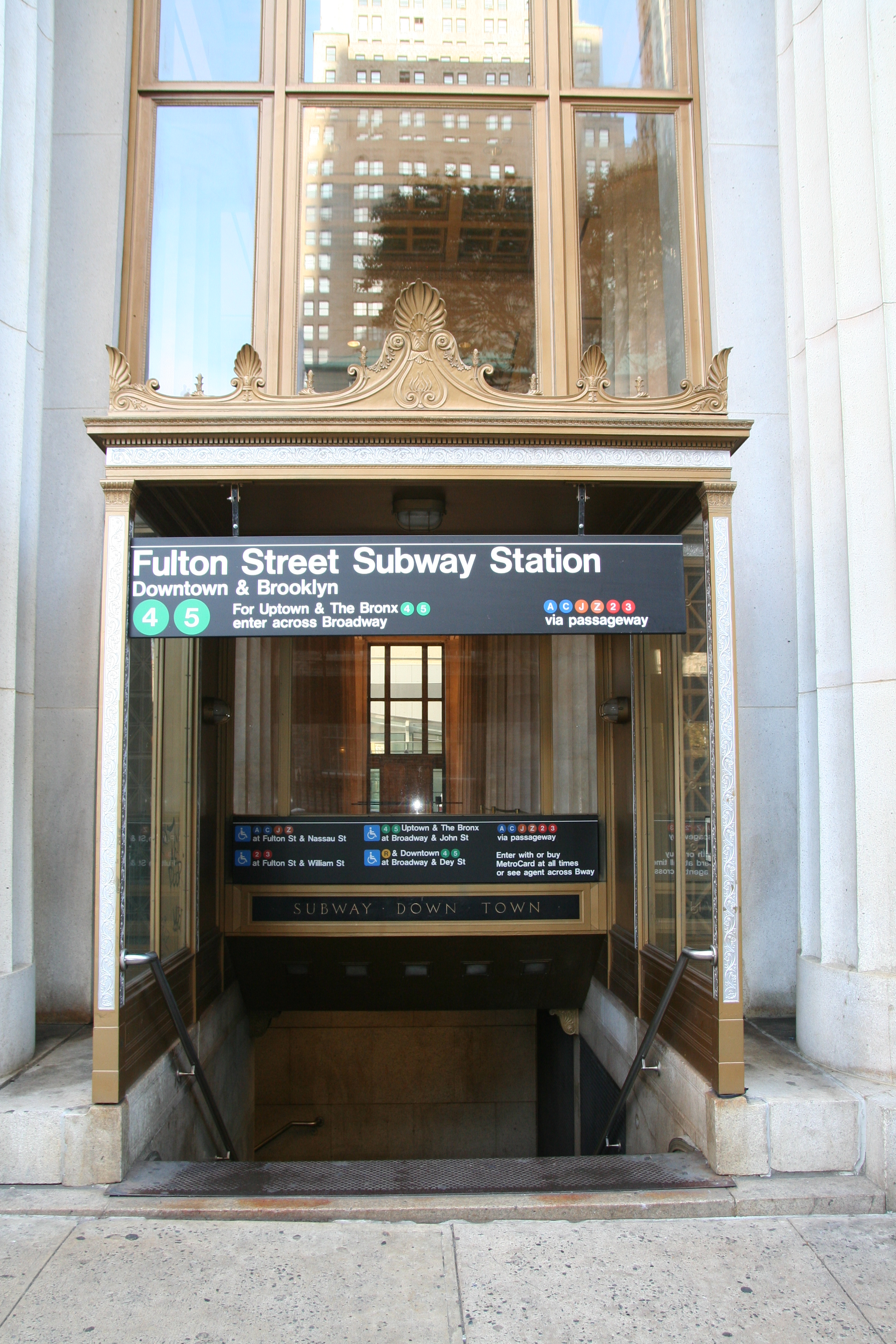
195 Broadway

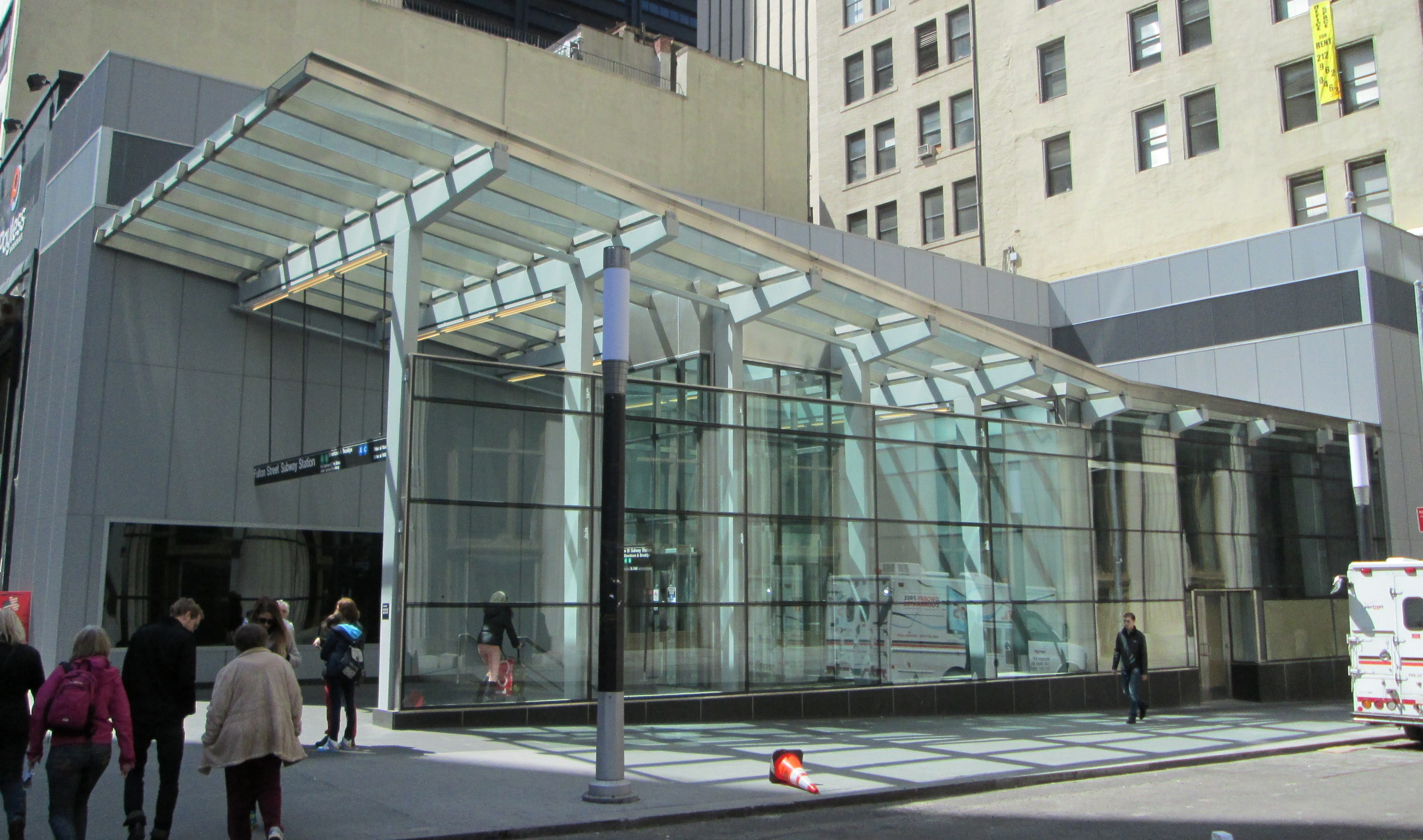
Dey Street stair

== IRT Broadway–Seventh Avenue Line platform ==
Fulton Street
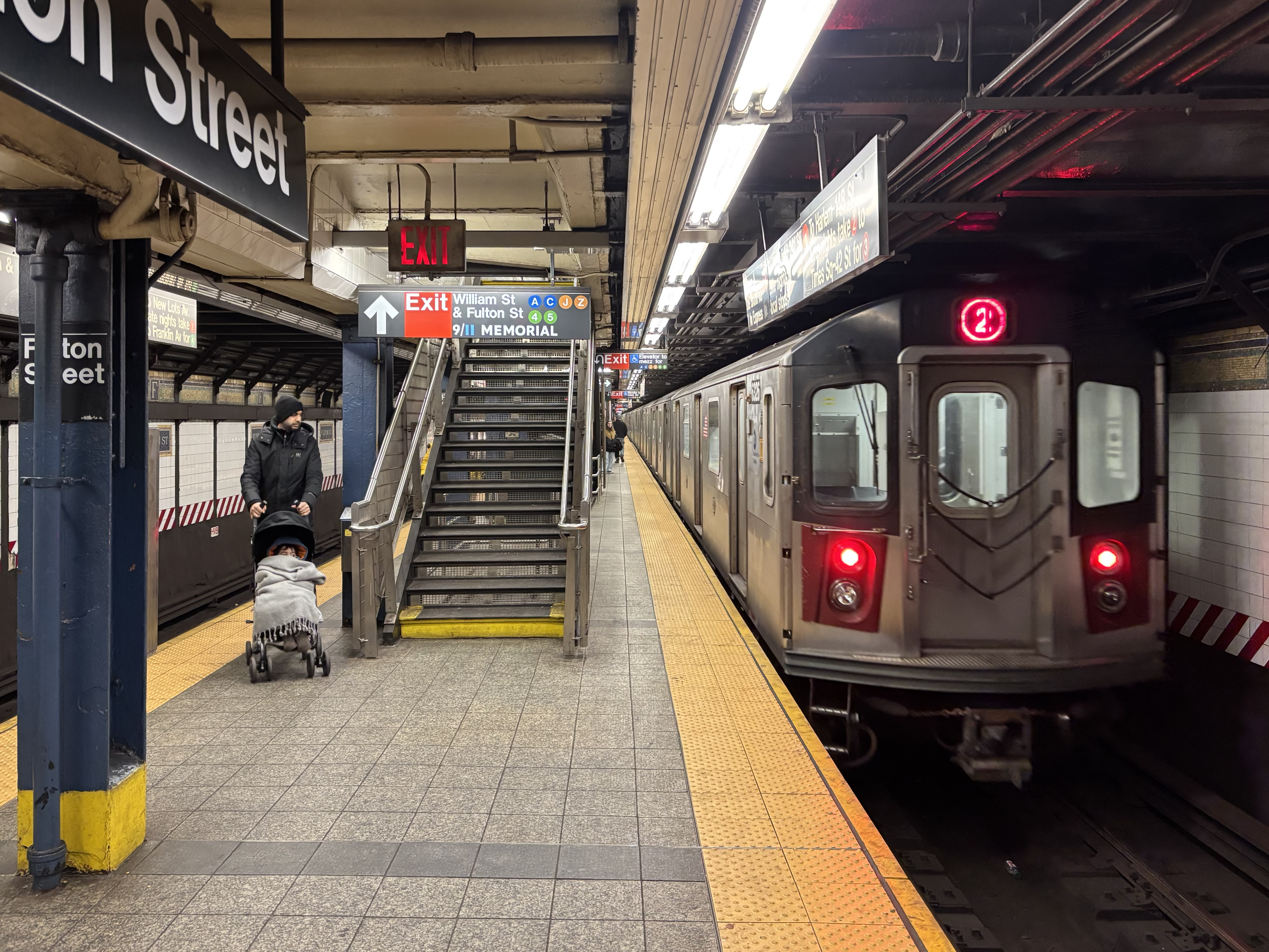
- Northbound R142 2 train departing

Station statistics
- Division: A (IRT)
- Line: IRT Broadway–Seventh Avenue Line
- Services: 2 (all times); 3 (all except late nights)
- Platforms: 1 island platform
- Tracks: 2

Other information
- Opened: July 1, 1918; 108 years ago
- Accessible: Yes
Services
Preceding station	New York City Subway	Following station
Park Place 2 3 via 135th Street	2 (New York City Subway service) 3 (New York City Subway service)	Wall Street 2 3 via Franklin Avenue–Medgar Evers College
Track layout
Station service legend
Symbol	Description
Stops all times except late nights	Stops all times except late nights
Stops all times	Stops all times
Stops weekdays during the day	Stops weekdays during the day
Stops weekdays and weekday late nights	Stops weekdays and weekday late nights

The Fulton Street station on the IRT Broadway–Seventh Avenue Line has two tracks and one island platform. It is situated underneath William Street between John Street to the south and Ann Street to the north. The 2 train stops here at all times, while the 3 train stops here at all times except late nights. The station is between Park Place to the north and Wall Street to the south.

The platform is 525 feet (160 m) long. It has a relatively narrow width of 13.5 feet (4.1 m), causing congestion during rush hours. Fixed platform barriers, which are intended to prevent commuters falling to the tracks, are positioned near the platform edges. The station has two mezzanines, separated at Fulton Street. The north mezzanine is open at all times, while the south mezzanine is open part-time. Prior to the construction of Fulton Center, the mezzanine had low ceilings and several bends, which caused congestion. Brooklyn-bound trains use track K2, while uptown trains use track K3; these designations come from track chaining and are not used by the public.

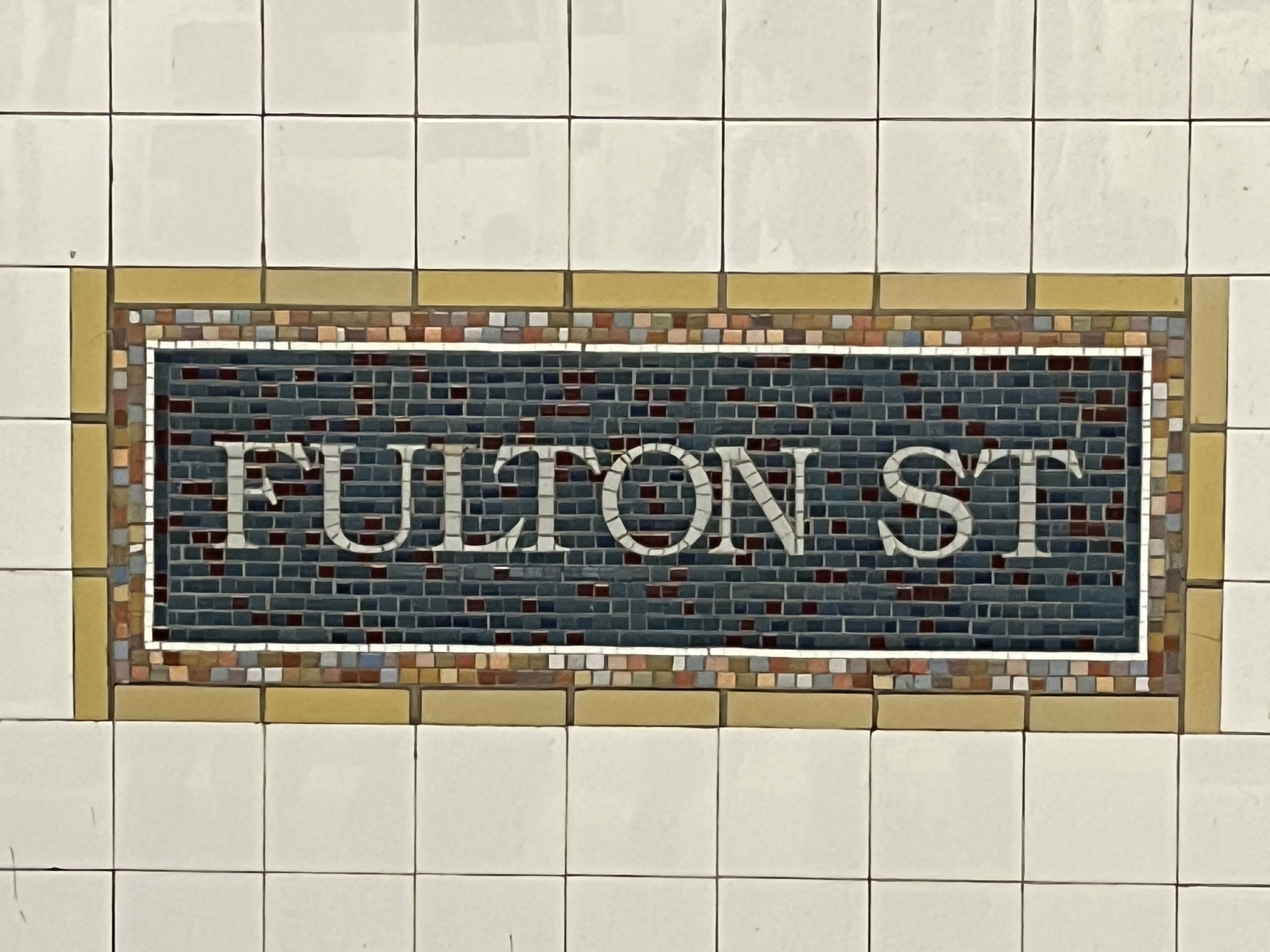
Mosaic name tablet

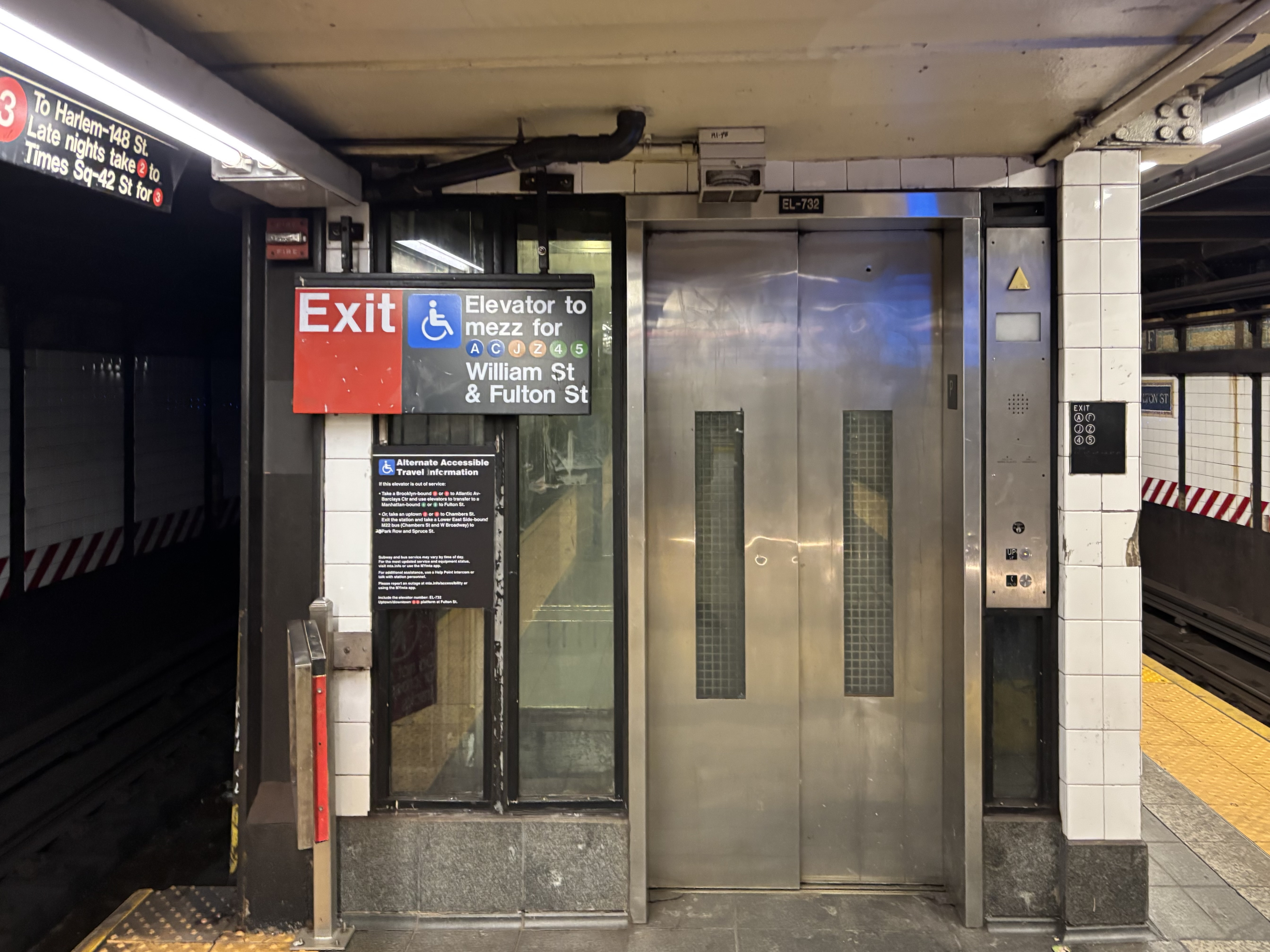
Elevator from the platform

== BMT Nassau Street Line platforms ==
Fulton Street
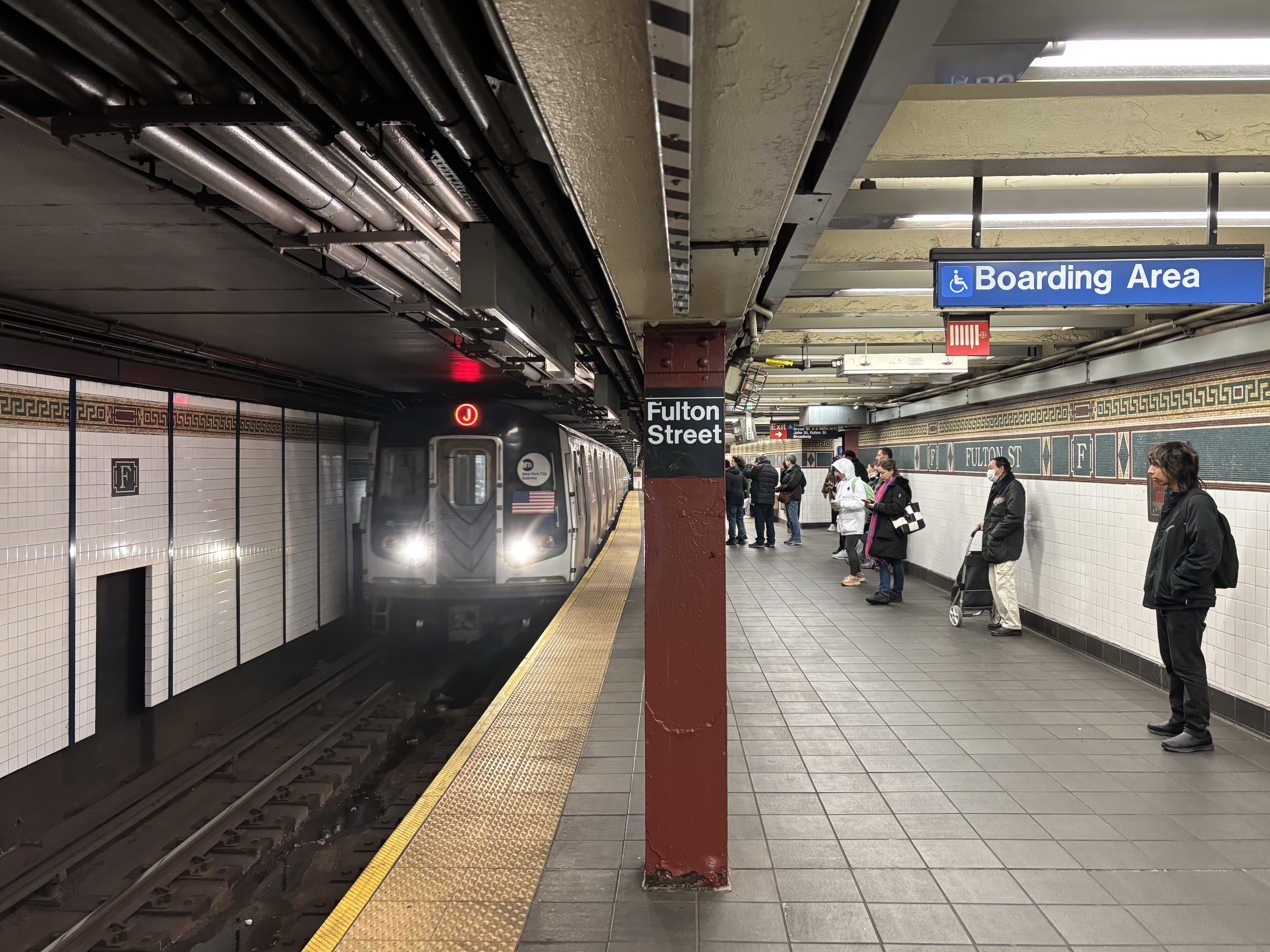
- R143 J train arriving at the northbound platform

Station statistics
- Division: B (BMT)
- Line: BMT Nassau Street Line
- Services: J (all times); Z (rush hours, peak direction)
- Levels: 2
- Platforms: 2 side platforms (1 on each level)
- Tracks: 2 (1 on each level)

Other information
- Opened: May 29, 1931; 95 years ago
- Accessible: Yes
Services
Preceding station	New York City Subway	Following station
Chambers Street J Z toward Jamaica Center–York College	J/Z (New York City Subway service)	Broad Street J Z Terminus
Track layout
Station service legend
Symbol	Description
Stops all times	Stops all times
Stops rush hours in the peak direction only	Stops rush hours in the peak direction only

The Fulton Street station on the BMT Nassau Street Line has two tracks and two side platforms in a split platform configuration, with downtown trains on the upper level and uptown trains on the lower level. It is situated underneath Nassau Street between John Street to the south and Ann Street to the north. The J train stops here at all times, while the Z train stops here during rush hours in the peak direction. The station is between Chambers Street to the north and Broad Street to the south.

The platforms measure 535 feet (163 m) long. The northbound platform is about 14.5 feet (4.4 m) wide, while the southbound platform ranges from 14 to 17.7 feet (4.3 to 5.4 m) wide. Fixed platform barriers, which are intended to prevent commuters falling to the tracks, are positioned near the platform edges. The station is constructed on two levels because of the extreme narrowness of Nassau Street, which forced contractors to avoid buildings' foundations while they constructed the station, as well as a curve at Fulton Street. Nassau Street is only 40 feet (12 m) wide at this point, so both levels' western and eastern walls are right next to the foundations of adjacent buildings. Since the platforms on both levels are to the left of the tracks, the most direct entrances are on the left side of each platform. Northbound trains are more directly accessed via entrances on the west side of Nassau Street, and southbound trains are more directly accessed via entrances on the east side of Nassau Street. The IND platform passes underneath both levels of this station; the two platforms are connected to each other and to the other stations in the complex via the IND platform.

The walls of the Nassau Street Line station were originally decorated with orange tile bands, similar to those used at IND stations. By the 1990s, the walls had been redecorated with Greek key bands, as well as mosaics with the letter "F" and the station's name.

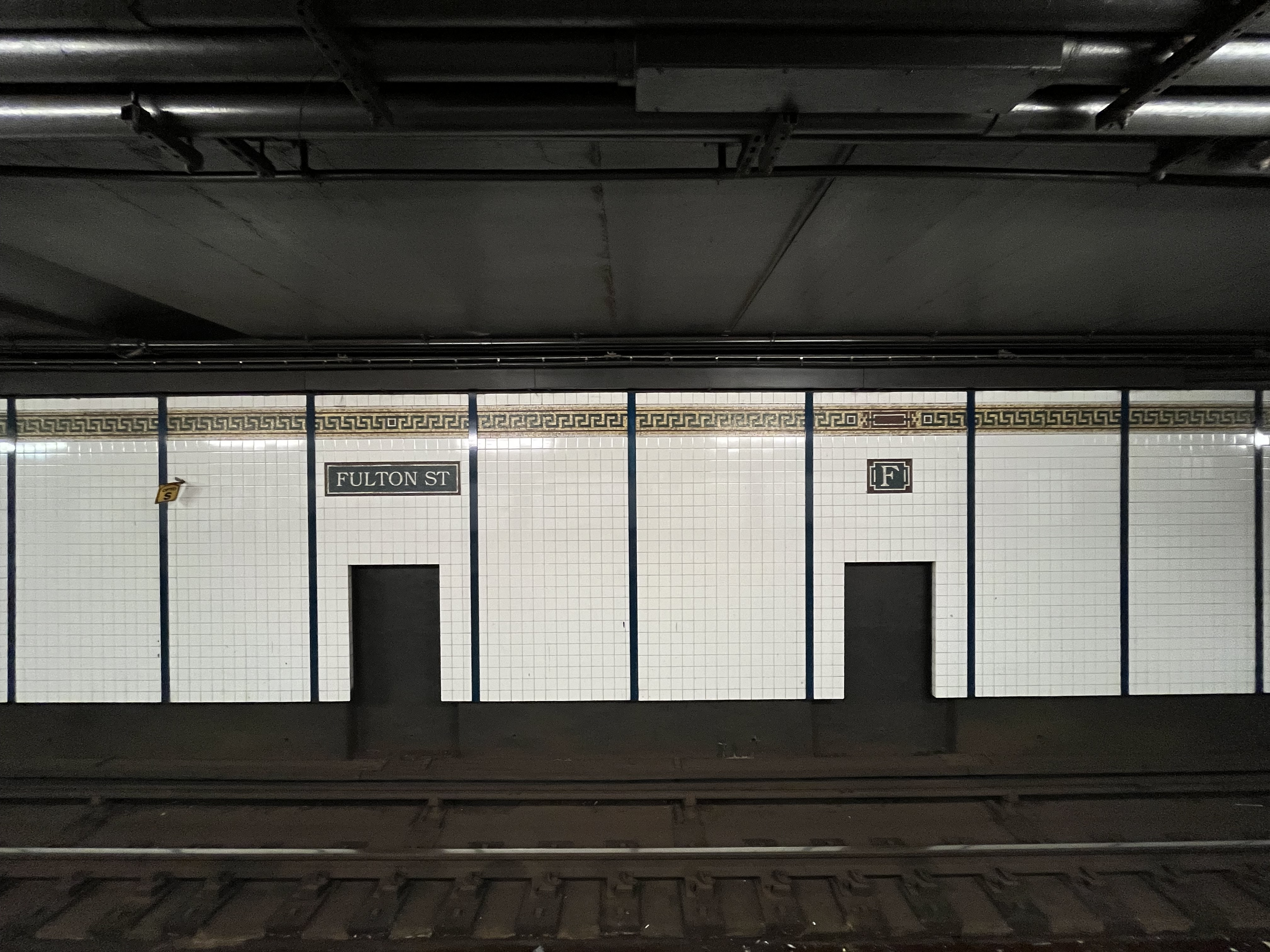
Full-name and "F" mosaics below trim line

== IRT Lexington Avenue Line platforms ==
Fulton Street
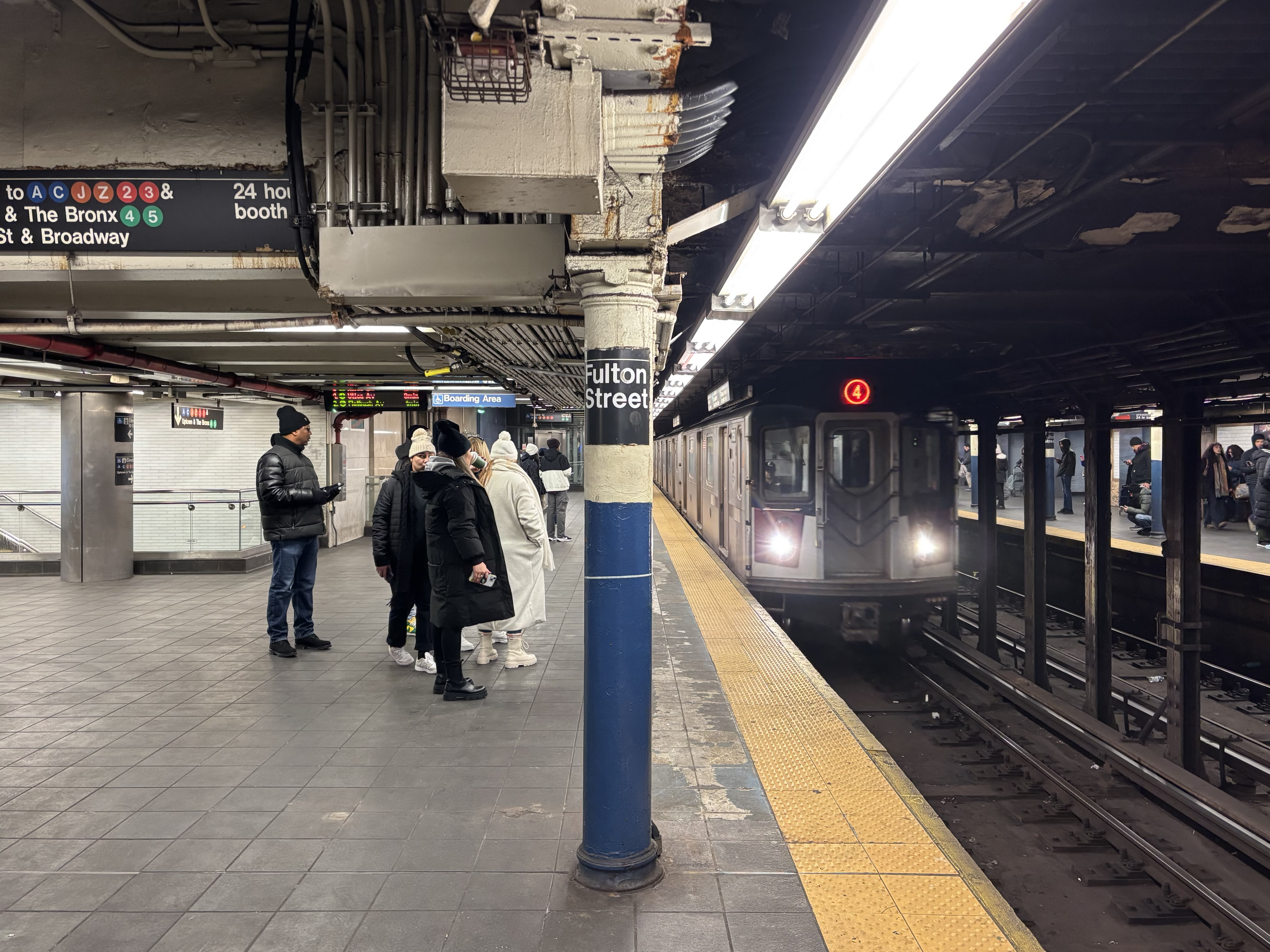
- R142A 4 train arriving at the southbound platform

Station statistics
- Division: A (IRT)
- Line: IRT Lexington Avenue Line
- Services: 4 (all times); 5 (all except late nights)
- Platforms: 2 side platforms
- Tracks: 2

Other information
- Opened: January 16, 1905; 121 years ago
- Accessible: Yes
Services
Preceding station	New York City Subway	Following station
Brooklyn Bridge–City Hall 4 5 via 138th Street–Grand Concourse	4 (New York City Subway service) 5 (New York City Subway service)	Wall Street 4 5 via Franklin Avenue–Medgar Evers College
Track layout
Station service legend
Symbol	Description
Stops all times except late nights	Stops all times except late nights
Stops all times	Stops all times

New York City Landmark
- Designated: October 23, 1979
- Reference no.: 1096

The Fulton Street station on the IRT Lexington Avenue Line has two tracks and two side platforms. It is situated underneath Broadway between Cortlandt Street to the south and Fulton Street to the north. The 4 train stops here at all times, while the 5 train stops here at all times except late nights. The station is between Brooklyn Bridge–City Hall to the north and Wall Street to the south. The platforms were originally 350 feet (110 m) long, like at other Contract 2 stations, but were lengthened during the 1959 expansion of the station.

As with other stations built as part of the original IRT, the station was constructed using a cut-and-cover method. The tunnel is covered by a U-shaped trough that contains utility pipes and wires. This trough contains a foundation of concrete no less than 4 inches (100 mm) thick. Each platform consists of 3-inch-thick (7.6 cm) concrete slabs, beneath which are drainage basins. The original platforms contain circular, cast-iron Doric-style columns away from the platform edge, spaced every 15 feet (4.6 m), while the platform extensions contain I-beam columns near the platform edge. Additional columns between the tracks, spaced every 5 feet (1.5 m), support the jack-arched concrete station roofs. There is a 1-inch (25 mm) gap between the trough wall and the platform walls, which are made of 4-inch (100 mm)-thick brick covered over by a tiled finish. The platform widths range from 7.5 to 19.3 feet (2.3 to 5.9 m).

There are fare control areas at platform level. The walls along the platforms near the fare control areas consist of a pink marble wainscoting on the lowest part of the wall, with bronze air vents along the wainscoting, and white glass tiles above. The platform walls are divided at 15-foot (4.6 m) intervals by pink marble pilasters, or vertical bands. In the original portion of the station, each pilaster is topped by blue-and-green tile plaques, which contain the letter "F" surrounded by a buff-yellow and blue-green Greek key carving. Above these "F" plaques are faience mosaics that depict the Clermont, the steamboat built by Robert Fulton. These mosaics are topped by blue faience swags and are connected by a faience cornice with scrolled and foliate detail. This decorative design is extended to the fare control areas adjacent to the original portions of the station. White-on-blue tile plaques with the words "Fulton Street" and floral motifs are also placed on the walls. On the northern end of the southbound platform, a 75-foot-long (23 m) granite wall separates it from the basement of 195 Broadway. Within the granite wall are bronze sliding gates and a long window separated by bronze mullions. The sliding gates used to provide access to the station before being replaced by turnstiles.

== IND Eighth Avenue Line platform ==
Fulton Street
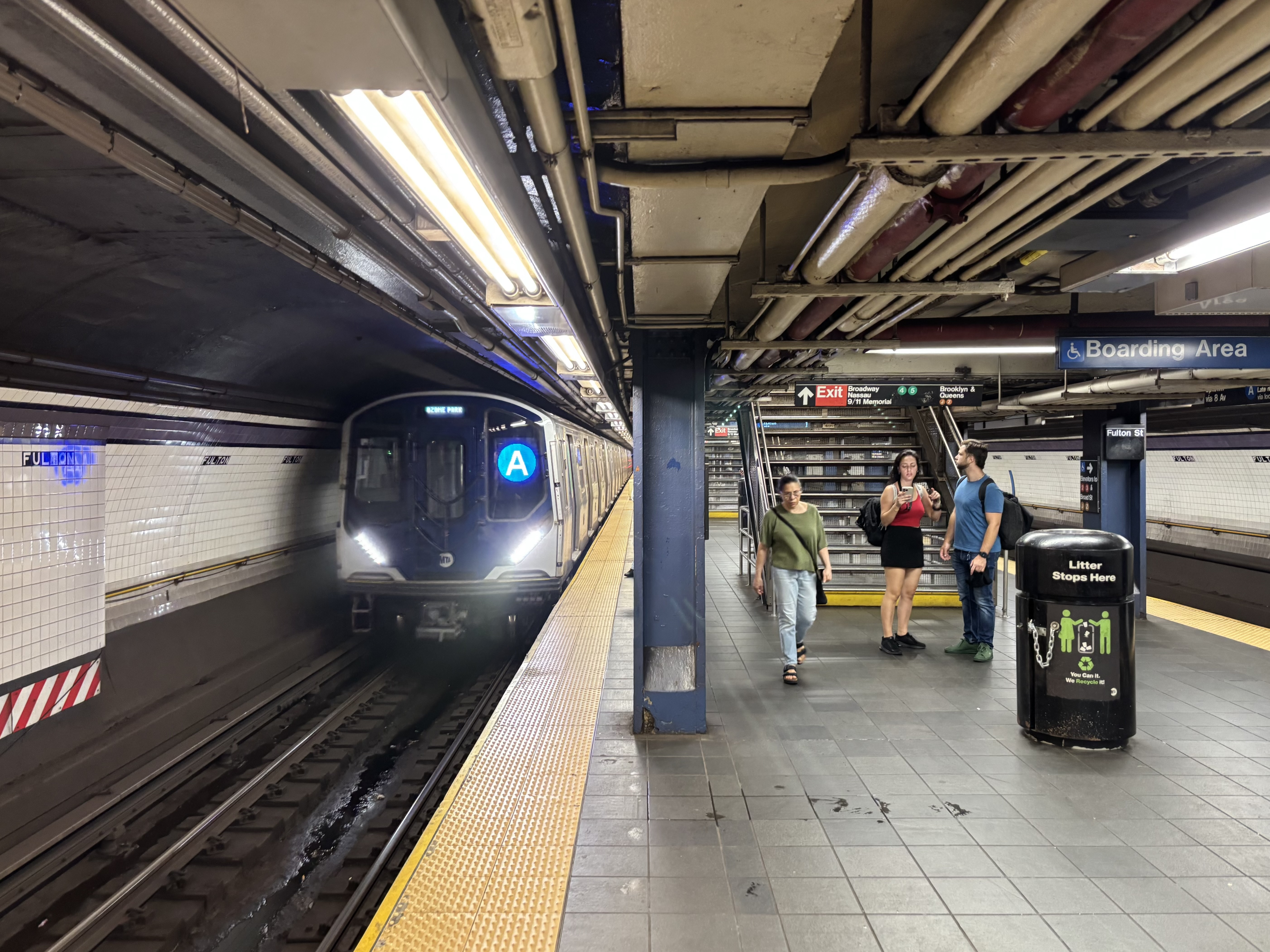
- Southbound R211A A train arriving

Station statistics
- Division: B (IND)
- Line: IND Eighth Avenue Line
- Services: A (all times); C (all except late nights)
- Platforms: 1 island platform
- Tracks: 2

Other information
- Opened: February 1, 1933; 93 years ago
- Accessible: Yes
- Former/other names: Broadway–Nassau Street
Services
Preceding station	New York City Subway	Following station
Chambers Street A C via Canal Street	A (New York City Subway service) C (New York City Subway service)	High Street A C via Hoyt–Schermerhorn Streets
Former services
Preceding station	New York City Subway	Following station
Chambers Street toward 21st Street–Queensbridge	JFK Express	Jay Street–Borough Hall toward Howard Beach–JFK Airport
Track layout
Station service legend
Symbol	Description
Stops all times except late nights	Stops all times except late nights
Stops all times	Stops all times

The Fulton Street station (formerly the Broadway–Nassau Street station) on the IND Eighth Avenue Line has two tracks and one island platform. It is situated underneath Fulton Street between Broadway to the west and William Street to the east. The A train stops here at all times, while the C train stops here at all times except late nights. The station is between Chambers Street to the north and High Street to the south.

The platform is about 22 feet (6.7 m) wide throughout the length of the station. The Fulton Street station has curved walls, with a purple tile band and wall tiles reading "FULTON". An alternating pattern of "BWAY" and "NASSAU" was the original tiling. The purple tile band is part of a color-coded tile system used throughout the IND. The tile colors were designed to facilitate navigation for travelers going away from Lower Manhattan. The purple tiles at the Fulton Street station were also used at the Chambers Street station to the north and the High Street station to the south. The tiles change color at Canal Street to the north and Jay Street to the south. According to a document detailing the IND's color-coding scheme, the Broadway–Nassau Street station's tile band was only two tiles high (as was the case at local stations), rather than three tiles high (as at express stations).

The mezzanine is split in half by the BMT Nassau Street line directly above. Therefore, the IND platform is also used by passengers transferring between from IRT Lexington and northbound BMT Nassau trains to IRT Seventh Avenue and southbound BMT Nassau trains.

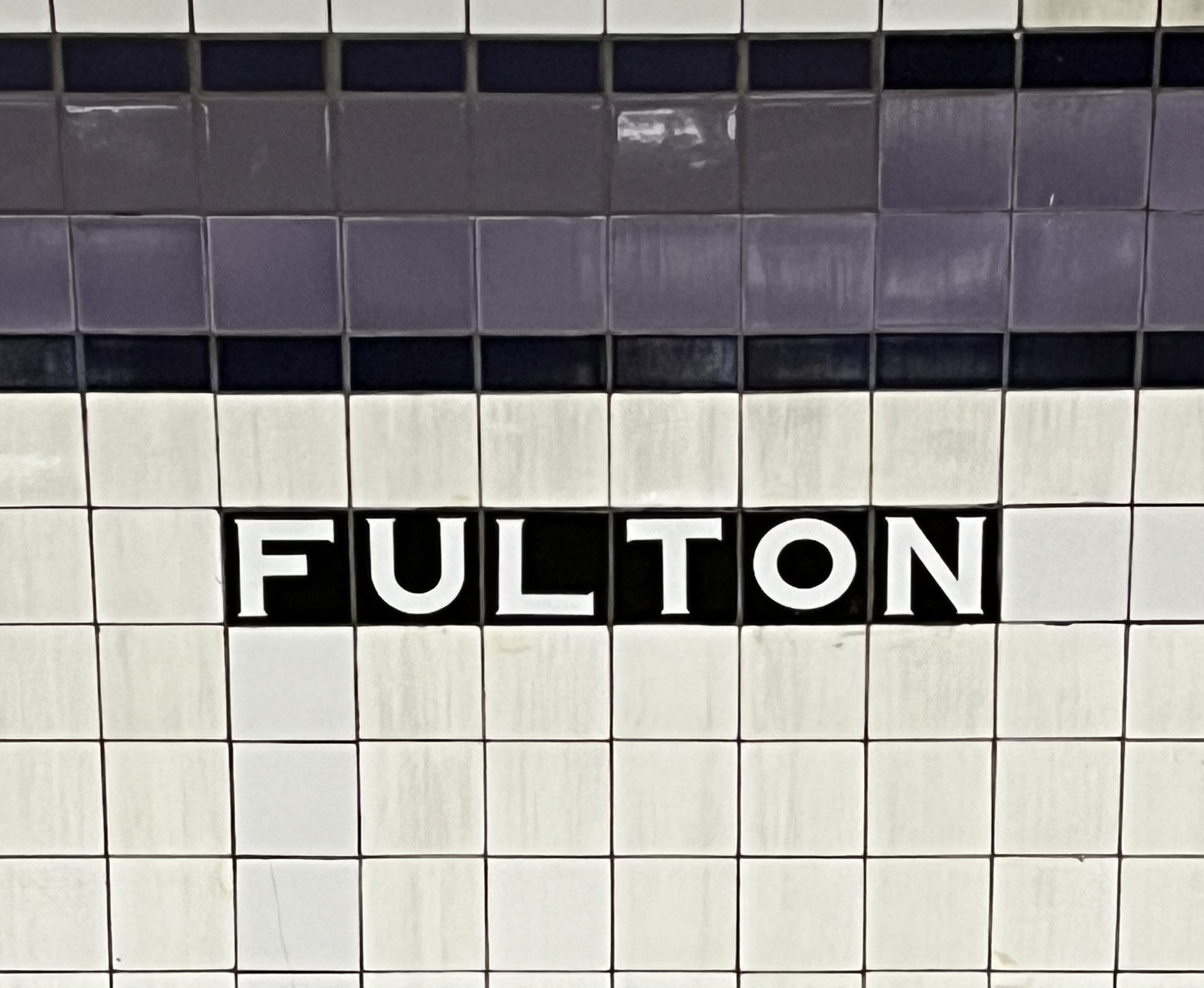
Tile caption below trim line

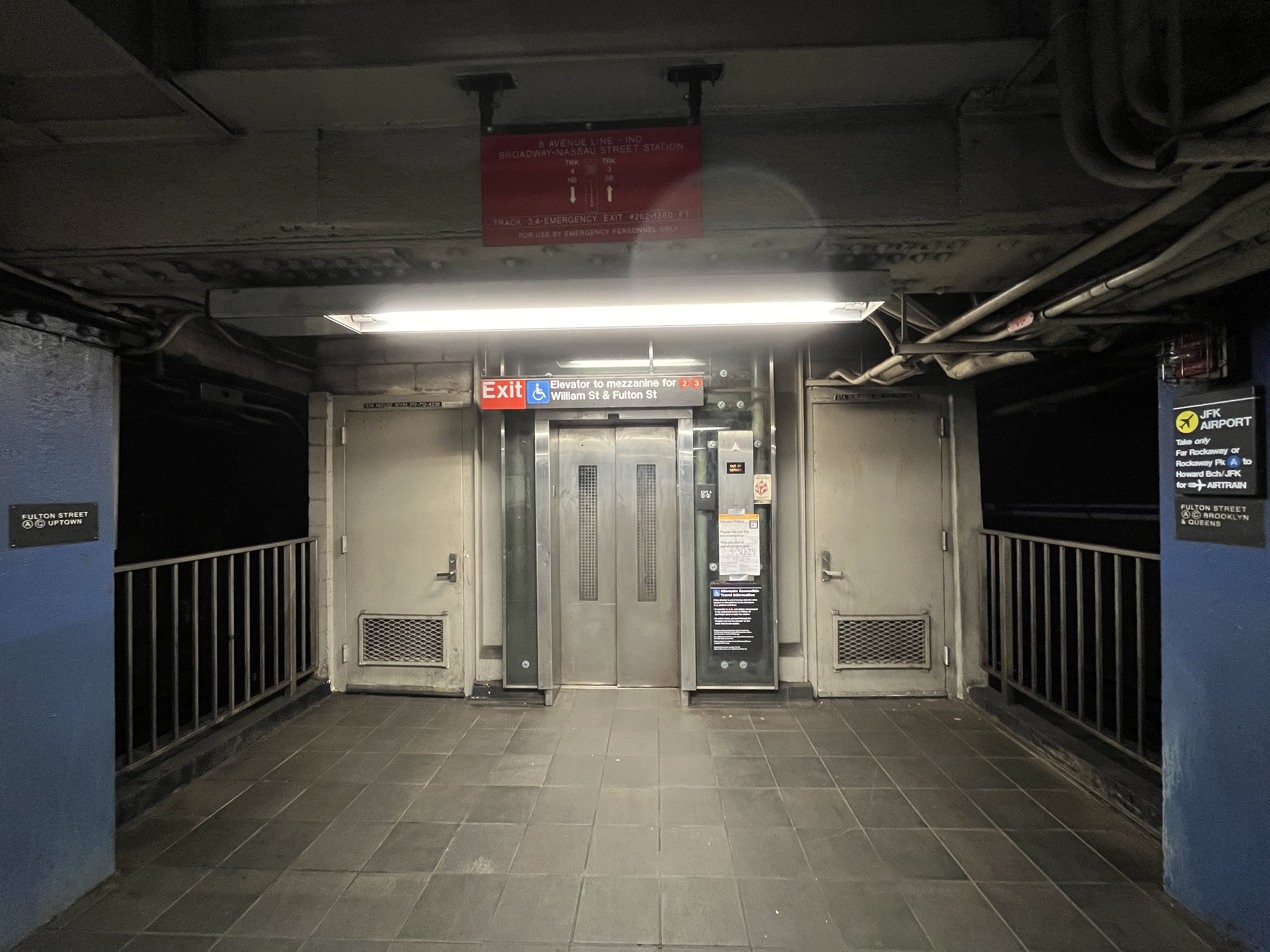
One of three elevators from the IND platform

== Ridership ==
The Fulton Street station has historically ranked among the New York City Subway's ten busiest stations. The Fulton Street station recorded 19.502 million entries in 1963, which had declined to 15.805 million in 1973.

During the 2000s, an estimated 225,000 people either entered, exited, or transferred at the station on an average day. By 2011, the Fulton Street station was the 11th-busiest in the system; at the time, an average of 63,203 riders entered the station every weekday. In 2019, the station had 27,715,365 boardings, making it the fifth most-used station in the 423-station system. This amounted to an average of 94,607 passengers per weekday. Due to the COVID-19 pandemic in New York City, ridership dropped drastically in 2020, with only 8,855,302 passengers entering the station that year. However, it was still the system's fifth most-used station.
