= Lee Harris Pomeroy =

American architect

Lee Harris Pomeroy (November 19, 1932 – February 18, 2018) was an American architect and the founding principal of the firm Lee Harris Pomeroy Architects. He was a member of the College of Fellows of the American Institute of Architects, and the Royal Institute of British Architects (RIBA). Pomeroy's work included design and planning for corporate, transportation and institutional facilities in the United States and Asia. Working with New York City Transit over many years. he completed the restoration and modernization projects for a number of historic New York City Subway stations.

== Education and Life ==
Pomeroy attended Rensselaer Polytechnic Institute, where he graduated with a Bachelor of Architecture in 1955. He followed this by obtaining his master's degree, also in architecture, from Yale in 1961. He was married to Sarah B. Pomeroy, former professor of classics at Hunter College. Their daughter, Jordana Pomeroy, is the Director of the Frost Art Museum in Miami and their son, Jeremy Pomeroy, an attorney, is the founder of the Pomeroy Law Group. Their other daughter, Alexandra (Ali) Pomeroy, a documentary filmmaker, died on February 27, 2015, at the age of 47. Lee Pomeroy died on February 18, 2018, at the age of 85.

== Career ==
Pomeroy spearheaded the conservation and modernization of many historic New York City Subway stations. His work for New York City Transit includes projects for the New York, Westchester and Boston Railroad Administration Building at East 180th Street; Broadway–Lafayette Street/Bleecker Street; DeKalb Avenue; 14th Street–Union Square; 66th Street–Lincoln Center; the Fulton Center at Fulton Street; and Fifth Avenue/53rd Street. Many of these projects involved innovative collaborations with artists engaged in the agency's Arts for Transit Program.

As part of a project by the governments of India and West Bengal to update their connected rail lines, Pomeroy's firm completed the design of six underground stations for the new Kolkata Metro Green Line. In addition to the station design, the firm was responsible for developing land use plans in the station areas. When completed, the new line will link suburban residential areas of Salt Lake and Howrah to the central business district. The new metro will connect with major rail terminals at Howrah and Sealdah, as well as an existing north–south metro line. Intermodal connections to ferries, buses, surface rail and taxis will be accessible to the line. When completed in 2015, the new line was to accommodate an estimated 480,000 passengers daily. In the Technological Development Area (TEDA) in Tianjin, China, Pomeroy designed the one million SF Binhai International Convention and Exhibition Center, built in the shape of a Chinese fan with curving steel saw tooth roof. Steel trusses suspended by cables attached to masts rising nearly 115 feet support the roof allowing for large clear spans which provide flexible exhibition space.

Pomeroy was an early proponent of adaptive reuse. His 1963 design for the Henry Street Studios in Brooklyn converted a turn of the 20th century factory building into artists’ studios and housing. The renovated candy factory in New York City's first designated historic district, the Brooklyn Heights Historic District, received a Progressive Architecture Award at a time when historic buildings were routinely being demolished rather than repurposed.

In New Rochelle, New York, Pomeroy, along with architects John Lebduska and Fred W.Lyon, designed another notable adaptive reuse project which involved the conversion of an automobile garage into an award-winning 75,000-SF, three-level New Rochelle Public Library. New Rochelle Public Library The main section of the building was refurbished from a former parking garage The project won an 'Award of Excellence for Library Architecture' from the American Institute of Architects and the American Library Association in 1980.

At the Fulton Street Pedestrian Mall, an eight block-long shopping street open only to pedestrians and public buses, in downtown Brooklyn, Pomeroy was responsible for pedestrian and traffic surveys; transportation planning, urban design and coordination of engineering consultants along with extensive community and agency involvement. He designed street furniture and equipment for the project including large, free-standing canopies, vendors’ kiosks, directory and telephone kiosks; and high mast lighting. The graphics program, which he also designed for the project, consists of informational, directional and street signage. The Mall had been in operation since the 1970s, but Pomeroy's renovation was completed in 1984; it is now one of the most profitable, culturally diverse and lively public spaces in New York City. The project was awarded an Albert S. Bard Award from the City Club of New York.

In the 1980s, Pomeroy, supported by the National Endowment for the Arts, played a key role in the establishment of the Broadway Theater District, protecting architecturally significant historic theaters from demolition while encouraging large scale commercial development through the transfer of air rights. As a consultant to Actors' Equity and New York City preservation advocates, Lee Pomeroy devised a plan to revise the design of the proposed Portman Hotel and preserve the historic Morosco and Helen Hayes Theaters. Those theaters were eventually demolished, but for his work in trying to preserve them, Pomeroy received a Certificate of Merit from the Municipal Art Society.

In the area of historic preservation, Pomeroy renovated spaces at 285 Central Park West, a building within the Central Park West Historic District into a multi-level penthouse apartment with views of Central Park. He also designed a major renovation and extension to St. James' Episcopal Church at 71st Street and Madison Avenue in Manhattan. Beginning in 2001, the church and parish house were completely rebuilt providing additional classrooms and meeting spaces, as well as a new atrium. At Trinity Church in lower Manhattan, Pomeroy was responsible for the design of a footbridge spanning Trinity Place and linking the church with its parish house.

== Other selected projects ==
- Bleecker Street Subway Station, New York, NY
- Lally School of Management, Rensselaer Polytechnic Institute, Troy, NY
- New Rochelle Public Library, New Rochelle, NY
- Plaza Hotel Renovations (canceled), New York, NY
- Ronald McDonald House, New Hyde Park, NY
- Binhai International Convention & Exhibition Centre, Tianjin, China
- East 180th Street Subway Station (former New York, Westchester and Boston Railroad Administration Building) Bronx, NY
- HBO Satellite Communications Center, Hauppauge, NY
- Skill City Master Plan, Bangalore, India
- Swiss Bank Tower, New York, NY
