= Jordana Pomeroy =

Museum director

- Occupations: Museum director, author and former curator
- Years active: 1994-present
- Known for: Director at the Patricia & Phillip Frost Art Museum
- Title: Director and CEO of Currier Museum of Art

Academic background
- Education: Bryn Mawr College, Columbia University
- Thesis: Collecting the past to create a future : the old masters, artists, and patrons in early nineteenth-century England (1996)

Academic work
- Institutions: Currier Museum of Art

Jordana Pomeroy is an American Museum director, author and former curator. She is the Director and CEO of Currier Museum of Art in Manchester, New Hampshire. She served as the Director of the Patricia & Phillip Frost Art Museum FIU from 2015 to 2024.

== Early life and education ==
Pomeroy grew up in New York City. She is the daughter of architect Lee Harris Pomeroy and historian-professor Sarah B. Pomeroy. She developed an early appreciation for art and history through family trips, including visits to architectural works by Le Corbusier as well as ancient ruins.

Pomeroy later pursued B.A. in art history from Bryn Mawr College in Pennsylvania and earned her Ph.D. in art history from Columbia University.

== Career ==
Pomeroy started working as an intern at the Museum of Modern Art while she was in high school.

After graduate school, she worked at the National Museum of Women in the Arts as the chief curator, where she published notable catalogues including contemporary Scandinavian design and 16th century Renaissance art. Later, she became the Director at the Louisiana State University Museum of Art, teaching in the museum studies department. She has also taught in Georgetown University.

Pomeroy joined the Patricia & Phillip Frost Art Museum as a director in January 2015. At the museum, she has co-curated multiple exhibitions, including Narciso Rodriguez: An Exercise in Minimalism and Marking the Infinite: Contemporary Women Artists from Aboriginal Australia.

Since September 2024, Pomeroy is the Director and CEO of Currier Museum of Art.

== Selected works ==
=== Exhibitions ===
Some of her notable exhibitions includes,

- An Imperial Collection: Women Artists from the State Hermitage Museum (2003)
- Nordic Cool: Hot Women Designers (2004)
- Italian Women Artists from Renaissance to Baroque (2007)
- Pressing Ideas: Fifty Years of Women’s Lithographs from Tamarind (2010)
- Royalists to Romantics: Women Artists from the Louvre, Versailles, and other French National Collections (2012)

=== Published works ===
- Intrepid Women: Victorian Artists Travel
- Italian Women Artists: From Renaissance to Baroque
- An Imperial Collection: Women Artists from the State Hermitage Museum
