= Closings and cancellations following the September 11 attacks =

Many closings and cancellations followed the September 11 attacks, including major landmarks, buildings, restrictions on access to Lower Manhattan, as well as postponement or cancellation of major sporting and other events. Landmarks were closed primarily because of fears that they may be attacked. At some places, streets leading up to the institutions were also closed. When they reopened, there was heightened security. Many U.S. states declared a state of emergency.

== Lower Manhattan ==
Speaking at a press conference at 11:02 a.m. on the morning of the attacks, Mayor Rudy Giuliani told New Yorkers: "If you are south of Canal Street, get out. Walk slowly and carefully. If you can't figure what else to do, just walk north." The neighborhood was covered in dust and debris, and electrical failures caused traffic light outages. Emergency vehicles were given priority to respond to ongoing fires, building collapses, and expected mass casualties. Over a million workers and residents south of Canal Street were evacuated, and police stopped pedestrians from entering Lower Manhattan. With subways shut down, vehicle traffic restricted, and tunnels closed, they mainly fled on foot, pouring over bridges and ferries to Brooklyn and New Jersey.

On September 12, vehicle traffic was banned south of 14th Street, subway stations south of Canal Street were bypassed, and pedestrians were not permitted below Chambers Street. Vehicle traffic below Canal Street was not allowed until October 13.

The New York Stock Exchange (NYSE) did not open on September 11 even as CNBC showed futures numbers early in the day. As Wall Street was covered in debris from the World Trade Center (WTC) and suffered infrastructure damage, it remained closed until September 17.

=== Bridges and tunnels ===
A variable message sign on the New Jersey Turnpike warning motorists that all road crossings into Manhattan are closed.

For at least a full day after the attacks, bridges and tunnels to Manhattan were closed to non-emergency traffic in both directions. Among other things, this interrupted scheduled deliveries of food and other perishables, leading to shortages in restaurants. Most of these reopened, fully or partially, by September 14, but vehicles were subject to security checks, and the eastbound Holland Tunnel remained closed until October 15 because of its proximity to the World Trade Center site.

Many Manhattan office workers returned to their jobs for the first time on Monday, September 24. With security restrictions creating hours-long delays, drivers entering the city experienced severe traffic jams. Officials urged commuters to take mass transit instead of driving, and a spokesman for the New York City Department of Transportation said that September 25 "might have been the worst traffic day since Henry Ford invented the car."

To alleviate the traffic, city officials activated an HOV plan that had been created in the 1980s but never used. Starting September 27, cars with only one occupant (estimated to make up 64% of vehicles entering Manhattan) were not allowed to cross any of the bridges and tunnels connecting to the island south of 63rd Street on weekdays between 6:00 and 11:00 a.m. On October 17, the ending time of the ban was moved to 10:00 a.m. An NYC DOT study found that traffic during these hours was reduced by 15%. However, many chose to enter Manhattan earlier, leading to a 26% increase in traffic during the hour between 5:00 and 6:00 a.m. Some advocated for the rule to be put in place permanently, but it was based on the city's emergency administrative powers and provoked threats of lawsuits from parking garage owners. The ban was lifted for some bridges and tunnels on April 22, 2002, though it remained in place for the Holland and Brooklyn Battery Tunnels and the Brooklyn and Manhattan Bridges. The remaining restrictions were removed on November 17, 2003.

=== Mass transit ===
==== New York City Subway ====
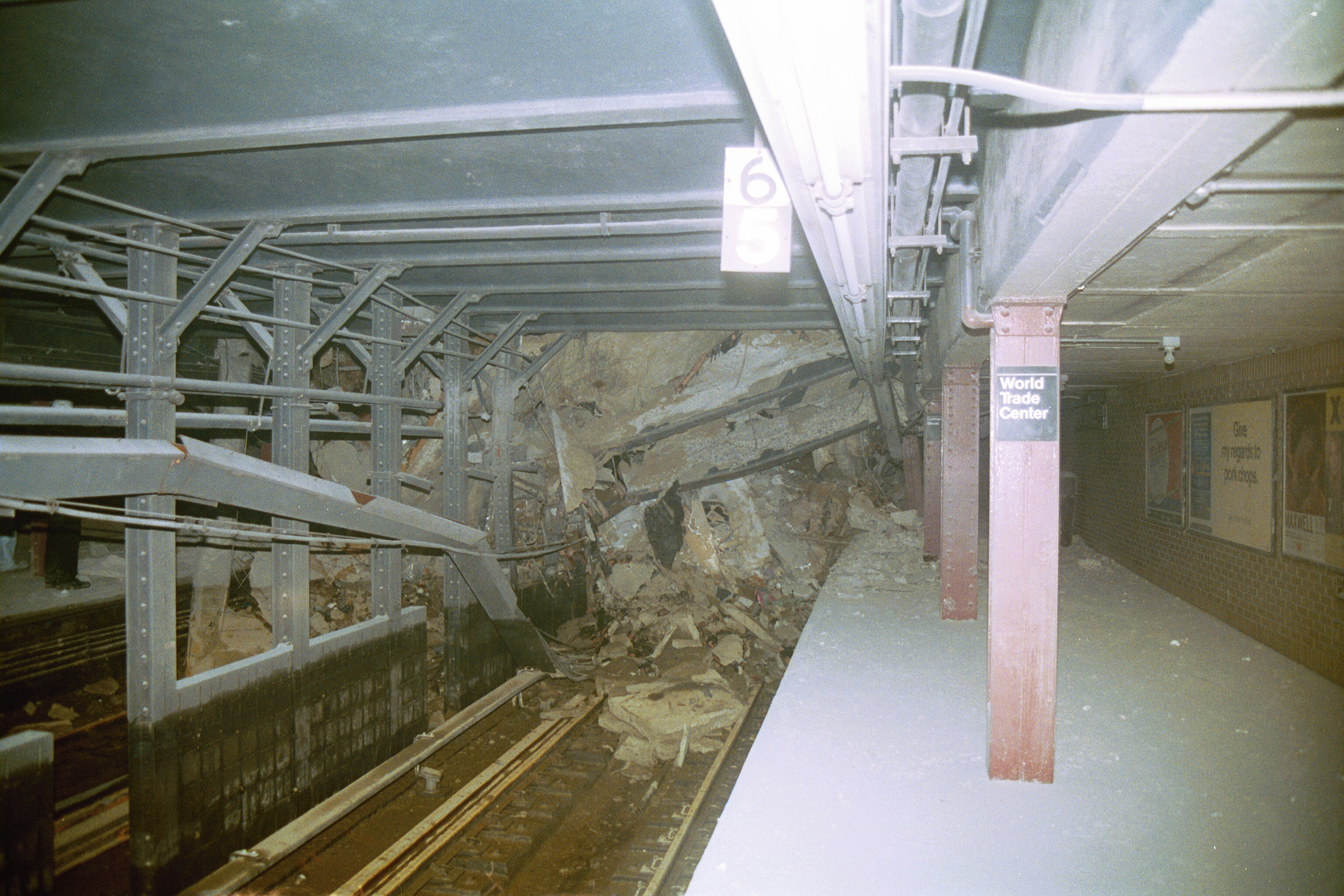
The Cortlandt Street IRT station, which was directly below the World Trade Center, after the September 11 attacks

The tracks and stations under the World Trade Center were shut down within minutes of the first plane crash. All remaining New York City Subway service was suspended from 10:20 a.m. to 12:48 p.m. Immediately after the attacks and more so after the collapses of the Twin Towers, many trains running in Lower Manhattan lost power and had to be evacuated through the tunnels. Some trains had power but the signals did not, requiring special operating procedures to ensure safety.

The IRT Broadway–Seventh Avenue Line, which ran below the World Trade Center between Chambers Street and Rector Street, was the most crippled. This section of the tunnel, including Cortlandt Street station (located directly underneath the World Trade Center), was badly damaged, and had to be rebuilt. Service was immediately suspended south of Chambers Street and then cut back to 14th Street. There was also subsequent flooding on the line south of 34th Street–Penn Station. After the flood was cleaned up, express service was able to resume on September 17 with 1 trains running between Van Cortlandt Park–242nd Street and 14th Street, making local stops north of and express stops south of 96th Street, while 2 and 3 trains made all stops in Manhattan (but bypassed all stations between Canal Street and Fulton Street until October 1). 1/9 skip-stop service was suspended.

After a few switching delays at 96th Street, service was changed on September 19. The 1 train resumed local service in Manhattan, but was extended to New Lots Avenue in Brooklyn (switching onto the express tracks at Chambers Street) to replace the 3, which now terminated at 14th Street as an express. The 2 train continued to make local stops in Manhattan and service between Chambers Street and South Ferry as well as skip-stop service remained suspended. Normal service on all four trains was restored September 15, 2002, but Cortlandt Street remained closed until September 8, 2018.

Service on the BMT Broadway Line was also disrupted because the tracks from the Montague Street Tunnel run adjacent to the World Trade Center and there were concerns that train movements could cause unsafe settling of the debris pile. Cortlandt Street station, which sits under Church Street, sustained significant damage in the collapse of the towers. It was closed until September 15, 2002 for removal of debris, structural repairs, and restoration of the track beds, which had suffered flood damage in the aftermath of the collapse. Starting September 17, 2001, N and R service was suspended and respectively replaced by the M (which was extended to Coney Island–Stillwell Avenue via the BMT Montague Street Tunnel, BMT Fourth Avenue Line, and BMT Sea Beach Line) and the J (also extended via Fourth Avenue to Bay Ridge–95th Street). In Queens, the Q replaced the R while the W replaced the N. All service on the BMT Broadway Line ran local north of Canal Street except for the <Q>, which ran normally from 57th Street to Brighton Beach via Broadway and Brighton Express. J/Z skip-stop service was suspended at this time. Normal service on all seven trains resumed on October 28.

The IND Eighth Avenue Line, which has a stub terminal serving the E train under Five World Trade Center, was undamaged, but covered in soot. E trains were extended to Euclid Avenue, Brooklyn, replacing the then suspended C train (the A and D trains replaced it as the local north of 59th Street–Columbus Circle on nights and weekends, respectively. The B train, which ran normally from 145th Street or Bedford Park Boulevard to 34th Street–Herald Square via Central Park West Local, also replaced C trains on weekdays). Service was cut back to Canal Street when C service resumed on September 21, but Chambers Street and Broadway–Nassau Street remained closed until October 1. World Trade Center remained closed until January 2002.

The only subway line running between Midtown and Lower Manhattan nearby the former World Trade Center Complex was the IRT Lexington Avenue Line, which was overcrowded before the attacks and at crush density until the BMT Broadway Line reopened. Wall Street was closed until September 21.

The IND 6th Avenue line and BMT Nassau Street line were the only two routes in lower Manhattan to be completely unaffected by the 9/11 attacks due to them not being near the complex itself.

There were no reported casualties on the subway or loss of train cars, but a Motor Coach Industries coach bus was destroyed. Another bus was damaged, but was repaired and returned to normal service with a special commemoration livery.

==== PATH ====
PATH started evacuating passengers from its Manhattan trains and tracks within minutes of the first plane crash. The PATH station at World Trade Center was heavily damaged, and all services were suspended. For several hours, PATH did not run any trains to Manhattan, but was able to restore service on the Uptown Hudson Tubes to 33rd Street by the afternoon. Exchange Place was unusable since the switch configuration at the time required all trains to continue to World Trade Center. As a result, PATH ran a modified service: Hoboken-Journal Square, Hoboken-33rd Street, and Newark-33rd Street. Exchange Place reopened with modifications on June 29, 2003; a temporary station replacing World Trade Center opened on November 23.

==== Ferries ====
Liberty Water Taxi and NY Waterway had a ferry terminal at the World Financial Center. As the area around the terminal was in the restricted zone, NY Waterway suspended service to the terminal with alternate service going to Midtown and Wall Street and Liberty Water Taxi service was suspended. Free ad-hoc ferry service to New Jersey, Brooklyn, and Queens began by evening, with about half a million evacuees transported by Circle Line Tours, NY Waterway, privately owned dining boats, tug boats, and at least one fire boat.

==== Buses ====
Metropolitan Transportation Authority buses were temporarily suspended south of Canal Street.

==== Intercity transit ====
The Port Authority Bus Terminal was closed until September 13. Amtrak suspended all of its rail service nationwide until 6pm, but by September 13 it had increased its capacity by 30% to deal with an influx of stranded flight passengers. Greyhound Bus Lines cancelled its bus service in the Northeast, but was running normally by September 13.

== North American airspace ==
The entire airspaces of the United States and Canada were closed ("ground stop") by order of FAA National Operations Manager Ben Sliney (who was working his first day in that position) except for military, police, and medical flights. The unprecedented implementation of Security Control of Air Traffic and Air Navigation Aids (SCATANA) was the first unplanned closure in the U.S.; military exercises known as Operation Skyshield had temporarily closed the airspace in the early 1960s. Domestic planes were diverted to the nearest available airport, and grounded passengers and planes were searched for security threats. United Airlines cancelled all flights worldwide temporarily. President George W. Bush was transported to a secure location via Air Force One. Many incoming international flights were diverted to Atlantic Canada to avoid proximity to potential targets in the United States and large cities in Canada. Some international flights that departed from South America were diverted to Mexico, as its airspace was not shut down.

During the closure of American airspace, there were only a few civilian flights which received special approval to fly from the FAA, such as the Civil Air Patrol's aerial photography unit which conducted aerial surveys of the damage to New York.

On Thursday night, the New York area airports (JFK, LaGuardia, and Newark) were closed again and reopened the next morning. Civilian air traffic was allowed to resume on September 13, with stricter airport security checks, disallowing for example the box cutting knives that were used by the hijackers. (Reinforcement of cockpit doors began in October 2001, and was required for larger airlines by 2003.) First, stranded planes were allowed to fly to their intended destinations, then limited service resumed. The backlog of delayed passengers took several days to clear.

Due to a translation error, controllers believed Korean Air Flight 85 might have been hijacked. Canadian Prime Minister Jean Chrétien and U.S. authorities ordered the United States Air Force to surround the plane and force it to land in Whitehorse, Yukon and to shoot down the plane if the pilots did not cooperate. Alaska Governor Tony Knowles ordered the evacuation of large hotels and government buildings in Anchorage. Also in Alaska at nearby Valdez, the U.S. Coast Guard ordered all tankers filling up with oil to head out to sea. Canadian officials evacuated all schools and large buildings in Whitehorse before the plane landed safely.

== Precautionary building closings and evacuations ==
Many businesses across the United States closed after the intentional nature of the events became clear, and many national landmarks and financial district skyscrapers were evacuated out of fear of further attacks.

=== United States ===
- United Nations Headquarters Building in New York City
- Most skyscrapers in New York City (including the Chrysler Building and Empire State Building, which was evacuated several times on September 11 and after due to false reports of potential threats), Chicago (including Sears Tower) and Philadelphia
- The Washington Monument in Washington, D.C.
- The Statue of Liberty, Ellis Island and ferries to both in and out of New York City
- All state capitols and many government buildings surrounding the capitols
- Many landmarks in the United States, including the Mall of America outside of Minneapolis, Minnesota and the Space Needle and Columbia Center in Seattle, Washington
- All federal buildings in Washington, D.C., including the White House, the United States Capitol, the United States Supreme Court Building and Blair House. Across the country, approximately one million federal workers were sent home
- The D.C. Department of Motor Vehicles (although all other D.C. government offices remained open)
- The United States Patent and Trademark Office
- NASA, including all field centers and the agency's headquarters in Washington, D.C.
- Resorts and vacation spots including:
  - Disneyland and Knott's Berry Farm (only on September 11)
  - Walt Disney World (only on September 11)
  - Universal Studios Florida
  - Universal Studios Hollywood
  - SeaWorld
  - Six Flags
- All television and movie studios in Hollywood, Los Angeles, California
- All Westfield shopping centers, malls and shoppingtowns nationwide, as they owned the underground shopping mall at the World Trade Center
- The John Hancock Tower and Prudential Tower in Boston
- Enron Complex and several other skyscrapers in Downtown Houston
- The Transamerica Pyramid in San Francisco
- Several buildings in downtown Cleveland including Terminal Tower, the Anthony J. Celebrezze Federal Building and Key Tower
- The U.S. Steel Tower in Pittsburgh
- The Renaissance Center in Detroit
- The IDS Tower in Minneapolis
- Bank of America and Wachovia headquarters towers in Uptown Charlotte
- The World Trade Center in Saint Paul, Minnesota
- OneAmerica Tower in Indianapolis
- HSBC Tower in Buffalo, New York
- AXA Towers in Syracuse, New York
- Sunset Bronson Studios in Hollywood
- AOL Headquarters in Dulles, Virginia

=== International ===
- (Canada) Toronto: CN Tower, Toronto-Dominion Centre, Toronto Stock Exchange
- Ottawa: Parliament Hill, Supreme Court of Canada
- (United Kingdom) London: Canary Wharf, Lloyd's building, Stock Exchange Tower, NatWest Tower
- (Malaysia) Kuala Lumpur: Petronas Towers

== Government and cultural cancellations and postponements ==
In an atmosphere reminiscent of the assassination of John F. Kennedy in 1963, everyday life in many places around the world came to a standstill in the days after the September 11 attacks. For this reason, as well as for reasons of perceived threat associated with large gatherings, many events were postponed or cancelled. Other events were also cancelled, postponed, or modified:

- Voting on September 11 in the New York City mayoral primary was halted. Elections in Syracuse and Buffalo, New York were also delayed.
- The Commonwealth Heads of Government Meeting (CHOGM), with the Heads of Government of the Commonwealth of Nations to be held in Brisbane, the state capital of Queensland, Australia, was postponed. The organizers of the meeting claimed it was not so much a fear of terrorist attack on the meeting itself, but a desire by many Commonwealth leaders to stay at home in case of any further crisis-making world events (such as the commencement of overt military action in Afghanistan or elsewhere). The CHOGM was eventually convened at Coolum Beach, Queensland.
- The Mexican Independence Parade scheduled for September 16 in Mexico City was delayed one day in a show of compassion; many other independence celebrations were held on the 16th without fireworks.
- Clothing retailer Abercrombie & Fitch canceled its Christmas 2001 issue of A&F Quarterly because the company felt the tone of the publication was not suitable for the mood at that time.

== See also ==
Air traffic control during the September 11 attacks
