= Chambers Street–World Trade Center/Park Place/Cortlandt Street station =

New York City Subway station in Manhattan

Chambers Street World Trade Center Park Place Cortlandt Street
- New York City Subway station complex
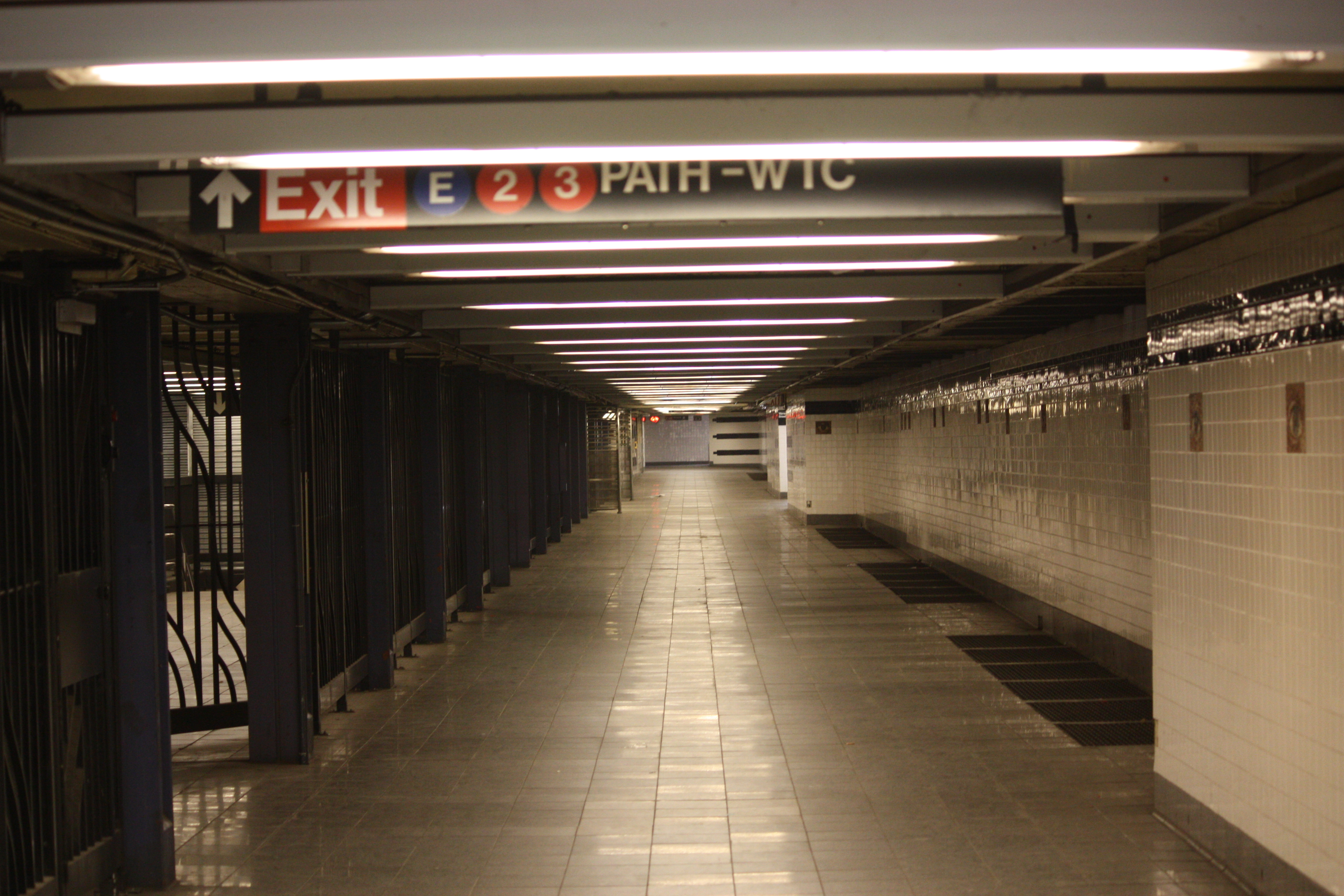
- Passageway between Eighth Avenue and Seventh Avenue lines

Station statistics
- Address: Church Street between Chambers Street & Vesey Street; New York, New York
- Borough: Manhattan
- Locale: Financial District, Tribeca, World Trade Center
- Coordinates: 40.712655°N 74.009657°W
- Division: IRT/IND/BMT
- Line: IND Eighth Avenue Line; IRT Broadway–Seventh Avenue Line; BMT Broadway Line
- Services: 2 (all times); 3 (all except late nights); A (all times); C (all except late nights); E (all times); N (late nights); R (all except late nights); W (weekdays only)
- Transit: NYCT Bus: M9, M20, M22, M55, X27, X28, SIM1, SIM1C, SIM2, SIM3C, SIM4, SIM4C, SIM15, SIM32, SIM33C, SIM34; MTA Bus: BxM18, BM1, BM2, BM3, BM4, QM7, QM8, QM11, QM25, QM65; NJT Bus: 120; At Fulton Street via Fulton Center: 2 (all times) 3 (all except late nights) 4 (all times) 5 (all except late nights) A (all times) C (all except late nights) J (all times) Z (rush hours, peak direction); At WTC Cortlandt: 1 (all times); PATH: NWK–WTC and HOB–WTC (at World Trade Center)
- Structure: Underground
- Levels: 2

Other information
- Accessible: Partially (IND local platform and BMT platforms only)

Traffic
- 2025: 13,970,793 ▲5.5%
- Rank: 11 out of 423
Location
Location within New York City Subway
Location within New York City
Location within New York
Street map
Station service legend
Symbol	Description
Stops all times except late nights	Stops all times except late nights
Stops all times	Stops all times
Stops weekdays during the day	Stops weekdays during the day
Stops late nights only	Stops late nights only
Stops rush hours in the peak direction only	Stops rush hours in the peak direction only

The Chambers Street–World Trade Center/Park Place/Cortlandt Street station is a New York City Subway station complex on the IND Eighth Avenue Line, IRT Broadway–Seventh Avenue Line, and BMT Broadway Line. Located on Church Street between Chambers and Cortlandt Streets in the Financial District of Manhattan, it is served by the 2, A and E trains at all times; W train on weekdays; 3, C and R trains at all times except late nights; and N train during late nights.

The station also connects to the PATH via the World Trade Center Transportation Hub, and to the nearby Fulton Center via the Dey Street Passageway.

== History ==
=== IND Eighth Avenue Line ===
==== Construction and opening ====
New York City mayor John Francis Hylan's original plans for the Independent Subway System (IND), proposed in 1922, included building over 100 miles (160 km) of new lines and taking over nearly 100 miles (160 km) of existing lines, which would compete with the IRT and the Brooklyn–Manhattan Transit Corporation (BMT), the two major subway operators of the time. On December 9, 1924, the New York City Board of Transportation (BOT) gave preliminary approval for the construction of the IND Eighth Avenue Line. This line consisted of a corridor connecting Inwood, Manhattan, to Downtown Brooklyn, running largely under Eighth Avenue but also paralleling Greenwich Avenue and Sixth Avenue in Lower Manhattan. The BOT announced a list of stations on the new line in February 1928, with a station near the intersection of Church and Fulton Streets.

Work on the IND Eighth Avenue Line began in 1925. Most of the Eighth Avenue Line was dug using a cheap cut-and-cover method. As part of the project, Church Street was widened, allowing the line's four tracks to be placed on one level rather than two. By August 1930, the BOT reported that the Eighth Avenue Line was nearly completed, except for the stations between Chambers Street–Hudson Terminal and West Fourth Street, which were only 21 percent completed. The entire line was completed by September 1931, except for the installation of turnstiles. A preview event for the new subway was hosted on September 8, 1932, two days before the official opening. The Chambers Street and Hudson Terminal stations on the Eighth Avenue Line opened just after midnight on September 10, 1932, as the southern terminus of the city-operated IND's initial segment, the Eighth Avenue Line between Chambers Street–Hudson Terminal and 207th Street.

==== Later years ====
A passageway from the express platform to the Hudson & Manhattan Railroad (H&M)'s Hudson Terminal was opened in 1949, after 14 months of construction. The passageway measured 14 feet (4.3 m) wide and 90 feet (27 m) long. Construction contractor Great Atlantic Construction Company described the tunnel as "one of the most difficult of engineering feats", as the passageway had to pass above the H&M tunnels while avoiding various pipes, wires, water mains, and cable car lines.

In April 1993, the New York State Legislature agreed to give the MTA $9.6 billion for capital improvements. Some of the funds would be used to renovate nearly one hundred New York City Subway stations, including Chambers Street and World Trade Center. A late-1990s renovation saw prefabricated tile panels installed on the trackside wall of the express platform, with a tile band of Concord Violet bordered in black and "CHAMBERS" in white Copperplate lettering on black tiles on each panel, and on the local platform's walls the new tiles were installed in 3-by-2-foot (0.91 by 0.61 m) sections with a slightly different shade of dark blue violet bordered in black; no station name captions were placed. The trim lines in the entryways and passages use the Concord Violet color rather than the blue violet.

Around 2:00 p.m. on January 23, 2005, a fire destroyed the interlocking plant at Chambers Street. As a result, two-thirds of A trains were canceled or rerouted, including all rush-hour trips to Rockaway Park–Beach 116th Street. C service was completely suspended and replaced by the A and V in Brooklyn and A, B, D, and E in Manhattan. Some newspaper articles blamed the fire on a homeless person trying to keep warm, but that was never confirmed. Until January 28, the MTA rerouted the A to the Rutgers Street Tunnel during late nights. Initial estimates gave a time of three to five years to restore full service because the destroyed equipment was custom-made for the MTA. That was later cut back to six to nine months to bring back normal operations. However, C service and 70% of A service was restored ten days after the fire, and the rush-hour A trips were restored on February 14, with full service returning on April 21. However, effects of the fire continued into 2006 because the equipment had not been replaced.

=== IRT Broadway–Seventh Avenue Line ===
The Interborough Rapid Transit Company (IRT)'s Broadway–Seventh Avenue Line first opened as a shuttle to 34th Street–Penn Station on June 3, 1917. The line was extended south to South Ferry on July 1, 1918; the Park Place station opened on the same date, and was served by a shuttle between Chambers Street and Wall Street, on the line's Brooklyn Branch. The new "H" system was implemented on August 1, 1918, joining the two halves of the Broadway–Seventh Avenue Line and sending all West Side trains south from Times Square. As a result, shuttle service to this station was replaced by through service.

The city government took over the IRT's operations on June 12, 1940. During the 1964–1965 fiscal year, the platforms at Park Place, along with those at four other stations on the Broadway–Seventh Avenue Line, were lengthened to 525 feet (160 m) to accommodate a ten-car train of 51-foot (16 m) IRT cars.

After the New York State Legislature gave the MTA funding for capital improvements in 1993, the MTA used some of these funds to renovate the Park Place station. Between April 3 and October 1, 1999, this station was closed for escalator replacement and a station rehabilitation. During mid-2026, when the adjacent portion of the Broadway–Seventh Avenue Line was closed during weekends, the MTA rehabilitated the Park Place station.

=== BMT Broadway Line ===
==== Opening and 20th-century modifications ====
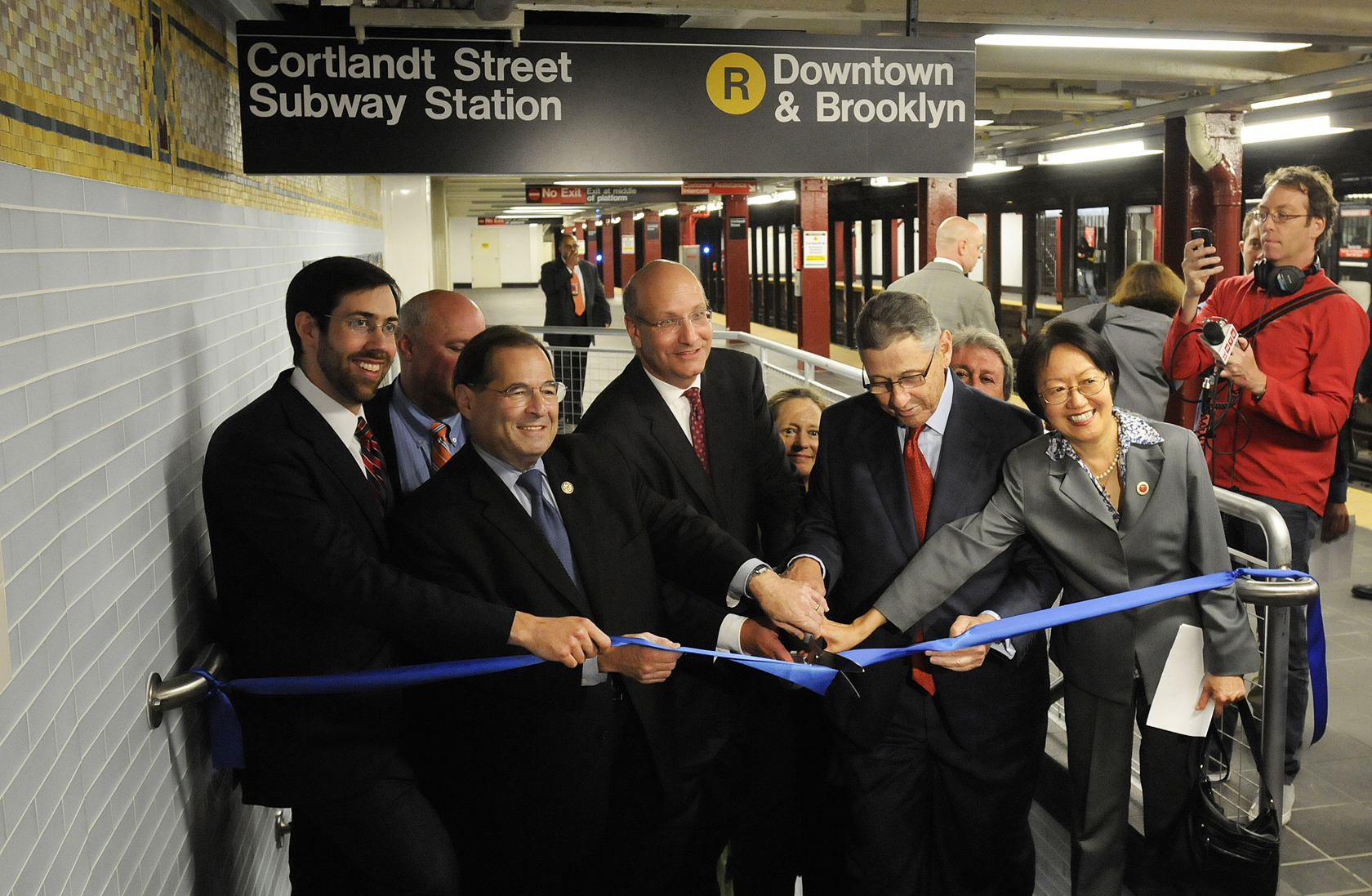
Ribbon cutting for the reopening of the southbound BMT platform

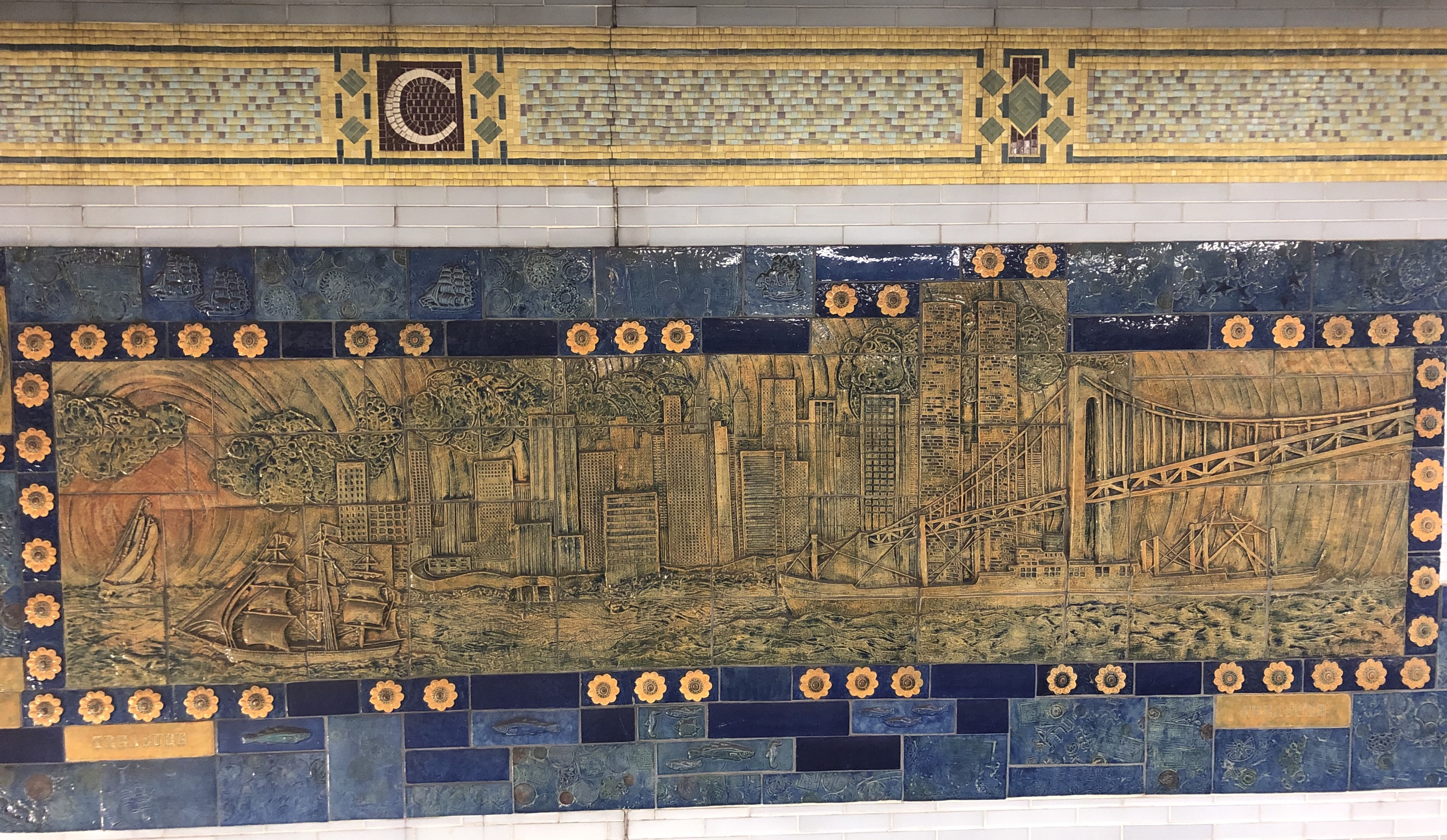
Tile work on BMT platform includes ships of sail and diesel, the Twin Towers of the original World Trade Center, Lower Manhattan skyline, and the never realized Brooklyn-Battery Bridge.

The Cortlandt Street station on the Brooklyn–Manhattan Transit Corporation (BMT)'s Broadway Line opened on January 5, 1918. The station's platforms originally could only fit six 67-foot-long (20 m) cars. In 1926, the New York City Board of Transportation received bids for the lengthening of platforms at nine stations on the Broadway Line, including the Cortlandt Street station, to accommodate eight-car trains. Edwards & Flood submitted a low bid of $101,775 for the project. The platform-lengthening project was completed in 1927, bringing the length of the platforms to 535 feet (163 m). The city government took over the BMT's operations on June 1, 1940.

The station was overhauled in the late 1970s, with repairs made to the structural and cosmetic appearance. The original BMT wall tiles were removed and the "new" station walls contained cinderblock tiles (colored white with small recesses painted yellow), with black and white station-name signs bolted into the recesses. Lighting was converted from incandescent to fluorescent and staircases and platform edges were repaired.

After the New York State Legislature gave the MTA funding for capital improvements in 1993, the MTA used some of these funds to renovate the Cortlandt Street station. Much of the cosmetic change that came with the 1970s renovation was undone in a 1998–1999 renovation. In addition to "state-of-repair" work and upgrades for ADA accessibility, the station's original 1918 tilework was restored. Other improvements were made to the public address system, directional signage, and concrete trackbeds.

==== Post-9/11 ====
During the September 11 attacks in 2001, a train operator reported an "explosion" to the MTA's Subway Control Center one minute after the first plane struck the World Trade Center's North Tower at 8:46 a.m. Subway service was halted shortly afterward, and as a result, no one in the subway system died. The station sustained significant damage during the collapse of the World Trade Center. It was closed for repairs, which included removal of debris, fixing structural damage, and restoring the track beds, which had suffered flood damage in the aftermath of the collapse. The station reopened on September 15, 2002.

On August 20, 2005, the station was closed again for construction of the Dey Street Passageway below Dey Street as part of the Fulton Center project. At the same time, the station was made ADA-accessible in both directions. Previously, the station was accessible on the southbound side only via the temporary PATH World Trade Center station's elevator. MTA posters and flyers at that time indicated the station would reopen in the spring of 2006, and later by spring of 2007. The northbound side of the station was rebuilt and finally reopened on November 25, 2009. The rebuilt southbound platform reopened on September 6, 2011, while continuing excavation along the Church Street side of the World Trade Center site was being performed.

The Dey Street Passageway, outside of the fare control, connects the Fulton Street station complex to the Cortlandt Street station and to the World Trade Center Transportation Hub. It opened on November 10, 2014, while the World Trade Center was still under construction. With the opening of the Dey Street Passageway, ridership at the station nearly tripled, from 1,500,040 in 2014 to 4,270,036 in 2016. On December 29, 2017, the Cortlandt Street station was connected to the other platforms in the complex. That date also saw the opening of a passageway connecting the World Trade Center station with 2 World Trade Center, and passageways connecting the southbound platform of Cortlandt Street to the Transportation Hub's Oculus head house and to 4 World Trade Center. Fare control areas had to be reconfigured. In 2024, Skanska was hired to replace 21 escalators across the New York City Subway system for $146 million, including two escalators at the Park Place station.

== Station layout ==
=== Exits ===
Exits/entrances through turnstiles to Church Street are located in the mezzanine of the IND station, along with a few High Entrance-Exit Turnstiles (HEETs). There are street stairs:

- at all four corners of Church and Chambers Streets
- at both western corners of Church and Warren Streets
- at both western corners of Church and Murray Streets
- at all four corners of Church Street and Park Place; there is also an elevator to the local platform at the southeastern corner
- at the southwestern corner of Church and Barclay Streets
- at the northwestern and southeastern corners of Church and Vesey Streets
- at the northeastern corner of Church and Fulton Streets

There is also a passageway to the PATH station at the extreme southern end of the local IND platform (see § Accessibility), providing ADA-accessible access to the local platform.

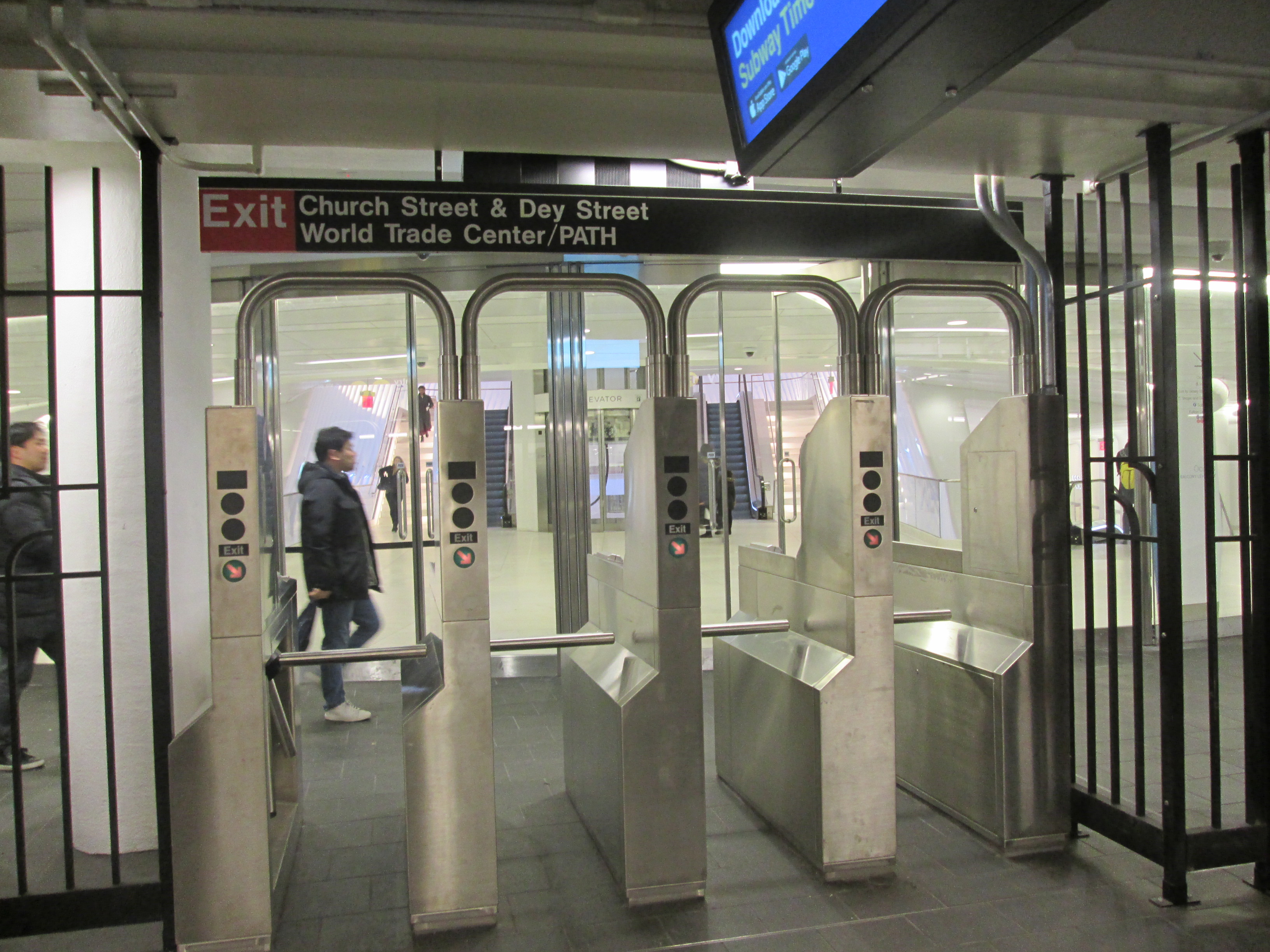
Connection to the World Trade Center Transportation Hub from the BMT platform

The IRT platform has its own entrance/exit at its extreme eastern (railroad south) end. Here, a staircase and two escalators, none of which are together, lead up to a mezzanine just beneath the street. The staircase splits into two separate staircases at an initial landing and each of those have another intermediate landing. On this mezzanine, there are turnstiles, both regular and HEET (from when the mezzanine had a part-time token booth and the regular turnstiles could not be left unstaffed). A single street stair leads out to the northwest corner of Broadway and Park Place. The signage for this entrance is the only one in the complex that says "Park Place" with bullets only for the 2 and 3 trains. This stair is very close to the BMT Broadway Line's City Hall station, an entrance to which is about 200 feet (61 m) away, on the other side of Broadway. A short staircase in that mezzanine once led to an entrance to the lobby of the Woolworth Building. It has been closed since the September 11 attacks.

Both eastern corners of Church and Dey Streets contain a staircase exit from the northbound BMT platform, and a staircase to the northeast corner of Church and Cortlandt Streets leads to the same platform. The BMT platform is ADA-accessible via the Dey Street Passageway, an underpass that runs to the World Trade Center Transportation Hub and the Fulton Center. An underground passageway also leads to One Liberty Plaza. An exit at the north end of the southbound BMT platform once led to the original World Trade Center's lower concourse, and now leads to the Westfield World Trade Center shopping mall and the World Trade Center subway station.

== IND Eighth Avenue Line platforms ==
The Chambers Street–World Trade Center station on the IND Eighth Avenue Line is an express station with four tracks and two island platforms, but in an unusual layout: the station has separate island platforms for through and terminating trains. Both island platforms can accommodate 600-foot (180 m) trains. There is a passenger connection between the two platforms at mezzanine level. This passageway also includes the in-system transfer to the IRT station. The only transfer between the local platform and the express platform is available only at the very tips of both platforms, where the two platforms are opposite each other for a few feet. Passengers must walk down the express platform to the southernmost staircase, go up to a different part of the mezzanine, crossover, and then go down a staircase to the northern end of the local platform. This complex transfer is to allow a continued underground mezzanine outside of fare control from the southern end at the World Trade Center, which is just one block west of the Fulton Street station on the IND Eighth Avenue Line, to the most northern street stairs at Chambers and Church Street, which is just one block east of the Chambers Street station of the IRT Broadway–Seventh Avenue Line. The total length of the mezzanine is seven blocks.

=== Chambers Street ===
Chambers Street
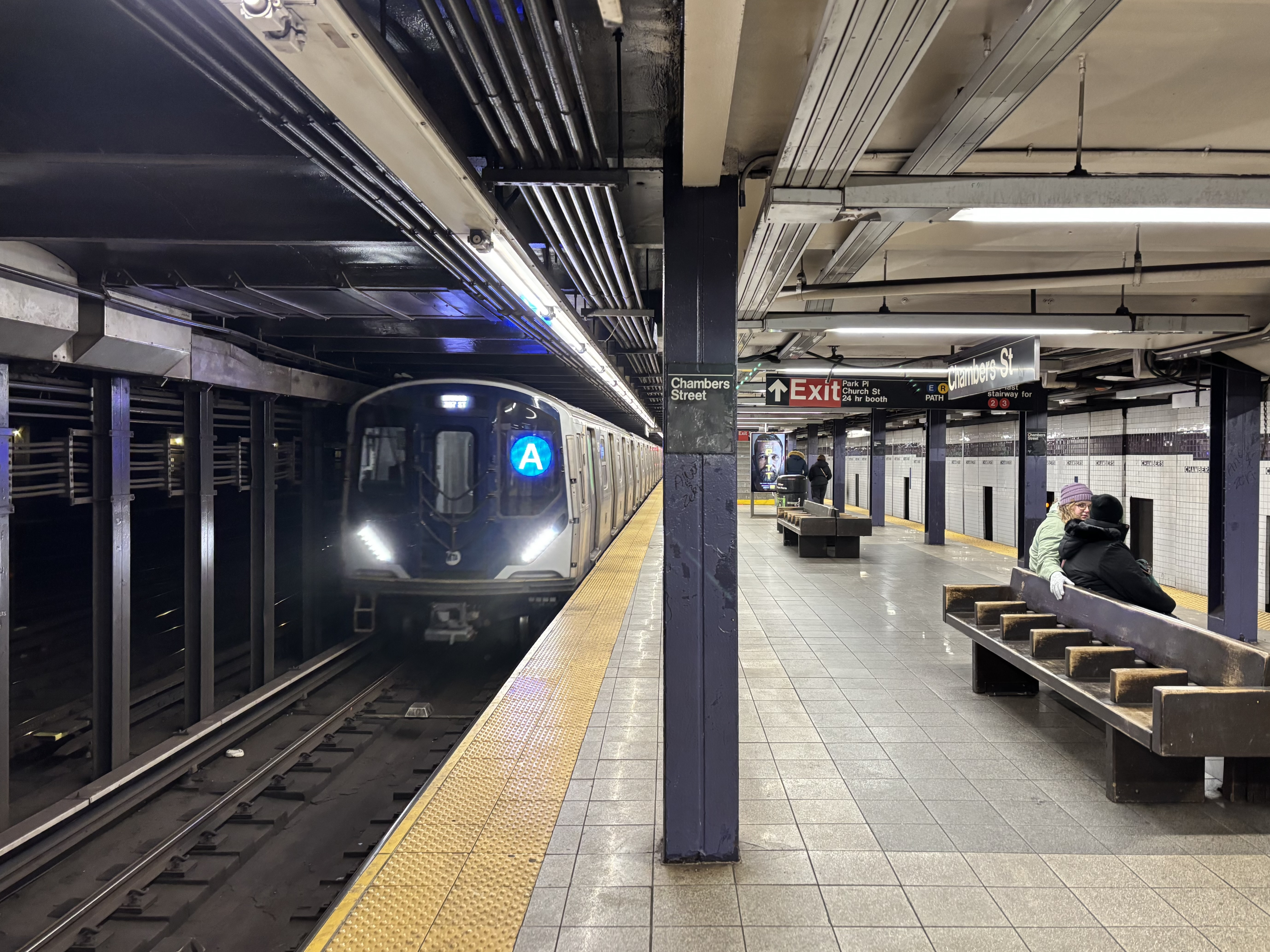
- Northbound R211A A train arriving

Station statistics
- Address: Church Street between Chambers Street & Vesey Street; New York, New York
- Borough: Manhattan
- Locale: Financial District
- Division: B (IND)
- Line: IND Eighth Avenue Line
- Services: A (all times); C (all except late nights)
- Platforms: 1 island platform
- Tracks: 2

Other information
- Opened: September 10, 1932; 94 years ago
- Accessible: Partially; access to mezzanine only, platforms not accessible
Services
Preceding station	New York City Subway	Following station
Canal Street A C services split	A (New York City Subway service) C (New York City Subway service)	Fulton Street A C via Hoyt–Schermerhorn Streets
Former services
Preceding station	New York City Subway	Following station
West Fourth Street–Washington Square toward 21st Street–Queensbridge	JFK Express	Broadway–Nassau Street toward Howard Beach–JFK Airport
Station service legend
Symbol	Description
Stops all times except late nights	Stops all times except late nights
Stops all times	Stops all times

The Chambers Street station serves through trains, which travel to and from Brooklyn. Just north of Chambers Street is a third track between the uptown and downtown express tracks, with connecting switches at both ends, which was used to turn trains when Chambers Street was used as a terminal, before the Broadway–Nassau Street (now Fulton Street) station opened on February 1, 1933. It is served by the A and C trains. Although this platform is not wheelchair-accessible, it is one block away from the Chambers Street station on the IRT Broadway–Seventh Avenue Line, which is wheelchair-accessible.

=== World Trade Center ===
World Trade Center
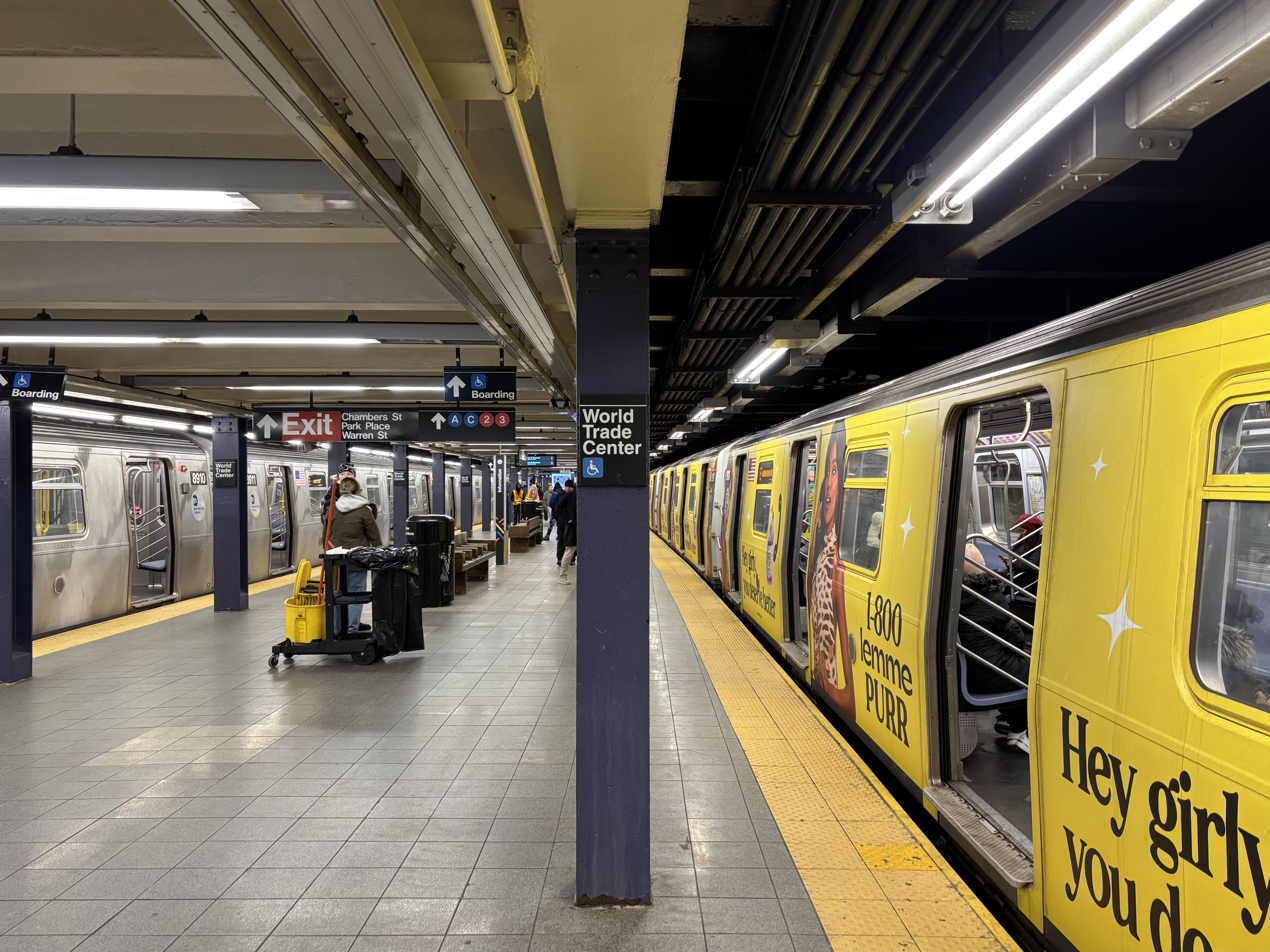
- R160 E trains stopped at the platform

Station statistics
- Address: Church Street between Chambers Street & Vesey Street; New York, New York
- Borough: Manhattan
- Locale: Financial District
- Division: B (IND)
- Line: IND Eighth Avenue Line
- Services: E (all times)
- Platforms: 1 island platform
- Tracks: 2

Other information
- Opened: September 10, 1932; 94 years ago
- Accessible: Yes
- Former/other names: Hudson Terminal
Services
Preceding station	New York City Subway	Following station
Canal Street toward Jamaica Center–York College	Local	Terminus
Station service legend
Symbol	Description
Stops all times	Stops all times

The terminating platform is named the World Trade Center station. It is served by the E train. Southbound local trains reach the platform by ramping underneath the express tracks south of Canal Street station. The northern end of the World Trade Center station has a signal tower and a diamond crossover switch that are roughly at the middle of the through-platform.

The local tracks end at bumper blocks at the south end of the platform. In addition, there is a platform-level passageway on the western side of the station toward the platform's south end, evidence of a former half-length side platform for the western track; while in passenger use as a connection to the rest of the station, the former platform is now fenced off from the rest of the local platform level, and passengers must now use the mezzanine to access the island platform. A connection to the World Trade Center Transportation Hub is also available at the station's south end; this, in turn, gives access to the Fulton Center (via the Dey Street Passageway), the Cortlandt Street station of the BMT Broadway Line, and the WTC Cortlandt Street station on the IRT Broadway–Seventh Avenue Line. Another passageway also leads directly to the southbound BMT Broadway Line platform.

The station was originally named Hudson Terminal or H&M, after the nearby Hudson Terminal of the Hudson and Manhattan Railroad (now the PATH). The IND had planned for a passageway between its Chambers Street–Hudson Terminal stations and the H&M's terminal in the original plan for the Eighth Avenue Line, but construction on the passageway did not begin until 1947. The direct passageway to Hudson Terminal opened in 1949. When the first World Trade Center was completed on Hudson Terminal's site in 1973, the IND station was renamed. Wall tiles reading "H AND M" remained on the walls of the World Trade Center station as late as December 1974, a year after the first World Trade Center was completed. The tiles were initially painted over, but since the station's renovation, they have been covered over.

==== Accessibility ====
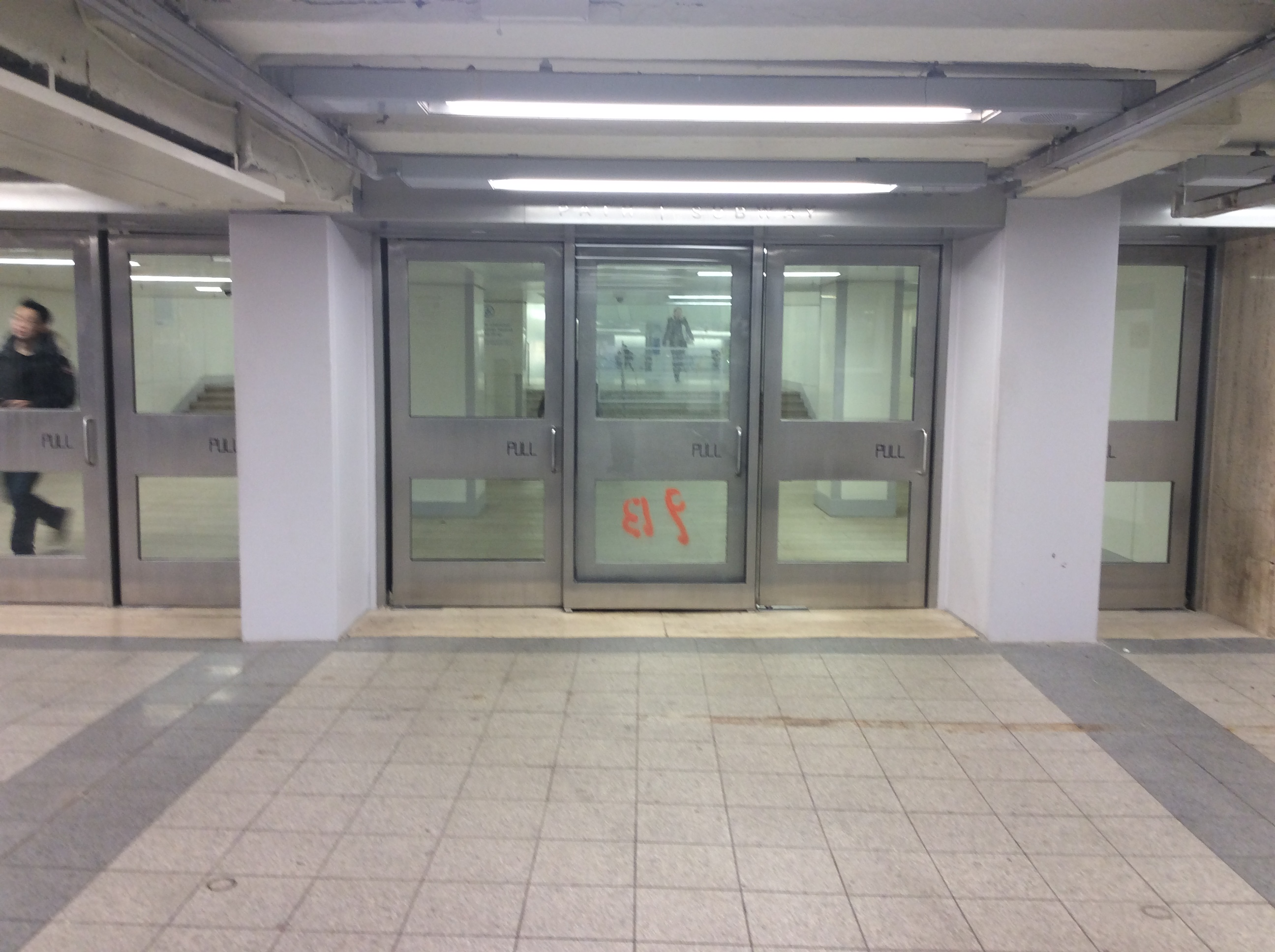
Doorway to PATH station, including preserved door from 9/11 with the words "MATF 1 / 9 13" spray-painted on it

At the extreme southern end of the station is the exit to the Cortlandt Street station, along with a few High Entrance-Exit Turnstiles (HEETs). Only this platform is ADA-accessible via a ramp installed in 1987, making the station one of the earliest in the New York City Subway system to be accessible to disabled users.

The doors and original ADA-accessible ramp, as well as the structure from the first World Trade Center leading into the station, survived the September 11 attacks. The station itself was not damaged, but it was covered by dust and was subsequently closed. The passageway reopened for a while to provide an ADA-connection from the New York City Subway station to the temporary World Trade Center PATH station, but was closed again when the temporary PATH station closed for a reconstruction. The passageway was then covered in plywood for preservation purposes.

The renovated entrance, leading from the New York City Subway station to the newly rebuilt PATH station's Oculus headhouse as well as to the Westfield World Trade Center, opened on December 19, 2016. The newly reopened passageway retained its pre-9/11 design, save for a door on display that has the words "MATF 1 / 9 13" spray-painted on it (a message from Urban Search and Rescue Massachusetts Task Force 1 of Beverly, Massachusetts, who searched the World Trade Center site on September 13, 2001). There is a plaque above the spray-painting, explaining the message on the door. PATH was required to preserve the passageway's original design as per Section 106 of the National Historic Preservation Act, as a condition for getting funding to construct the Oculus and new stations. The passageway was not made ADA-accessible again until 2017, as there are twenty-six steps down from the mezzanine to the Oculus headhouse's lobby. The original ADA ramp from 1987 is preserved, but not in use as past it are stairs that lead into the Oculus Hub.

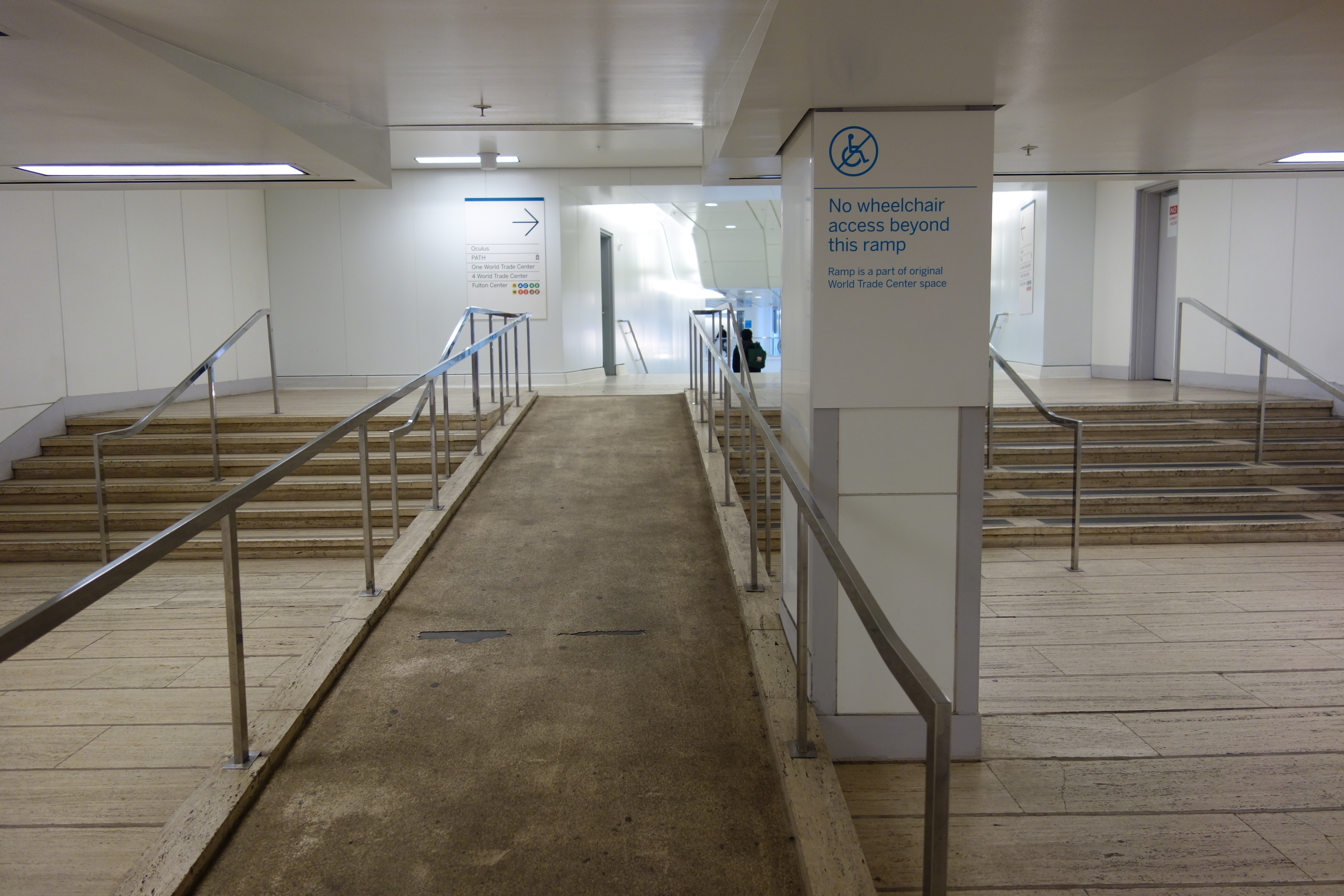
Preserved steps and ADA ramp along with sign noting that the area has no wheelchair access as the area is a preserved remnant of the original WTC site.

The MTA's elevator to the local platform, at the southeast corner of Church Street and Park Place, connects to the local platform via a long ramp from the main mezzanine shared with Chambers Street, but it was out of service between 2001 and 2018 due to long-term construction on the current World Trade Center.

=== Presentation on maps ===
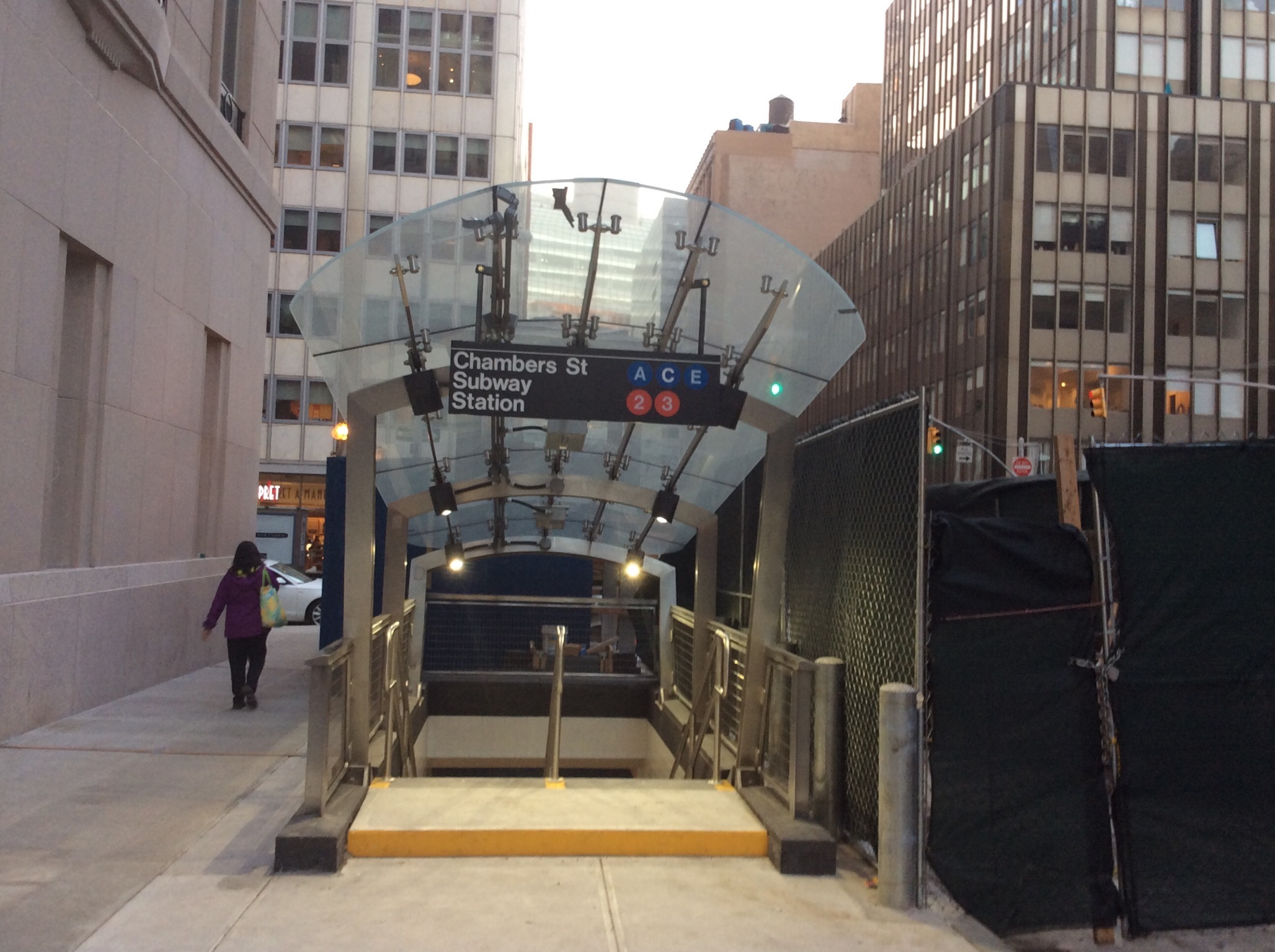
A new entrance at Church Street and Park Place

The station has been portrayed in a variety of ways on New York City Subway maps since 1932. Originally, it was shown as a single station called Chambers Street–Hudson Terminal. Starting in about 1948, two stations were shown, Chambers Street–Hudson Terminal for the express trains continuing to Brooklyn, and Hudson Terminal for the local trains terminating at the station. A 1959 map showed two stations enclosed in a box, but a single label. The 1964 and 1966 maps were similar.

On the 1972 map, it once again appeared to be a single station, with the label showing Chambers Street, Hudson Terminal, World Trade Center, and PATH, although the Hudson Terminal office building complex had already been demolished by this time.

On the current map published by the Metropolitan Transportation Authority, it is shown as two separate stations with a free transfer—Chambers Street (served by the A and C trains) and World Trade Center (served by the E train). Signs in the Fulton Center only show the E when pointing toward the World Trade Center station, as the A, C, 2 and 3 trains serve both station complexes.

=== Oculus mosaics ===
There are over 300 mosaics dispersed throughout the IND and IRT stations, which are part of the 1998 installation Oculus created by Kristin Jones and Andrew Ginzel. These eyes were modeled on photographs of the eyes of hundreds of New Yorkers.

According to Jones and Ginzel,

Oculus is a constellation of stone and glass mosaics in the underground labyrinth of interconnected subway stations of lower Manhattan. Over three hundred mosaic eyes, drawn from a photographic study of more than twelve hundred young New Yorkers, are set into the white tile walls of the World Trade Center/Park Place/Chamber Street Stations. The work's centerpiece is a large exquisitely detailed, elliptical glass and stone mosaic floor (38 ft 8 in x 20'8") at the heart of the Park Place Station. The continents of the earth, interwoven with the City of New York amidst an ultramarine pool, surround a large eye in the middle of the mosaic. The mosaic is at once a vision of the world, a reflecting pool of water and a representation New York City in its proper geographical orientation.

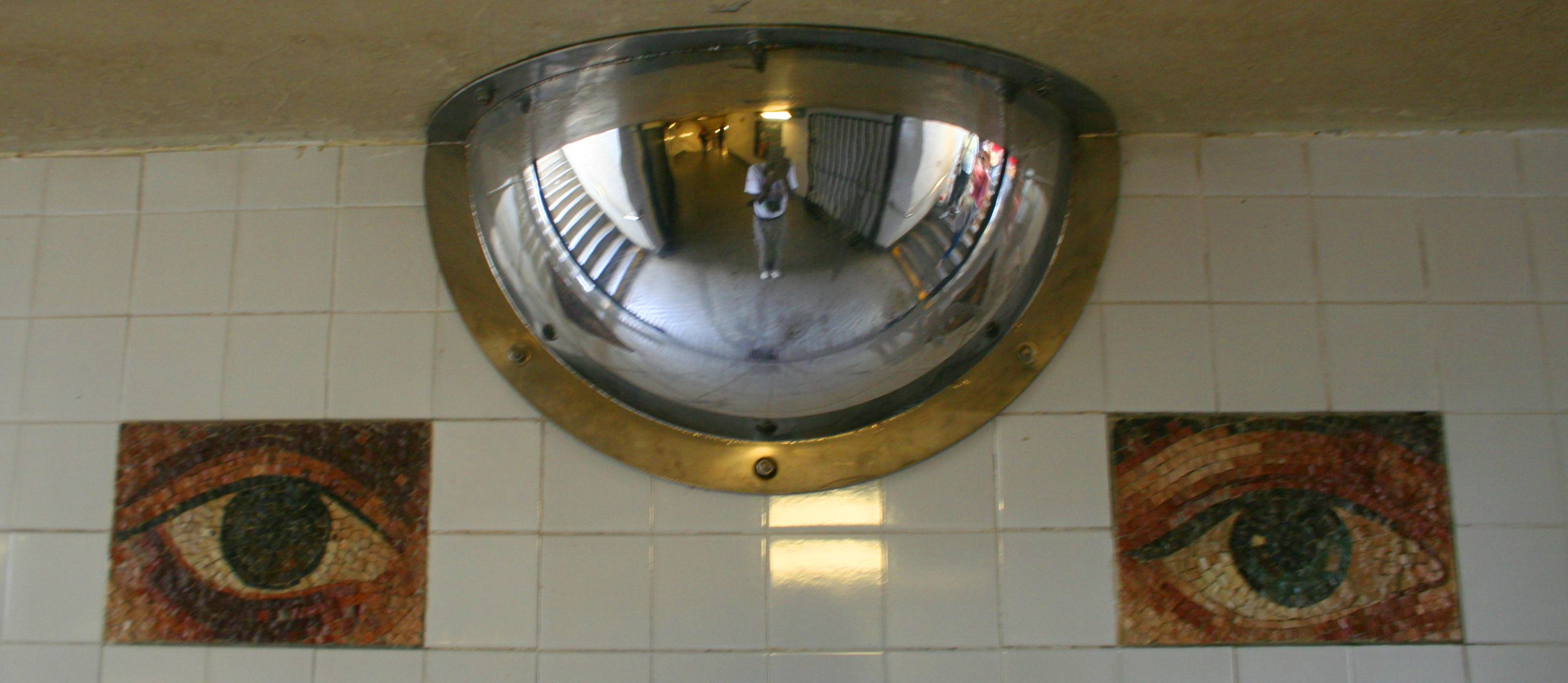
The eyes of "Oculus"

The work's detailed renderings of the eye–the most telling, fragile and vulnerable human feature–offer a profound sense of intimacy within a public place. Together, the images create a sense of unity and flow: animating, orienting and humanizing the station. Oculus invites a dialogue between the site and those who move through it.

Oculus was realized in collaboration with the Roman mosaicist, Rinaldo Piras, Sectile.

== IRT Broadway–Seventh Avenue Line platform ==
Park Place
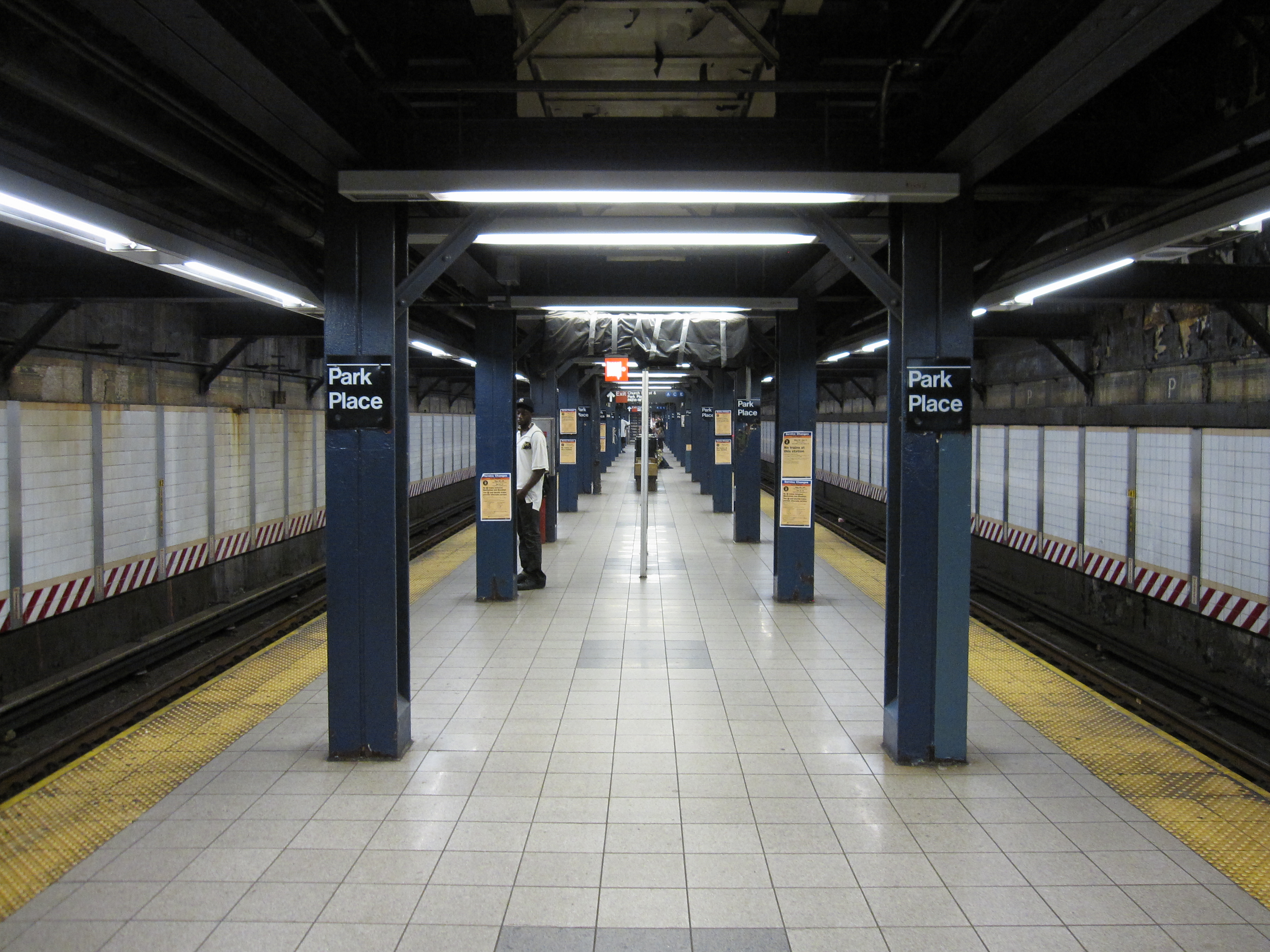
- Station platform

Station statistics
- Address: Park Place & Broadway; New York, New York
- Borough: Manhattan
- Locale: Financial District
- Division: A (IRT)
- Line: IRT Broadway–Seventh Avenue Line
- Services: 2 (all times); 3 (all except late nights)
- Platforms: 1 island platform
- Tracks: 2

Other information
- Opened: July 1, 1918; 108 years ago
- Accessible: Partially; access to mezzanine only, platforms not accessible
Services
Preceding station	New York City Subway	Following station
Chambers Street 2 3 via 135th Street	2 (New York City Subway service) 3 (New York City Subway service)	Fulton Street 2 3 via Franklin Avenue–Medgar Evers College
Track layout
Station service legend
Symbol	Description
Stops all times except late nights	Stops all times except late nights
Stops all times	Stops all times
Stops weekdays during the day	Stops weekdays during the day
Stops weekdays and weekday late nights	Stops weekdays and weekday late nights

The Park Place station on the IRT Broadway–Seventh Avenue Line was built on the portion of the line built as part of the Dual Contracts, which is the section south of Times Square–42nd Street. It has two tracks and a single island platform with a line of blue i-beam columns with alternating ones having the standard black name plate in white lettering. Both track walls have a mostly gold trim line along with the "P" tablets at regular intervals. Fixed platform barriers, which are intended to prevent commuters falling to the tracks, are positioned near the platform edges.

Northwest (railroad north) of the station, the tracks of this station become the express tracks of the IRT Broadway–Seventh Avenue Line, curving sharply northeast under West Broadway. The station is very close to the next stop north, Chambers Street at West Broadway, and the northernmost entrances of this station at Church and Chambers Streets are less than 400 feet (120 m) from the entrances to the station at Chambers Street and West Broadway.

Between April 3 and October 1, 1999, the Park Place station was closed for a rehabilitation that involved replacing escalators.

The station has a mezzanine at each end. Towards the western end of the platform, two long staircases lead up to an intermediate landing where another, shorter staircase leads up to the main IND mezzanine near the full Oculus mosaic. From here, there is a bank of turnstiles leading to the street stair at the northwest corner of Park Place and Church Street. A staircase in this mezzanine leads down to the extreme southern end of the IND express platform, where another set of stairs can be used to transfer to the local platform.

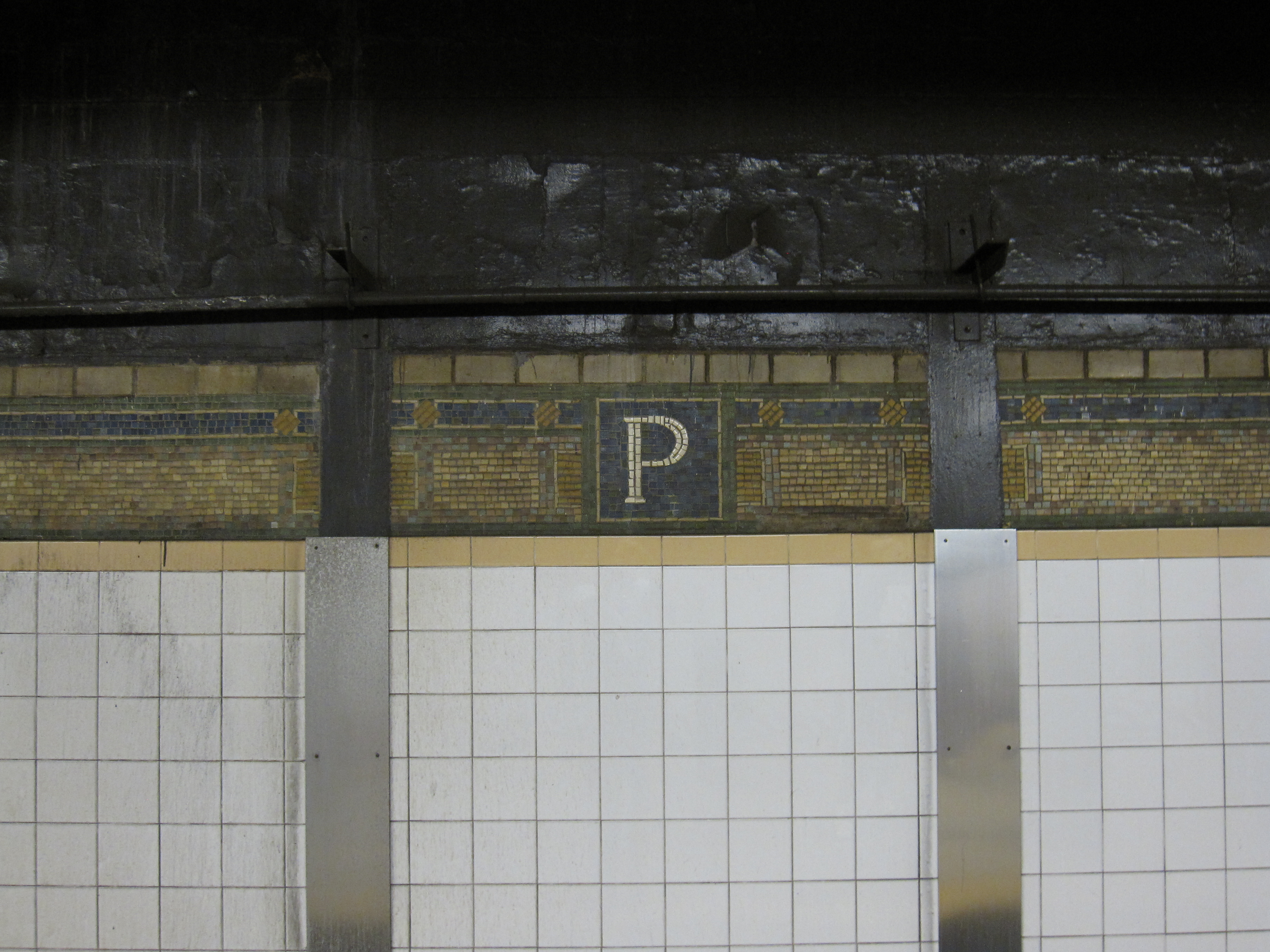
Track wall mosaic

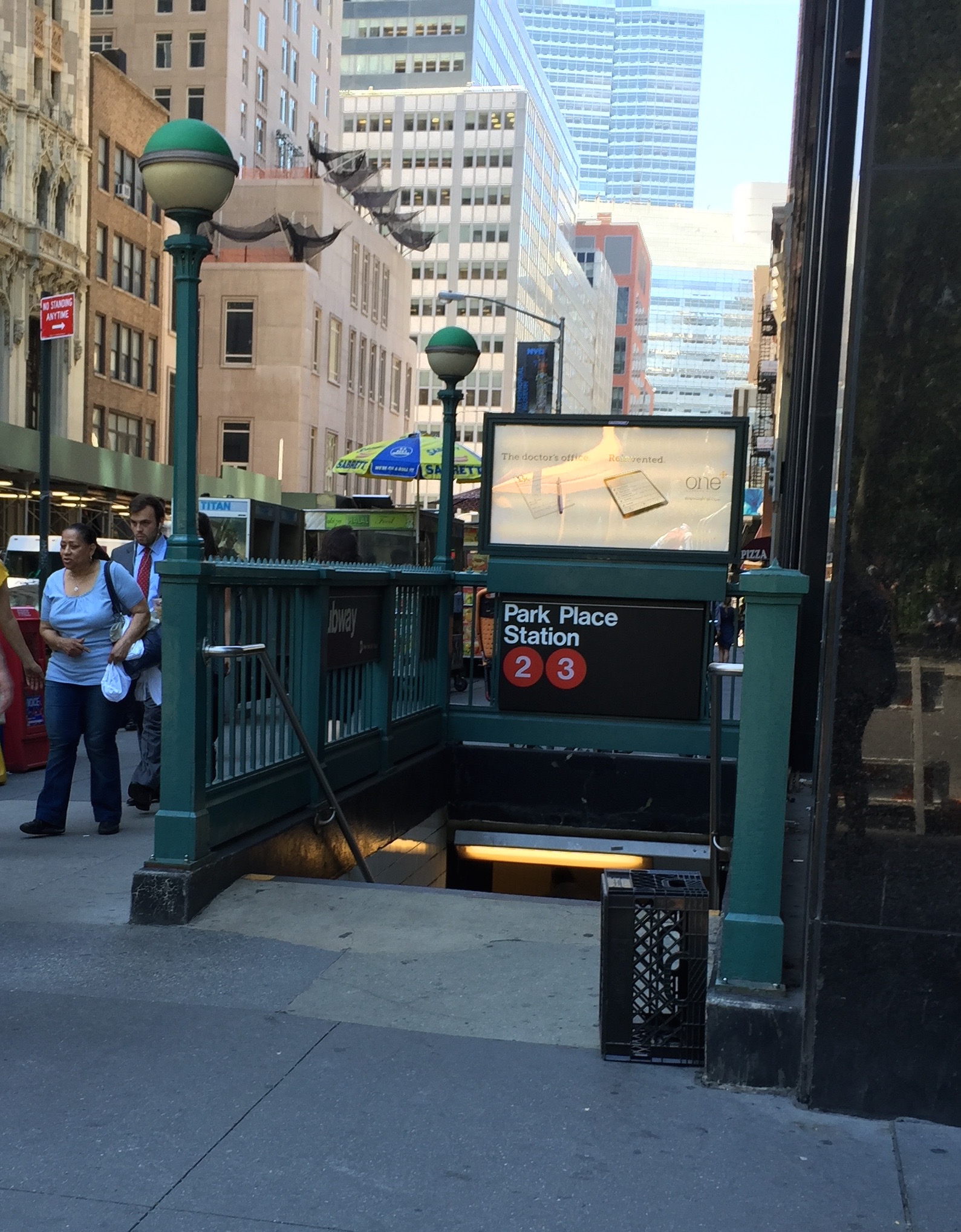
Entrance at Park Place & Broadway

== BMT Broadway Line platforms ==
Cortlandt Street
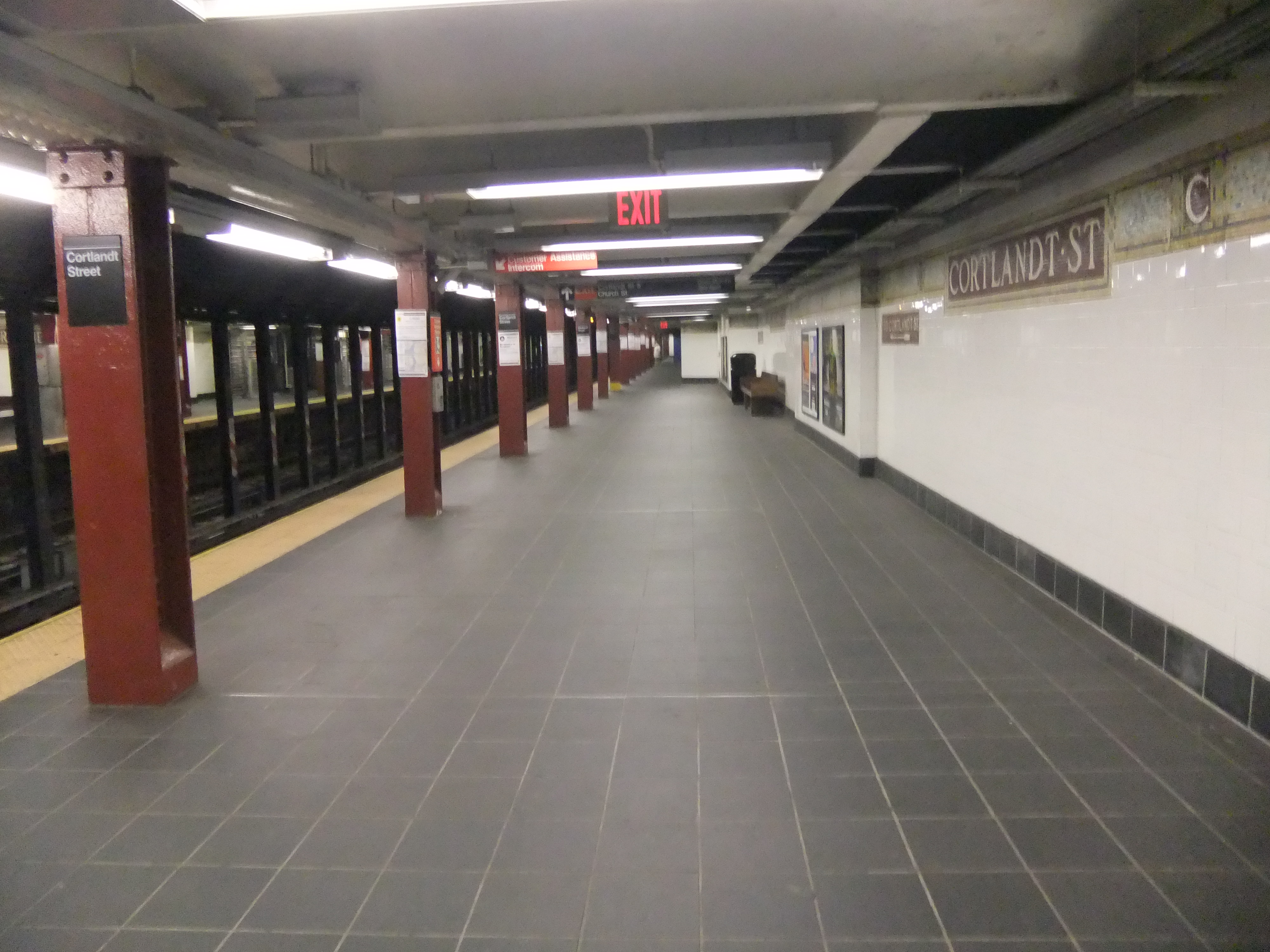
- Downtown platform

Station statistics
- Address: Cortlandt Street & Church Street; New York, New York
- Borough: Manhattan
- Locale: Financial District, World Trade Center
- Division: B (BMT)
- Line: BMT Broadway Line
- Services: N (late nights); R (all except late nights); W (weekdays only)
- Structure: Underground
- Platforms: 2 side platforms
- Tracks: 2

Other information
- Opened: January 5, 1918; 108 years ago (original); September 15, 2002; 24 years ago (first reopening)
- Closed: September 11, 2001; 25 years ago (first closing); August 20, 2005; 21 years ago (second closing)
- Rebuilt: November 25, 2009; 16 years ago (northbound platform); September 6, 2011; 15 years ago (southbound platform)
- Accessible: Yes
- Former/other names: Cortlandt Street–World Trade Center
Services
Preceding station	New York City Subway	Following station
City Hall N R W via Lexington Avenue–59th Street	R (New York City Subway service) W (New York City Subway service)	Rector Street N R W via Whitehall Street–South Ferry
Track layout
Station service legend
Symbol	Description
Stops all times except late nights	Stops all times except late nights
Stops weekdays during the day	Stops weekdays during the day
Stops late nights only	Stops late nights only

The Cortlandt Street station is a local station on the BMT Broadway Line. The station is located under Church Street, between Fulton and Cortlandt Streets. It has two tracks and two side platforms. It is the closest station on the BMT Broadway Line to the World Trade Center. Immediately north of this station, the line utilizes a sharp reverse curve, first turning east under Vesey Street, then turning north under Broadway toward City Hall.

Passageways link this station to three others outside fare control: the World Trade Center PATH station, the WTC Cortlandt station, and the Fulton Street station, all through the Dey Street Passageway underneath the station. The station also contains a free transfer to the Chambers Street–World Trade Center and Park Place stations via the southbound platform.

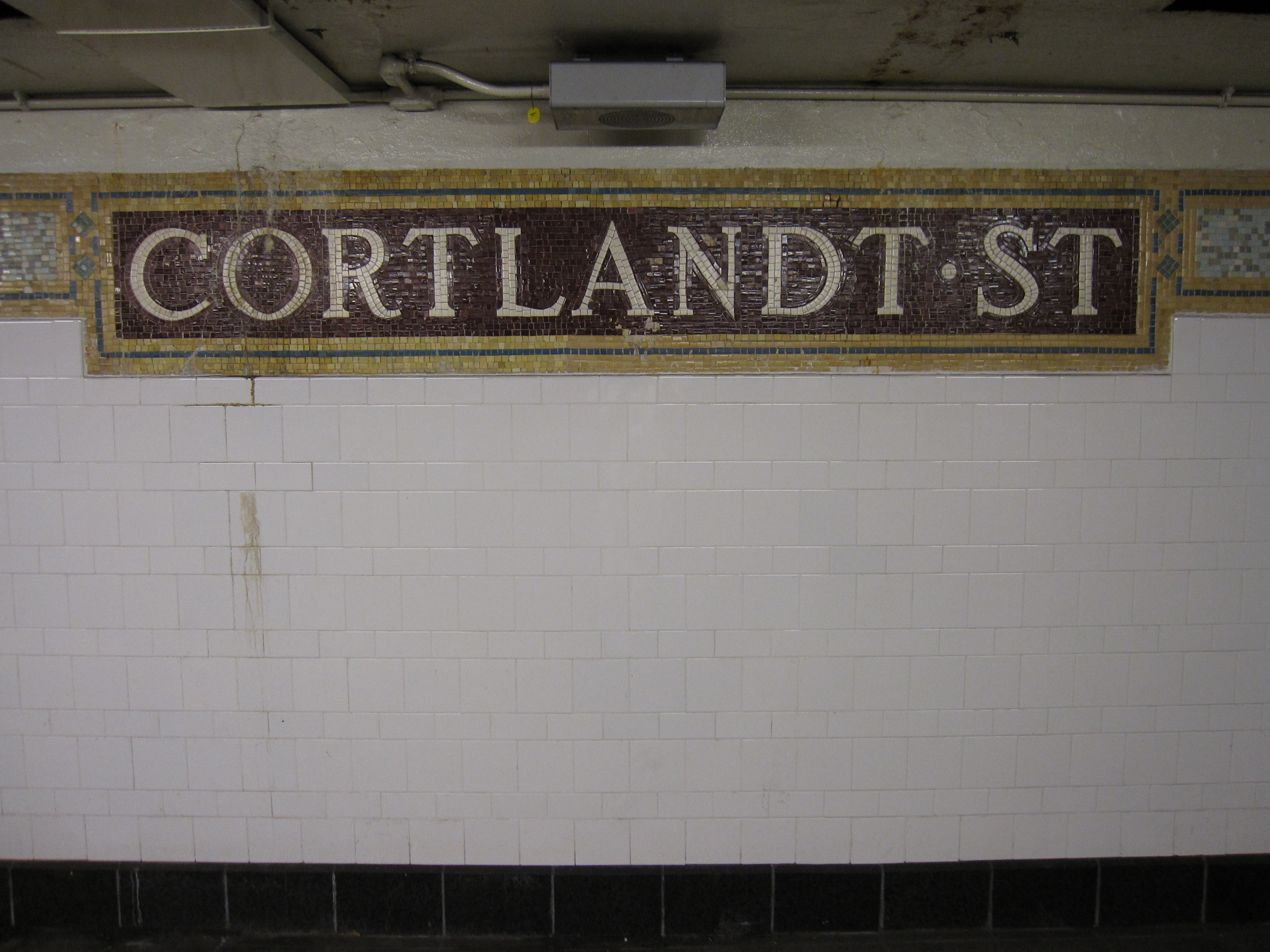
Name tablet mosaic

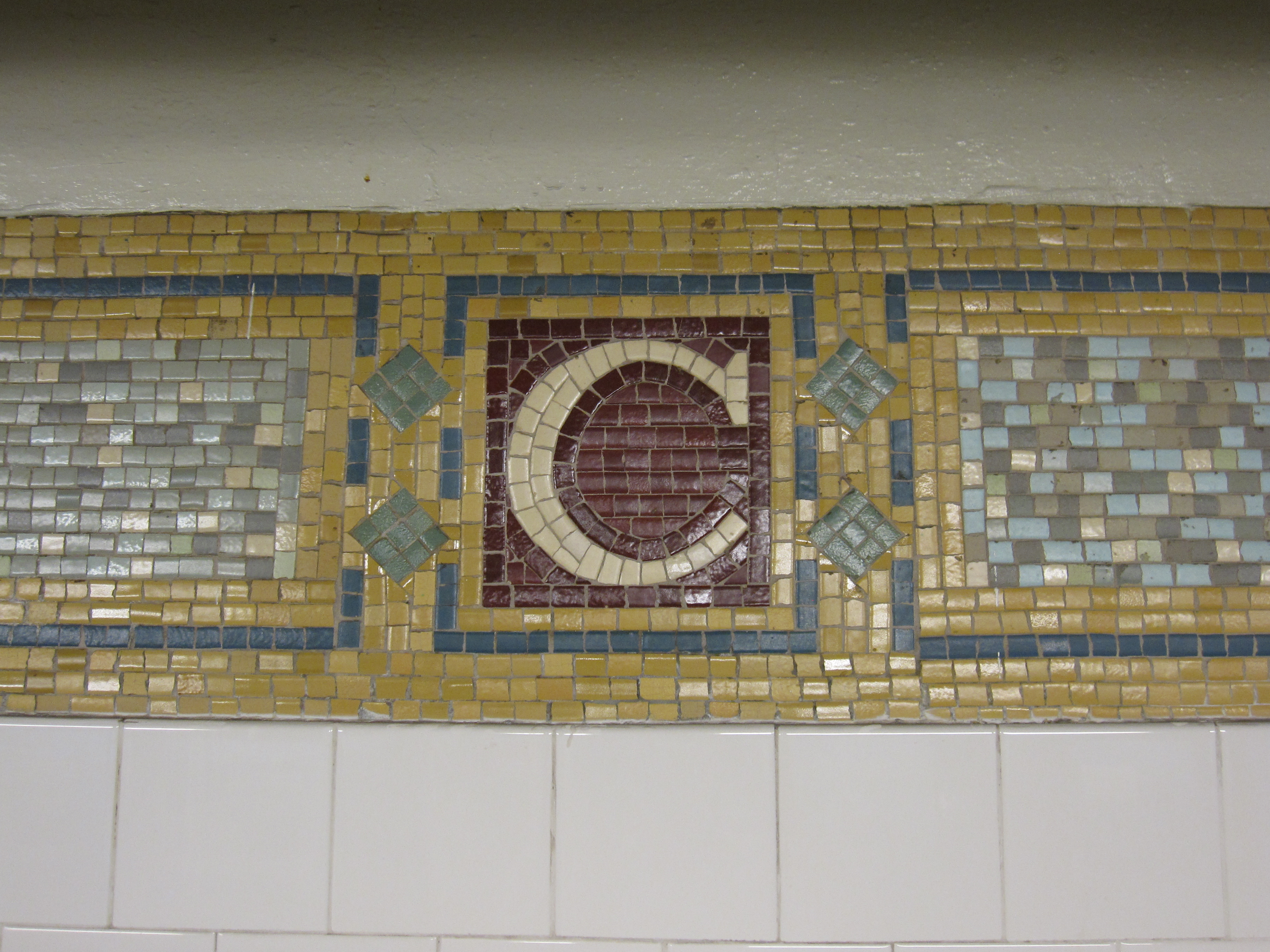
Monogram mosaic

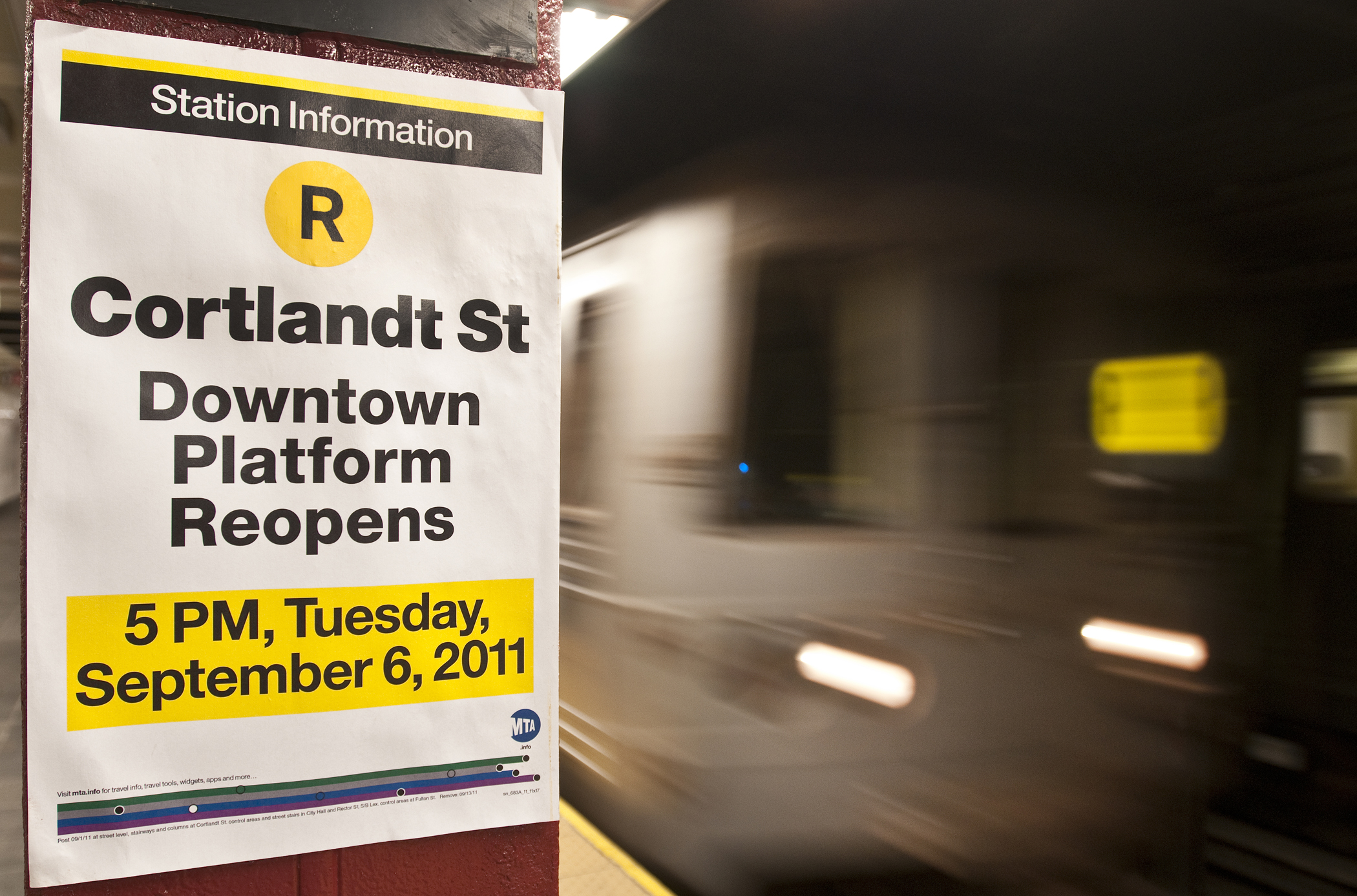
Poster announcing opening of the southbound platform

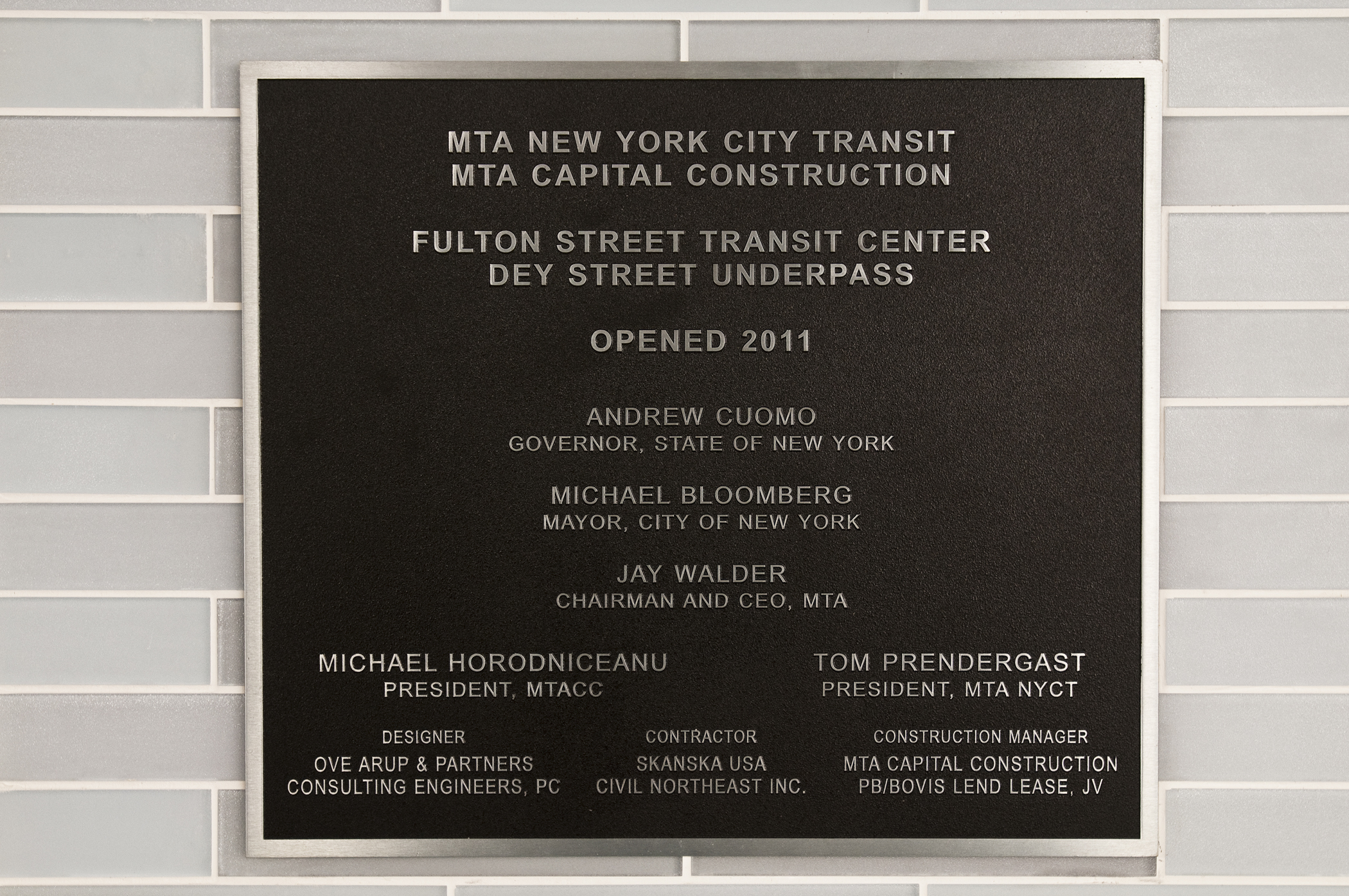
Plaque on the Dey Street Underpass

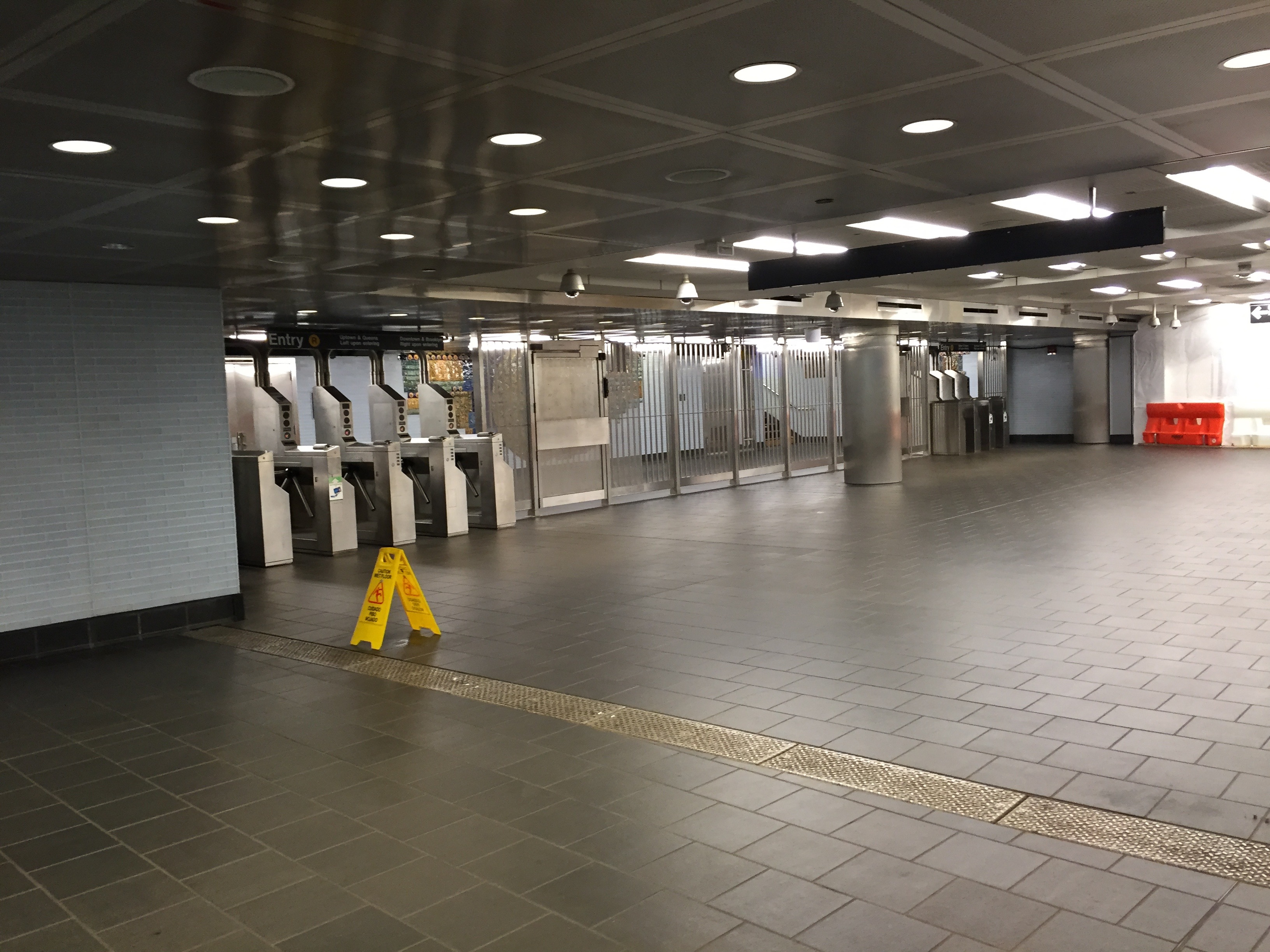
Dey Street Passageway entrance

Fulton St to Cortlandt St subway cross-section
Greenwich St	WTC Transportation; Hub (Oculus) / Westfield Shops	Church St		Broadway	Fulton; Center / Westfield; Shops		Nassau St		William St
1	WTC Transportation; Hub (Oculus) / Westfield Shops	R / W		4 / 5	Fulton; Center / Westfield; Shops		J / Z south		mezzanine
underpass	WTC Transportation; Hub (Oculus) / Westfield Shops	underpass	Dey Street Passageway	underpass	Fulton; Center / Westfield; Shops	mezzanine	J / Z north	mezzanine	2 / 3
mezzanine	WTC Transportation; Hub (Oculus) / Westfield Shops				← A / C →
PATH

== Nearby points of interest ==
- Brookfield Place (formerly World Financial Center)
- Battery Park City
- Stuyvesant High School
- Century 21 (also near the adjacent Fulton Street station)
- Church Street Post Office
- New York Public Library New Amsterdam Branch
- Saks Fifth Avenue Downtown division
- St. Paul's Chapel
- Woolworth Building
- World Trade Center buildings (see also World Trade Center site)
