= Air traffic control during the September 11 attacks =

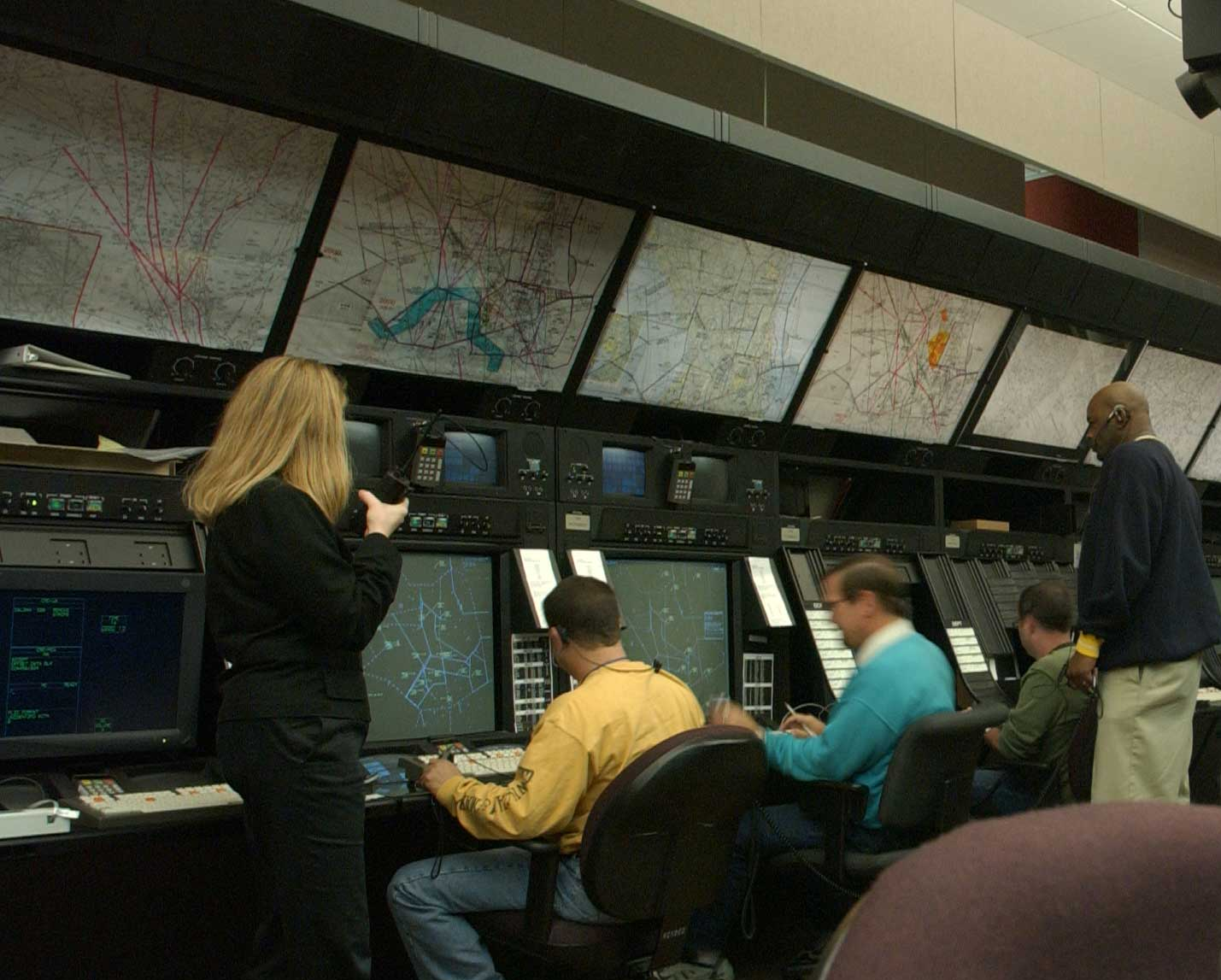
Air traffic controllers at the Washington Air Traffic Control Center

Air traffic control played a major role in maintaining order and grounding flights during the September 11 attacks. Controllers made contact with all four hijacked aircraft prior to the attacks, and two made contact with the hijackers themselves.

== Communications with hijacked flights ==
=== American Airlines Flight 11 ===
A Boston TRACON air traffic controller communicated with American Airlines Flight 11 until 08:13, when the last known contact with the aircraft was made prior to it being hijacked. The controller told the flight to "climb, maintain flight level three five zero" two times, although it never complied with the order. The Boston Center later made contact with the Cleveland Center, noting that "We don’t know where the aircraft is goin' ..." and that the plane was at an unknown altitude.

At 08:24, a Federal Aviation Administration (FAA) controller in Boston heard Mohamed Atta, a hijacker of the plane, say "We have some planes." By 08:38, three Northeast Air Defense Sector identification technicians were communicating with a military operations specialist at the FAA in Boston. The group was trying to figure out where the plane was going. At 08:46, Flight 11 crashed into the North Tower. Around 09:06, the FAA confirmed that Atta had said "planes" instead of "plane". At 09:11, a FAA Operations Manager was told by an American Airlines dispatcher that Flight 11 was hijacked.

=== United Airlines Flight 175 ===
A New York Center controller who had worked the airspace that American Airlines Flight 11 was in briefly made contact with Flight 175 prior to its hijacking. At 08:42, the crew of Flight 175 made a report that a "suspicious transmission" had come from another aircraft on their frequency; the transmission was later attributed to the hijackers of Flight 11. This transmission was the last verifiable contact the flight had with ground control before it was hijacked a few moments later.

New York Center and New York TRACON operators reacting to United Airlines Flight 175 impacting the South Tower of the World Trade Center

At 08:51, Flight 175 was told by the New York Center to recycle its transponder; it never complied. At this point in the flight, air traffic controllers were repeatedly attempting to make contact with the aircraft, but the flight had been hijacked by then. At 09:02, controllers observed the plane crash into the South Tower over the next minute.

=== American Airlines Flight 77 ===
The air traffic controllers in Indianapolis received their last routine communication from American Airlines Flight 77 at 08:51; the aircraft pulled its transponder and deviated from its path 3 minutes later. By 09:10, Flight 77 appeared on Washington D.C's radar. At 09:32, air traffic controllers at the Dulles Terminal Radar Approach Control saw Flight 77 quickly moving eastward. At 09:37, Flight 77 crashed into the Pentagon at a speed of around 530 miles per hour. Everyone in the aircraft and 125 people in the building were killed.

=== United Airlines Flight 93 ===
At 09:28, the last transmission to United Airlines Flight 93 was made with a Cleveland air traffic controller, in which a struggle was recorded. At 09:41, the transponder signal was lost and the aircraft turned towards Washington, D.C. The Cleveland Center tracked the plane until it crashed in Shanksville, Pennsylvania, after the passengers had attempted to retake the aircraft.

== Grounding and diverting flights following the nationwide grounding order ==
Mike McCormick, head of the Federal Aviation Administration's New York Center at the time, was informed of the hijackers on American Airlines Flight 11 at 08:42. McCormick originally thought that the plane was going for a landing in Newark airport. After reaching a controller in Newark, McCormick instructed the controller to look to see if the plane was landing. The controller then informed McCormick that the plane hit the North Tower. In an interview, McCormick stated that in that moment he recalled the 1993 World Trade Center bombing and then realized that the plane crashing into the North Tower was an act of terrorism. With this realization, McCormick told the coordinator of air traffic control and military operations "to scramble. Get ahold of northeast air defense and scramble."

The FAA ordered a ground stop for any planes not in the sky that would have entered New York's airspace; it soon shut down all of the airspace in the United States. While every airport in the United States was closed for a few days, the Reagan National Airport was closed for almost a month. Over 4,000 planes were grounded.

A single exception to the grounding order came on September 12, when a flight was authorized from Fort Lauderdale, to San Diego, and on to Miami to retrieve a rare antivenom for a professional snake handler who had been bitten by an inland taipan.

== Aftermath ==
In 2011, the FAA released a video commending the efforts of the air traffic controllers during 9/11.

The Federal Aviation Administration destroyed a tape of statements by the New York air traffic controllers after the September 11 attacks. On September 11, 2001, at 11:40, six air traffic controllers were brought into a conference room after tracking down the hijacked planes to give statements. All of the statements were combined into a single videotape, which was to be deleted after each video statement was turned into written ones. A few months after the tape was made, a quality-assurance manager destroyed the tape without direction. The quality-assurance manager stated they felt strongly that the tape shouldn't have been made due to the air traffic controllers not being “in the correct frame of mind”. The Department of Transportation issued a report after then-Senator John McCain alleged that an audiotape was destroyed.

== See also ==
- Communication during the September 11 attacks
