= Chambers Street station (IRT Broadway–Seventh Avenue Line) =

New York City Subway station in Manhattan

Chambers Street
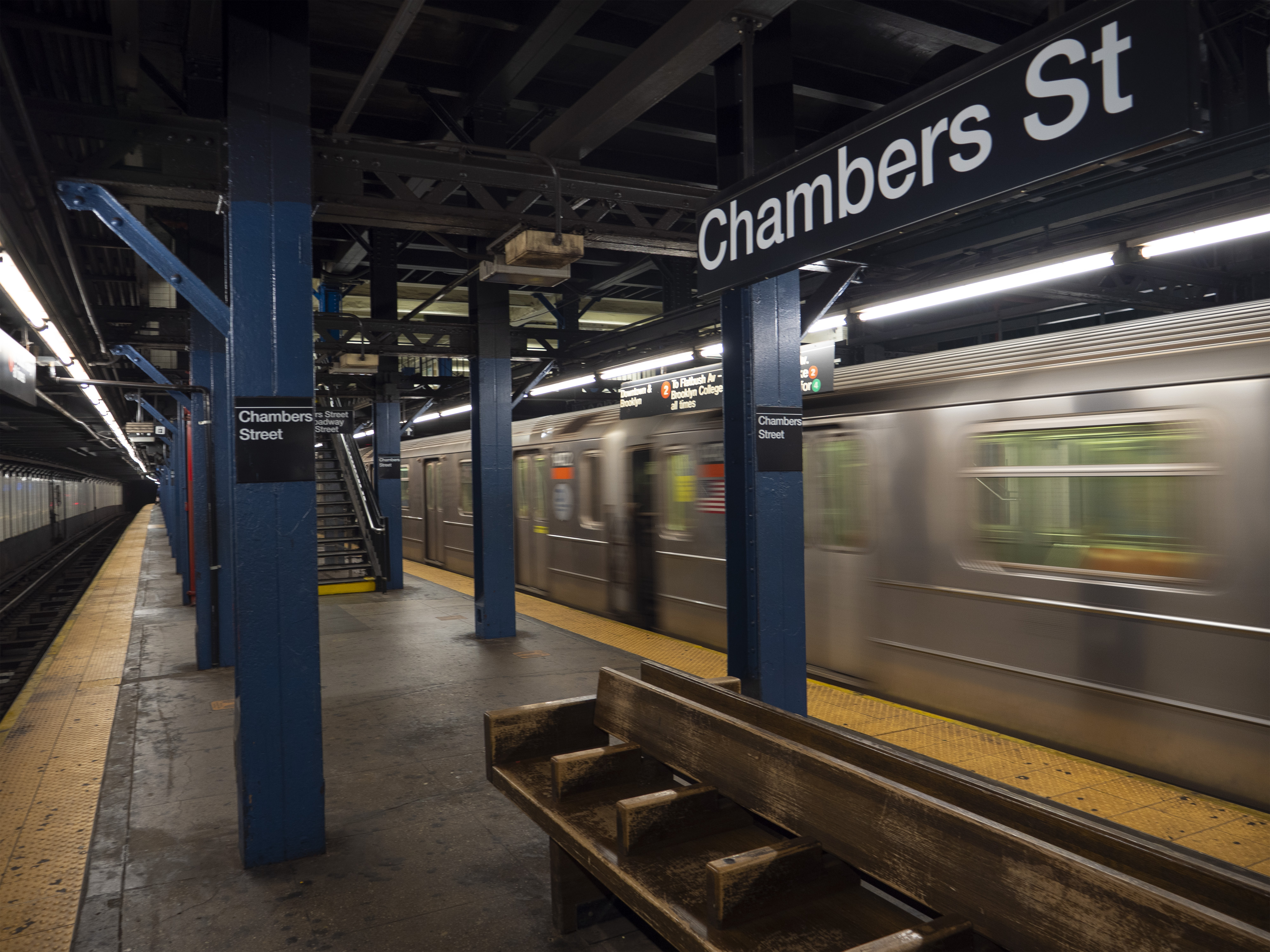
- Southbound R62 3 train departing

Station statistics
- Address: Chambers Street & West Broadway; New York, New York
- Borough: Manhattan
- Locale: Financial District, Tribeca
- Coordinates: 40.715517°N 74.009233°W
- Division: A (IRT)
- Line: IRT Broadway–Seventh Avenue Line
- Services: 1 (all times); 2 (all times); 3 (all except late nights)
- Transit: NYCT Bus: M20, M22
- Structure: Underground
- Platforms: 2 island platforms cross-platform interchange
- Tracks: 4

Other information
- Opened: July 1, 1918; 108 years ago
- Accessible: Yes

Traffic
- 2025: 4,243,386 ▲7.7%
- Rank: 81 out of 423
Services
| Preceding station | New York City Subway | Following station |
|---|---|---|
| 14th Street 2 3 via 135th Street | Express | Park Place 2 3 via Franklin Avenue–Medgar Evers College |
| Franklin Street 1 2 toward Van Cortlandt Park–242nd Street | Local | WTC Cortlandt 1 toward South Ferry |
Location
Location within New York City Subway
Location within New York City
Location within New York
Track layout
Street map
Station service legend
| Symbol | Description |
| Stops all times except late nights | Stops all times except late nights |
| Stops all times | Stops all times |
| Stops late nights only | Stops late nights only |
| Stops weekdays and weekday late nights | Stops weekdays and weekday late nights |
| Stops weekdays during the day | Stops weekdays during the day |
| Stops weekends during the day | Stops weekends during the day |
- Chambers Street Subway Station (Dual System IRT)
- U.S. National Register of Historic Places
- New York State Register of Historic Places
- MPS: New York City Subway System MPS
- NRHP reference No.: 05000234
- NYSRHP No.: 06101.015034

Significant dates
- Added to NRHP: March 30, 2005
- Designated NYSRHP: December 11, 2004

The Chambers Street station is an express station on the IRT Broadway–Seventh Avenue Line of the New York City Subway, located at the intersection of Chambers Street and West Broadway in the TriBeCa and the Financial District neighborhoods of Manhattan, it is served by the 1 and 2 trains at all times, and by the 3 train at all times except late nights.

The station was built by the Interborough Rapid Transit Company (IRT) as part of the Dual Contracts with New York City, and opened on July 1, 1918. Its platforms were extended in the 1960s, and elevators were installed in the 2000s, making the station compliant with the Americans with Disabilities Act of 1990. The station was listed on the National Register of Historic Places in 2005.

== History ==
=== Construction and opening ===
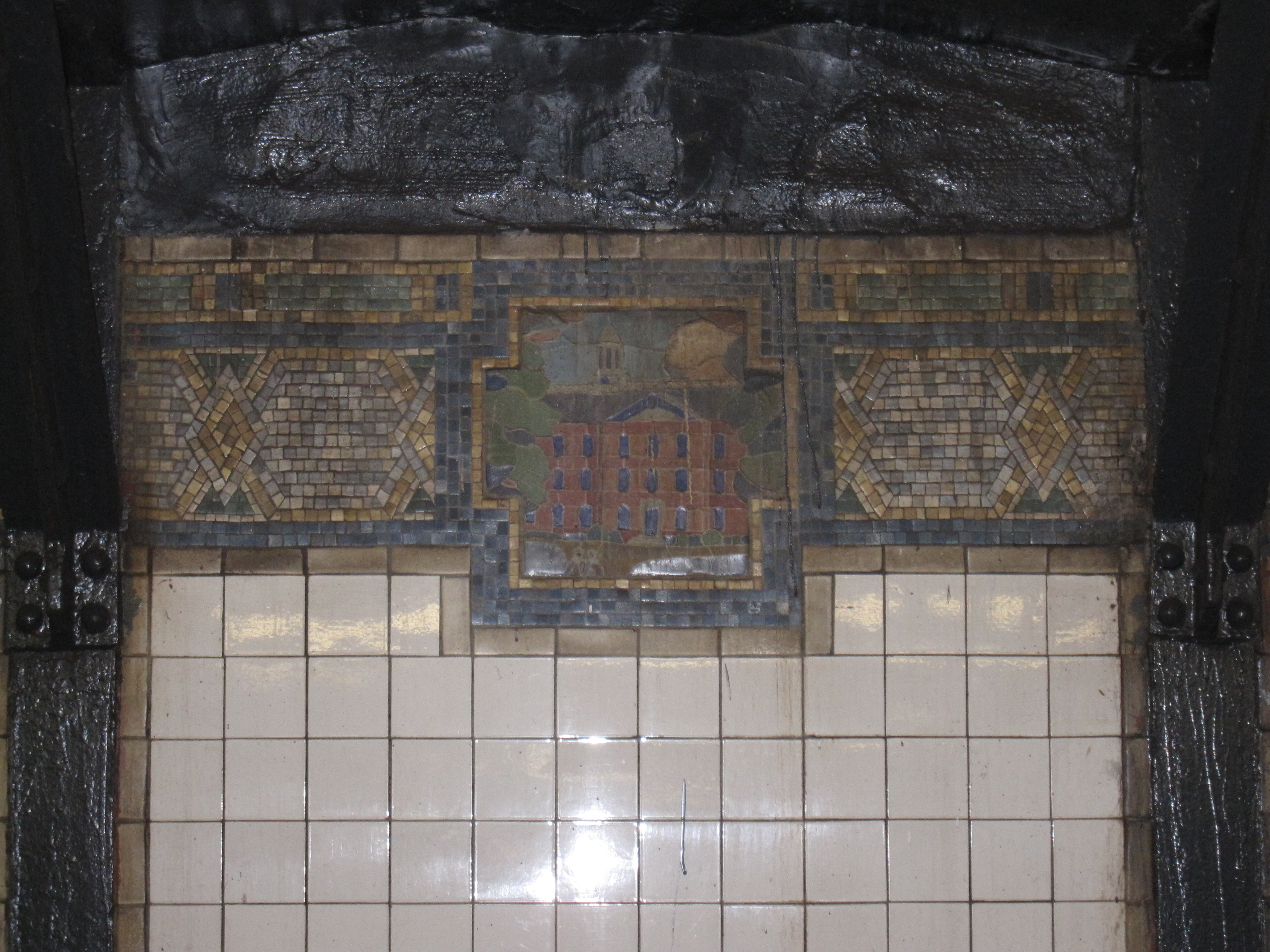
Plaque with the first building of Kings College (later Columbia University), which was located around the corner on Park Place

The Dual Contracts, which were signed on March 19, 1913, were contracts for the construction and/or rehabilitation and operation of rapid transit lines in the City of New York. The contracts were "dual" in that they were signed between the City and two separate private companies (the Interborough Rapid Transit Company and the Brooklyn Rapid Transit Company), all working together to make the construction of the Dual Contracts possible. The Dual Contracts promised the construction of several lines in Brooklyn. As part of Contract 4, the IRT agreed to build a branch of the original subway line south down Seventh Avenue, Varick Street, and West Broadway to serve the West Side of Manhattan.

The construction of this line, in conjunction with the construction of the Lexington Avenue Line, would change the operations of the IRT system. Instead of having trains go via Broadway, turning onto 42nd Street, before finally turning onto Park Avenue, there would be two trunk lines connected by the 42nd Street Shuttle. The system would be changed from looking like a "Z" system on a map to an "H" system. One trunk would run via the new Lexington Avenue Line down Park Avenue, and the other trunk would run via the new Seventh Avenue Line up Broadway. In order for the line to continue down Varick Street and West Broadway, these streets needed to be widened, and two new streets were built, the Seventh Avenue Extension and the Varick Street Extension. It was predicted that the subway extension would lead to the growth of the Lower West Side, and to neighborhoods such as Chelsea and Greenwich Village.

Chambers Street opened as part of an extension of the line from 34th Street–Penn Station to South Ferry on July 1, 1918. Initially, the station was served by a shuttle running from Times Square to South Ferry. The new "H" system was implemented on August 1, 1918, joining the two halves of the Broadway–Seventh Avenue Line and sending all West Side trains south from Times Square. An immediate result of the switch was the need to transfer using the 42nd Street Shuttle in order to retrace the original layout. The completion of the "H" system doubled the capacity of the IRT system.

=== Later years ===
The city government took over the IRT's operations on June 12, 1940. On August 9, 1964, the New York City Transit Authority (NYCTA) announced the letting of a $7.6 million contract to lengthen platforms at stations on the Broadway—Seventh Avenue Line from Rector Street to 34th Street–Penn Station, including Chambers Street, and stations from Central Park North–110th Street to 145th Street on the Lenox Avenue Line to allow express trains to be lengthened from nine-car trains to ten-car trains, and to lengthen locals from eight-car trains to ten-car trains. With the completion of this project, the NYCTA project to lengthen IRT stations to accommodate ten-car trains would be complete.

The station was renovated between 2007 and 2009. Three elevators were installed in the station (two from platform level to the mezzanine and one from fare control to the streets) to make it accessible for people with disabilities under the Americans with Disabilities Act of 1990. In October 2026, the MTA announced plans to install taller fare gates with glass panels at 20 additional stations, including the Chamnbers Street station, following a successful pilot program at earlier stations.

== Station layout ==
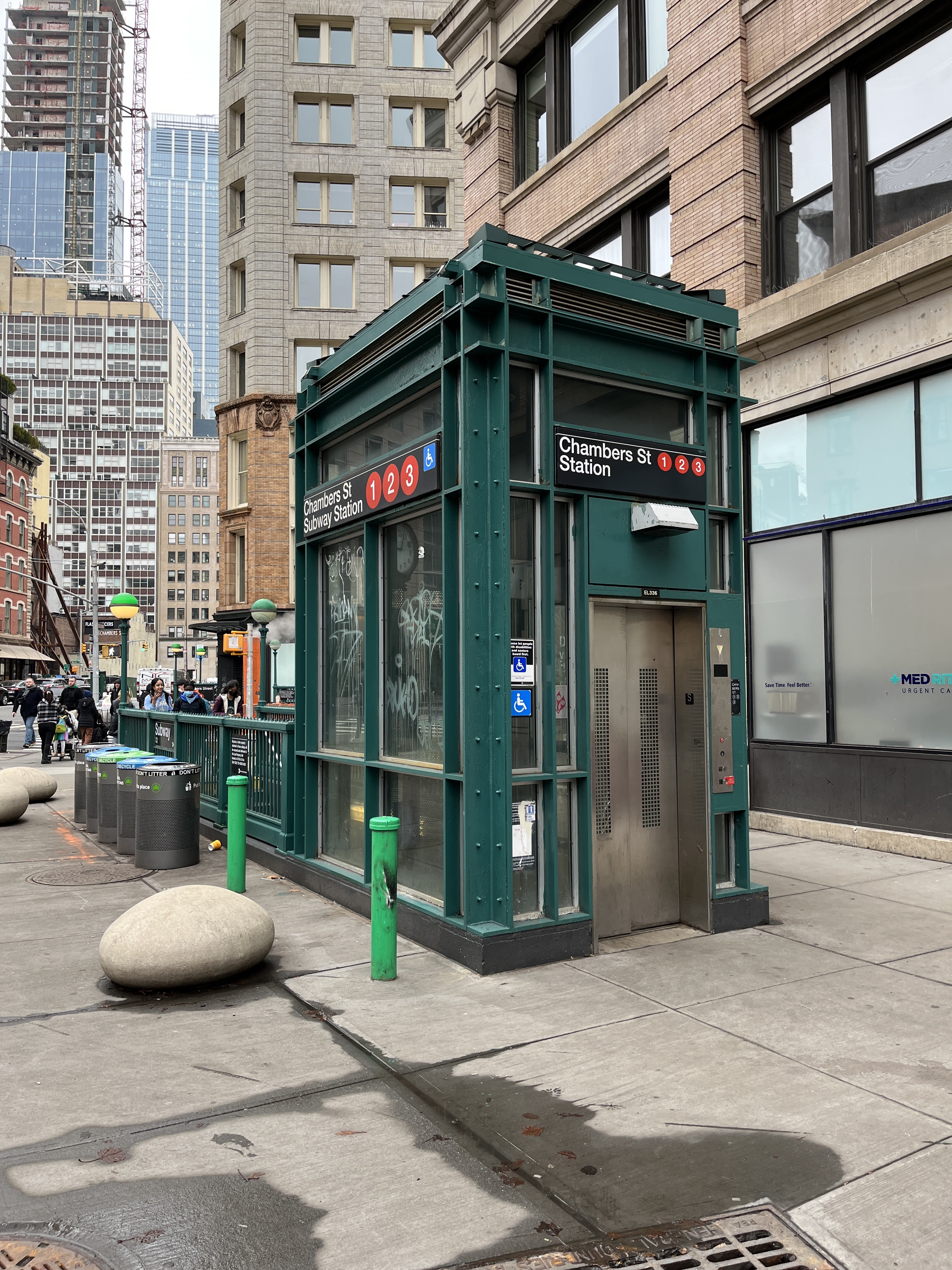
Exit and elevator kiosk at Chambers Street and West Broadway

This underground station has four tracks and two island platforms. The station is served by the 1 and 2 trains at all times and by the 3 train except at night. The 1 always runs on the outer local tracks and the 2 and 3 always run on the center express tracks. The next stop to the north is Franklin Street for local trains and 14th Street for express trains. The next stop to the south is WTC Cortlandt for 1 trains and Park Place for 2 and 3 trains. South of this station, the 2 and 3 trains curve sharply east and branch off to Park Place, Fulton Street, Wall Street, and then Brooklyn. The 1 train continues in a more direct southerly orientation towards its terminal, South Ferry. North of the station are diamond crossovers in both directions used by the 2 train during the night when it runs local in Manhattan, crossing to the local track from the express track northbound and reverse southbound.

The walls of the station contain mosaics depicting Columbia College's old campus nearby, between Murray, Church, and Barclay Streets and West Broadway.

=== Exits ===
The station's only exits are through the mezzanine above the center of the station. Street stairs lead to four of the five corners of the intersection of Chambers Street, Hudson Streets, and West Broadway. The only corner without a street stair is the wedge between Hudson Street and West Broadway on the intersection's northern side, where the James Bogardus Plaza is located. The southwest corner of the intersection has two stairs. There is an elevator located at the northwestern corner of Chambers and Hudson Streets.

== Nearby points of interest ==
- Brookfield Place
- World Trade Center
- Borough of Manhattan Community College
- Stuyvesant High School
- New York Law School

== See also ==
- National Register of Historic Places listings in Manhattan below 14th Street
