= Jovino =

Jovino is a given name and surname. Notable people with the name include:

== Given name ==
- Hilário Jovino Ferreira (1855–1933), known as the Lalau de Ouro, Brazilian composer and lyricist
- Jovino Flamarion (born 1996), known mononymously as Flamarion, Brazilian footballer
- Jovino González (born 1975), Spanish sprint canoeist
- Jovino Mendoza (born 1941), Paraguayan footballer
- Jovino Santos Neto (born 1954), Brazilian-American jazz pianist, flutist, composer, arranger, educator, and record producer
- Jovino Novoa (1945–2021), Chilean politician
- Jovino Parada (born 1930), Chilean farmer and politician
- Jovino dos Santos (fl. 1979–2011), Cape Verdean interpreter, composer, and actor
- Jovino Soares Viana Junior (born 1985), aka Juca Viana, Brazilian footballer
- Jovino Novoa Vidal (1822–1892), Chilean lawyer, diplomat, and politician

== Surname ==
- John Jovino (fl. 1910s), American gun shop owner
- Maria Bonghi Jovino (1931–2025), Italian archaeologist

== See also ==
- Jovine
