= Rose Tarlow =

American interior designer

- Born: Rose Khedouri
- Education: Emerson College (BS 1960), and the New York School of Interior Design
- Occupations: Interior Designer and Author
- Spouse: Barry Tarlow (m. 1971; div. 1980)

Rose Tarlow (née Khedouri) is an interior designer, furniture and textile designer, and author based in Los Angeles, California. She is known for having designed elegant residences for a small number of notable clients. She is the author of Private House, a memoir of her interior design activities, first published in 2001.

== Life ==
Tarlow graduated from Emerson College in 1960 with a Bachelor of Science in Theater Arts. She married in 1961, after which she attended classes at the New York School of Interior Design and the Parsons School of Design, and established an interior design shop in Englewood, New Jersey. In 1971, having divorced and moved to California, she married the lawyer Barry Tarlow (1939–2021). She established Rose K. Tarlow Antiques. Ltd. in 1974, and Rose Tarlow Melrose House in 1981.

== Interior design ==
Tarlow is known for creating rooms with highly refined wood, plaster, and stone finishes, furnished with antiques (typically English, French, and East Asian), and infused with a personal blend of minimalism and romanticism. In her own house in Bel Air, she clad her dining room floor with reclaimed stone from France, installed wide wood floor boards made from 17th-century French oak in her living room, and added ceiling beams throughout, taken from an 11th-century church in Kent, England. Like much of her work, the house has a romantic character: in 1994, the writer Susan Orlean opined that "the place had the rugged, sunny, otherworldly ambience of a California mission." In 2001, the architecture critic Julie V. Iovine wrote of Tarlow's passion for creating "rooms of haunting luxury packed with enough rarities and idiosyncratic touches to upstage a Zeffirelli opera set." In 2004, the editor Marian McEvoy wrote in Veranda magazine that Tarlow, Albert Hadley, Jacques Grange, Michael Taylor, Renzo Mongiardino, and John Stefanidis, were six interior designers who had an "enormous impact" on "the design world."

=== Representative projects ===
- Rose Tarlow Apartment, Belgrave Square, London (interior design, completed 1988, with Livio Cumbo, architect).
- Rose Tarlow Residence, Bel Air, California (interior design, completed 1990, with Larry Totah, architect).
- Barbara Walters Residence, Bel Air, California (interior design, completed ca 1990).
- Eli and Edythe Broad Residence, Brentwood, California (interior design, completed 1992, with Frank Gehry, architect and Langdon & Wilson Architects).
- David Geffen Residence, Beverly Hills, California (interior design, completed ca 1995, with Deborah Nevins, landscape design).
- Eddie Lampert Residence, Greenwich, Connecticut (interior design, completed 2001, with Michael Dwyer, architect).
- Sunshine Ranch, Aspen, Colorado (interior design, completed 2016, with Arthur Chabon, architect).

== Written works ==
- Tarlow, Rose (2022). Three Houses (1st ed.). New York: Vendome Press. ISBN 9780865654020. OCLC 1295102530.
- Tarlow, Rose (2001). The Private House (1st ed.). New York: Clarkson Potter. ISBN 9780609604724. OCLC 859073565.
