= Jovine =

Jovine (/dʒoʊˈvaɪn/) is a surname. Notable people with the surname include:

- Francesco Jovine (1902–1950), Italian writer and journalist
- Gilda Jovine (born 1981), Dominican beauty pageant titleholder, actress and model
- Marcel Jovine (1921-2003), American sculptor

== See also ==
- Iovine
