= World Trade Center station (PATH) =

Port Authority Trans-Hudson rail station

World Trade Center
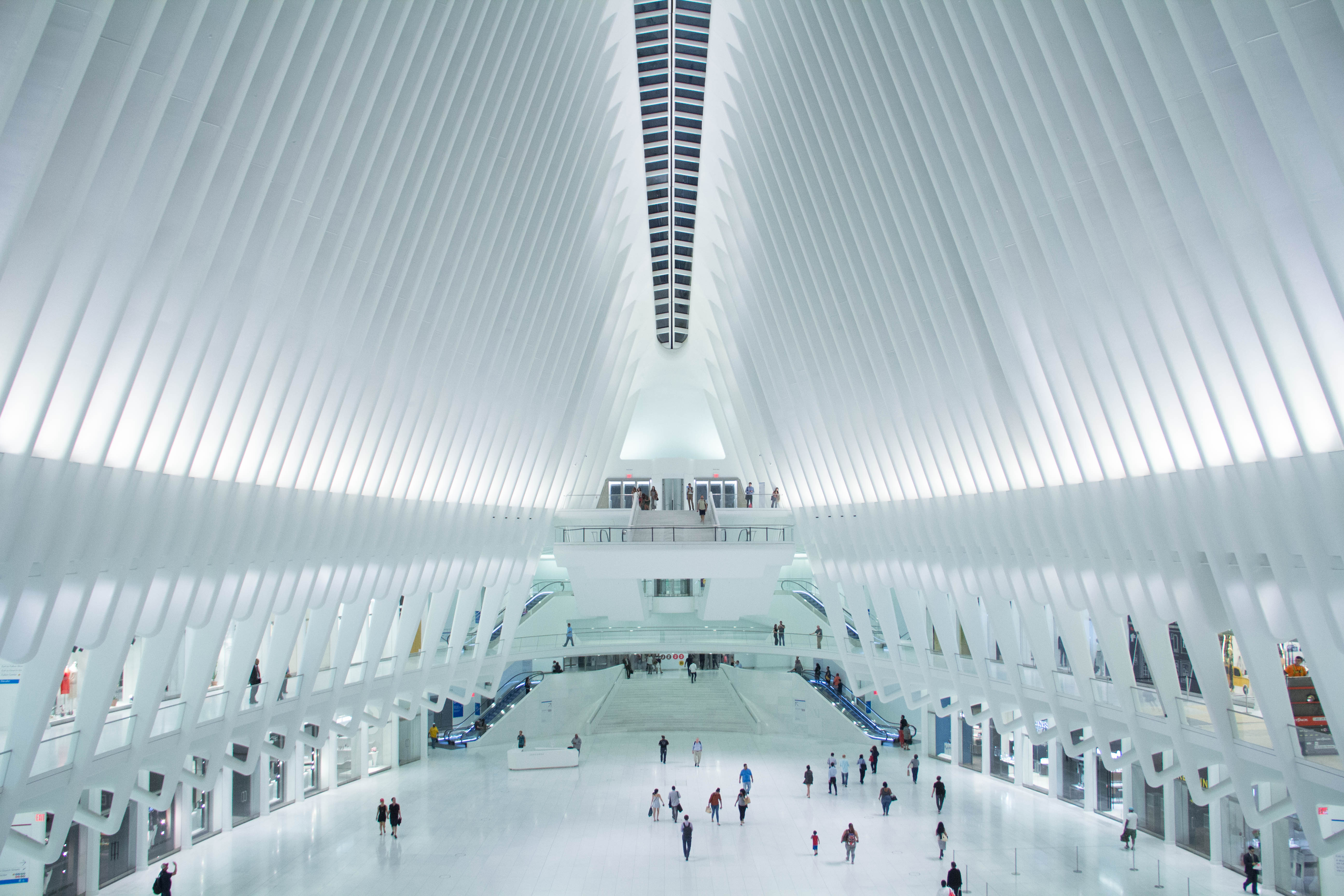
- Interior of the Transportation Hub in August 2016

General information
- Location: 70 Vesey Street; Manhattan, New York City
- Coordinates: 40.7115°N 74.0114°W
- Owner: Port Authority of New York and New Jersey
- Line: Downtown Hudson Tubes
- Platforms: 3 island platforms, 1 side platform
- Tracks: 5
- Connections: New York City Subway: at WTC Cortlandt; at Park Place and Fulton Street; at Fulton Street; at Chambers Street and Fulton Street; at World Trade Center; at Fulton Street; at Cortlandt Street; NYCT Bus: BM1, BM2, BM3, BM4, BxM18, M9, M20, M22, M55, QM7, QM8, QM11, SIM1, SIM2, SIM3, SIM4, SIM7, SIM9, SIM15, SIM32, SIM33, SIM34, X27, X28

Construction
- Structure type: Underground
- Accessible: yes

Other information
- Website: officialworldtradecenter.com/oculus

History
- Opened: 1971
- Rebuilt: 2003 (temporary), 2016

Passengers
- 2025: 14,216,591 ▲6%
- Rank: 1 of 13

Services
Preceding station	PATH	Following station
Exchange Place toward Newark	NWK–WTC	Terminus
Exchange Place toward Hoboken	HOB–WTC	Terminus
Track layout
Location

World Trade Center station is a terminal station on the PATH system, within the World Trade Center complex in the Financial District of Manhattan, New York City. It is served by the Newark–World Trade Center line at all times, as well as by the Hoboken–World Trade Center line at all times except nights, and is the eastern terminus of both.

The World Trade Center station is near the site of the Hudson and Manhattan Railroad's (H&M) Hudson Terminal, which opened in 1909. The Port Authority of New York and New Jersey bought the bankrupt H&M system in 1961, rebranded it as PATH, and redeveloped Hudson Terminal as part of the World Trade Center. The World Trade Center station opened on July 6, 1971, as a replacement for Hudson Terminal, which was closed and demolished as part of the construction of the World Trade Center. Following the September 11 attacks, a temporary PATH station opened in 2003 while the World Trade Center complex was being rebuilt. Work on a permanent station building commenced in 2008. The main station house, the Oculus, opened on March 3, 2016, and the terminal was renamed the World Trade Center Transportation Hub, or "World Trade Center" for short.

The station has five tracks and four platforms in the middle of a turning loop. Trains from New Jersey use the loop to turn around and head back to New Jersey. The platforms are four floors below ground level. The floor immediately above the platforms is occupied by the station's fare mezzanine. The New York City Subway's WTC Cortlandt station is adjacent to and above the mezzanine.

The Oculus station house, designed by Spanish architect Santiago Calatrava, consists of white ribs that interlock high above the ground. The interior of the station house contains two underground floors, which house part of the Westfield World Trade Center mall. The transportation hub connects the various modes of transportation in Lower Manhattan, from the Fulton Center in the east to the Battery Park City Ferry Terminal in the west, and includes connections to various subway stations. It is the fifth-busiest transportation hub in the New York metropolitan area. The new station has received mixed reviews: although the hub has been praised for its design, it has also been criticized for its high costs and extended delays.

== Station layout ==
The station has five tracks served by three island platforms and one side platform in a basement four stories underground. Platform A, next to tracks 1 and 2, opened as part of the Transportation Hub on February 25, 2014. Platform B between tracks 2 and 3 opened on May 7, 2015. The other two platforms opened on September 8, 2016.

Above the station, there are three mezzanine levels. The top two levels contain shops as part of the Westfield World Trade Center. The first mezzanine level below ground also contains the Cortlandt Street–Greenwich Street station for the 1 train and a direct entrance to the northbound platform. A connection to the Cortlandt Street–Church Street station's southbound platform, for the N, R, and W trains, is located at the far east end of the mezzanine, past the mall's shops. The second mezzanine level contains the entrances to the station, as well as more connections to the subway. The third mezzanine level, located directly above the platform, contains the fare control and access to the platforms.

Prior to reconstruction, there was a temporary entrance on Church Street, which opened along with the rest of the temporary station in November 2003. With the redevelopment of the World Trade Center site, the entrances and size of the temporary station have changed over time. In 2007, the Church Street entrance was relocated to the south, and the old entrance was closed and demolished. In April 2008, a third and final temporary entrance to the station was located at Vesey Street, facing Greenwich Street and adjacent to 7 World Trade Center. The temporary entrance was a one-story building on the south side of Vesey Street. On March 3, 2016, the permanent PATH station building opened and the temporary entrance was closed. The former temporary entrance was demolished later that year to make way for the Performing Arts Center.

A connection to Brookfield Place opened on October 27, 2013, through a permanent passageway known as the West Concourse. On August 16, 2016, the Westfield World Trade Center entrance opened. To accommodate repairs to the Downtown Hudson Tubes, service on the Newark–World Trade Center line between Exchange Place and World Trade Center was suspended during almost all weekends in 2019 and 2020, except on holiday weekends.

Fulton St to Cortlandt St subway cross-section
Greenwich St	WTC Transportation; Hub (Oculus) / Westfield Shops	Church St		Broadway	Fulton; Center / Westfield; Shops		Nassau St		William St
1	WTC Transportation; Hub (Oculus) / Westfield Shops	R / W		4 / 5	Fulton; Center / Westfield; Shops		J / Z south		mezzanine
underpass	WTC Transportation; Hub (Oculus) / Westfield Shops	underpass	Dey Street Passageway	underpass	Fulton; Center / Westfield; Shops	mezzanine	J / Z north	mezzanine	2 / 3
mezzanine	WTC Transportation; Hub (Oculus) / Westfield Shops				← A / C →
PATH

== Hudson Terminal ==
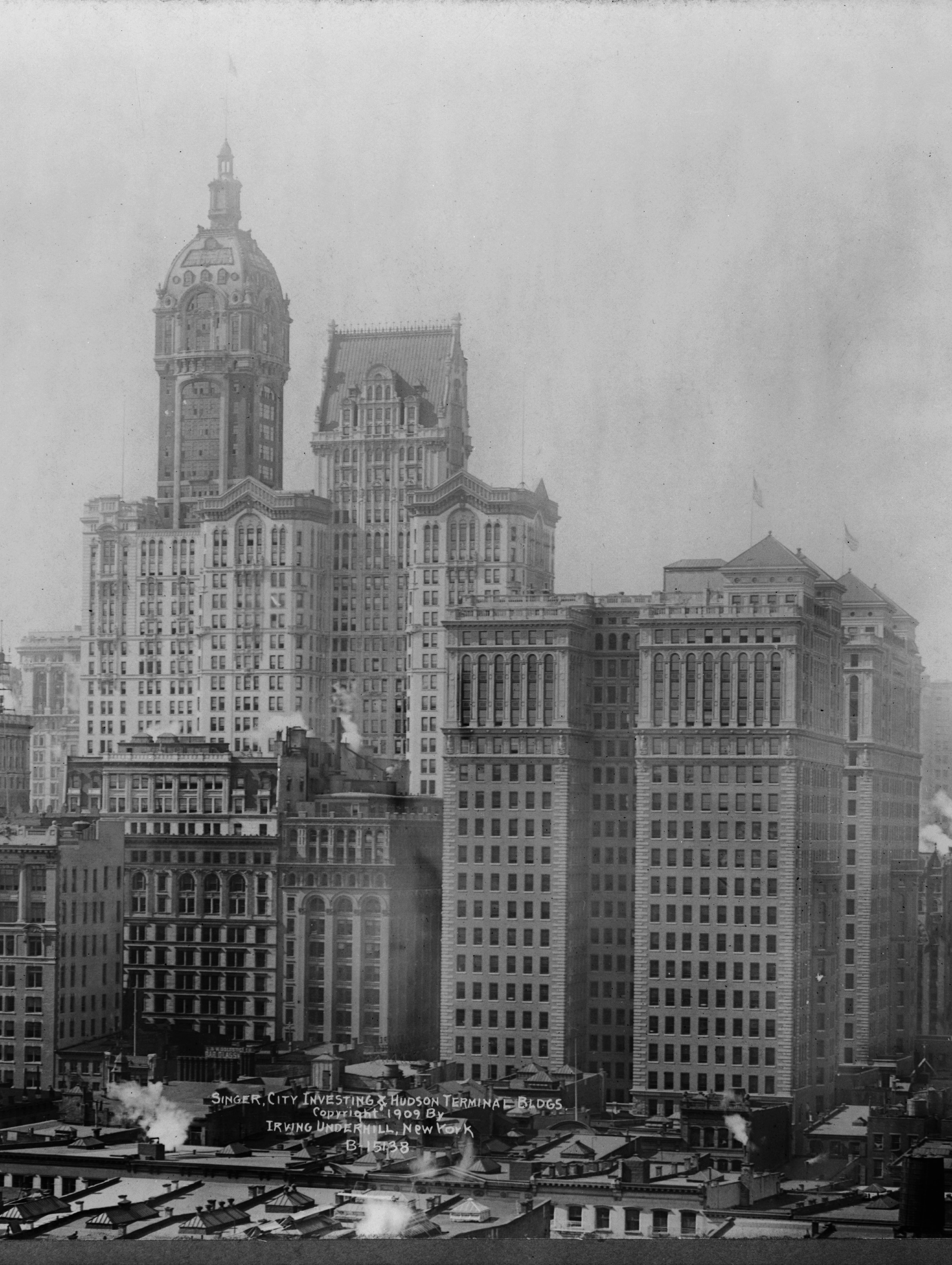
Hudson Terminal (right) and the Singer Building (left) in 1909

Hudson Terminal was built by the Hudson and Manhattan Railroad and opened on July 19, 1909. Hudson Terminal included two 22-story office buildings located above the station on the two blocks between Greenwich, Cortlandt, Church, and Fulton Streets. The terminal was designed with ramps to allow pedestrian traffic to flow in and out of the station quickly and easily. The station was served by two single-track tubes connected by a loop to speed train movements. The loop included five tracks and 3 platforms (2 center island and one side) and was somewhat similar to the arrangement of the first and second World Trade Center stations.

By 1914, passenger volume at the Hudson Terminal had reached 30,535,500 annually. Volume nearly doubled by 1922, with 59,221,354 passengers that year. Overall ridership on the Hudson and Manhattan Railroad declined substantially from a high of 113 million riders in 1927 to 26 million in 1958, after new automobile tunnels and bridges opened across the Hudson River. The H&M went bankrupt in 1954. The state of New Jersey wanted the Port Authority of New York and New Jersey to take over the railroad, but the Port Authority had long viewed it as unprofitable.

The Port Authority ultimately took over the H&M as part of an agreement concerning the construction of the World Trade Center. The Port Authority had initially proposed constructing the complex on the East River, on the opposite side of Lower Manhattan from Hudson Terminal. As an interstate agency, the Port Authority required approval for its projects from both New Jersey's and New York's state governments, but the New Jersey government objected that the proposed trade center would mostly benefit New York. In late 1961, Port Authority executive director Austin J. Tobin proposed shifting the project to Hudson Terminal and taking over the H&M in exchange for New Jersey's agreement. On January 22, 1962, the two states reached an agreement to allow the Port Authority to take over the railroad and build the World Trade Center on the Hudson Terminal site, which was by then deemed obsolete.

== Old PATH stations ==
=== Original PATH station ===
Photos of the original WTC bathtub from Liberty Street (1969)

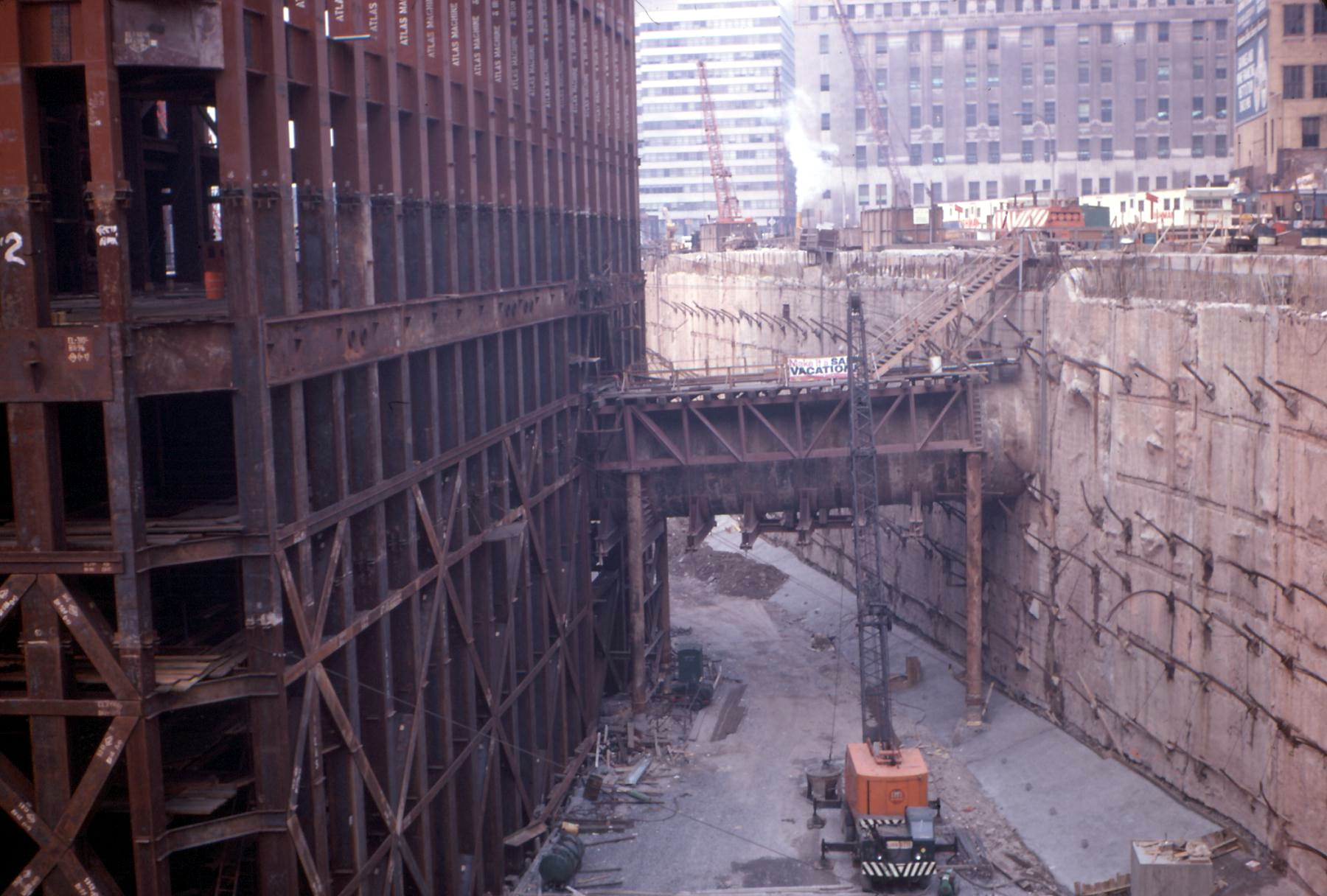
Looking northeast. The frame of the South Tower is on the left. PATH eastbound tunnel F can be seen in the center, penetrating the slurry wall on its way up Cortlandt Street to Hudson Terminal. The slurry wall runs along the west side of Greenwich Street. The IRT subway tunnel runs below the street (behind the slurry wall).

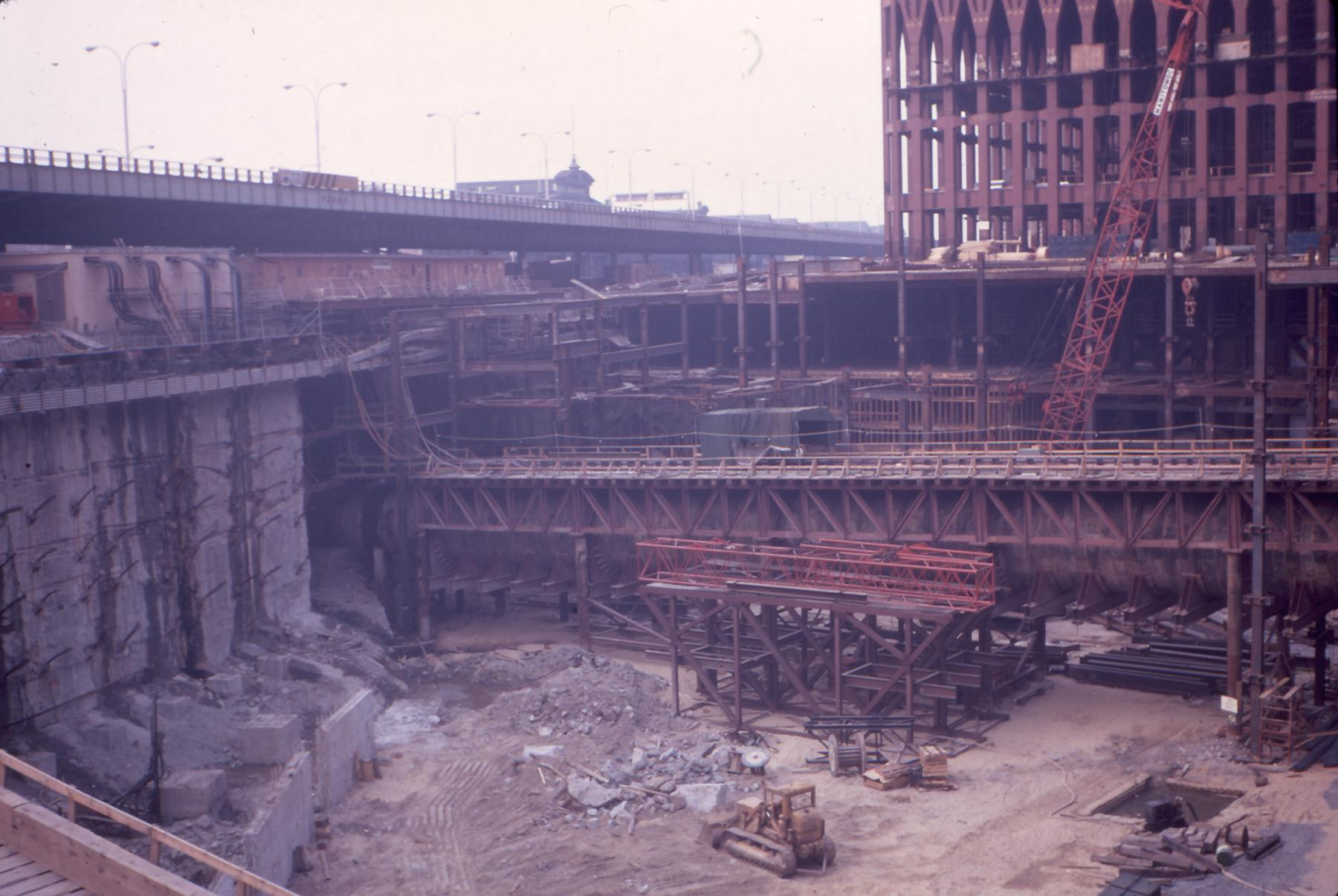
Looking northwest. PATH eastbound tunnel F supported on a temporary trestle in foreground. Slurry wall with tie-backs can be seen on the left, and the frame of the North Tower in the background. Also note the since-removed West Side Elevated Highway, which ran above West Street (today's West Side Highway).

Groundbreaking on the World Trade Center took place in 1966. The site was on land fill, with bedrock located 213 feet (65 m) below the surface. A new method was used to construct a slurry wall to keep out water from the Hudson River. During excavation of the site and construction of the towers, the original Hudson Tubes remained in service as elevated tunnels. The new station cost $35 million to build. At the time, it had a passenger volume of 85,000 daily.

The Hudson Terminal station closed on July 2, 1971, to allow a three-day maintenance period to divert service to the World Trade Center PATH station. The new PATH station opened on July 6, 1971, west of the original terminal. Larger balloon loops in the PATH station platform allowed 10-car trains; the previous station with its tight loops could only handle trains of up to 6 cars. When the station opened, it had nine high-speed escalators between the platform level and the mezzanine level. The WTC PATH station was served by Newark–World Trade Center and Hoboken–World Trade Center trains. The station was connected to the World Trade Center towers via an underground concourse and a shopping center. There were also underground connections to the New York City Subway (A, C, and E trains at World Trade Center, and N, R, and W trains at Cortlandt Street–Church Street). By 2001, the volume of passengers using the WTC PATH station was approximately 25,000 daily. While the construction of the World Trade Center neared completion, a temporary corridor was provided to take passengers between the station and a temporary entrance on Church Street.

The station sustained minor damage during the 1993 World Trade Center bombing; a section of ceiling in the station collapsed and trapped dozens. Within a week, the Port Authority was able to resume PATH service to the World Trade Center.

The station was closed on September 11, 2001, after American Airlines Flight 11 hit the North Tower of the World Trade Center at 8:46 a.m.. In the minutes afterward, three PATH trains pulled into the station. One had arrived from Newark and two others from Hoboken. The first Hoboken train turned around without stopping, not letting off passengers or opening any doors. The second Hoboken train arrived on track 3 at 8:52 a.m. and was ordered to be evacuated, employees included; the train never left the World Trade Center complex and was found during the 9/11 recovery process. Two lightly damaged cars from that train were subsequently sent to museums. A train from Newark came into the terminal at 8:55 a.m. and stopped only to pick up passengers. After United Airlines Flight 175 hit the South Tower at 9:03 a.m., dispatchers ordered the closure of the Exchange Place and World Trade Center stations; the former was closed due to severe water damage. A fourth train was sent to the station at 9:10 a.m. to pick up a dozen PATH employees and a homeless individual. Once that train evacuated the remaining people, the station was empty, and was subsequently destroyed during the collapse of the World Trade Center.

=== Temporary PATH station ===
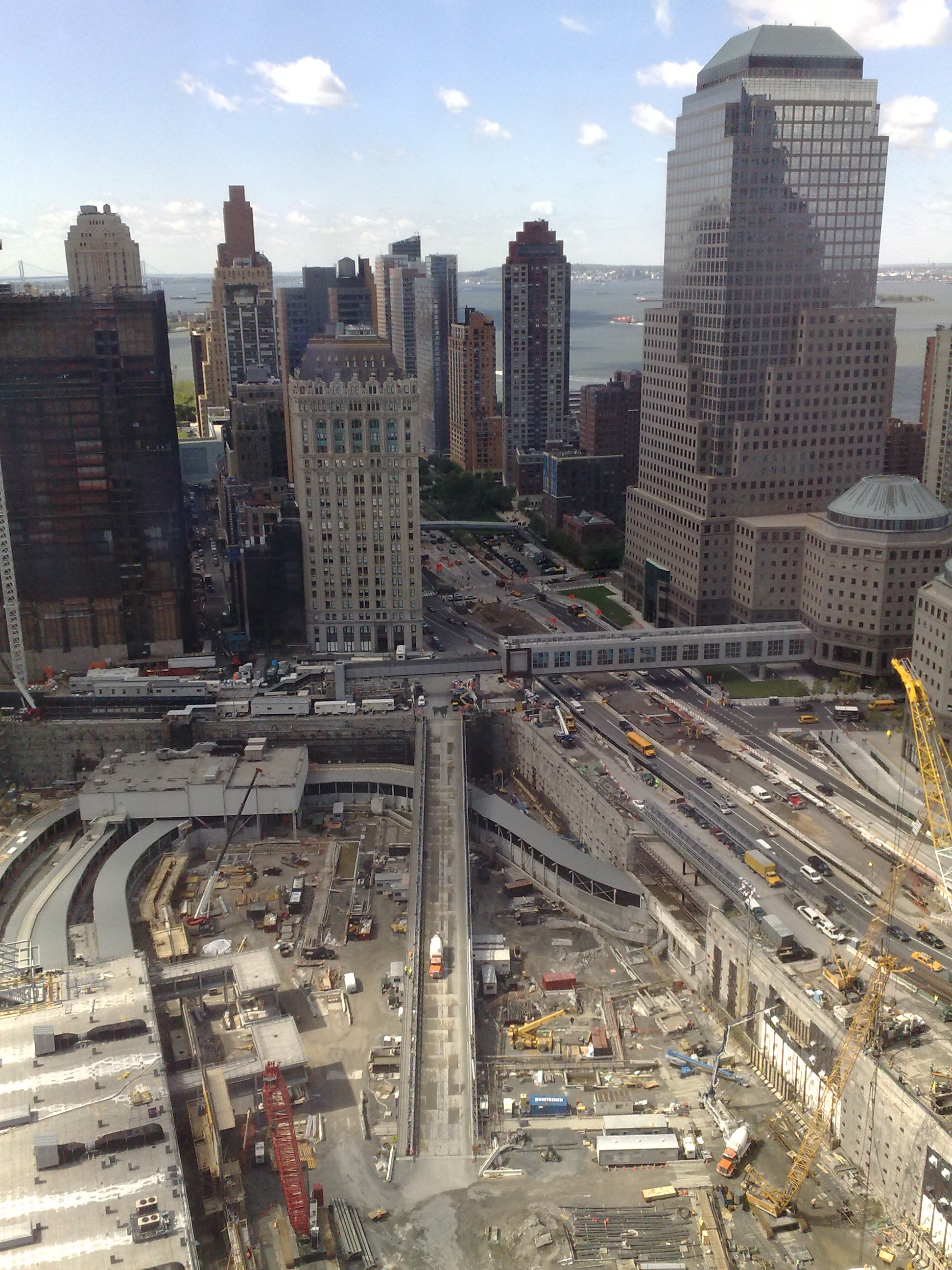
View of the balloon loop at the temporary PATH station from above.

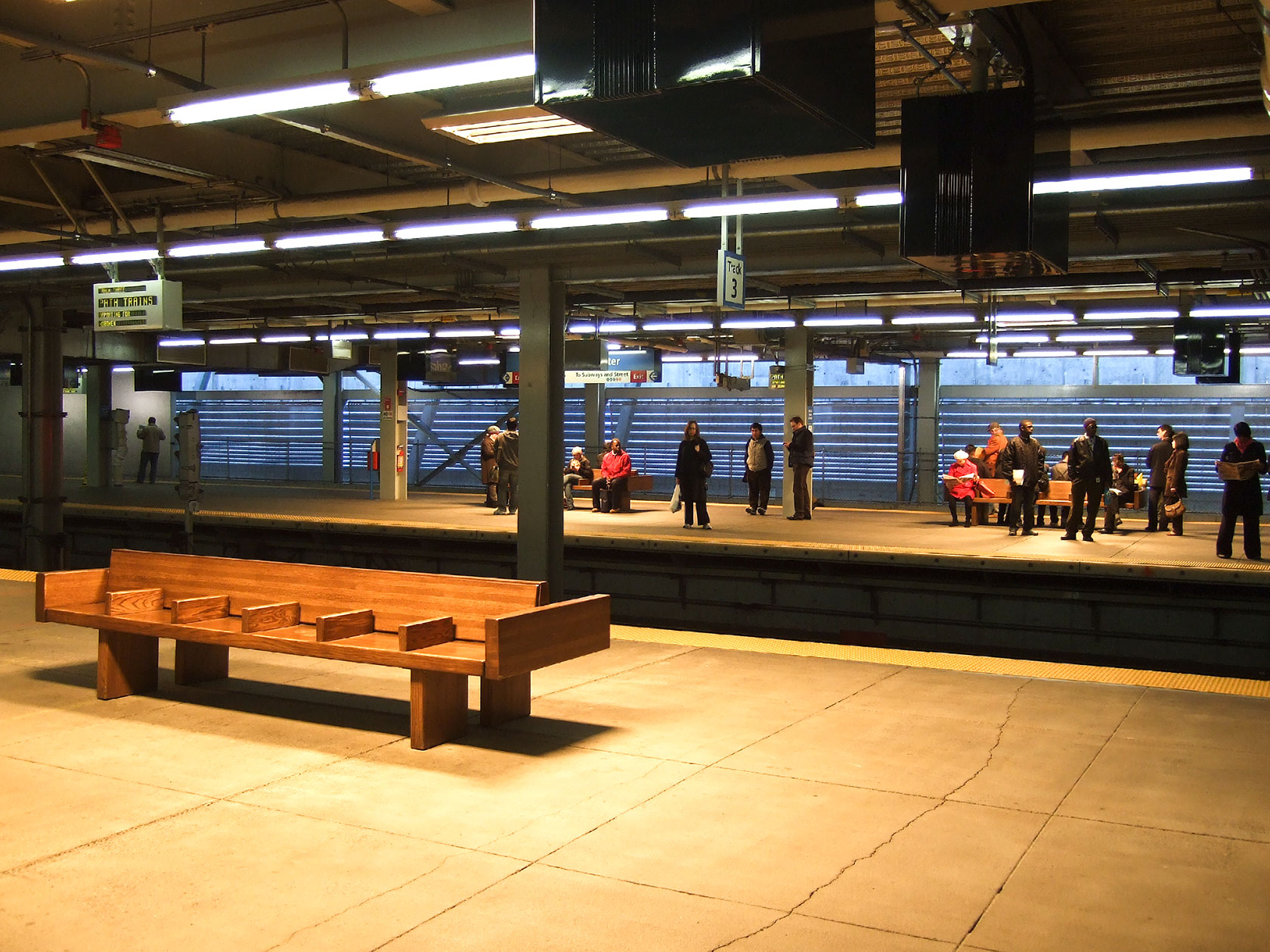
Platform of temporary station

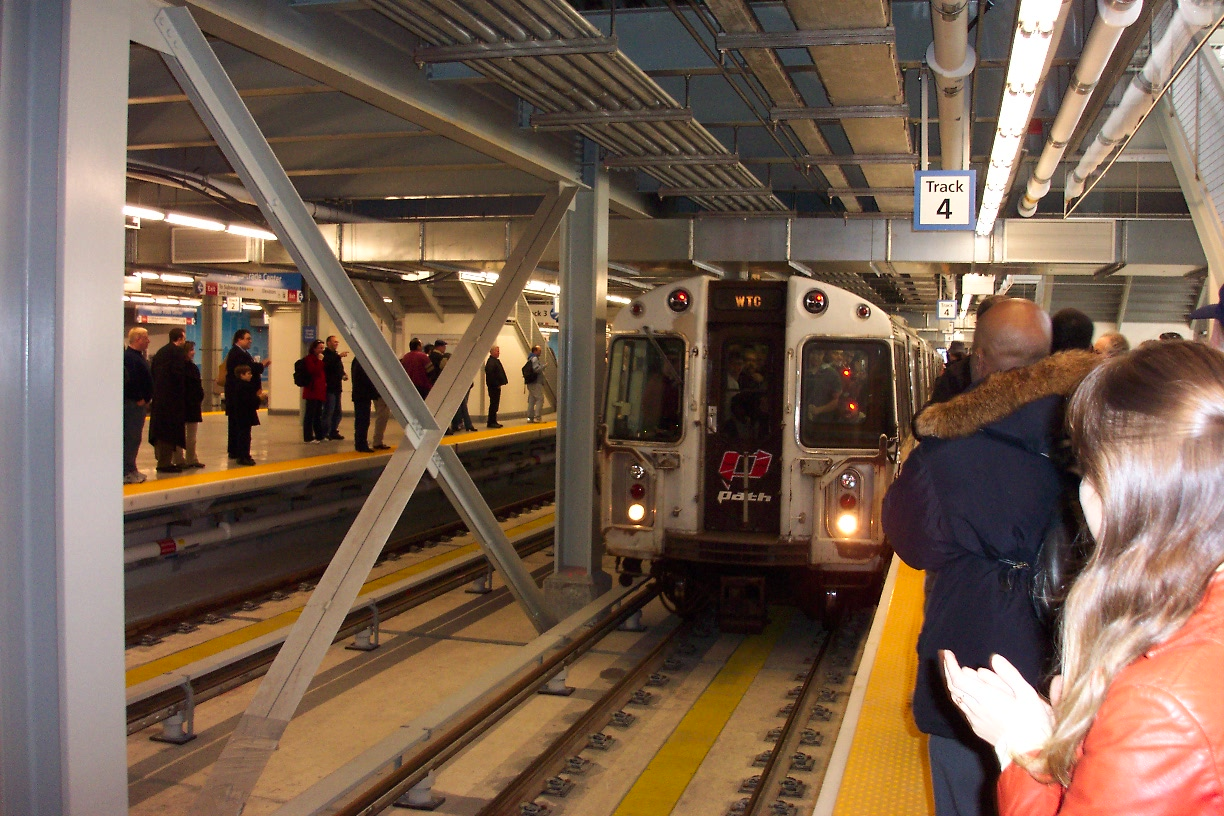
Inaugural train arrives from Newark at PATH's temporary WTC station on November 23, 2003 at 2:08 p.m.

With the station destroyed, service to Lower Manhattan was suspended for over two years. Exchange Place, the next station on the Newark–World Trade Center line, also had to be closed because it could not operate as a terminal station. Instead, two uptown services (Newark–33rd Street, red on the official PATH map; and Hoboken–33rd Street, blue on the map) and one intrastate New Jersey service (Hoboken–Journal Square, green on the map) were put into operation. Cleanup of the Exchange Place station was needed after the attacks. In addition, the downtown Hudson tubes had been flooded, which destroyed the track infrastructure. Modifications to the tracks were also required since the Exchange Place station was not a terminal station. The uptown PATH tubes, ferry routes, and NJ Transit lines across the Hudson River could not handle the displaced ridership on their own, and it was deemed necessary to rebuild the World Trade Center terminal. After the reconfiguration of the Exchange Place station was completed, it was reopened to PATH trains on June 29, 2003. The setup was temporary: passengers at Exchange Place would transfer to ferries to Lower Manhattan until the World Trade Center station could be reopened later that year.

PATH service to Lower Manhattan was restored when a temporary station opened on November 23, 2003. The inaugural train was the same one that had been used for the evacuation. The temporary PATH station was designed by Port Authority chief architect Robert I. Davidson and constructed at a cost of $323 million. It was located at the same place as the original station. The station featured a canopy entrance along Church Street and a 118-by-12-foot (36 by 3.7 m) mosaic mural, "Iridescent Lightning", by Giulio Candussio of the Scuola Mosaicisti del Friuli in Spilimbergo, Italy. The station was also adorned with opaque panel walls inscribed with inspirational quotes attesting to the greatness and resilience of New York City. These panels partially shielded the World Trade Center site from view.

Some sections of the station, including the passageway and the signage on the northeast corner, were only lightly damaged on September 11, 2001, during the collapse of the World Trade Center. These sections of the station were retained in the temporary station, and remained in the new station. Following its reopening and the resumption of Newark–World Trade Center and Hoboken–World Trade Center services, the station quickly reclaimed its status as the busiest station in the PATH system. However, it had several limitations. The temporary station had 8-car-long platforms, whereas the original station had 10-car-long platforms. The station frame was also not strong enough to support development above it, and parts of the station were located outdoors in the "bathtub". The temporary station had only one entrance, at Church Street, and disabled patrons needed to take four elevators to go from street level to platform level.

The station was also home to a StoryCorps booth, which opened in 2005. Through this program, visitors could arrange to give oral recorded histories of the disaster. The booth closed in the spring of 2007 to make way for construction at the World Trade Center site. In June 2007, the street entrance to the temporary station was closed and demolished as part of the site construction. A set of new staircases was constructed several feet to the south, and a "tent" structure was added to provide cover from the elements. The tent structure, by Voorsanger Architects and installed at a cost of $275,000, was designed to have an "aspiring quality", according to architect Bartholomew Voorsanger. That entrance on Church Street was closed in April 2008 when the entrance was relocated once again. On April 1, 2008, the third temporary entrance to the PATH station opened for commuters. The entrance was located on Vesey Street, adjacent to 7 World Trade Center. It was demolished with the opening of the permanent Calatrava-designed station, since it was on the site of the future Performing Arts Center.

== World Trade Center Transportation Hub ==
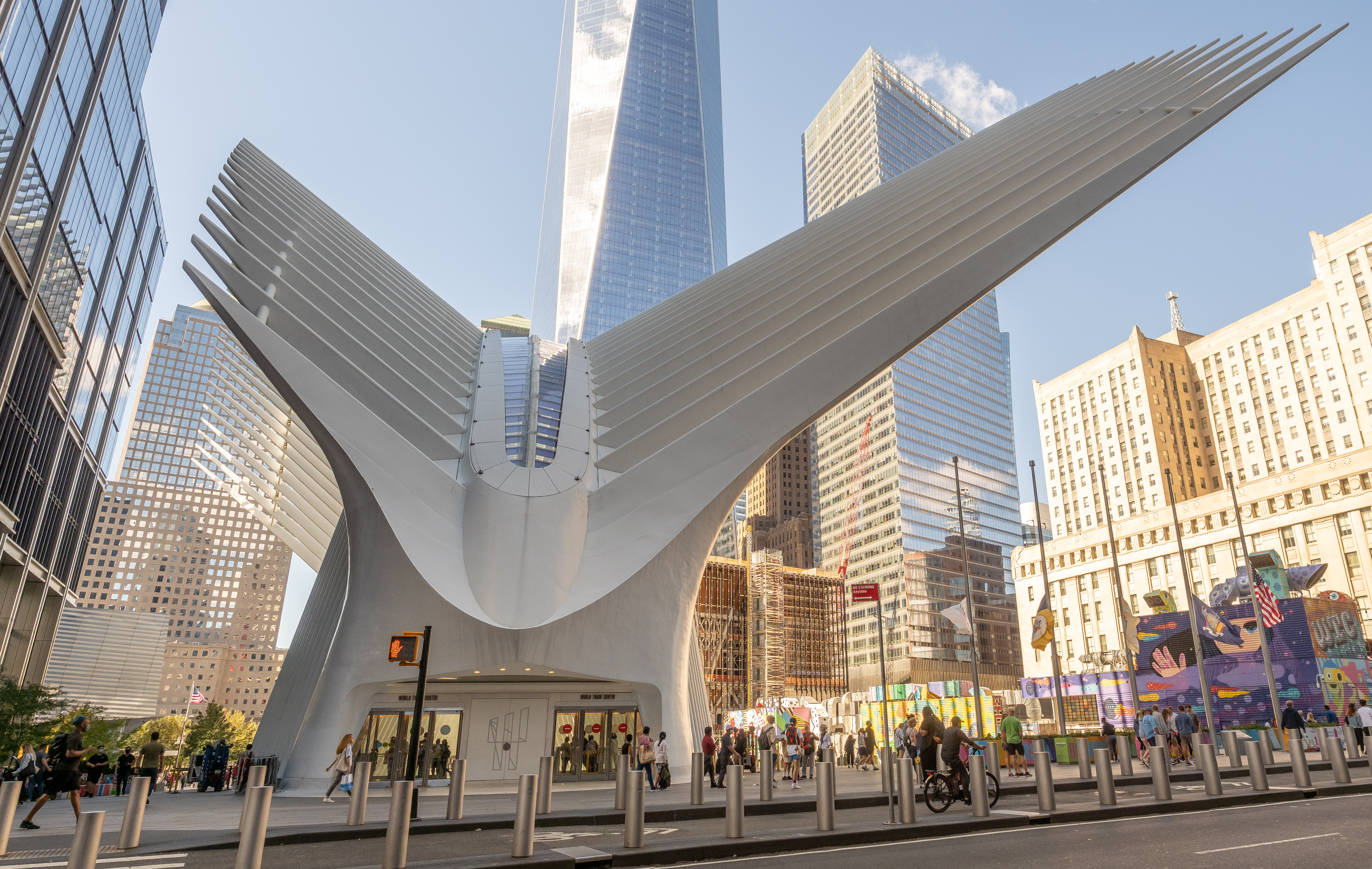
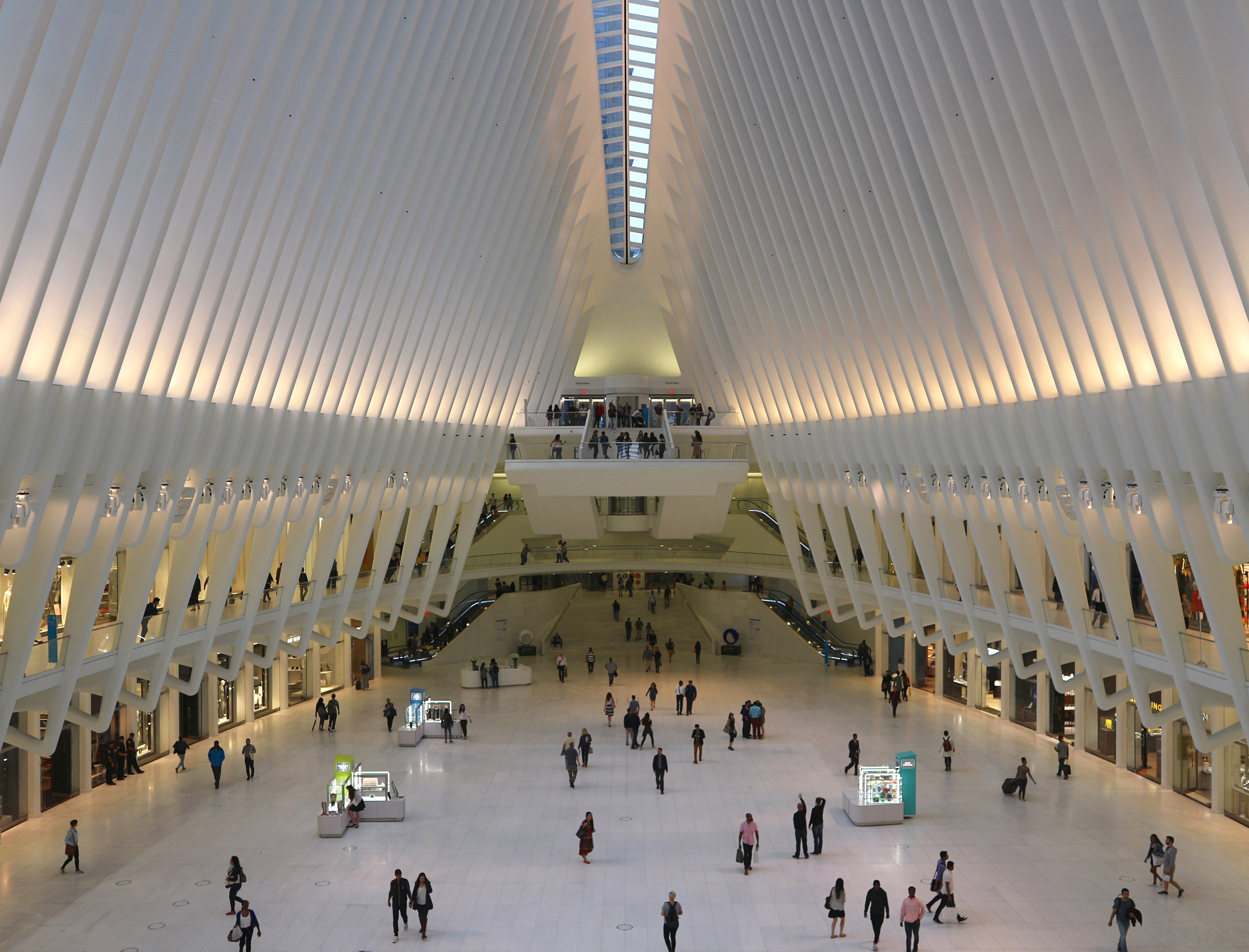
Exterior and interior of the Oculus building

The World Trade Center Transportation Hub is the Port Authority of New York and New Jersey's formal name for the new PATH station and the associated transit and retail complex that opened on March 3, 2016. The station's renaming took place when the station reopened. It was designed by Spanish architect Santiago Calatrava and composed of a train station with a large and open mezzanine under the National September 11 Memorial plaza. This mezzanine is connected to an aboveground head house structure called the Oculus—located between 2 World Trade Center and 3 World Trade Center—as well as to public concourses under the various towers in the World Trade Center complex.

In addition, the station was designed to connect the PATH to the New York City Subway system, and to facilitate a below ground east–west passageway that connects to the various modes of transportation in Lower Manhattan, from the Fulton Center to the Battery Park City Ferry Terminal. Furthermore, to replace the lost retail space from the original mall at the World Trade Center, significant portions of the Hub are devoted to the new 365,000-square-foot (33,900 m^{2}) Westfield World Trade Center mall.

=== Background ===
Preliminary site plans for the new World Trade Center

After the September 11 attacks, officials proposed a $7 billion redesign of transit in Lower Manhattan. This included a new PATH terminal, the Fulton Center, the South Ferry/Whitehall Street terminal further downtown, and the reconstruction of the West Side Highway. Other development projects to restart Lower Manhattan's economy were also proposed, and a new PATH terminal was seen as instrumental in making this happen. In August 2002, the U.S. government allocated $4.5 billion to build a terminal linking the subway and PATH stations at the World Trade Center site. Four locations were considered, and it was ultimately decided to build the new terminal four levels underground, along the base of the World Trade Center "bathtub".

A large transit station was not part of the 2003 Memory Foundations master plan for the site by Daniel Libeskind, which called for a smaller station along the lines of the original subterranean station that existed beneath the World Trade Center. Libeskind's design proposed that the current station house's site be left as an open plaza, forming a "Wedge of Light" so that sun rays around the autumnal equinox would hit the World Trade Center footprints each September. The plaza would have included a wedge whose lines showed the sun's rays at 8:46 a.m. and 10:28 a.m. on September 11 of each year. These times respectively represented when American Airlines Flight 11 crashed into the North Tower and when it collapsed.

=== Redesign ===
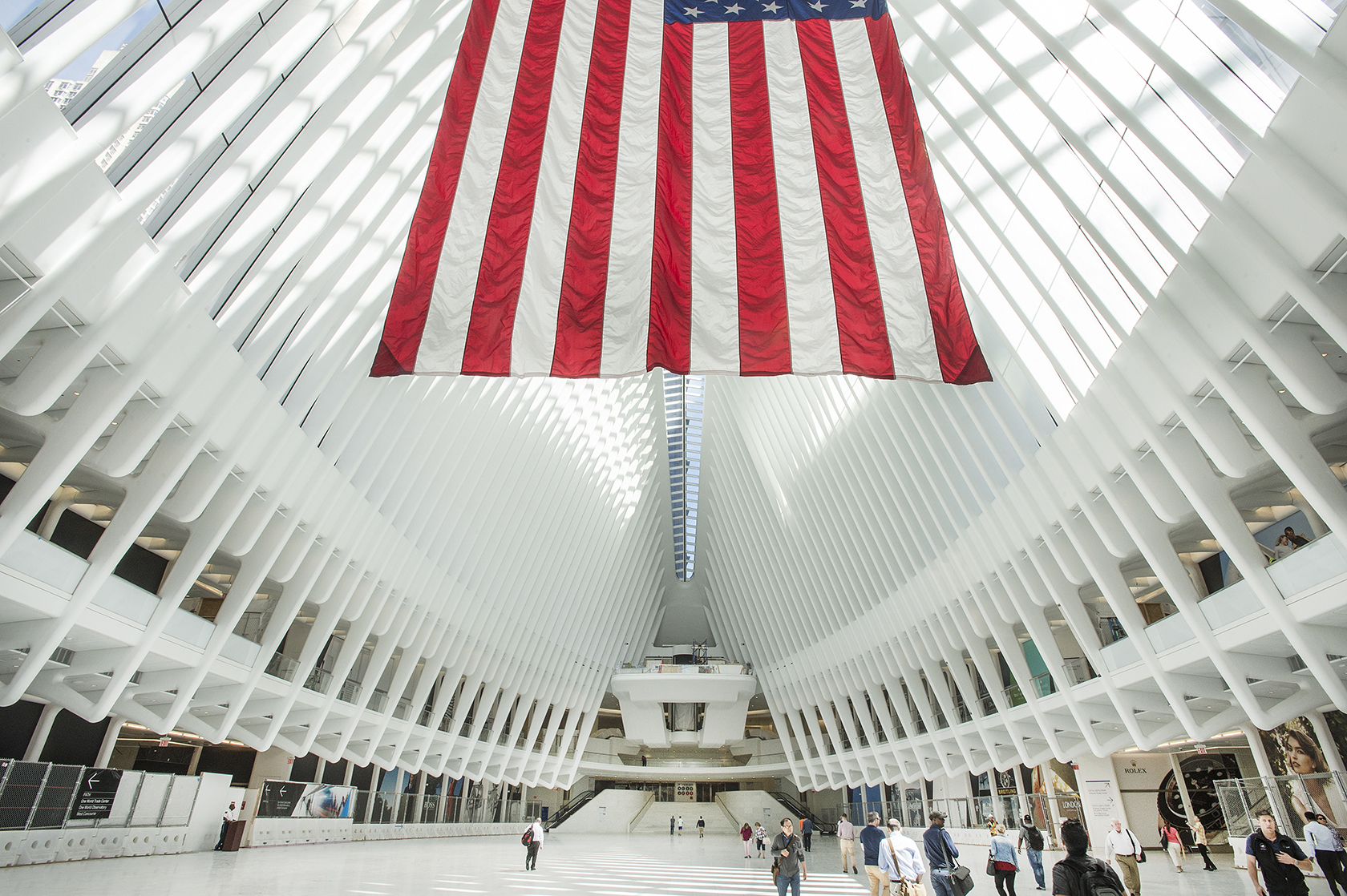
Inside the Oculus, leading to the Dey Street Concourse

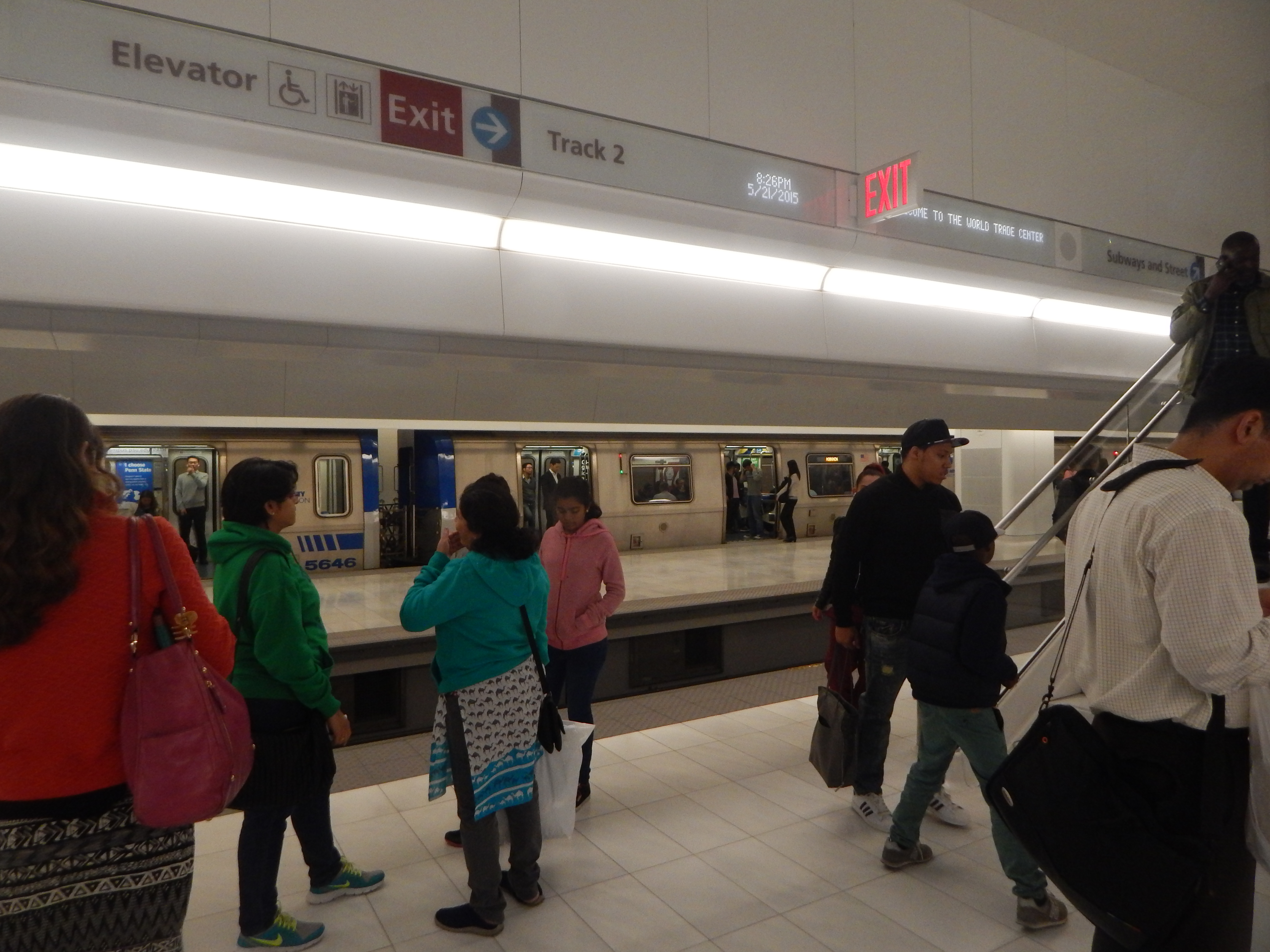
Platform level

In early 2004, the Port Authority, which owns the land, modified the Libeskind plan to include a large transportation station downtown, intended to rival Penn Station and Grand Central Terminal. Calatrava was hired as the architect for this new, $2 billion design, and he revealed his plan in January 2004. Calatrava's design called for an above-ground station house (now the Oculus) with curved supports that extended outward, like wings. These wings would run the length of the concourse, which would run from Church Street in the east to the PATH station under Greenwich Street in the west. The building itself would be located on its own block, bounded clockwise from the north by Fulton, Church, Dey, and Greenwich Streets.

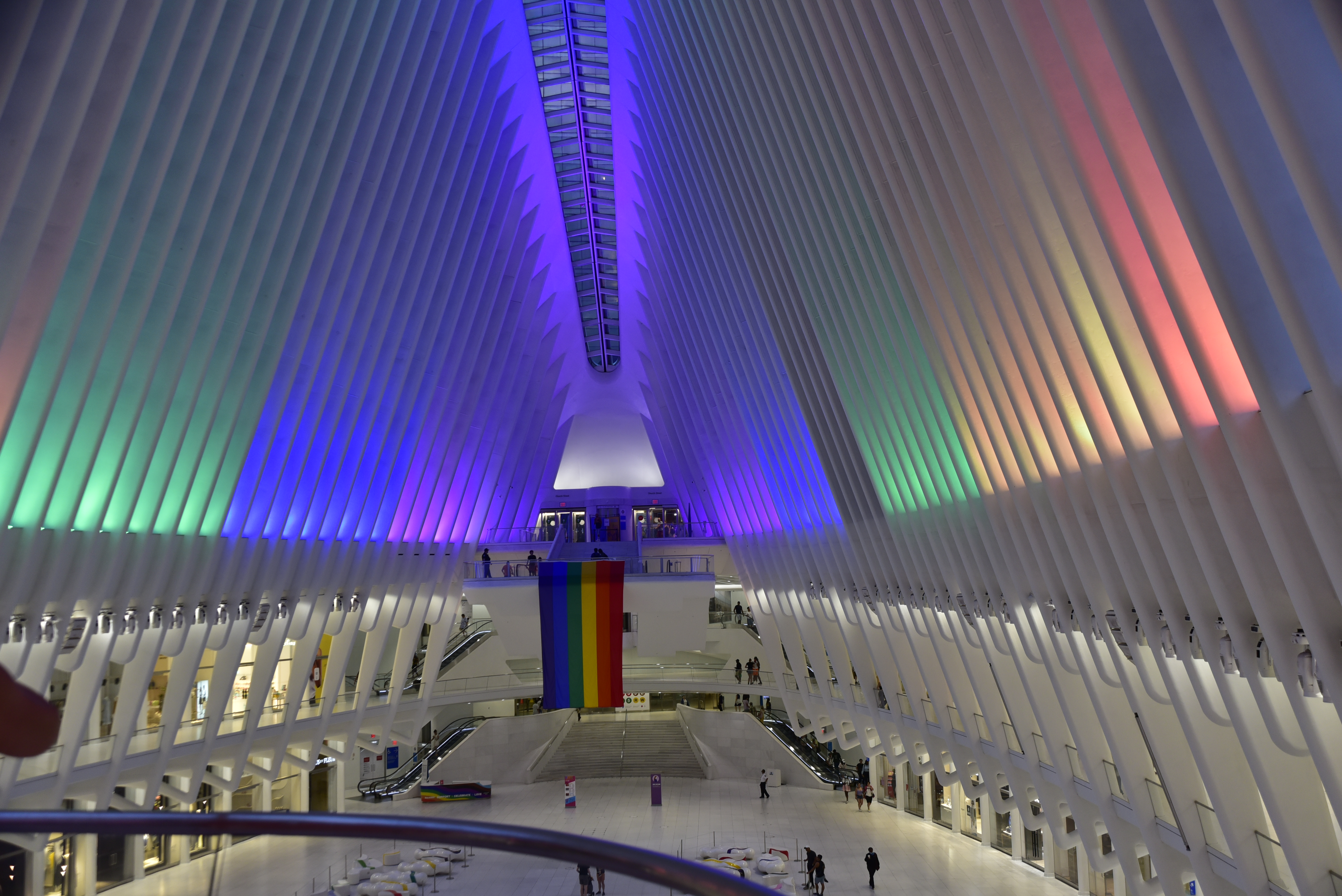
Oculus during Pride Month

A skylight would run the length of the station building, spanning about 330 feet (100 m). The roof was originally designed to mechanically open to increase light and ventilation to the enclosed space. In a nod to the Libeskind concept, the Oculus was built to maximize the effect of the autumnal equinox rays (coinciding with the skylight opening on or around September 11 every year). On the actual anniversary of the attacks, the skylight would open for 102 minutes to commemorate the duration between the time the first tower was hit and the collapse of the second tower. If needed, the skylight could also be manually opened to provide air ventilation. The space under the skylight was to be flanked by stores.

As outlined in the reconstruction plan, the new terminal would be rebuilt in several stages. The first phase would include the construction of a temporary northern entrance, which would be open between 2005 and 2006. The second phase would entail the construction of an East-West Concourse under the West Side Highway, connecting to the World Financial Center (now Brookfield Place). The third phase would include temporary structural underpinning for a temporary platform and track, as well as the construction of Platform D, the first permanent platform. The fourth phase would consist of the lengthening of the other three platforms, expansion of the mezzanine, and structural completion, while the fifth phase would include the construction of the station house. The complex would be completed by 2009 or 2010 under this plan.

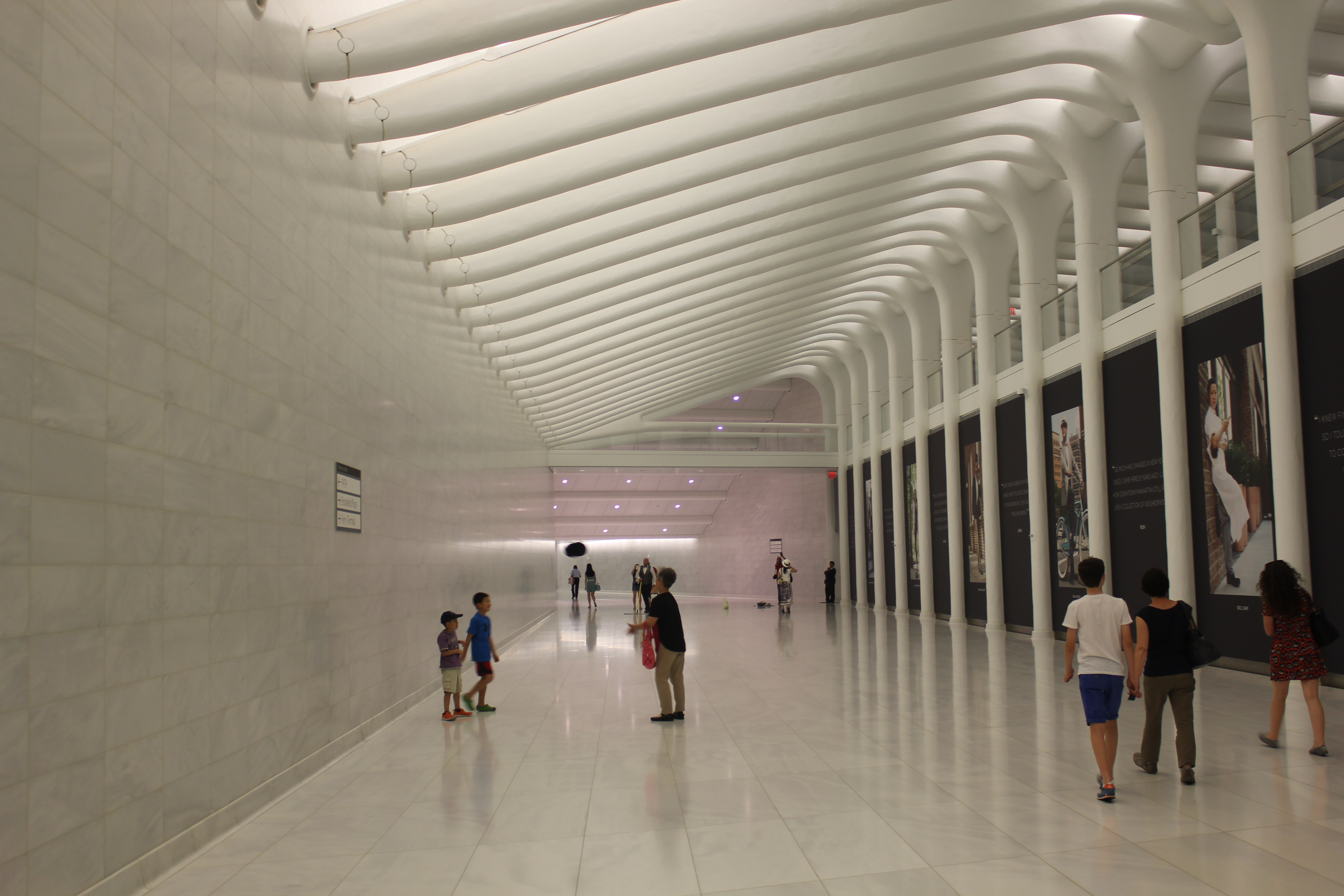
The West Concourse

A 600-foot (180 m) pedestrian underpass under the West Side Highway, referred to as the West Concourse and formerly as the East-West Connector, links the WTC station mezzanine with Brookfield Place in Battery Park City, on the west side of the World Trade Center. It contains stores as part of Westfield World Trade Center. The concourse itself opened on October 23, 2013. Access to One World Trade Center from the West Concourse became possible for employees when the tower opened on November 3, 2014. On May 29, 2015, the same day the tower's observatory opened, the entrance to the observation deck opened. The concourse cost $225 million to build, and has been described as the most expensive passageway in the world. The West Concourse has stores only on its northern wall because the southern wall faces the National September 11 Memorial & Museum.

==== Reception ====
The station design received acclaim. In 2004, Herbert Muschamp, architecture critic for The New York Times, compared the design to the Bethesda Terrace and Fountain in Central Park. He congratulated the Port Authority for hiring Calatrava, and predicted that the new station would be able to impact the city's future. Muschamp continued that the architect's vision "should satisfy those who believe that buildings planned for ground zero must aspire to a spiritual dimension." Another New York Times critic, Michael Kimmelman, wrote that the PATH hub was appropriate for the World Trade Center site, as it would be "a major cultural contribution" to the New York City skyline. A committee for Manhattan Community Board 1 called the station design "beautiful" in 2005.

Calatrava described the original design as representative of "a bird being released from a child's hand". However, Calatrava's original soaring spike design was scaled back because of security issues. The New York Times observed in 2005 that the "bird has grown a beak", and that because of the new security features, the station might "now evoke a slender stegosaurus more than it does a bird". The design was further modified in 2008 to eliminate the opening and closing roof mechanism because of budget and space constraints.

A Curbed NY reporter wrote in 2015, "The platform's mezzanine level ... is kind of amazing and shows off the station's soaring ribbed structure", but other reviews derided the station redesign as being more gaudy than utilitarian. In 2014, Benjamin Kabak, a blogger writing for The Atlantic's CityLab, criticized the emphasis placed on form over function, citing design flaws driven by aesthetic choices that detract from the station's usability as a transit hub. He stated that the staircases could not accommodate the number of passengers using the station during rush hours, and that any leaks caused the marble floors to become slippery. Kabak also said that "the PATH Hub is shaping up to be an example of design divorced from purpose." Steve Cuozzo of the New York Post described the station in 2014 as it was being built as "a self-indulgent monstrosity" and "a hideous waste of public money". Michael Kimmelman, architecture critic for The New York Times, referred to the structure as "a kitsch stegosaurus". In 2015, as the station neared completion, New York magazine referred to the hub as a "Glorious Boondoggle" and, while withholding final judgment on the unfinished structure, did note the "Jurassic" appearance. When the station opened in 2016, the New York Post editorial board called the hub the "world's most obscenely overpriced commuter rail station — and possibly its ugliest", deeming the transit hub a "white elephant" and "monstrosity", comparing the Oculus to a "giant gray-white space insect".

=== Construction ===
Construction of the Oculus called for relocation of the World Trade Center cross in April 2006. However, the Oculus's construction did not begin in earnest until July 8, 2008, when the first prefabricated "ribs" for the pedestrian walkway under Fulton Street were installed on the site. The mezzanine level of the station was undergoing major construction and work on the foundation was underway. By March 2011, over 225 of the 300 steel pieces that make up the roof of the station were installed. Later that month installation of the Vierendeel truss, one of the hub's key components, began with the installation of a 50 short tons (45 long tons) section of the 271-short-ton (242-long-ton) truss. The truss serves as the mezzanine roof and also acts as a support for the northeast corner of the WTC Memorial.

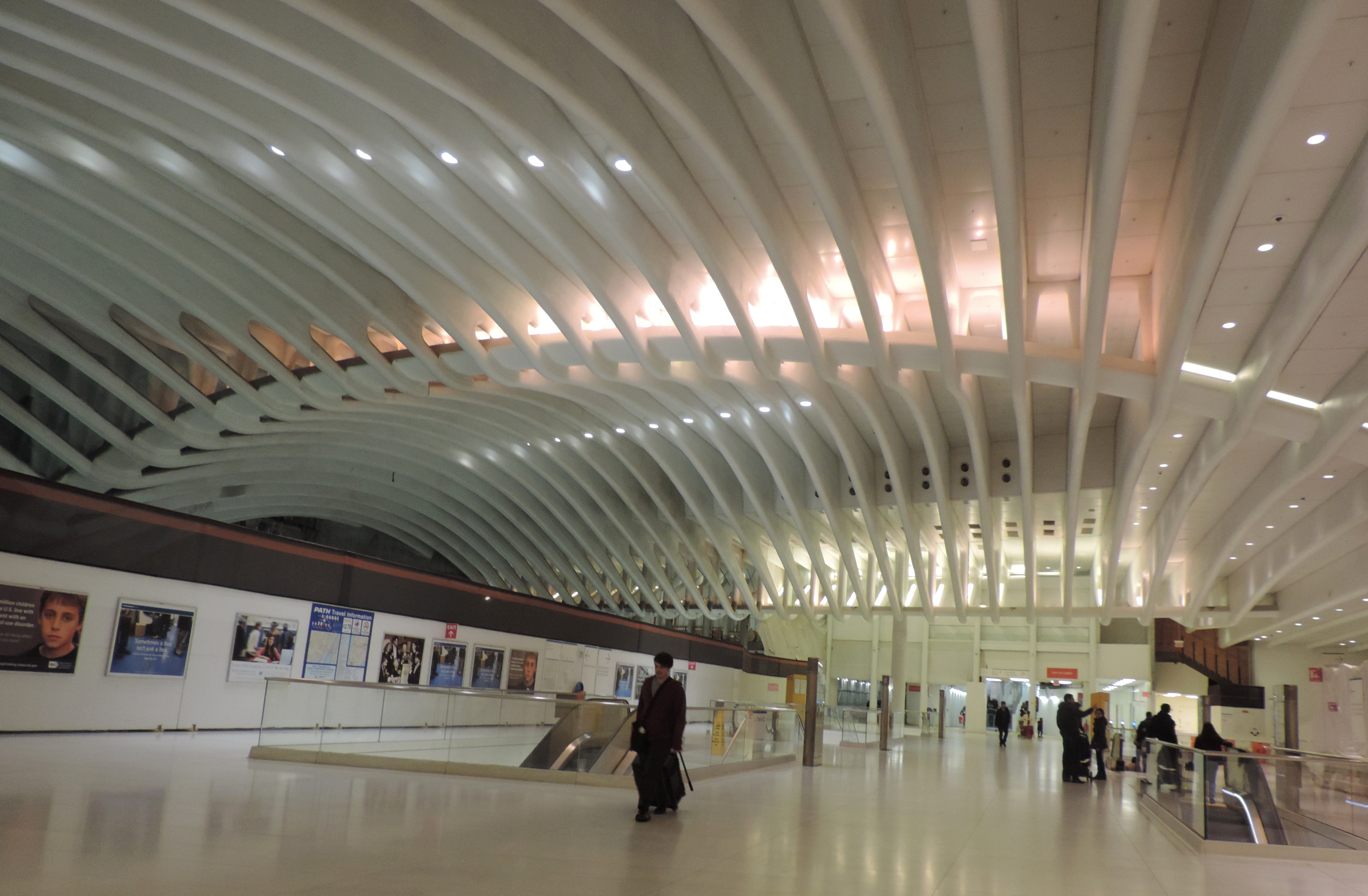
Concourse above PATH tracks

The Oculus's $542 million construction contract was awarded to Skanska in summer 2010. The project included steel erection for the substructure; construction connecting to the Vehicular Security Center; the Greenwich Street corridor and the steel and concrete placing under the 1 train's subway box; and preparations for installation of east arch truss. By June 2013, ten pieces of exterior arches were installed for the Oculus. The initial construction was expected to conclude at the end of 2014 or beginning of 2015, and the internal construction, such as paint, turnstiles, and ticket booths, was expected to complete in the end of 2015, with an official opening scheduled for December 17, 2015. On October 23, 2013, the West Concourse opened with access to the World Financial Center, now renamed the Brookfield Place. The storefronts were covered and not yet opened, and the second floor was still closed for construction of One World Trade Center.

On February 25, 2014, half of the first platform of the new station, Platform A, was opened to the public with service to Hoboken. The new platform, an island platform, was fully modernized and contains new lighting, speakers, illuminated signs, escalators, and elevators. The west side of the platform was walled off at the time. On November 3, One World Trade Center opened, as did the PATH entrance from that building. Eight days later, the Fulton Center and Dey Street Concourse opened to the public. The Dey Street Concourse entrance into the Transportation Hub was closed until the Hub opened. On November 22, the last of 114 rafters was installed. Also, by this date, one crane had been disassembled and painting of the hub continued.

On May 7, 2015, Platform B and the remaining half of Platform A opened, and Platform C closed. A few weeks later, on May 29, the entrance to the observation deck in the West Concourse was opened on the same day One World Observatory also opened. In late September, the temporary new West Walkway opened with access from the platforms to the West Concourse.

=== Cost and delays ===
The Transportation Hub has been described as either one of the world's most expensive train stations, or the world's single most expensive station, for its massive reconstruction cost of approximately $4 billion. By contrast, the proposed 2-mile (3.2 km) extension of the Newark–World Trade Center PATH service to Newark Liberty International Airport is projected to cost $1.5 billion. The hub was also criticized for its delays, as the hub was completed almost 10 years later than originally projected. However, even the original cost projections for the hub were high, as the original proposal was projected to cost almost $2 billion. The high cost for a single station is attributed to the extravagant design, which stems from the Port Authority needing to convince the government of New Jersey to pay for a project situated entirely in New York.

Originally, the reconstruction was to be funded by the Federal Transit Administration, which gave approximately $1.9 billion to the project. The costs of the hub were still expensive, but it was to be finished at budget in 2009. In 2014 dollars, the cost of the hub was estimated at $4 billion. The hub cost twice as much in 2014 as it should have originally cost in 2004. The West Concourse cost $225 million and was billed as the "world's most expensive hallway". Construction, maintenance, and management alone cost $635 million; the Port Authority awarded several subcontracts, most of them costly. The fees of the main construction team took up almost a billion dollars, and utility installation around the entire World Trade Center site cost another $400 million. Over $500 million in cost savings was overlooked.

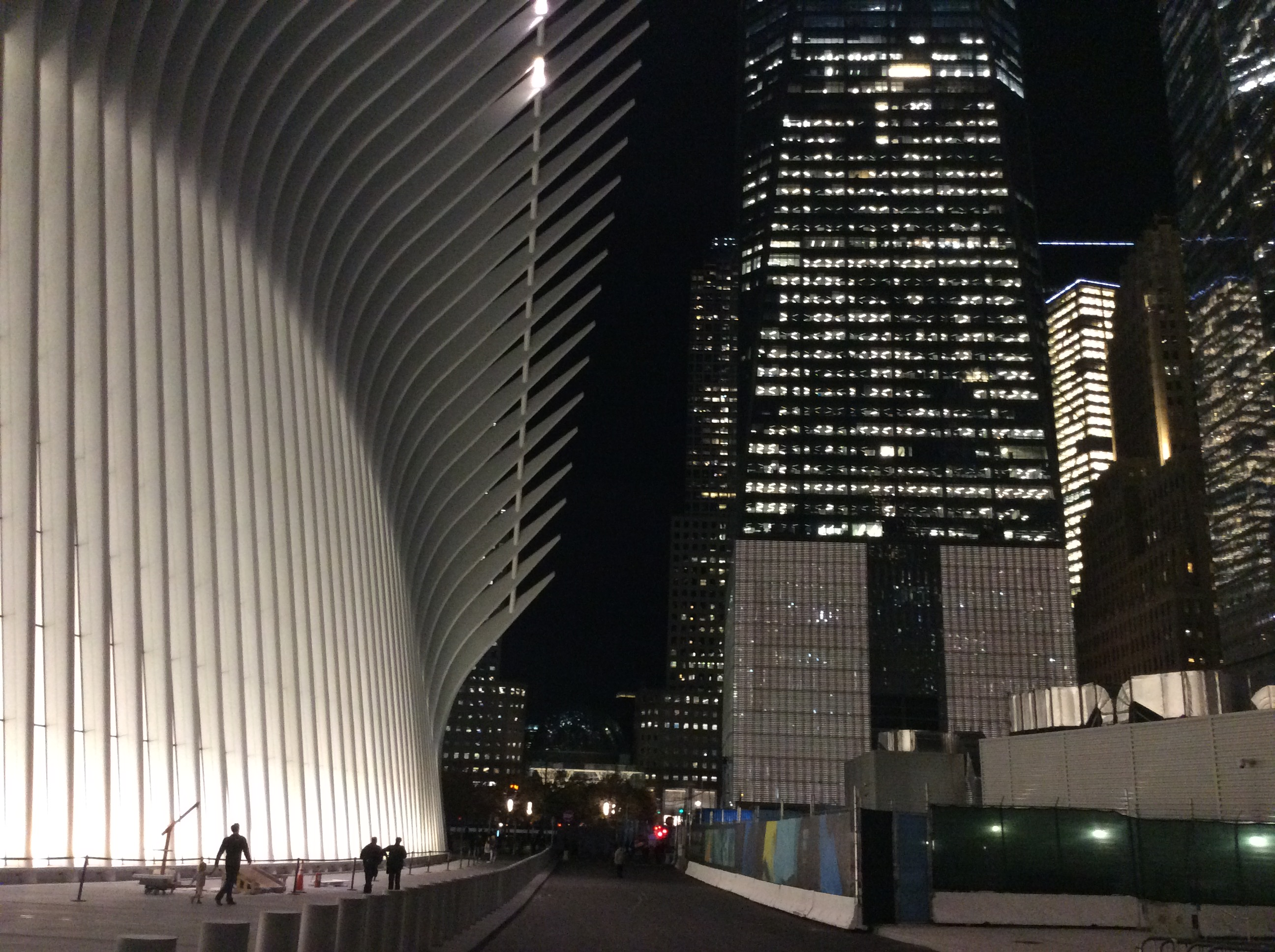
The ribs, as seen from outside the station at night

The design was costly, with Calatrava netting $80 million in design fees and the overall architectural design being another $405.8 million. Speeding up the pace of construction also contributed to the higher cost, with $100 million dedicated to building the National September 11 Memorial & Museum and another $24 million to speed up delivery of construction materials. The price of the station was further driven up by Calatrava's architectural decisions. (Note: According to The New York Times: Suggestions from independent engineers and architects that the Oculus be even smaller [were rebuffed.] ... Calatrava and his partners said that the impact and utility of the Oculus would be diminished if it were shrunken further, that the temporary station did not meet requirements for circulation of air and pedestrians, and that columns would interrupt visitors' movement and provide a potential target for bombers.) He wanted to import custom-made steel from a northern Italian factory, which cost $474 million, and have a columnless, aesthetically based design; skylights in the ground, instead of trees; (Note: The Bloomberg administration later chose to add trees instead of skylights, since the station was close to the National September 11 Memorial & Museum. This required the mezzanine's roof to be redesigned to hold a heavier weight, which was also costly.) and large, soaring "wings", or rafters. Another $335 million was added to the cost overrun because the Port Authority of New York and New Jersey had to build around the New York City Subway's IRT Broadway–Seventh Avenue Line (carrying the 1 train), since the Metropolitan Transportation Authority refused to close the line for fear of inconveniencing commuters from Staten Island taking the Staten Island Ferry. The line had to be supported on a bridge over the station instead of on columns through the station. In 2012, Hurricane Sandy damaged several hundred million dollars' worth of materials. Some of the additional cost and delay were due to additions and modifications to the original plan by the Port Authority. Calatrava's original entry pavilion was scaled back for security reasons, for instance.

The hub's rapidly expanding costs also attracted much controversy. An editor at The New York Times wrote that "Mr. Calatrava is amassing an unusually long list of projects marred by cost overruns, delays and litigation", referring to his other projects around the world that were over budget. Especially because the current station has a ridership of only 46,000 daily passengers compared to 250,000 at Grand Central Terminal, the renovation was sometimes depicted as overpriced and overstylized. According to a writer for Esquire magazine, even if the hub's cost were disregarded, operating the PATH was itself a waste of money for the Port Authority. (Note: In 2009–2013, the Port Authority lost $2 billion in revenue by operating the PATH, equating to an almost $400-million loss in annual revenue if the Port Authority operates the PATH.) Architecture writer John Hill said in 2019 that the PANYNJ's projections for the hub were highly unrealistic, since the WTC Transportation Hub received only a small fraction of Grand Central's ridership.

In late 2015, the opening was delayed to early 2016 by a leaking roof. When the hub opened in March 2016, the director of the Port Authority, Pat Foye, declined to hold an event to celebrate the opening of the Hub, describing it as "symbol of excess" and noting he was "troubled with the huge cost" of the construction project.

=== Opening ===
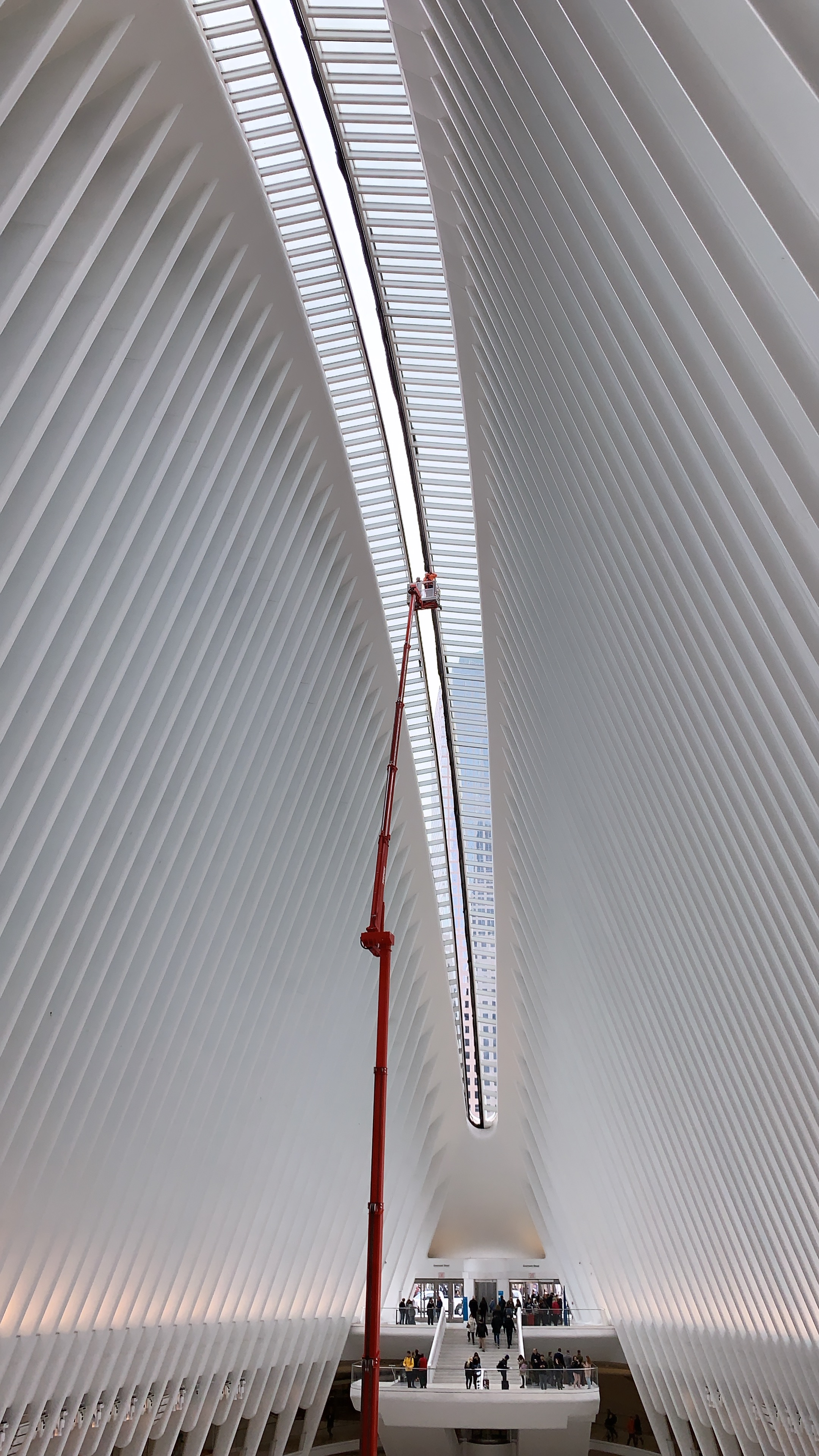
Workers open up the glass ceiling to make repairs

On March 3, 2016, the Oculus partially opened to the public, along with new entrances. Only the west end of the Oculus and the Westfield Mall corridor to Four World Trade Center was opened. Two months later, on May 26, 2016, PATH riders received a direct underground link to Fulton Center and the Cortlandt Street–Church Street station through the Oculus. The PATH entrance into 2 World Trade Center opened on June 21, 2016, and the temporary PATH entrance to outside 7 World Trade Center closed five days later. Yet another entrance opened to the public when the Westfield World Trade Center mall was opened on August 16. On September 8, 2016, the restrooms were opened on the south side of the mezzanine. The last two station platforms in the hub, Platforms C and D, were also opened, as was the permanent West Concourse walkway. On December 19, the direct underground link to the New York City Subway's World Trade Center station, at the northeast corner of the complex, reopened.

Following the 17th anniversary of the September 11 attacks in 2018, the rubber seal of the Oculus's skylight broke. As a result, for the 18th anniversary in 2019, the skylight was unable to open as scheduled.

=== Notable incidents ===
On October 13, 2016, the first birth inside the Oculus occurred. A woman was walking through the station with her husband when she went into labor, eventually giving birth on the floor. Another woman had previously given birth inside the old PATH station in August 2015.

A few months later, on February 11, 2017, the first death inside the Oculus occurred. A woman from New Jersey, Jenny Santos, fell to her death from an escalator. News reports initially said she was trying to retrieve a hat dropped by her sister, but lost her balance and fell; it was later revealed that she "was pretending to be flying" while lying on the escalator's handrail. After her death, there was some focus on the height of the 3-foot-4-inch (1.02 m) handrails, and how they could pose a safety risk.

== Adjacent transit connections ==
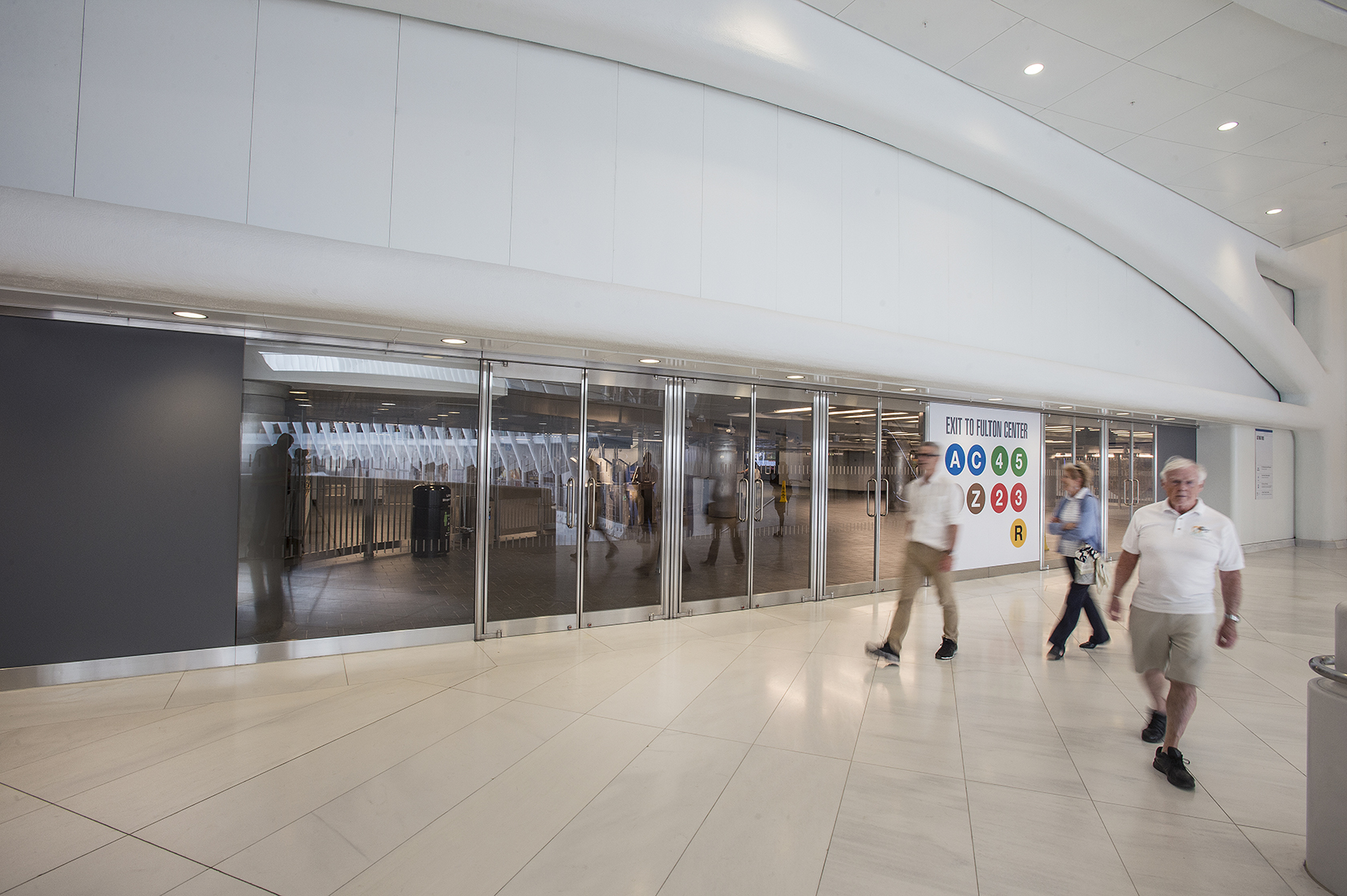
The World Trade Center station's connection to the Cortlandt Street station.

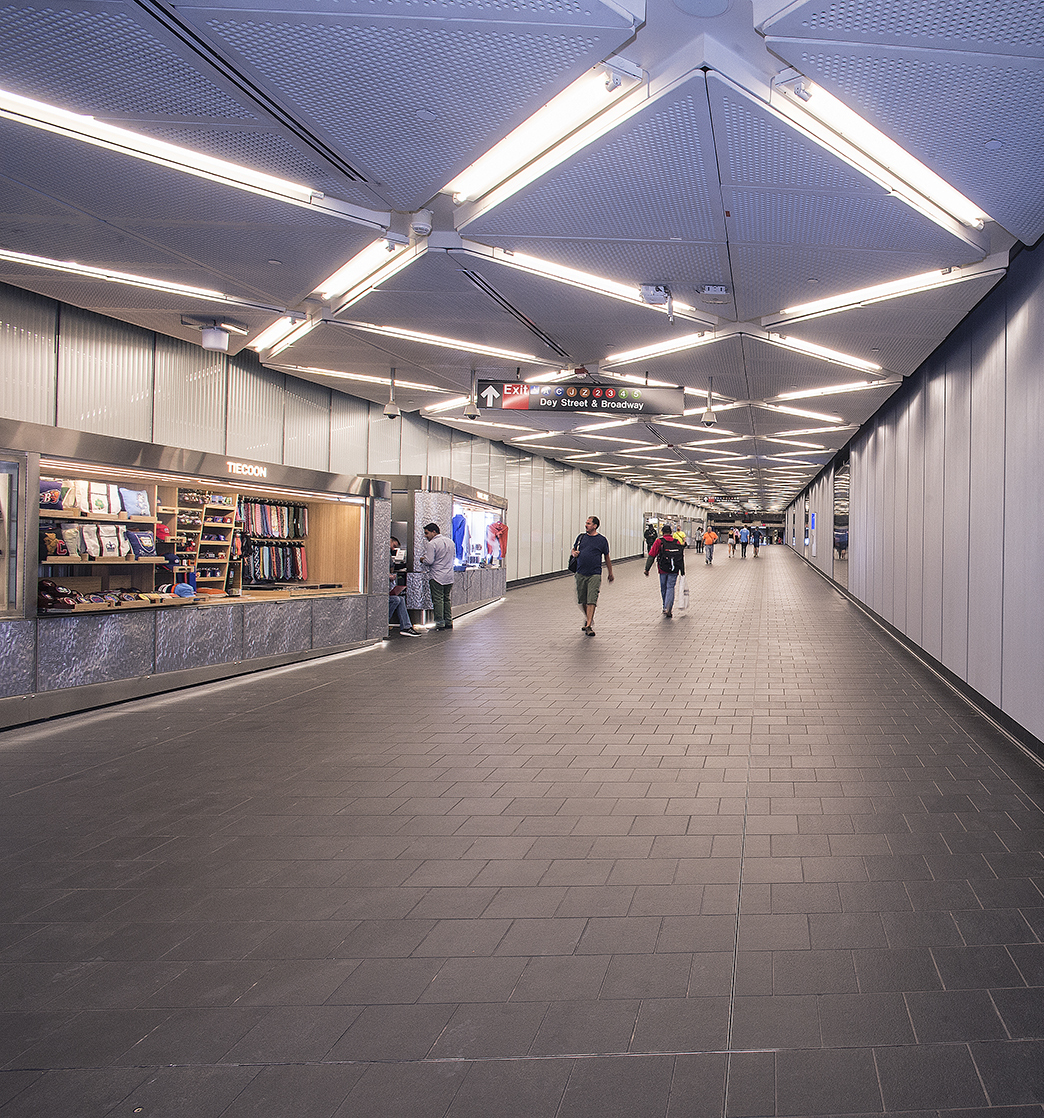
The connection to Cortlandt Street leads to the Dey Street Passageway into the Fulton Center, where passengers can access the Fulton Street station.

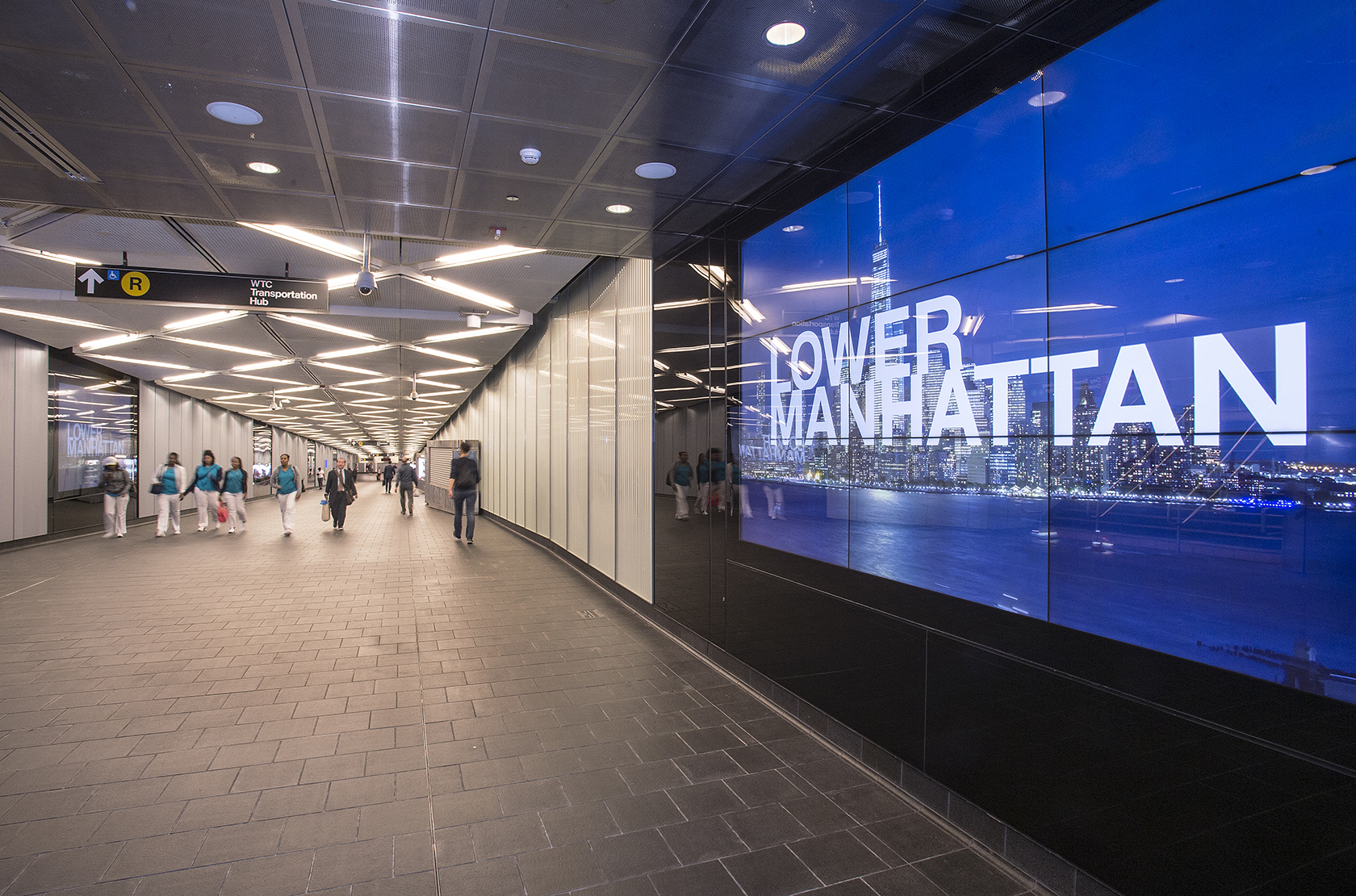
This concourse is free to use, though entering either the PATH station or the New York City Subway stations requires paying the system's respective fare.

The Transportation Hub is designed to connect the PATH subway system to the New York City Subway system. The 1 service, which runs through the Transportation Hub, was reconstructed under this project to run above the PATH mezzanine. The 1 train's rebuilt WTC Cortlandt station, which opened in September 2018, has direct access into the Hub. There is also a direct access to the Chambers Street–World Trade Center/Park Place/Cortlandt Street station complex. The N, R, and W trains' Cortlandt Street–Church Street station also has direct access into the Hub. In addition, the Dey Street Passageway along Dey Street connects the Transportation Hub east to the Fulton Center, providing access to the 2, 3, 4, 5, A, C, E, J, N, R, W, and Z services. A passageway, known as the West Concourse, connects west to Brookfield Place and the Battery Park City Ferry Terminal.

Between September 2003 and April 2004, the Lower Manhattan Development Corporation, the Metropolitan Transportation Authority, the Port Authority, and the New York City Economic Development Corporation conducted a feasibility study of the Lower Manhattan–Jamaica/JFK Transportation Project. It would use the Long Island Rail Road's Atlantic Branch to Downtown Brooklyn and a tunnel to Lower Manhattan to provide faster service to John F. Kennedy International Airport. The project was halted in 2008 before an environmental impact statement could be created.

As of September 2018, current services include:

Station service legend
Stops all times	Stops 24 hours a day
Stops all times except late nights	Stops every day during daytime hours only
Stops late nights only	Stops every day during overnight hours only
Stops weekdays during the day	Stops during weekday daytime hours only
Stops rush hours in the peak direction only	Stops during weekday rush hours in the peak direction only
Time period details
Disabled access	Station is compliant with the Americans with Disabilities Act
↑	Station is compliant with the Americans with Disabilities Act in the indicated direction only
↓	Station is compliant with the Americans with Disabilities Act in the indicated direction only
	Elevator access to mezzanine only

Services	Line	Station	Disabled access	Notes
2; 3	IRT Broadway–Seventh Avenue Line	Park Place	Elevator access to mezzanine only	Part of the Chambers–WTC/Park Place/Cortlandt Street complex
A C	IND Eighth Avenue Line	Chambers Street	Elevator access to mezzanine only	Part of the Chambers–WTC/Park Place/Cortlandt Street complex
E	IND Eighth Avenue Line	World Trade Center	Disabled access	Part of the Chambers–WTC/Park Place/Cortlandt Street complex
N R W	BMT Broadway Line	Cortlandt Street	Disabled access	Part of the Chambers–WTC/Park Place/Cortlandt Street complex
1	IRT Broadway–Seventh Avenue Line	WTC Cortlandt	Disabled access	

The Fulton Street station complex (where the Fulton Center opened in November 2014) is two blocks away to the east and is fully compliant with the Americans with Disabilities Act of 1990. It features the following services:

Services	Line
2; 3	IRT Broadway–Seventh Avenue Line
4; 5	IRT Lexington Avenue Line
A C	IND Eighth Avenue Line
J Z	BMT Nassau Street Line

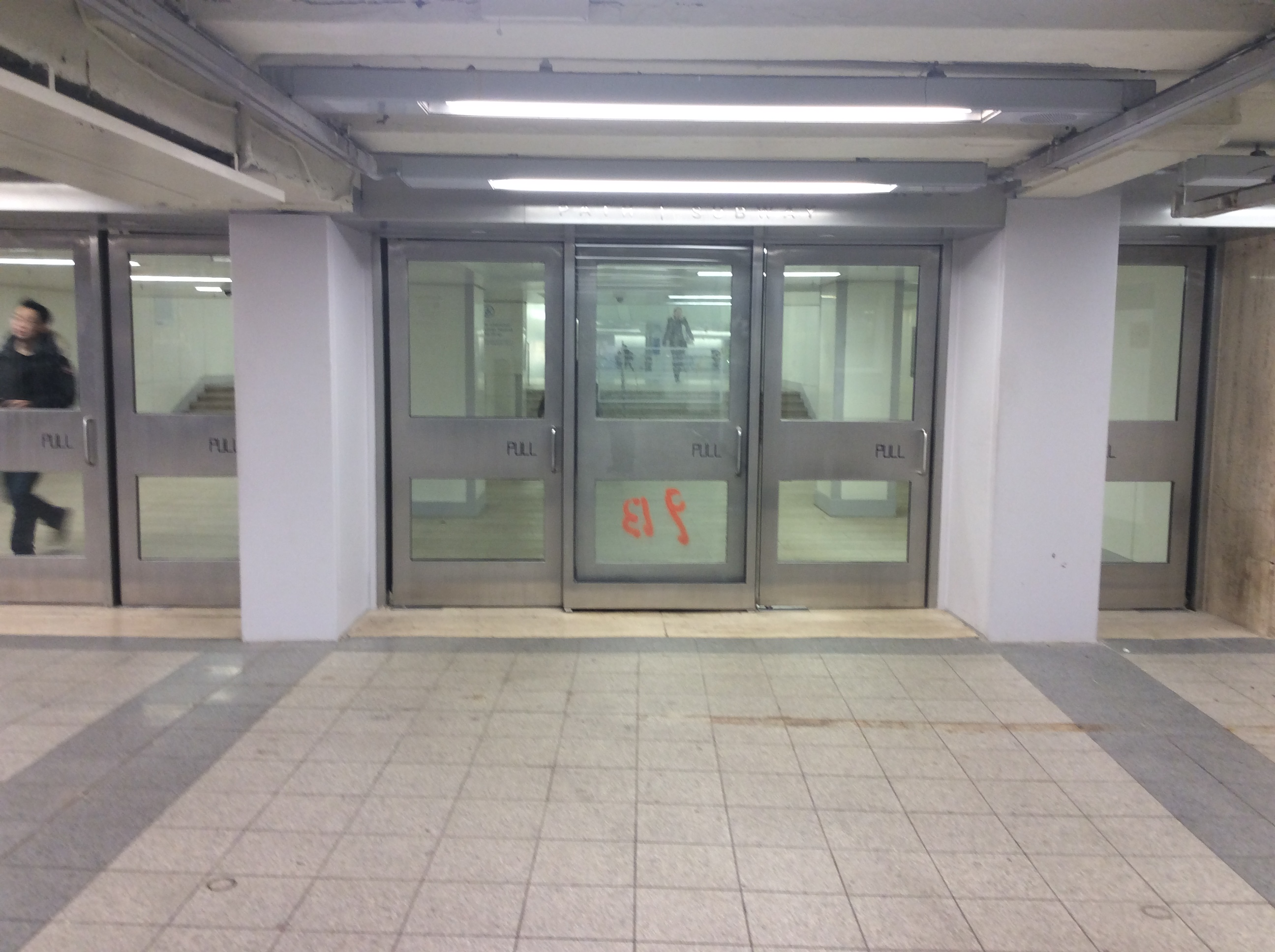
Doorway between PATH and New York City Subway stations, including the back of the preserved door from 9/11 with the words "MATF 1 / 9 13" spray-painted on it. This was a message from Urban Search and Rescue Massachusetts Task Force 1 of Beverly, Massachusetts, who searched the World Trade Center site on September 13, 2001

At the northeast end of the station is the exit to the World Trade Center station of the New York City Subway. The doors and original ADA-accessible ramp, as well as the structure from the first World Trade Center leading into the station, survived the September 11 attacks. The station itself was not damaged, but it was covered by dust and was subsequently closed. The passageway reopened to provide an ADA-connection from the temporary PATH station to the New York City Subway station, but was closed again when the temporary PATH station closed for a reconstruction. The passageway was then covered in plywood for preservation purposes. The renovated entrance, leading to the New York City Subway station from the Oculus headhouse and the Westfield World Trade Center, opened on December 19, 2016. The newly reopened passageway retained its pre-9/11 design, including an original door on display that has the words "MATF 1 / 9 13" spray-painted on it (a message from Urban Search and Rescue Massachusetts Task Force 1 of Beverly, Massachusetts, who searched the World Trade Center site on September 13, 2001). There is a plaque above the spray-painting, explaining the message on the door. PATH was required to preserve the passageway's original design as per Section 106 of the National Historic Preservation Act, as a condition for getting funding to construct the Oculus and new stations. The passageway was not made ADA-accessible again until 2017, as there are twenty-six steps down from the mezzanine to the Oculus headhouse's lobby.

The M55 New York City Bus route runs northbound on Church Street and 6th Avenue to Midtown, and southbound to South Ferry on Broadway.

== Notes ==
External image
- A 1974 photo of the old station
