= New York School of Interior Design =

Interior design school in New York City

Coordinates: 40°46′07″N 73°57′45″W

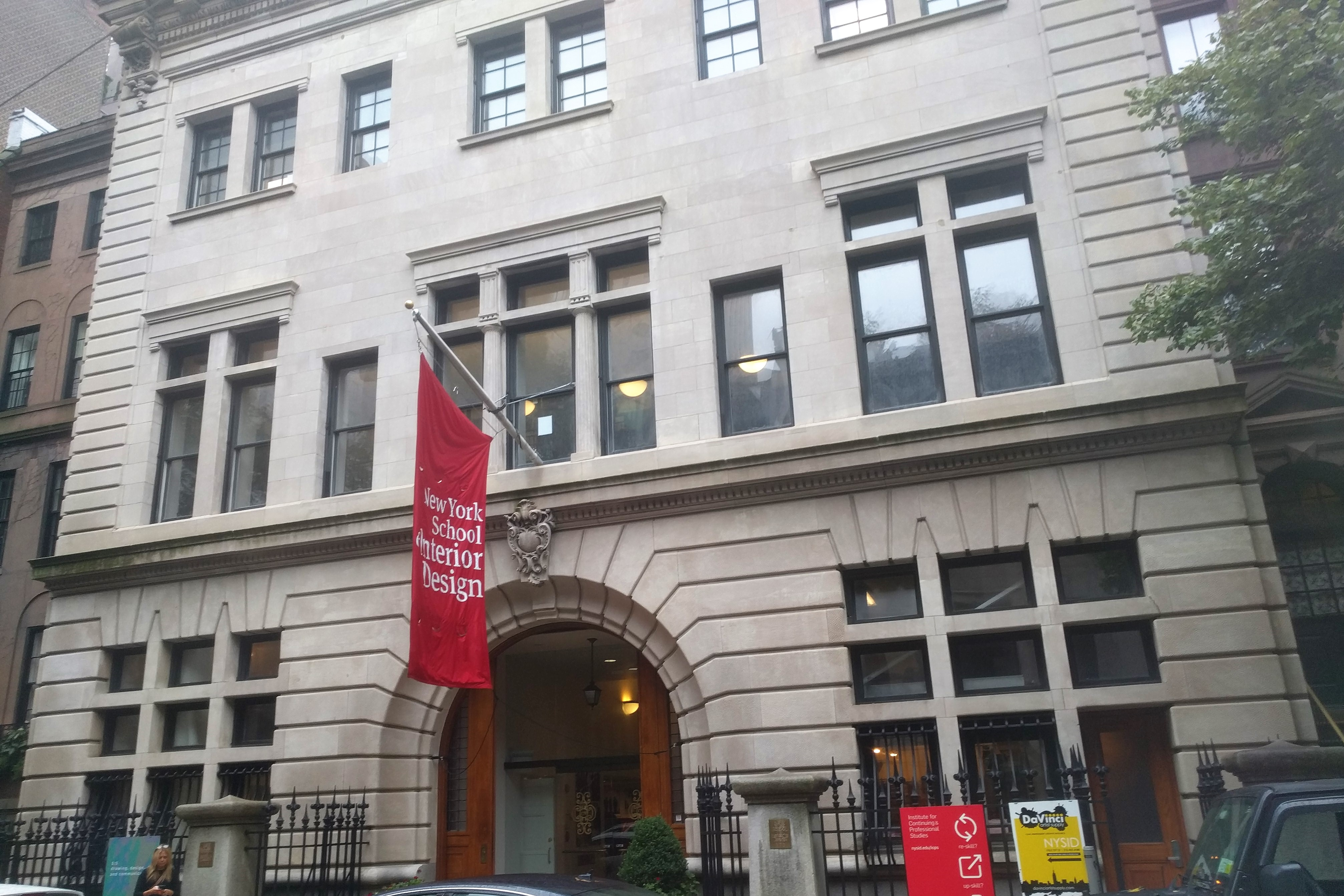
- Established: 1916
- Founder: Sherrill Whiton
- Accreditation: MSCHE
- Affiliations: NASAD
- President: David T. Sprouls
- Vice-president: Ellen Fisher, Jan Chen
- Students: 538
- Undergraduates: 381
- Postgraduates: 157
- Location: New York, New York, 10021, U.S.
- Colors: Red, white, black
- Website: www.nysid.edu

New York School of Interior Design (NYSID) is a private college focused exclusively on interior design and located in New York City. The college offers certificate, three undergraduate, and four master's degree programs.

Founded in 1916, it is located on the Upper East Side of Manhattan in New York City. Located in various buildings on Madison Avenue and in Midtown, NYSID eventually settled into its current location on East 70th Street in 1994. In 2010, the college opened its LEED-Platinum Graduate Center on Park Avenue South and 28th Street.

NYSID is a member of the National Association of Schools of Art & Design (NASAD). Its initial accreditation was in 1996, followed by re-accreditation in 2007 and now 2017.

== History ==
The New York School of Interior Design was founded by Mr. Sherrill Whiton, in 1916, with its location being metropolitan Manhattan, New York. It was chartered by the Board of Regents of the State of New York in 1924, and given degree granting authority in 1976. The current President is David Sprouls and the current Board of Trustees Chairman is Ellen Kravet.

The New York School of Interior Design is guided by the principle that "the successful design of an interior space improves human welfare", and the school also believes that "the interior design profession assumes an important role in ensuring that spaces are beautiful, functional, healthy, safe, and built in a socially and environmentally conscientious way."

== Academics ==
New York School of Interior Design offers certificate, three undergraduate, and four master's degree programs. In the 2016 to 2017 academic year, 98% of NYSID undergraduate students were employed or pursuing further education within six months of graduation and 100% of our graduate students were employed or pursuing further education within six months of graduation.

=== Rankings and accreditation ===
NYSID undergraduate and graduate programs has been ranked in the top five of all interior design programs for the past five consecutive years by DesignIntelligence. The college is also the only accredited graduate program ranked in the top five of the Council for Interior Design Accreditation (CIDA).

The New York School of Interior Design is accredited by the Middle States Commission on Higher Education. It is also an accredited institutional member of the National Association of Schools of Art and Design (NASAD).

The interior design program leading to the Bachelor of Fine Arts in Interior Design (BFA) and the professional-level Master of Fine Arts in Interior Design (MFA-1) is accredited by the Council for Interior Design Accreditation (CIDA). The CIDA-accredited program prepares students for entry-level interior design practice, for advanced study, and to apply for membership in professional interior design organizations. The BFA and professional-level MFA granted by the New York School of Interior Design meets the educational requirement for eligibility to sit for the National Council for Interior Design Qualification Examination (NCIDQ Exam).

== Admission and student demographics ==
NYSID has an enrollment of approximately 600 students. According to the New York School of Interior Design website, in 2018 the college had an enrollment of 538 students in total, with 381 of the students being undergraduate students and 157 of the students being graduate students. About 22% of the college was made up of international students, who came from and represented over 35 different countries. In 2017, the school had 117 faculty and curators with a student:faculty ratio of 10:1. The average class size was approximately 13 students per class and the average student age was approximately 30.

== Media ==
Atelier is NYSID's bi-annual magazine for alumni, friends, and other readers about the people and projects at NYSID. The magazine covers exhibitions, special events, and student work. A regular section that showcases projects from the graduating class. The magazine is published by the college's External Relations Department.

== Notable alumni ==
Notable alumni of the college include:

- Rose Tarlow – Rose Tarlow Melrose House;
