= Iovine =

Iovine (/ˌaɪˈoʊvaɪn/) is a surname. Notable people with the surname include:

- Alessio Iovine (born 1991), Italian footballer
- Antonio Iovine (born 1964), Italian Camorrista
- Jimmy Iovine (born 1953), American record producer
- Julie V. Iovine, American writer
- Vicki Iovine (born 1954), American model and writer
