= Maria Bonghi Jovino =

Italian archaeologist (1931–2025)

- Born: 1931; Naples, Italy
- Died: 23 December 2025 (aged 93–94)
- Title: Professor of Etruscology and Italic Archaeology

Academic work
- Discipline: Archaeology
- Sub-discipline: Etruscology
- Institutions: University of Milan

Maria Bonghi Jovino (1931 – 23 December 2025) was an Italian archaeologist. Bonghi Jovino was Professor of Etruscology and Italic Archaeology at the University of Milan.

== Life and career ==
Bonghi Jovino's work focused on pre-Roman Italy, including the Etruscan civilisation and pre-Roman Campania. She has excavated in Campania and Etruria. A major excavation was at Tarquinia, and she has directed excavations at Pompeii (Regio VI, Insula 5). From 1982 she directed excavations at Piano di Civita, an area of public and religious activity.

Bonghi Jovino died on 23 December 2025.

== Awards and honours ==
Bonghi Jovino was a member of the board of directors of the Istituto Nazionale di Studi Etruschi e Italici, the Accademia di Napoli. She was on the advisory committee of the foundation for Faina Museum of Orvieto and was a corresponding member of the Deutsches Archäologisches Institut. She was made an honorary citizen of Tarquinia in 2008.

She was director of the publication series Capua Preromana.

In 2012, the edited volume Interpretando l'antico was dedicated to her.

== Selected publications ==
=== Art and culture ===
- Breve nota in margine all'Ellenismo Italico, in Mél. J. Heurgon, L'Italie préromaine et la Rome républicaine, Roma 1976.
- L'espansione degli Etruschi in Campania, in Gli Etruschi, catalogo della mostra, Venezia 2000.

=== Architecture ===
- La decorazione architettonica di Capua: peculiarità, itinerarii e modelli, in Deliciae Fictiles, Proceedings of the First International Conference on Central Italic Architectural Terracottas at the Swedish Institute in Rome (1990), Stockholm 1993.
- Affinità e differenze nelle esperienze architettoniche tra Roma e Tarquinia. Qualche riflessione, in AnnFaina XVII, 2010.

=== Pompeii, Capua and pre-Roman Campania ===
- Ricerche a Pompei. L'insula 5 della Regio VI dalle origini al 79 d.C., 2 vol., Roma 1984.
- Gli aspetti controversi della storia di Capua preromana. Ricerche attuali e problemi aperti, in Orizzonti. Rassegna di archeologia, XI, 2010.
- Ripensando Pompei arcaica, in Corollari, Pisa-Roma, 2011.

=== Tarquinia ===
- Funzioni, simboli e potere. I ‘bronzi' del ‘complesso' di Tarquinia, in Kolloquium zum Thema Der Orient und Etrurien, Tübingen giugno 1997 (Hrsg. Friedhelm Prayon und Wolfang Röllig), Roma-Pisa 2000.
- Progettualità e concettualità nel percorso storico di Tarquinia, in Tarquinia e le civiltà del Mediterraneo, Atti del Convegno Internazionale (Milano 22-24 giugno 2004), Milano 2006.
- Tarquinia. Types of Offerings, Etruscan Divinities and Attributes in the Archaeological Record, in Material Aspects of Etruscan Religion. Proceedings of the International Colloquium, Leiden, 29 and 30 May 2008, Leuven 2010.
- Tarquinia. I tempi della scoperta. Realtà e immaginario di un archeologo, Milano 2011.
- The Tarquinia Project: A summary of 25 years of excavation. American Journal of Archaeology 114.1, 161-180. DOI: 10.3764/aja.114.1.161.
- Regarding the epileptic children of Tarquinia. A review. Athenaeum 97(2): 471-476
- L'uomo di mare di Tarquinia. Un sacrificio umano nel contesto abitativo tra riflessione teorica e documentazione archeologica. 2018. Ledizioni.

=== Craft activity ===
- Capua Preromana, Terrecotte votive I, II, Firenze 1965, 1971.
- Una tabella capuana con ratto di Ganimede ed i suoi rapporti con l'arte tarantina, in Hommages à M. Renard III, Coll. Latomus 103, 1968.
- La produzione fittile in Etruria ed i suoi riflessi nell'Italia antica. Questioni cronologiche e correlazioni artistiche, in Atti del Secondo Congresso Internazionale Etrusco, Firenze (1985), Roma 1989.
- Artigiani e botteghe nell'Italia preromana. Appunti e riflessioni per un sistema di analisi; in Artigiani e botteghe nell'Italia preromana, Studi sulla coroplastica di area etrusco-laziale-campana, Roma 1990.
- Santuari e ritualità
- Mini muluvanice-mini turuce. Depositi votivi e sacralità. Dall'analisi del rituale alla lettura interpretativa delle forme di religiosità, in Atti del Convegno “Depositi votivi e culti dell'Italia antica, dall'età arcaica a quella tardo-repubblicana”, Perugia 2000, Lecce 2005.
- I rituali sacri degli Etruschi tra identità e innovazione alla luce di un inedito calderone di impasto dall'area sacra di Tarquinia, in Across Frontiers. Etruscans, Greeks, Phoenicians and Cypriots, Studies in honour of David Ridgway and Francesca Romana Serra Ridgway, London 2006.

=== Classification methods ===
- Aspetti e problemi dell' “Archeologia da campo”. Acquisizioni, prospettive e considerazioni teoretiche e metodologiche, in Proceedings of the XVth International Congresso f Classical Archaeology, Amsterdam 12–17 July 1998, Amsterdam 1999.
- Prospettive di pensiero e prassi archeologica. Appunti in margine alla classificazione e all'interpretazione dei materiali archeologici di Tarquinia, in Studi di protostoria in onore di Renato Peroni, Firenze 2006.
