= Deborah Nevins =

American landscape designer

Deborah Nevins is an American landscape designer. She is the founder and president of Deborah Nevins & Associates and a principal of Nevins & Benito Landscape Architecture.
