= Juca Viana =

Brazilian footballer

Personal information
- Full name: Jovino Soares Viana Júnior
- Date of birth: 21 July 1985 (age 41)
- Place of birth: Brazil
- Height: 1.77 m (5 ft 10 in)
- Position: Midfielder

Senior career*
| Years | Team | Apps | (Gls) |
| 2006 | CA Juventus | 0 | (0) |
| 2006 | Vilnius | 15 | (2) |
| 2007–2011 | PAEC | | |
| 2008 | → ŁKS Łódź (loan) | 12 | (2) |
| 2010 | → América-RN (loan) | 3 | (0) |
| 2012 | América-RP | | |
| 2012 | Rio Branco | | |
| 2013–2014 | Monte Azul | | |
| 2014 | Olímpia | | |
| 2015 | Barra Mansa | | |
| 2015 | Audax | | |
| 2016 | Grêmio Osasco | | |
| 2017–2020 | Monte Azul | | |
- * Club domestic league appearances and goals

Jovino Soares Viana Júnior (born 21 July 1985), known as just Juca Viana, is a Brazilian former professional footballer who played as a midfielder.
