= Jovino Mendoza =

Paraguayan footballer (born 1941)

Jovino Mendoza (born 1941) is a former footballer. He played for most of his career in Club Rubio Ñú, where he won the 1963 2nd division tournament After his years in Rubio Ñú he was signed by Bolivian side Blooming where he became one of the most emblematic players in the 1960s.

In 1972, at the age of 30, he was asked to take over the managerial role at Rubio Ñú, leading the team to the 1972 second division tournament. That year Mendoza was also in charge of the four categories of youth divisions and took all of them to the title as well.

== Titles ==
=== As player ===
Season	Team	Title
1963	(Paraguay) Club Rubio Ñú	Paraguayan 2nd division

=== As coach ===
Season	Team	Title
1972	(Paraguay) Club Rubio Ñú	Paraguayan 2nd division
