= Julie V. Iovine =

American writer on architecture

- Born: Julie Vincenza Iovine; 1955; Washington, D.C.
- Education: Yale University (1977)
- Employer(s): The New York Times; Wall Street Journal
- Known for: Writing about architecture
- Spouse: Alan Hruska

Julie Vincenza Iovine is an American journalist who writes about architecture, and a former magazine editor. She has contributed to The New York Times and the Wall Street Journal, and has written several books.

== Early life and education ==
Iovine was born in Washington, D.C., the daughter of Vincent M. and Julie S. Iovine. Her father was a general surgeon and faculty member of the George Washington University School of Medicine. She has three siblings. She studied Ancient Greek at Yale University, graduating in 1977, and became interested in architecture while living in Athens, Greece.

== Journalism career ==
=== Early controversies ===
In 1987, Iovine wrote an article about her alma mater in the Wall Street Journal, claiming that 25% of Yale's student body was gay or lesbian and that the school had a "reputation as a gay school". The resulting uproar was covered by the Associated Press and reported in newspapers nationwide. Yale president Benno C. Schmidt Jr. denied her assertions and issued a statement calling her article "journalistic drivel". In her defense, Iovine said that her article was based on research, including interviews with 25 students, and extensive reading of the Yale Daily News. She said Schmidt's "reaction has been really extreme. I'm not saying that Yale is overrun by gays, which, by the way, what's wrong with that?"

In 1989, Iovine and Bonnie Bertram (writing in Spy magazine under the pen name "Vincenza Demetz") accused the film director James Toback of sexual harassment, accusations that he denied.

=== The New York Times ===
For 13 years, beginning in 1993, Iovine was a staff writer for The New York Times covering architecture, interior design, and other topics. Her February 2003 Times column, "Turning a Competition into a Public Campaign," discussed the public relations efforts of architects hoping to be selected by the Lower Manhattan Development Corporation to rebuild Lower Manhattan following the September 11 attacks of 2001. Her characterization of competing architects "acting like media-age politicians" was cited by architecture professor Felicity D. Scott in an October 2003 essay entitled Involuntary Prisoners of Architecture.

=== Magazine editor ===
In 2007, Iovine became the executive editor of The Architect's Newspaper. During her tenure, the magazine expanded its online presence, resulting in a significant increase in web traffic and readership. The magazine won several awards and was lauded in 2011 by the Historic Districts Council for its in-depth coverage of "important neighborhood preservation issues...both balanced and accessible". Iovine left the magazine in 2012.

Writing in 2018 of her time at The Architect's Newspaper, Iovine recalled the challenges the profession faced during the years of the Great Recession: "I witnessed what members of this profession are truly made of. As offices closed and shrank...I beheld an extraordinary resilience." Iovine concluded her recollections saying, "As editor of The Architect’s Newspaper during one of the toughest roller-coaster rides in recent memory, I was buckled into a front row seat, and the ride was unforgettable."

=== Wall Street Journal ===
From 2011 until 2018, Iovine wrote about architecture for the Wall Street Journal. Her columns were wide-ranging, covering topics such as the National Veterans Memorial and Museum in Columbus, Ohio, the Zaryadye Park in Moscow, and New York City's reopened World Trade Center Transportation Hub.

In 2014, while delivering a lecture at the University of Michigan's Taubman College of Architecture and Urban Planning, Iovine was interviewed by a reporter for The Michigan Daily to whom she explained her passion for writing: "What drew me to architecture reporting is that it’s so embedded into the real world and you can’t escape it — that’s why I live in New York...[architecture] has to face the real stuff, and any architecture that doesn’t is really missing the point".

== Written works ==
Books and articles authored or co-authored by Iovine include:

- Julie V. Iovine, "The Impeccable Gardener," in American Heritage, June/July 1986.
- Julie V. Iovine (author) and Maria Robleda (photography), Home: Chic Simple (New York: A.A. Knopf, 1993).
- Julie V. Iovine, Wohnen: der Stil der 90er Jahre (1993, German, trans: "Living: the Style of the 90s").
- Julie V. Iovine (introduction), Ezra Stoller (photography), and Jeff Goldberg (photography), Guggenheim Bilbao; Guggenheim New York (New York: Princeton Architectural Press, 1999).
- Julie V. Iovine, Michael Graves: Compact Design Portfolio (San Francisco: Chronicle Books, 2000).
- Julie V. Iovine (co-author), Provoking Magic: Lighting of Ingo Mauer, (New York: Cooper Hewitt Museum, 2007).
- Julie V. Iovine and Todd Merrill, Modern Americana: Studio Furniture From High Craft to High Glam (New York: Rizzoli, 2008).
- Julie V. Iovine (contributor), Civic Action: A Vision for Long Island City (New York: The Noguchi Museum, 2012).
- Julie V. Iovine, New York in Fifty Design Icons (London: Conran Octopus, 2015).

== Personal life ==
In 1980, Iovine married (1st) Peter Demetz, a Yale University professor of German literature. She married (2nd) Kevin Lippert (1959-2022), the founder of the Princeton Architectural Press, with whom she had two sons, Christopher V. Lippert and T. Cooper Lippert. In 2013, she married (3rd) Alan Jay Hruska, a writer and playwright, and a fellow Yale alumnus, who died in 2022.
