= Urban Search and Rescue Massachusetts Task Force 1 =

The Urban Search and Rescue Massachusetts Task Force 1 (2006)

Urban Search and Rescue Massachusetts Task Force 1 or MA-TF1 is a FEMA Urban Search and Rescue Task Force based in Beverly, Massachusetts. MA-TF1 is sponsored by the city of Beverly. The team is made up of 150 people including Police, Fire, EMS and Civilians.

== Deployments ==
As of March 2015 below is a list of MA-TF1's deployments:

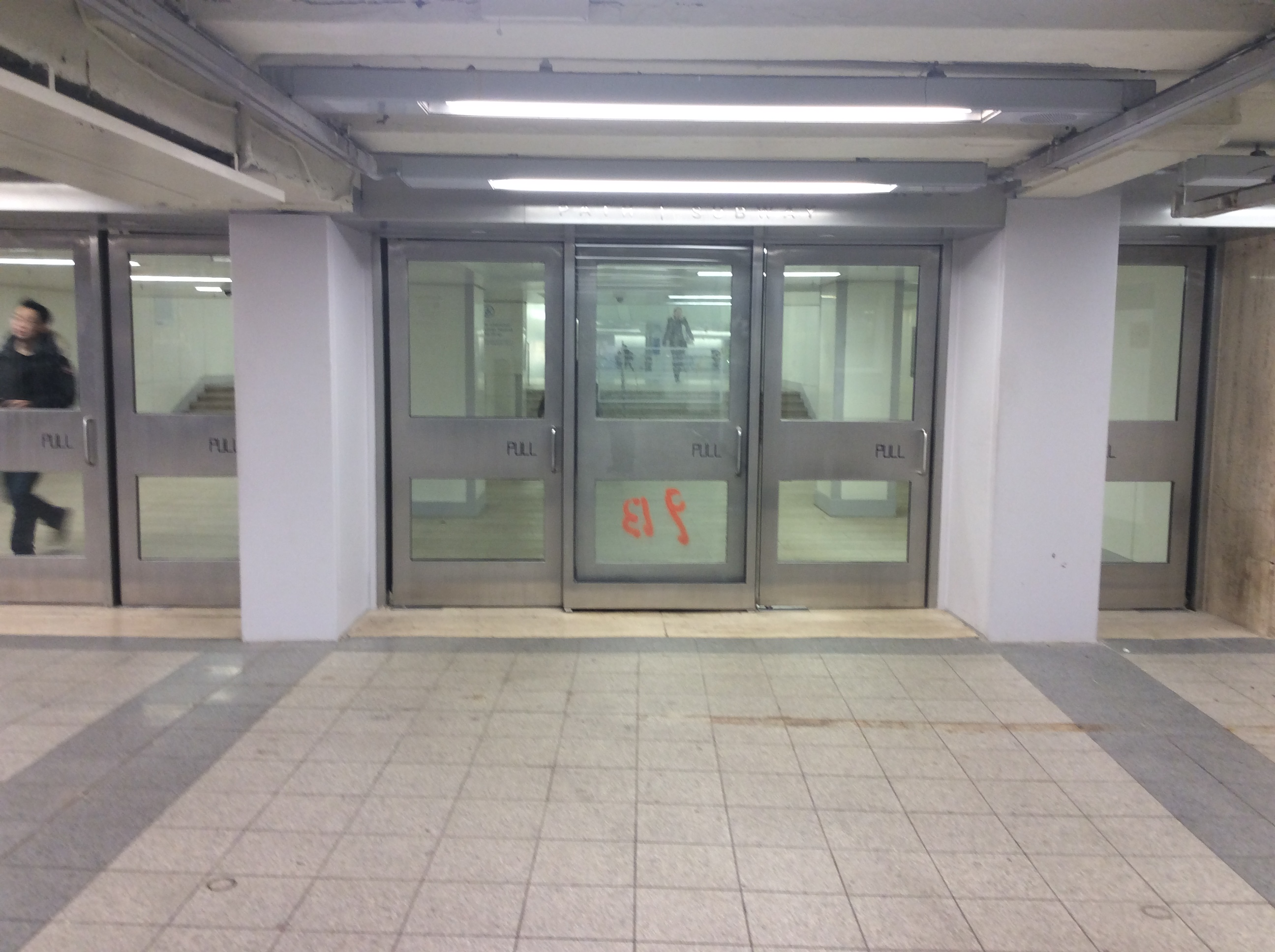
Doorway to the World Tade Center PATH station, including preserved door from 9/11 with the words "MATF 1 / 9 13" spray-painted on it

- Hurricane Luis - August 1995
- Hurricane Marilyn - September 1995
- Hurricane Opal - September 1995
- Meadow Pond Dam - March 1996
- 1996 Summer Olympics - July & August 1996
- Hurricane Georges - September 1998
- Hurricane Floyd - September 1999
- Worcester Cold Storage and Warehouse fire - December 1999
- World Trade Center collapse - September 2001
- American Airlines Flight 587 - November 2001
- Space Shuttle Columbia disaster - February 2003
- Democratic National Convention - July 2004
- Hurricane Katrina - September 2005
- Hurricane Dennis - August 2005
- Hurricane Rita - September 2005
- Hurricane Wilma - September 2006
- Hurricane Ernesto - September 2006
- Danvers Chemical fire - November 2006
- Hurricane Gustav - August 2008
- Flooding in Fargo - March 2009
- Major Flooding - March 2010
- The Greater Springfield tornado - June 2011
- Hurricane Irene - August 2011
- Hurricane Sandy - October 2012
