= Fulton Center =

Transit center and mall in Manhattan, New York

- New York City Subway transit center
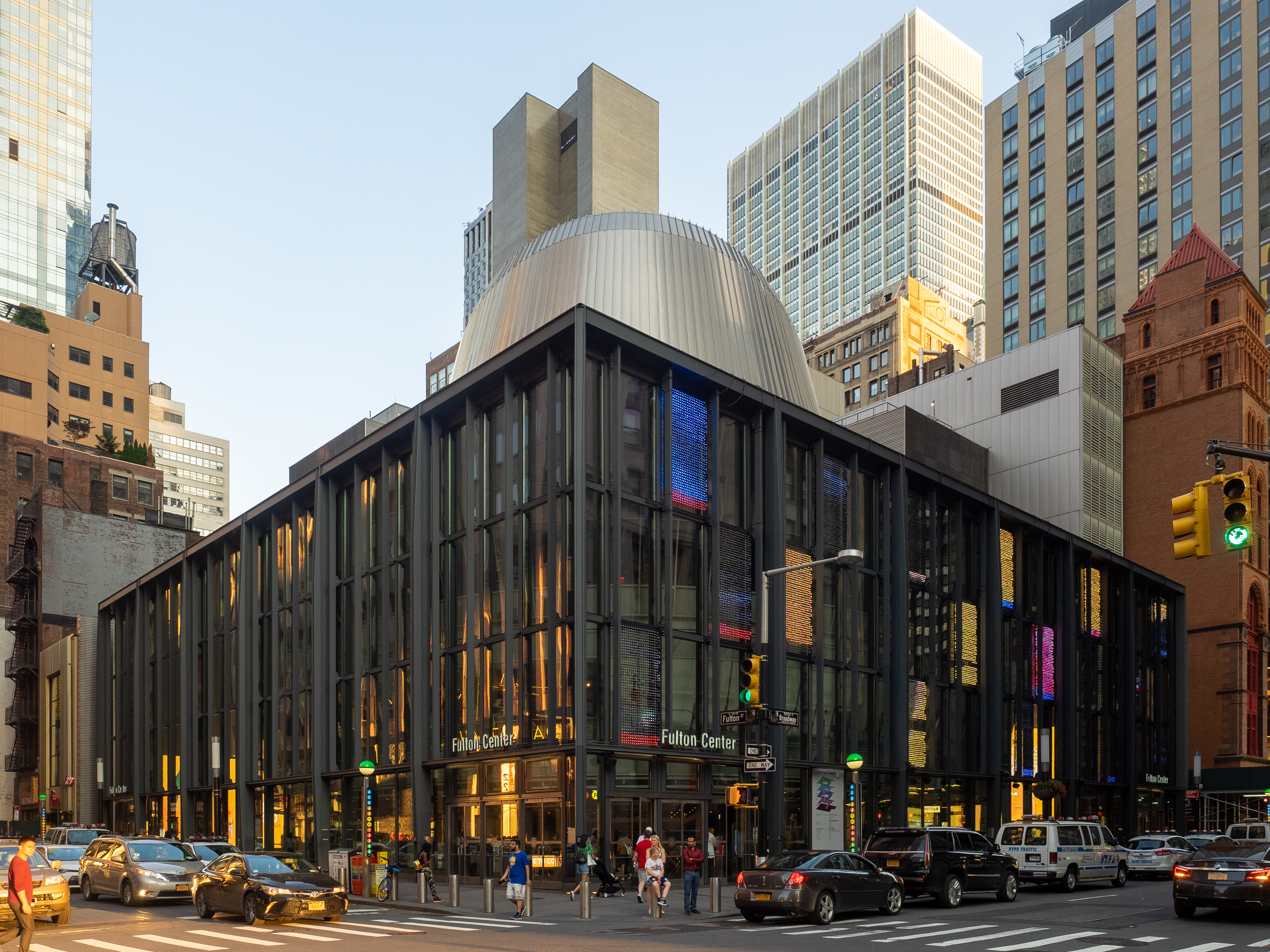
- Fulton Center as seen from the northwest

Station statistics
- Borough: Manhattan
- Coordinates: 40°42′38″N 74°0′32″W
- Division
- Services: At Fulton Street: At Chambers Street–World Trade Center/Park Place/Cortlandt Street:

Other information
- Opened: November 10, 2014; 12 years ago
- Accessible: Yes
Location
Location within New York City Subway
Location within New York City
Location within New York
Street map
Station service legend
Symbol	Description
Stops all times	Stops in station at all times
Stops all times except late nights	Stops all times except late nights
Stops late nights only	Stops late nights only
Stops late nights and weekends	Stops late nights and weekends only
Stops weekdays during the day	Stops weekdays during the day
Stops weekends during the day	Stops weekends during the day
Stops all times except rush hours in the peak direction	Stops all times except rush hours in the peak direction
Stops all times except weekdays in the peak direction	Stops all times except weekdays in the peak direction
Stops daily except rush hours in the peak direction	Stops all times except nights and rush hours in the peak direction
Stops rush hours only	Stops rush hours only
Stops rush hours in the peak direction only	Stops rush hours in the peak direction only
Station closed	Station is closed
(Details about time periods)

Fulton Center Mall
- Location: New York City
- Address: 200 Broadway
- Opened: November 10, 2014
- Architect: Nicholas Grimshaw & Partners, James Carpenter Design Associates
- Num. of stores: 15+
- Floor area: 41,000 square feet (3,800 m^{2})
- Floors: 4
- Website: www.westfield.com/united-states/westfieldworldtradecenter/fulton-center-hours/

Fulton Center is a subway and retail complex centered at the intersection of Fulton Street and Broadway in Lower Manhattan, New York City. The complex was built as part of a $1.4 billion project by the Metropolitan Transportation Authority (MTA), a public agency of the state of New York, to rehabilitate the New York City Subway's Fulton Street station. The work involved constructing new underground passageways and access points into the complex, renovating the constituent stations, and erecting a large station building that doubles as a part of the Westfield World Trade Center mall.

The project, first announced in 2002, was intended to improve access to and connections among the New York City Subway services stopping at the Fulton Street station. Funding for the construction project, which began in 2005, dried up for several years, with no final approved plan and no schedule for completion. Plans for the transit center were revived by the American Recovery and Reinvestment Act of 2009. The project used to be referred to as the Fulton Street Transit Center, but was re-branded the Fulton Center in May 2012 because of a heightened emphasis on retail. The complex officially opened on November 10, 2014, along with the adjacent Dey Street Passageway.

Through the Dey Street Passageway, the complex connects to the PATH's World Trade Center station, as well as to the Chambers Street–World Trade Center/Park Place/Cortlandt Street (2, 3, A, C, E, N, R, and W) and WTC Cortlandt (1) subway stations. The World Trade Center, including the remainder of the Westfield World Trade Center mall, is also accessible via the passageway.

== Components ==
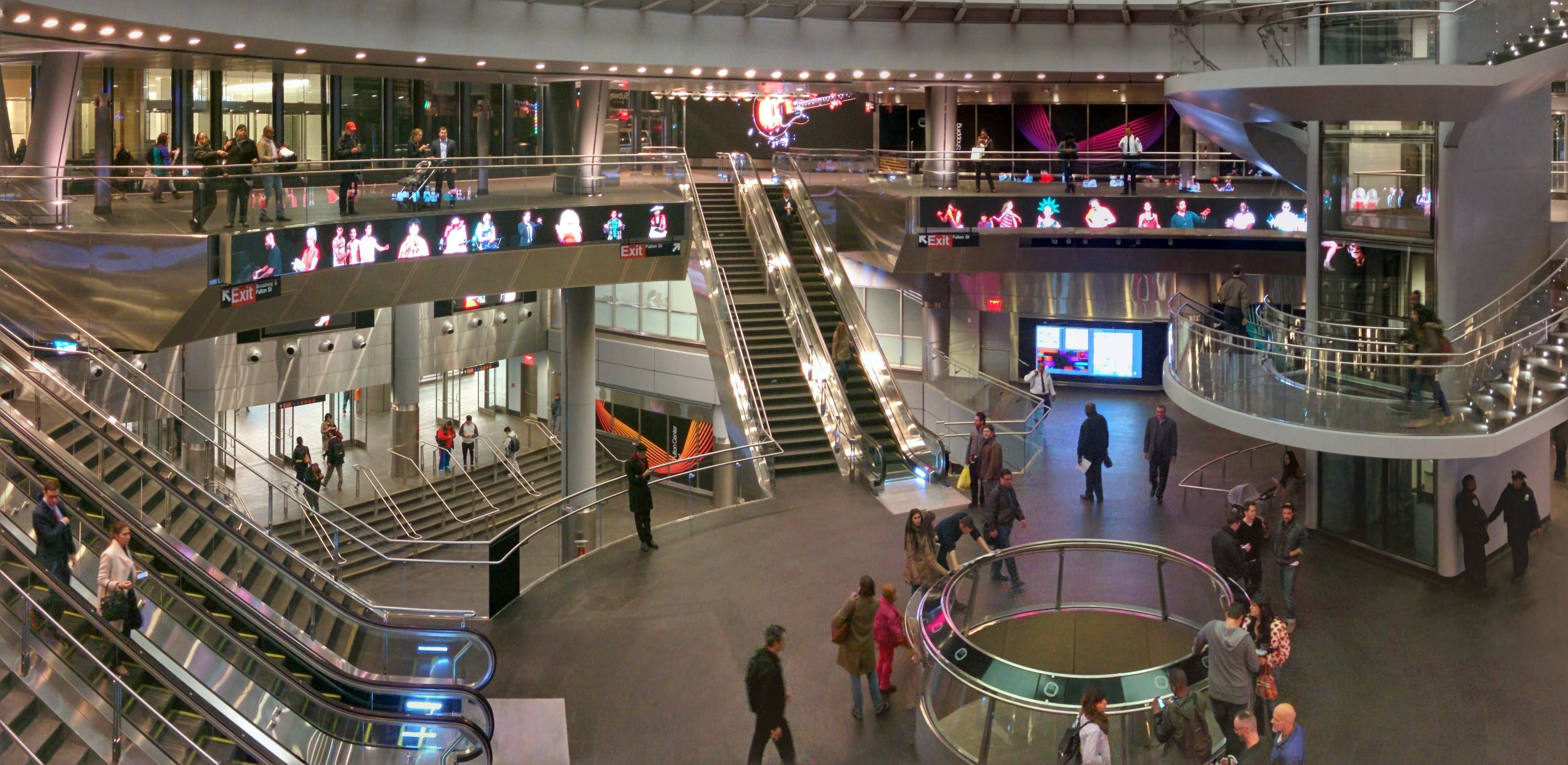
The Fulton Center mezzanine in the Fulton Building, pictured on opening day, November 10, 2014

The Fulton Center features a high-visibility Transit Center with entrances on Broadway between Fulton Street and John Street, and it connects the 2, 3, 4, 5, A, C, E, J, N, R, W, and Z services via the underground Dey Street Passageway running east–west under Dey Street. Ove Arup and Partners served as the prime consultant of the entire project. The Fulton Center cost US$1.4 billion, almost twice the original budget of $750 million.

The major elements of the Fulton Center project included the renovations of the Fulton Street stations along the IRT Broadway–Seventh Avenue Line and the IRT Lexington Avenue Line. During the latter's renovation, new entrances were opened at the corner of Broadway and Maiden Lane for the northbound platform, and at Cortlandt Street and Broadway for the southbound platform. The mezzanine serving the Fulton Street station on the IND Eighth Avenue Line, which previously consisted of several ramps on either side of Nassau Street, was straightened. During these renovations, the entire complex was made ADA-accessible. Ten escalators and fifteen elevators were installed, as well as two ADA accessible public restrooms on the concourse and the street levels.

A new station building, the Fulton Building, was constructed along the east side of Broadway between Fulton and John Streets. The new station required the demolition of the Girard Building and the former Childs Restaurant Building, and incorporates the landmark Corbin Building at the corner of Broadway and John Street. It was nearly canceled at one point, but was saved through funds from the American Recovery and Reinvestment Act of 2009. This portion of the project was part of a master lease to lease over 60,000 square feet of space. A structure with a fritted-glass facade separates the Fulton and Corbin Buildings.

In addition to work on the four linked Fulton Street stations, the Dey Street Passageway, located outside the subway system's paid area, was built under Dey Street. It connected the Fulton Street station complex to the Cortlandt–Church Streets station, serving the N, R, and W trains. A new entrance building was constructed on the southwest corner of Broadway and Dey Street, providing direct access to the Dey Street passageway.

=== Constituent stations ===
The Fulton Center project initially included upgrades to five subway stations:

- Fulton Street station on the 2 and 3 trains on the IRT Broadway–Seventh Avenue Line
- Fulton Street station on the 4 and 5 trains on the IRT Lexington Avenue Line
- Fulton Street station on the A and C trains on the IND Eighth Avenue Line
- Fulton Street station on the J and Z trains on the BMT Nassau Street Line
- Cortlandt Street station on the N, R, and W trains on the BMT Broadway Line

The World Trade Center PATH station, as well as the New York City Subway WTC Cortlandt station on the 1 train on the IRT Broadway–Seventh Avenue Line, are connected to the complex via the World Trade Center Transportation Hub.

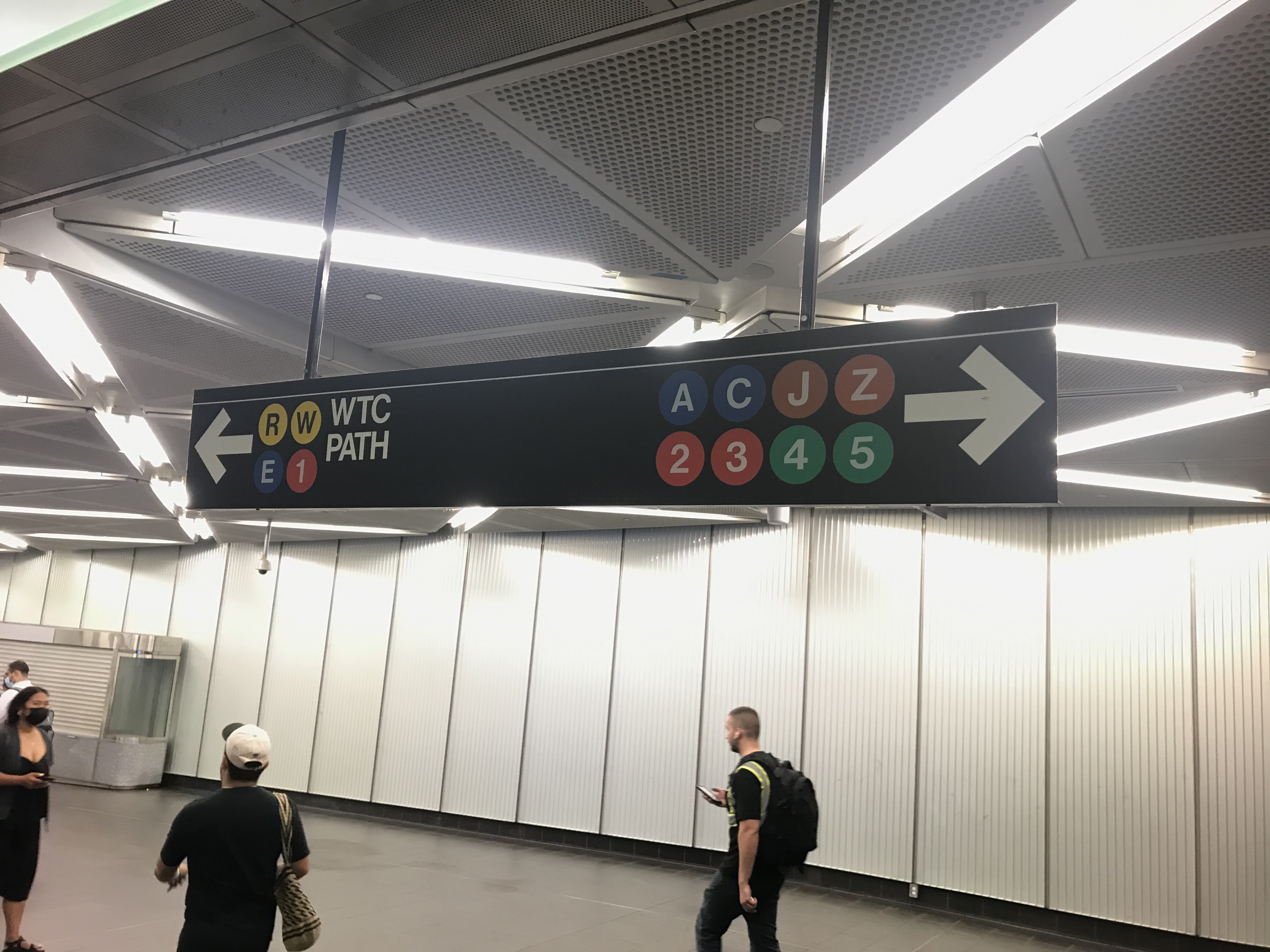
Signs in the Fulton Center (like this one) only show the E, R and W train symbols when pointing toward the Chambers Street/World Trade Center station, as the A, C, 2 and 3 trains serve both station complexes.

Despite the presence of a passageway linking the Fulton Street complex and the Chambers Street/Park Place/Cortlandt Street station, there is no free connection between the two stations. There are still paid transfers to the Fulton Street complex and the two Cortlandt Street stations. From the Fulton Street complex, signs within the passageway indicate the presence of the E, R and W trains (the other services in the Chambers/Park/Cortlandt complex, the A, C, 2 and 3 trains, are already accessible through the Fulton Street station). The connection is still possible via an out-of-system transfer through the WTC Transportation Hub. According to the MTA's Final Environmental Impact Statement, the Dey Street Passageway is intended to provide a seamless connection from the Fulton Center to the WTC Transportation Hub and Brookfield Place (formerly the World Financial Center) without the need to cross Church Street and Broadway, both of which are busy traffic arteries in Lower Manhattan. By keeping it outside of the paid area, it would maximize pedestrian flow.

== Context ==
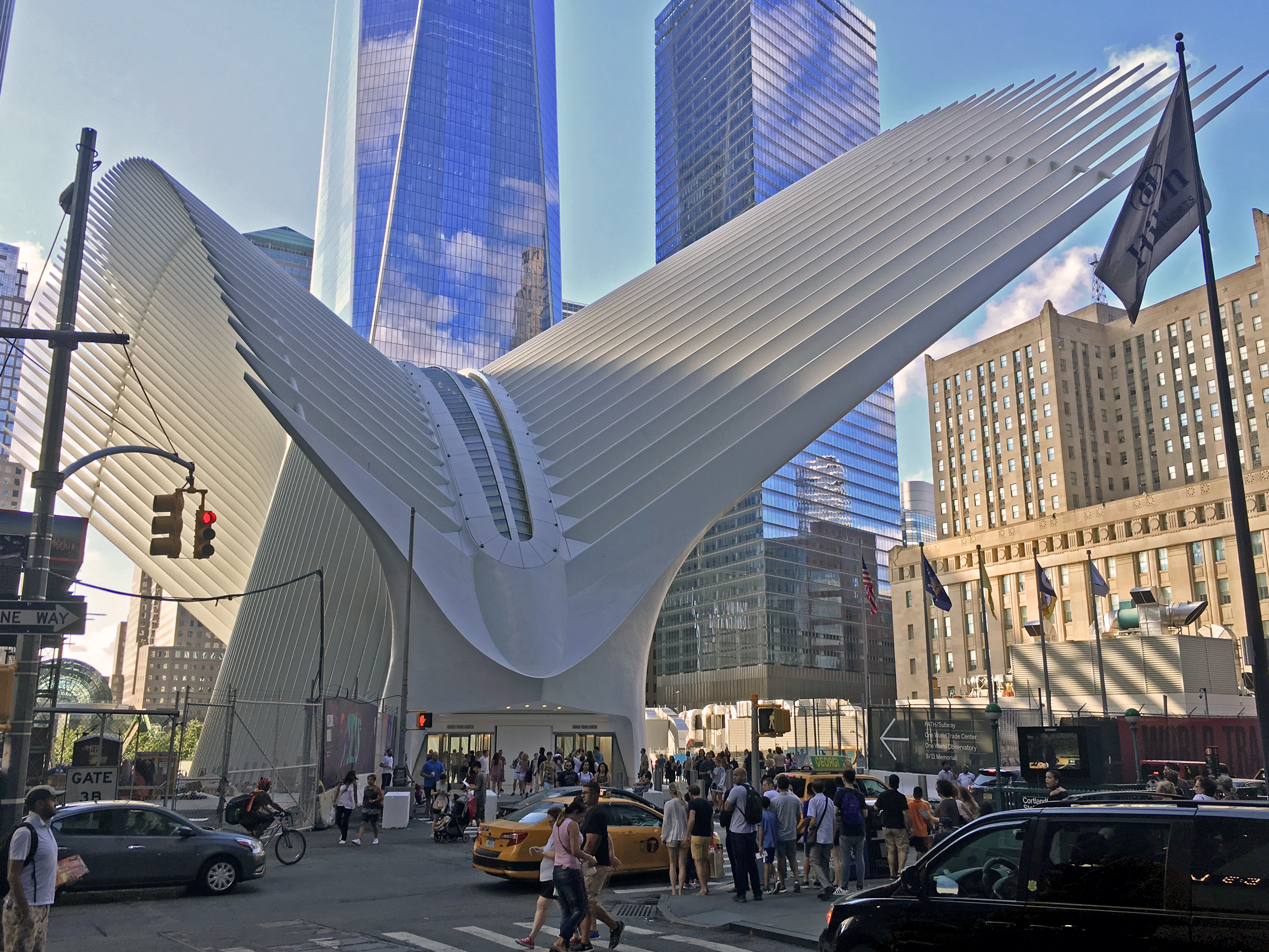
The World Trade Center Transportation Hub, planned for Lower Manhattan in the aftermath of the September 11 attacks, was originally planned to connect with the Fulton Street Transit Center.

=== Need and funding ===
After several pieces of transit infrastructure in Lower Manhattan were destroyed or severely damaged during the September 11, 2001, attacks, officials proposed a $7 billion redesign of transit in the neighborhood. This included the Fulton Street Transit Center, the South Ferry/Whitehall Street terminal further downtown, and the reconstruction of the West Side Highway. The most important of these projects was the Port Authority of New York and New Jersey's proposed terminal for PATH trains at the World Trade Center site, which was destroyed when the World Trade Center collapsed. A preliminary plan for the new terminal included situating it under Church Street, near the site of the former Hudson Terminal and close to the Metropolitan Transportation Authority (MTA)'s Broadway–Nassau/Fulton Street station. The new terminal would also contain direct connections to the subway; previously, World Trade Center had been served by three different subway stations at Cortlandt and Greenwich Streets, at Cortlandt and Church Streets, and at Church Street between Chambers and Vesey Streets. Plans for an integrated transit hub in Lower Manhattan were announced in January 2002. As part of this initiative, money was also to be allocated to study the feasibility of commuter rail service to Lower Manhattan. This would later become the canceled Lower Manhattan–Jamaica/JFK Transportation Project, which would have created a railway line between Lower Manhattan and John F. Kennedy International Airport via the Long Island Rail Road and AirTrain JFK.

As part of the rebuilding process, the Port Authority considered putting the PATH terminal at Broadway and Fulton Street. By April 2002, New York state and city officials notified members of the United States Congress that the project could cost as much as $7.3 billion; at the time, president George W. Bush had pledged only $1.8 billion for transit improvements in Lower Manhattan. The Port Authority ultimately decided to put the PATH terminal near Greenwich Street, two blocks west. The MTA's project to connect the different subway stations at Broadway–Nassau/Fulton Street was approved, despite the fact that the PATH and MTA projects were separate. These stations would instead be connected by a series of underground passageways, which would stretch from the World Financial Center in the west to the Fulton Street Transit Center in the east, spanning over half of Manhattan's width at this point. The Fulton Street Transit Center would also contain a large retail building at Broadway and Fulton Street, serving as the main entrance to that complex. The Fulton Street project would include new passageways, entrances, and elevators to provide transfers between the area's subway stations and increase the capacity of the existing station complex at Broadway–Nassau/Fulton Streets.

In February 2003, New York Governor George Pataki announced a $5 billion plan for rebuilt transit infrastructure at South Ferry, Fulton Street, and the World Trade Center. By April 2003, the MTA had released preliminary plans for a $750 million transit hub at Fulton Street, connecting six subway stations. At the time, the Fulton Street station was extremely hard to navigate, as the four stations in the complex had been built by different companies at different times. The MTA initially contemplated razing the Corbin Building on John Street to make way for the transit center's main building, but the agency had agreed to preserve the building by that October. In December 2003, the Federal Transit Administration allocated a combined $2.85 billion to the three Lower Manhattan transit projects. The PATH station received $1.7 billion in aid, while the Fulton Street Transit Center received $750 million and the South Ferry Terminal received $400 million.

=== Planning and cutbacks ===
Compared with other subway stations' renovations, the Fulton Street Transit Center's funding was secure because the project was financed using money from the September 11 recovery fund. After funding for the transit center had been secured, the project's environmental impact statement was released in 2004. That year, a group of architecture firms, including Nicholas Grimshaw & Partners and Lee Harris Pomeroy Associates, were hired to design the Fulton Street Transit Center. The project was still undergoing revisions as of mid-2005, and was to be completed by October 2005. Construction was set to begin later that year.

Funding problems began in June 2005, when the original plans were cut back. The projected cost of the Fulton Street Transit Center had grown by $75 million, to $825 million. The design had been delayed to May 2006, and the proposed completion date was now December 2008. In March 2006, the land under the Corbin Building was taken for the proposed transit center by eminent domain. A block to the north, the MTA began the process of evicting and relocating 148 store owners near the site of the transit center's main building. The budget of real-estate acquisition also rose from $50 million to $157 million. This cost increase was a key factor in the ballooning costs of the transit center over the next several years.

By May 2006, the budget was nearing $850 million, and the planned completion date was delayed to June 2009. Despite the $45 million budget overrun, the MTA denied that the Fulton Center plan would be curtailed. In November 2006, the MTA announced the creation of a free transfer between the Cortlandt–Church Streets and World Trade Center stations, which would cost $15 million more. By February 2007, the projected cost had risen to $888 million, and the MTA pledged to pay for the $41 million gap with its own money. The completion date was now projected as October 2009.

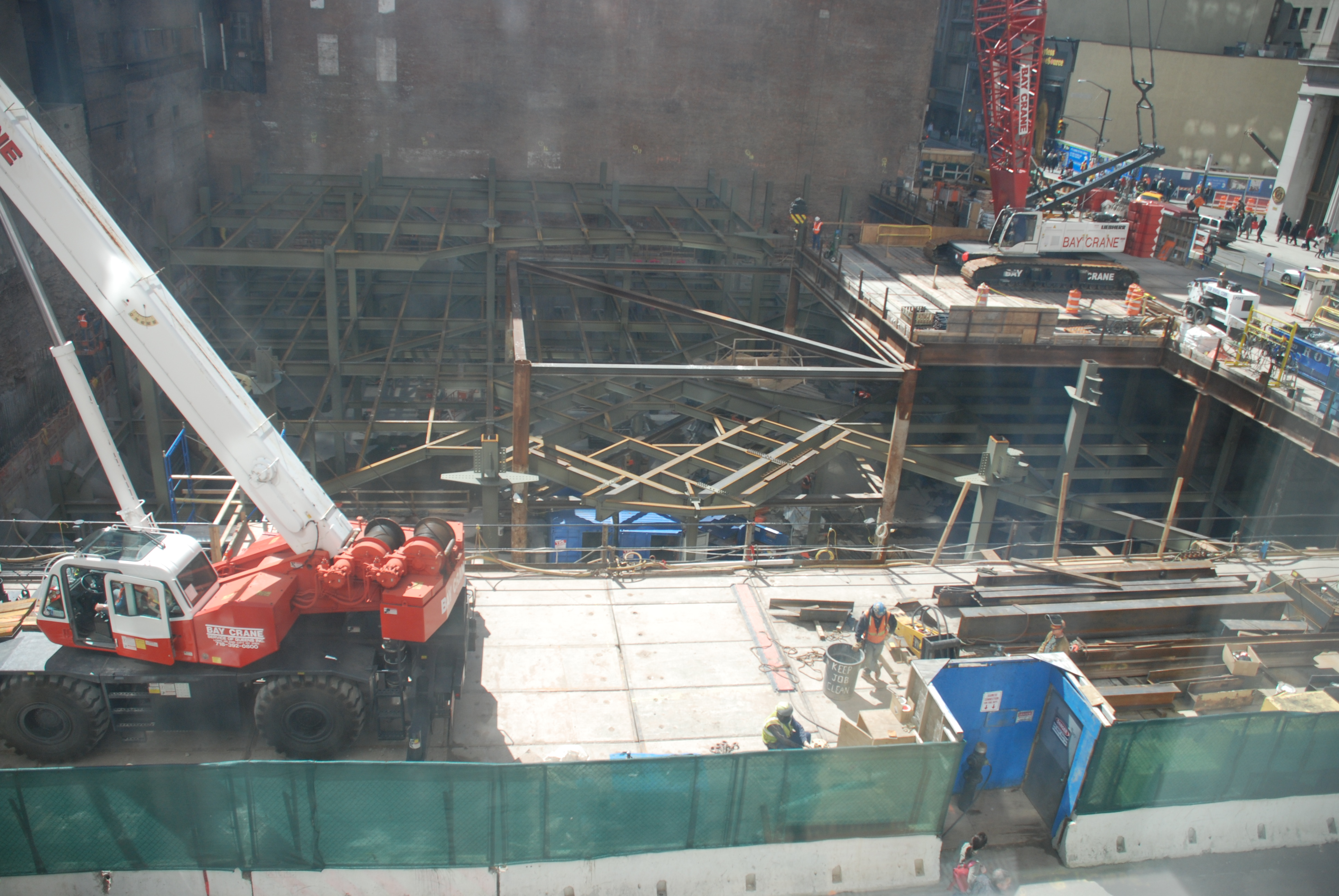
Construction site of the Fulton Center Main Building, seen in March 2010

Meanwhile, the costs of other MTA Capital Construction projects were rising as well. The issue peaked in January 2008, when the MTA announced that three other capital projects (the 7 Subway Extension, the Second Avenue Subway, and East Side Access) were facing a combined cost overrun of $1 billion. To remedy the overrun, plans for the Fulton Center's main building had to be downsized: instead of being a 114-foot-high (35 m) structure with a large dome, the headhouse would now be a simple stainless-steel building with a smaller dome. The project, excluding the main building, was now expected to cost $903 million. The main building would cost another $250 million, if built. The cost overruns were attributed to the fact that the MTA had received a single, $870 million bid for one phase of construction, more than twice the $408 million the MTA had originally set aside for that phase. The date of completion was now set for 2010, and the MTA had ordered a 30-day review of the Fulton Center plan. Around the same time, the neighboring World Trade Center Hub's costs also rose from $2.2 billion to $3.4 billion.

The funding reductions also resulted in several design cutbacks. The free transfer from the Cortlandt–Church Streets and World Trade Center stations was dropped from the plans, but was later restored using MTA funds before being dropped and restored again. The passageway underneath Dey Street was narrowed from 40 to 29 feet (12 to 9 m). The MTA deleted the main building from the plan to reduce costs. In March 2008, the MTA announced that it would spend $295 million on an as-yet-undetermined structure at the location of the main building. One proposal included constructing the main building with a performing arts center, rather than a dome, on top. By this time, the MTA lacked several billion dollars in funding for its 2010–2014 capital spending plan. The MTA did not rule out the possibility of converting almost the entire plot into a public plaza and constructing a simple subway entrance from the plaza. New York Post columnist Steve Cuozzo called the project "The Folly on Fulton Street", a word play on "Fulton's Folly", which was used to describe Robert Fulton's steamboat 200 years before. In June 2008, Chris Ward, executive director of the Port Authority of New York and New Jersey, prepared a report for New York Governor David Paterson regarding the Fulton Street and World Trade Center projects' cost overruns.

Despite the Fulton Street Transit Center's financing deficit, the Federal Transit Administration refused to fund the cost overruns associated with the Fulton Center. However, the MTA used 2009 federal stimulus money to help fund the project. In January 2009, the MTA received $497 million in additional stimulus money, bringing the total cost of the Fulton Street Transit Center to $1.4 billion. As part of an exhibit on the city's major public construction projects, the MTA described the status above ground: "Final details are being worked out for the above ground building. The 115-year-old Corbin Building, at the corner of Broadway and John Street, will be restored and incorporated into the transit center entrance design. The transit center will be a focal point with a vibrant design and a visible portal to downtown and the transit system below".

== Construction ==
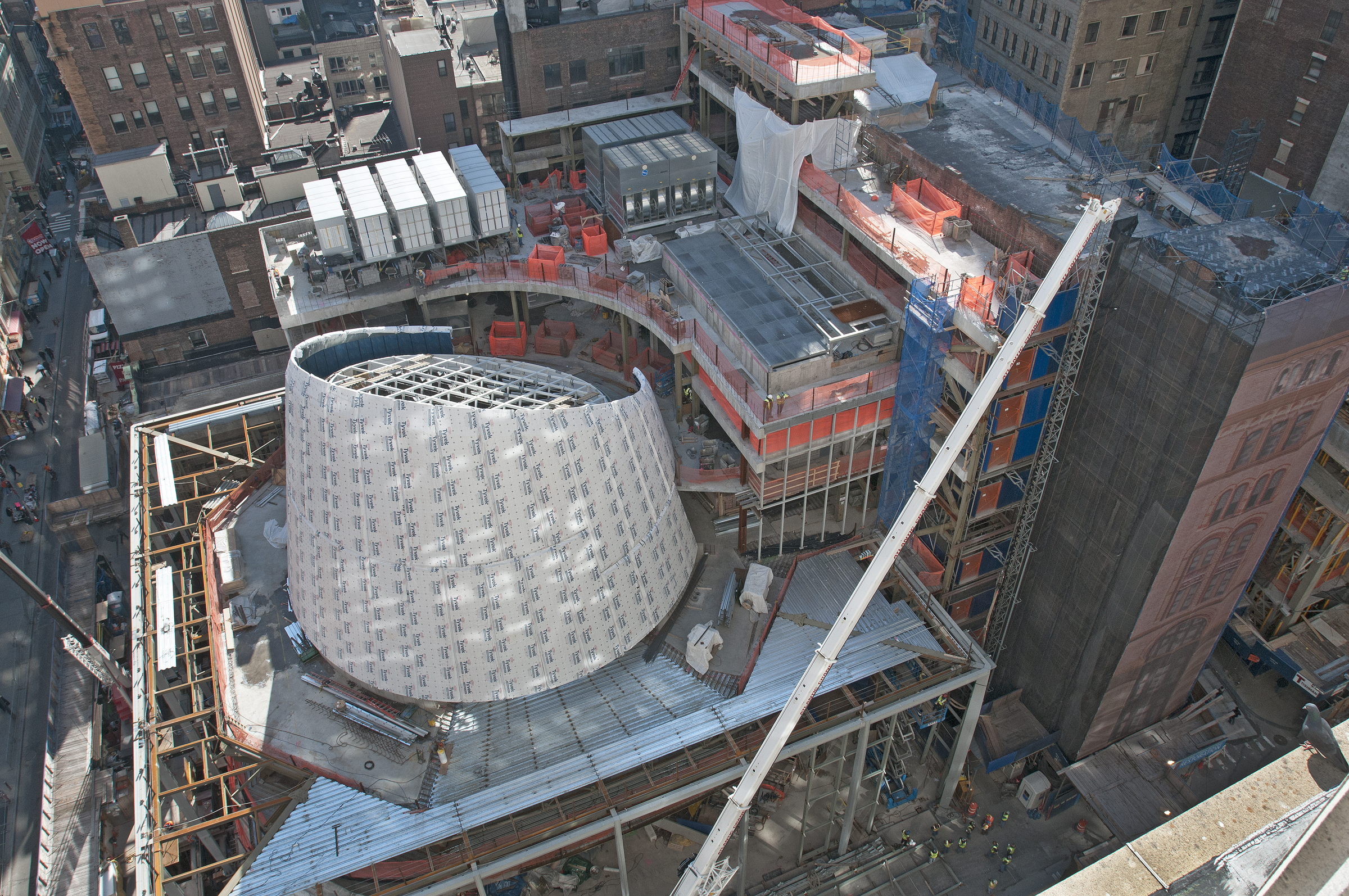
February 2012 construction progress

With funding secured in 2009, MTA Capital Construction released a plan to open various stages of the Fulton Center project. Much of the below-ground connections, such as the IND mezzanine, were to begin construction first. The project rehabilitated two of the four stations in the original station complex. An intricate system of ramps was replaced by two new mezzanines, and new entrances were opened.

=== Station rehabilitation projects ===
The Fulton Center project involved three station rehabilitation projects: the refurbishment of the Seventh Avenue Line's platform at the eastern end of the complex, served by the 2 and 3 trains; the rehabilitation of the Lexington Avenue Line's platforms under Broadway, served by the 4 and 5 trains; and the renovation of Cortlandt–Church Streets, served by the N, R, and W trains. The former two stations had never been renovated, while Cortlandt Street had been renovated in the 1990s before being damaged during the September 11 attacks. The renovations of the Eighth Avenue Line platforms, served by the A and C trains, and the Nassau Street Line platforms, served by the J and Z trains, had been completed in the 1990s.

The first completed project of the Fulton Center, the rehabilitation of the Seventh Avenue Line platform, started in 2005. The narrowness of this platform required the addition of extra circulation elements, such as stairs. This project was completed by November 2006.

Although not part of a rehabilitation, the Cortlandt Street station was first closed in 2005 for the construction of the Dey Street Passageway, the underpass and the construction of the East Bathtub that supports the eastern towers of the new World Trade Center complex that was being rebuilt. With the conclusion of the Dey Street Passageway construction, the uptown platform was opened first, on November 25, 2009. The southbound platform was rehabilitated and reopened on September 6, 2011, with a new underpass, to coincide with the upcoming opening of the National September 11 Memorial & Museum.

The Lexington Avenue Line station at the western end of the complex, serving the 4 and 5 trains, was rehabilitated beginning in 2008. Prior to renovations, there was no direct access to the southern end of the northbound platform, causing overcrowding at this location. The renovation started after the entrances at Maiden Lane (northbound) and Cortlandt Street (southbound) were opened to ameliorate passenger flow during subsequent station rehabilitation. Historical features, such as the tiling, were preserved. The structure was joined by the Fulton Building on the northbound platform, and the Dey Street Headhouse on the southbound platform, when they opened.

=== Entrances ===
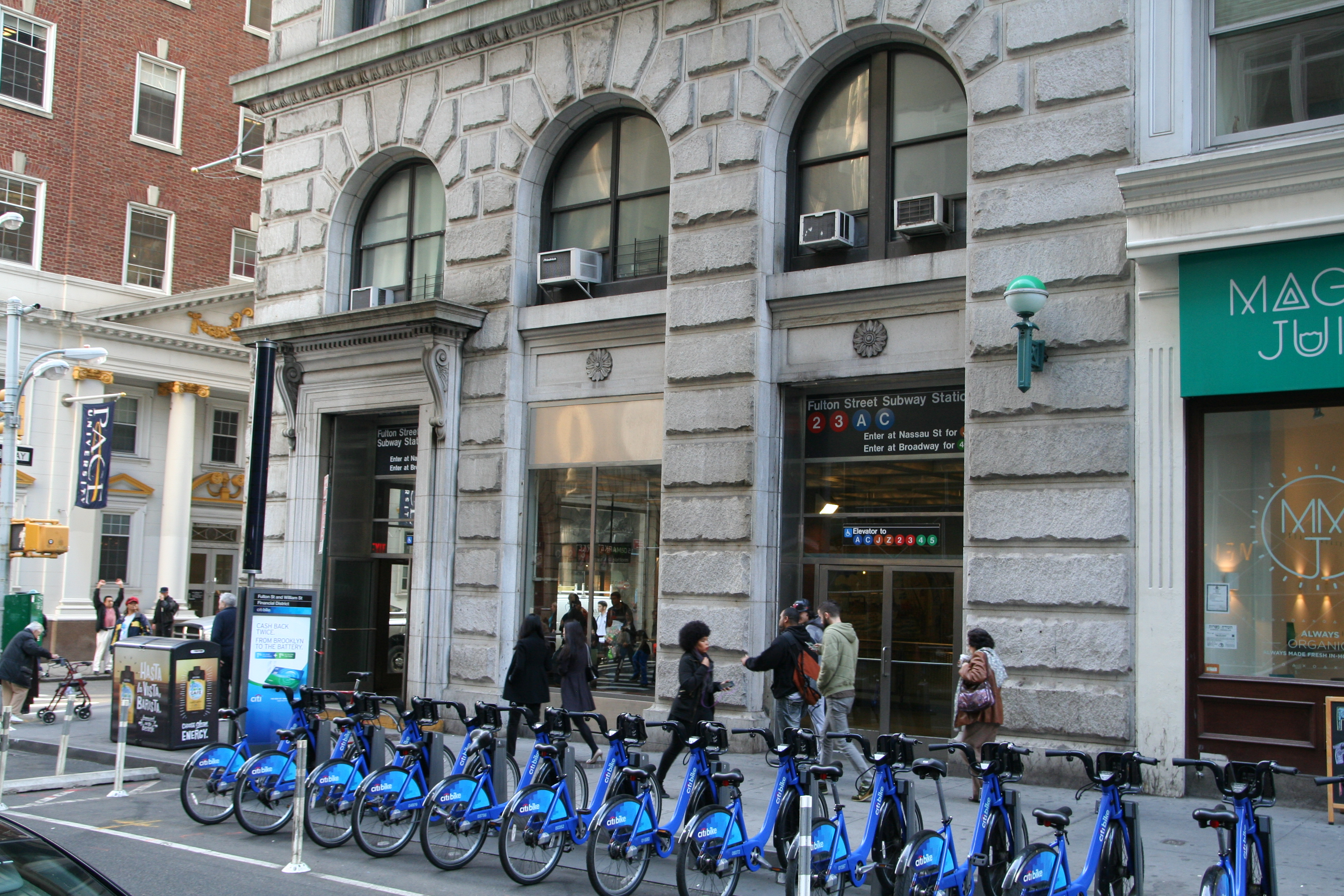
The 135 William Street entrance for the Fulton Street station opened in August 2011, going to the IRT Broadway–Seventh Avenue Line mezzanine.

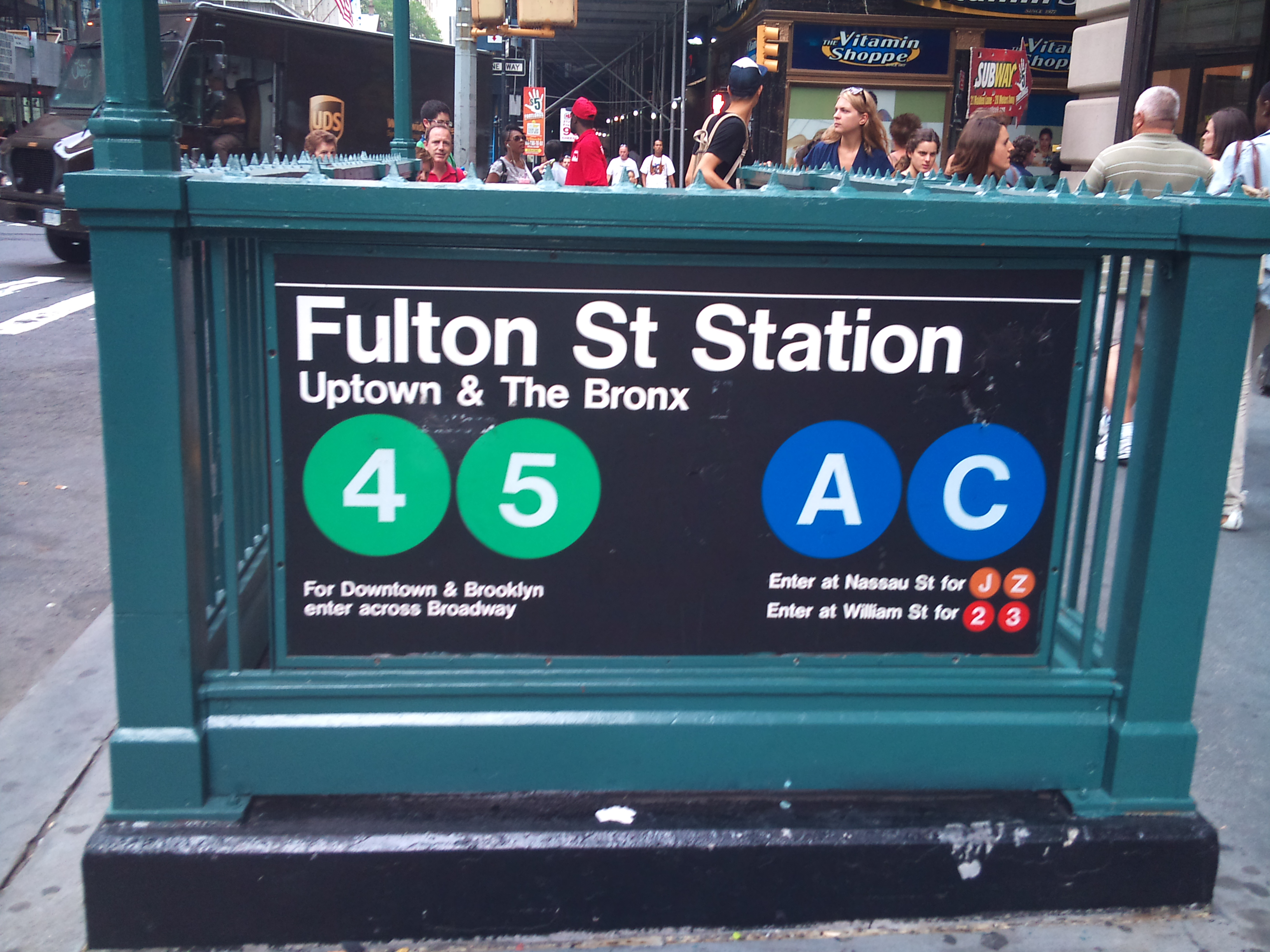
Maiden Lane subway station entrance at Fulton Street, before renovation. Each entrance went to just one platform at the time, as pictured.

As part of the reorganization of the Fulton Street station complex, and to mitigate passenger flow congestion during the construction phases of the Fulton Center project, some new entrances opened and some existing entrances closed. In January 2007, the MTA opened a new entrance on the southeast corner of Maiden Lane and Broadway. Like the John Street entrance, it served chiefly the northbound platform of the Lexington Avenue Line. That month, construction began on creating an analogous entrance on Cortlandt Street, just across the street from Broadway, for the southbound platform. These entrances allowed for the temporary closure of the John Street entrance (northbound platform) and the entrance by Dey Street (southbound platform) during the rehabilitation of the Lexington Avenue Line platforms and Dey Street Passageway-related work.

On August 1, 2011, the entrance at 135 William Street on the eastern side of the complex opened. This was completed in conjunction with the gradual opening of a transfer mezzanine over the IND Eighth Avenue Line platform, serving the A and C trains. A terra-cotta mural and an iron gate from the Hotel McAlpin, both which were originally found in the original transfer passageway, were relocated to the new 135 William Street entrance. An additional entrance at 129 Fulton Street provides an elevator connecting to the Nassau Street Line platform and the Eighth Avenue Line mezzanine.

To allow for advanced Eighth Avenue Line Mezzanine work and the construction of a permanent underpass under the Lexington Avenue Line tunnel under Fulton Street to take place, the subway station entrance at 222 Broadway became permanently closed on October 29, 2011. In its place, a temporary entrance opened midblock between Fulton Street and John Street, inside the main building construction site. This was followed with a major realignment of the transfer passageway between the Eighth Avenue Line and Lexington Avenue Line trains. Related construction work saw the temporary closure of the entrances at Fulton Street, on the northwest (by St. Paul's Chapel) and southwest corners throughout much of 2011. Both were reopened by the first half of 2012. The entrance to Dey Street (195 Broadway), on the southbound platform, was permanently closed on May 1, 2012, for Dey Street Passageway related work and rehabilitation of the southbound platform. It was to be replaced by the Dey Street Headhouse, across Dey Street, when it opened in late September 2012.

At the 129 Fulton Street site and the 150 William Street site are permanent entrances that provide access to the southbound J and Z trains and the 2 and 3 trains, respectively. There is elevator access at the 129 Fulton Street site. Other entrances include the Dey Street Passageway headhouse building (opened 2012) and the Fulton Center main building, or the Fulton Building (opened 2014).

=== IND transfer mezzanine ===
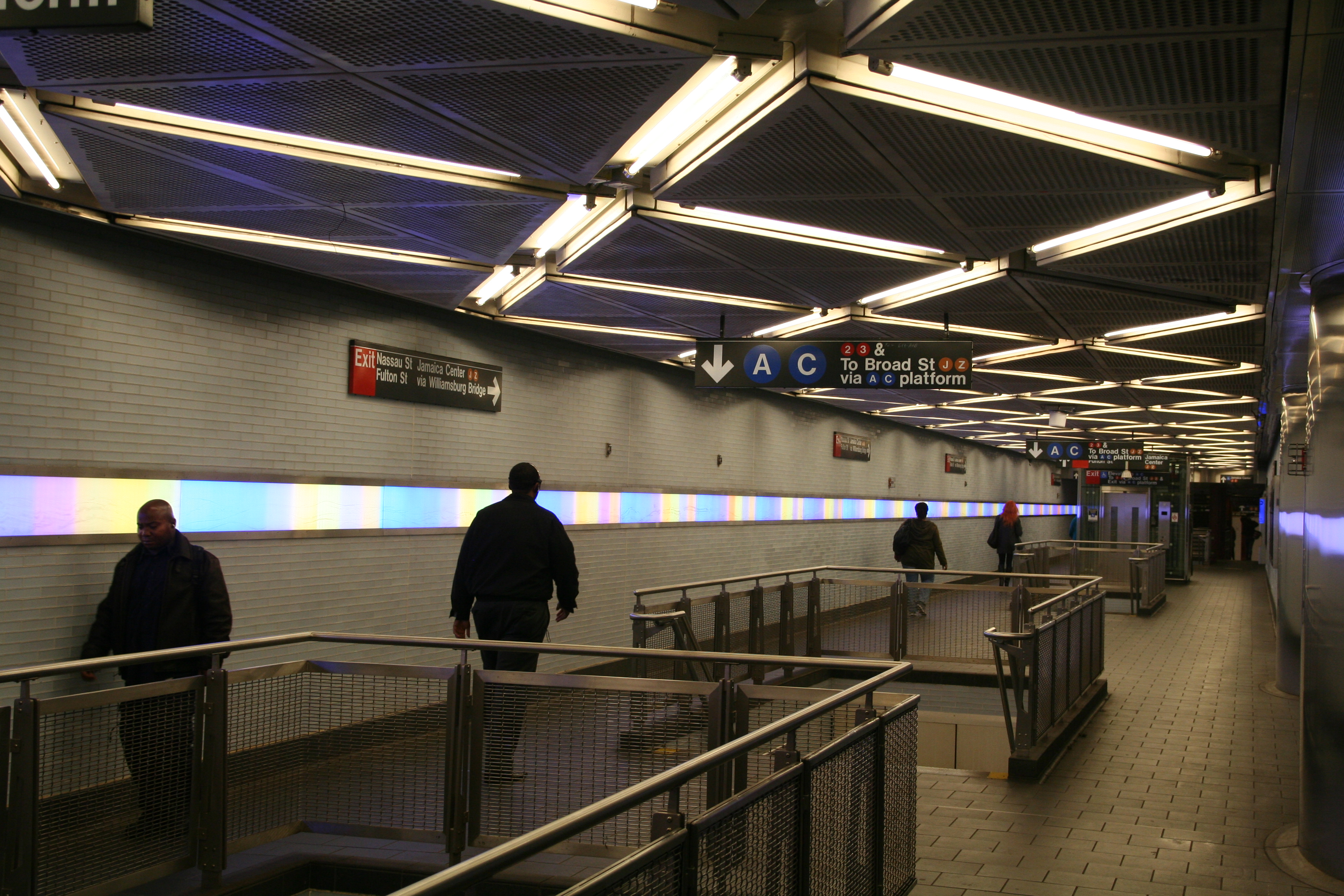
Newly completed passageway in the western half of the IND mezzanine, November 2014

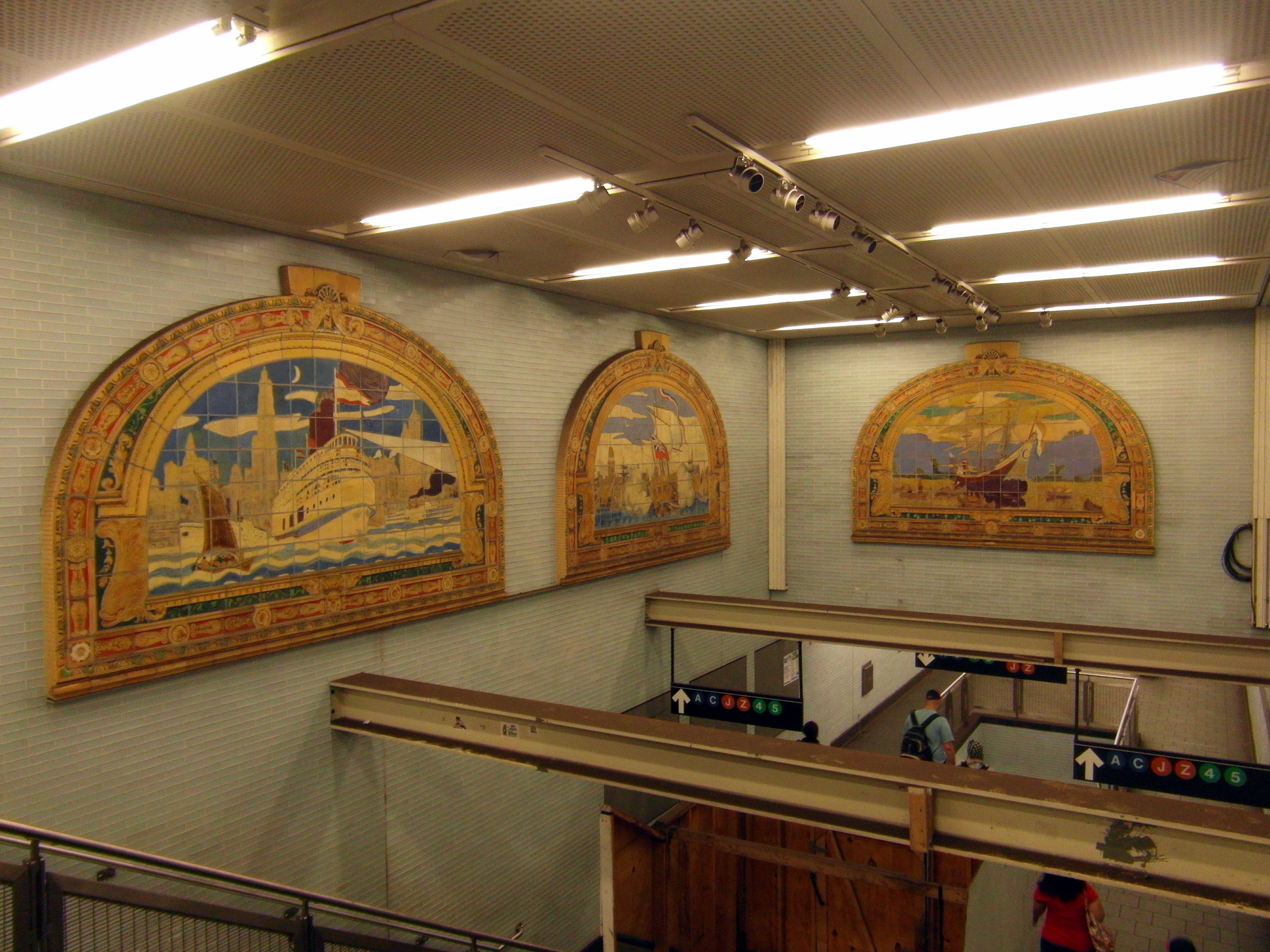
Artwork on the walls of the eastern section the IND transfer mezzanine at the Fulton Center, facing the IND platform

Originally, a network of passageways and ramps loosely connected the various lines with each other, causing congestion during peak hours. The transfer mezzanine, also known as the IND mezzanine, replaced these ramps and made several adjacent entrances redundant. In January 2010, reconstruction of the transfer mezzanine over the Fulton Street IND platform resulted in traffic flow changes. The transfer passageway leading to the Broadway–Seventh Avenue Line platform at Fulton Street had previously been modified. Effectively, all transfers were made through the IND platform, serving the Eighth Avenue Line.

The stacked-staggered configuration of the BMT Nassau Street Line platforms splits the IND mezzanine levels into halves. The eastern half stretches from Nassau Street to William Street, from the southbound Nassau Street Line platform to the Broadway–Seventh Avenue Line platform. Similarly, the western half of the mezzanine stretches from Nassau Street to Broadway, from the northbound Nassau Street Line to the Lexington Avenue Line platforms. Transferring passengers have to use the third-basement-level IND platform to navigate between both halves of the mezzanine, since the Nassau Street Line's platforms bisect the mezzanine on both the first and second basement levels.

The IND mezzanine opened in various phases. Around August 2011, the William Street end of the Eastern mezzanine opened, coinciding with the opening of the 135 William Street entrance. In October 2011, due to a major realignment of the temporary transfer passageway between the Eighth Avenue Line station and the Lexington Avenue Line station, parts of the Western Mezzanine opened as well. The realignment sent passengers through the construction site of the Fulton Building. By January 2012, the Western Mezzanine had opened to the northbound Nassau Street Line platforms. In June 2012, an underpass under the Lexington Avenue Line platforms, traveling approximately under Fulton Street, re-opened and was connected to the Western Mezzanine. With the opening of the new passageway, the older underpass connecting to southbound Lexington Avenue Line platform was simultaneously closed. As a result, the Western Mezzanine was substantially completed. On August 2, 2012, the southbound Nassau Street Line platform was connected to the Eastern Mezzanine. An MTA press release regarded this as the substantial completion of the entire IND mezzanine.

Fulton St to Cortlandt St subway cross-section
Greenwich St	WTC Transportation; Hub (Oculus) / Westfield Shops	Church St		Broadway	Fulton; Center / Westfield; Shops		Nassau St		William St
1	WTC Transportation; Hub (Oculus) / Westfield Shops	R / W		4 / 5	Fulton; Center / Westfield; Shops		J / Z south		mezzanine
underpass	WTC Transportation; Hub (Oculus) / Westfield Shops	underpass	Dey Street Passageway	underpass	Fulton; Center / Westfield; Shops	mezzanine	J / Z north	mezzanine	2 / 3
mezzanine	WTC Transportation; Hub (Oculus) / Westfield Shops				← A / C →
PATH

=== Dey Street headhouse and passageway ===
Temporary transfer passages opened to the Lexington Avenue Line trains from the Eighth Avenue Line Mezzanine in October 2011, in conjunction with the closing of the entrance across the street on Fulton Street. In June 2012, this passageway was again replaced, this time by a permanent passageway underneath Fulton Street that adjoined the western Eighth Avenue Line mezzanine directly. The original temporary transfer passageway was part of an underground concourse connecting the Fulton Center and the Dey Street Passageway, and also served a crossunder for the two platforms.

The Dey Street Passageway headhouse opened on October 8, 2012. It serves as an entrance for the southbound Lexington Avenue Line trains, and as the main access point for the long-anticipated Dey Street Passageway.

Dey Street headhouse and passageway construction

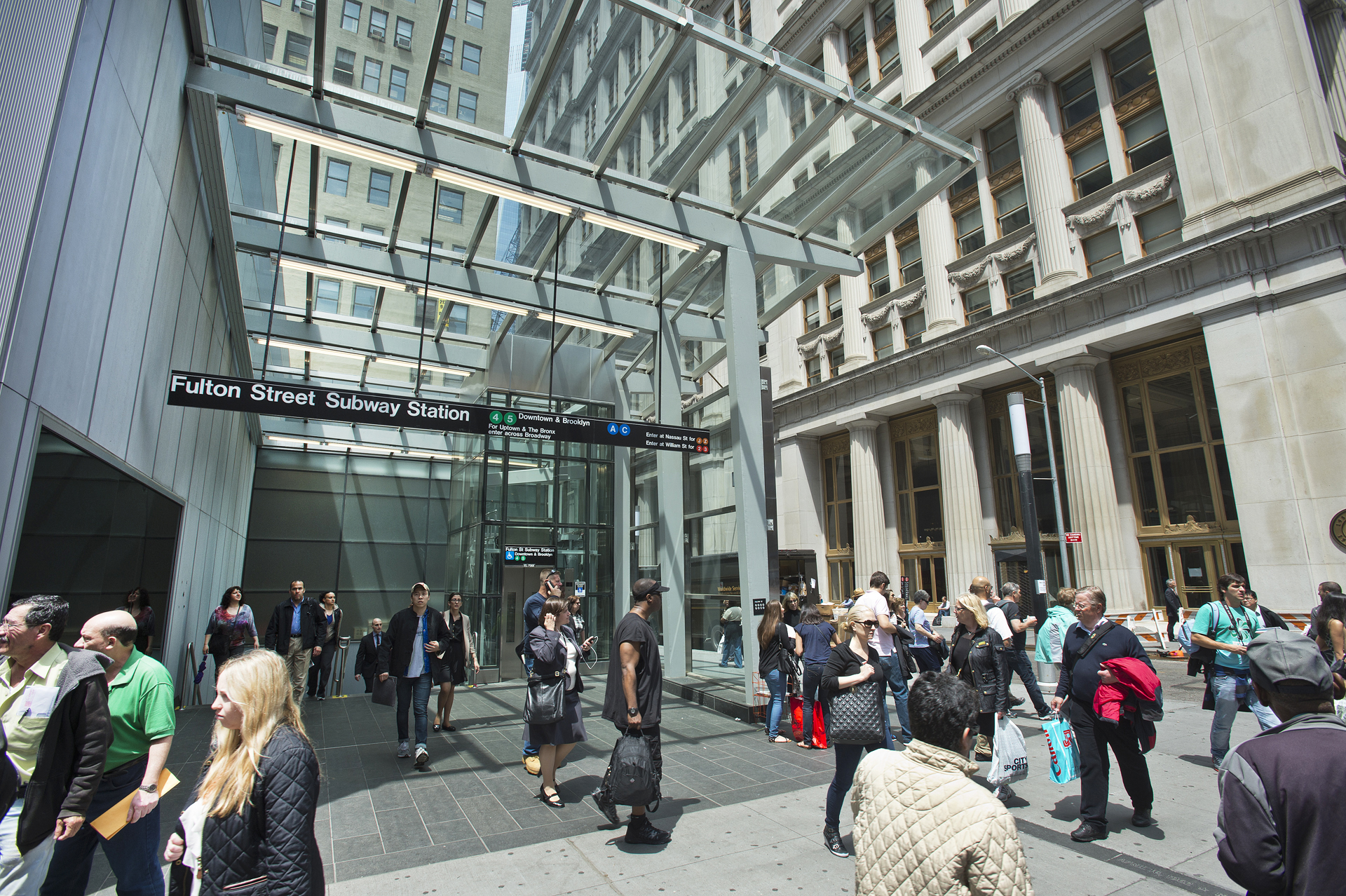
The Dey Street Headhouse, located at the southwest corner of Dey Street and Broadway

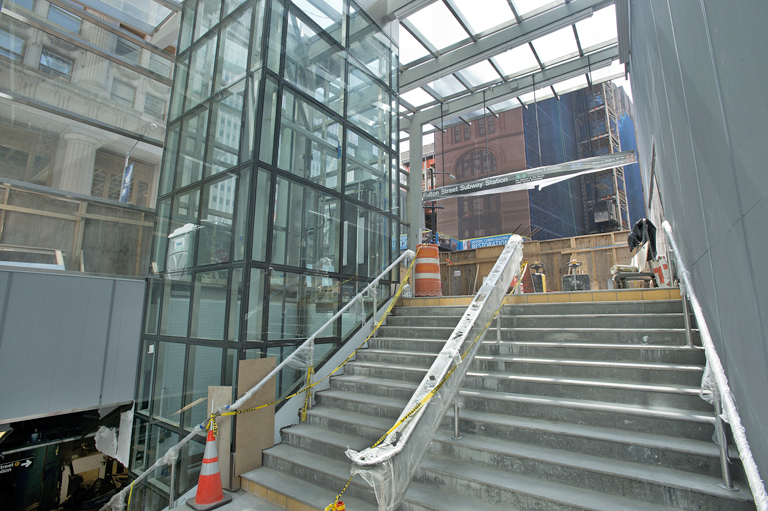
Construction on the Dey Street entrance

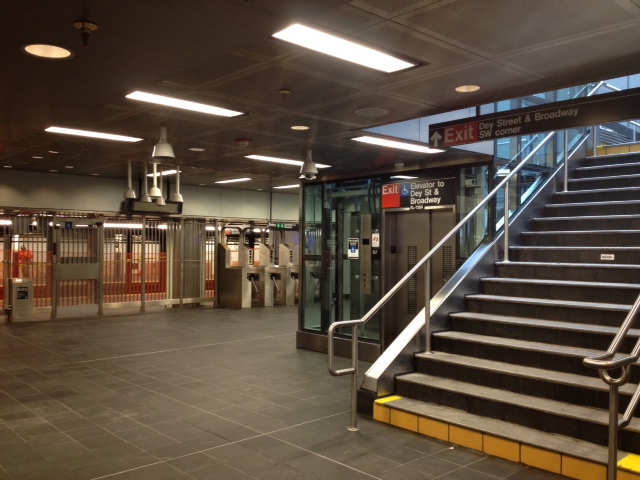
Inside the Dey Street entrance

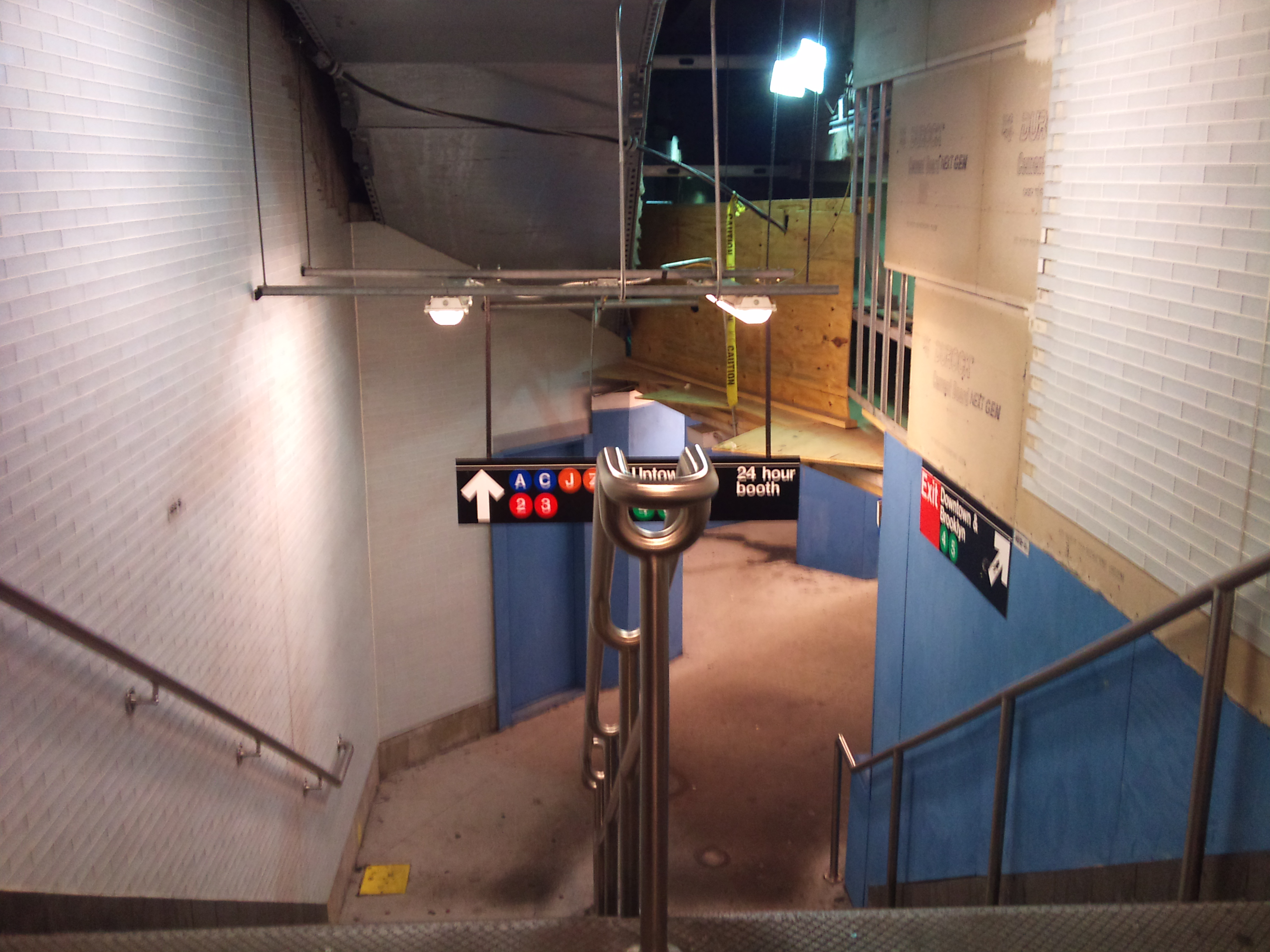
Temporary transfer passageway from southbound Lexington Avenue Line platform. This was closed from June 2012, but later reopened as the Lexington Avenue Line underpass, connecting the Dey Street Passageway with the Fulton Building

=== Fulton Building ===
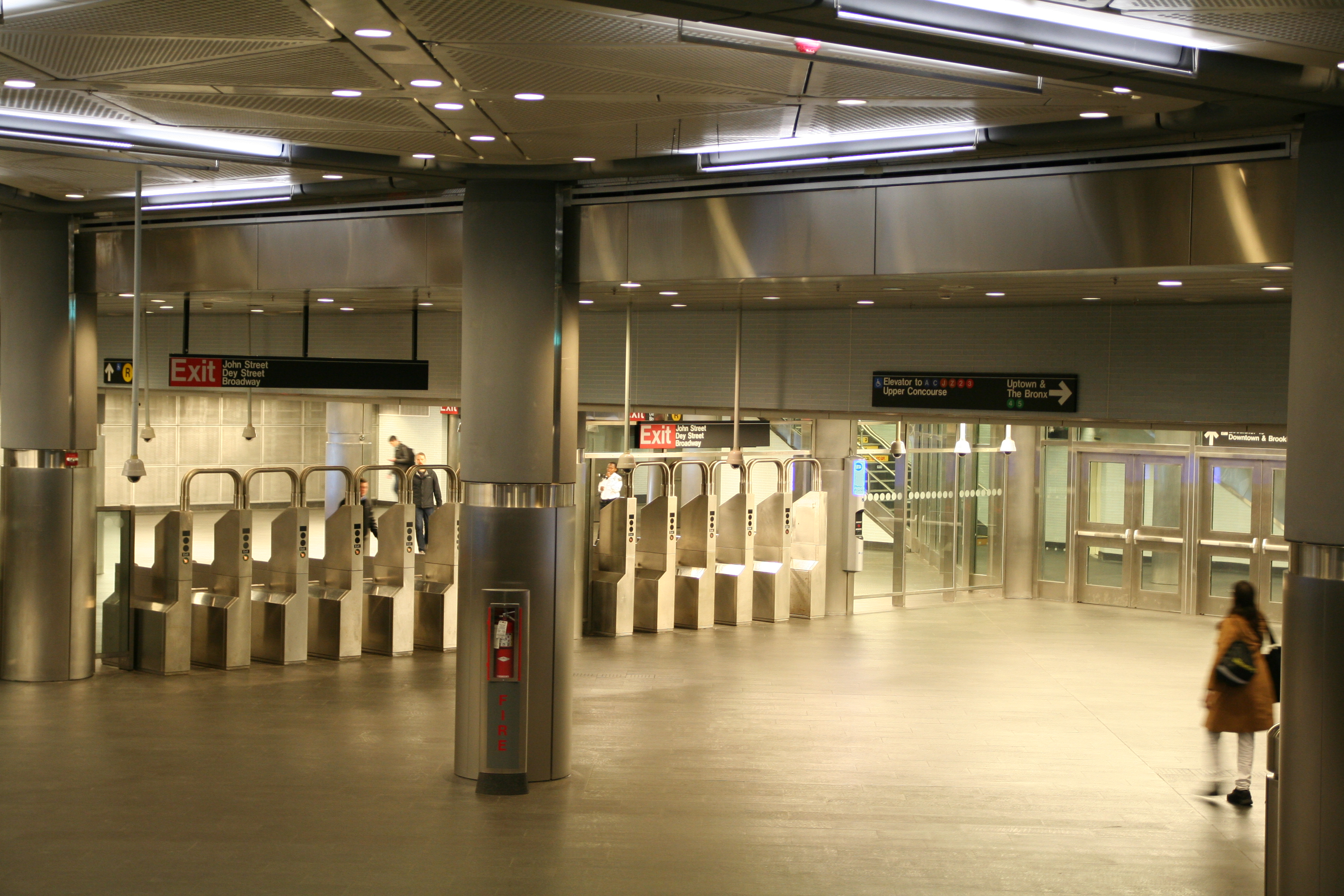
Fare control area

The main building for the Fulton Center project, referred to as the Fulton Building by the MTA in its Requests for Proposals in August 2012, is a three-story building clad in glass, with an oculus atop that draws natural light into the main building and the uptown platform of the Lexington Avenue Line station. It is designed by Nicholas Grimshaw and James Carpenter Design Associates. Its construction replaced four buildings along the eastern side of Broadway, which were demolished during 2007.

The Fulton Building was nearly canceled in 2009 due to increasing costs, but was restored after $497 million in stimulus funding was allocated toward the Fulton Street Transit Center. The foundations of the main transit complex was completed in August 2010. Full scale superstructure work on the main building began in January 2011, and steel work concluded in October 2011. In November 2014, the Fulton Building opened to the public.

==== Sky Reflector-Net ====
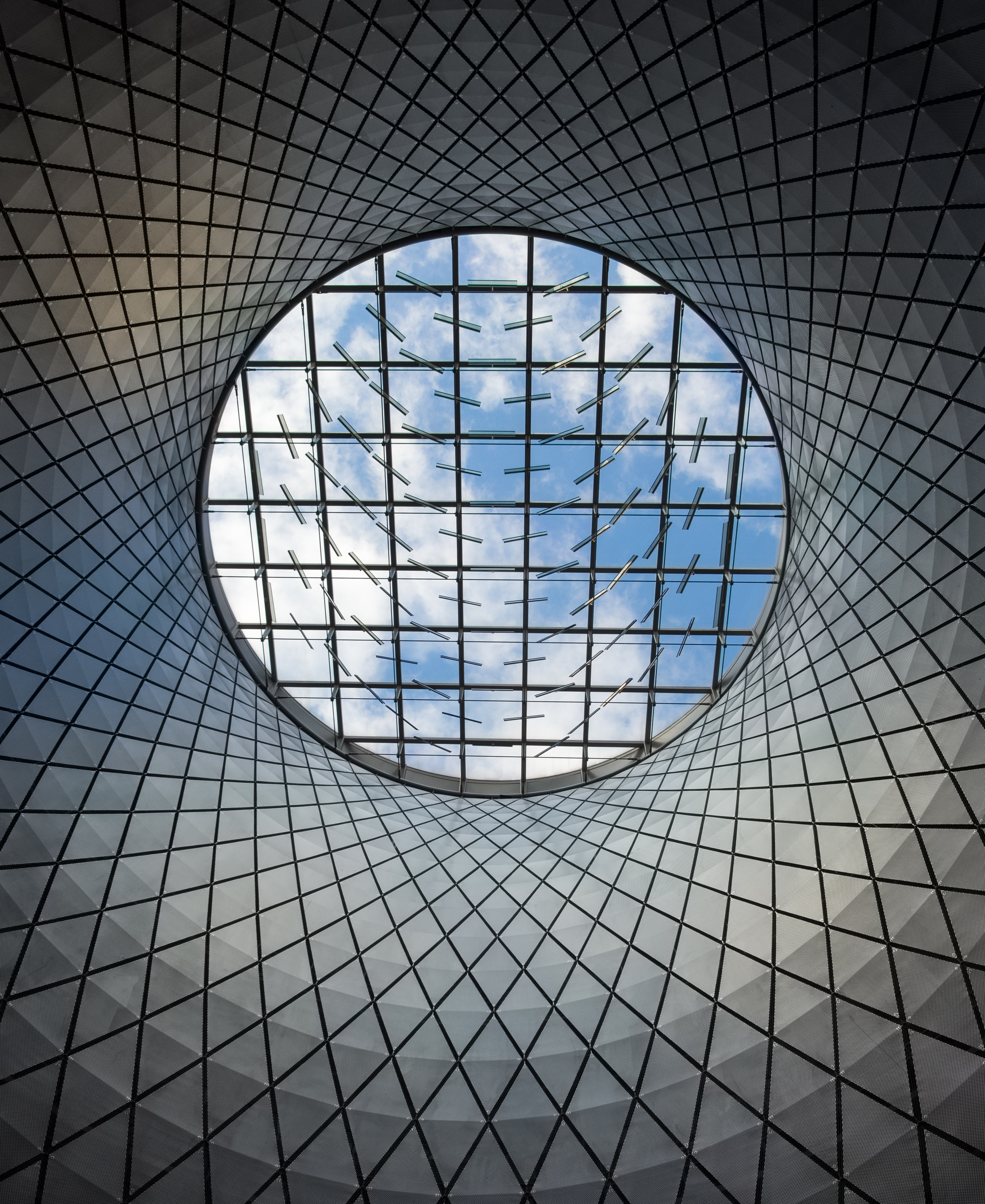
The "Sky Reflector-Net", as seen from the center of the Fulton Building

Sky Reflector-Net, which was commissioned as part of MTA Arts & Design program, is located in the Fulton Building. Located at the center of the oculus, the Sky Reflector-Net uses 952 mirrors slanting southeastward, providing natural sunlight from a 53 ft (16 m) skylight to an underground area as much as four stories deep. The skylight contains 88 glass blades, which divert sunlight into the center of the building at certain times of the day throughout the year. It was installed in 2014; prior to that, the last intentional skylight in the New York City Subway system was in the original City Hall station, which closed in 1945.

==== Retail space ====
Billed by MTA officials as New York's "Next Great Public Space", the Fulton Building was designed with a strong focus on retail, with more than 30,000 square feet (2,800 m^{2}) of retail space as part of the Westfield World Trade Center shopping mall. Retail stores are featured on concourse level "C2" (the same level as the IND Mezzanine), concourse level "C1M" (the same level as the Lexington Avenue Line platforms), and the ground floor. In addition, the MTA presentation at the stakeholders' meeting in October 2011 indicates the plausible presence for market cafes on the ground floor, "destination restaurants and bars" on the second floor and an anchor-branded tenant on the third and top floor of the building.

The addition of retail space was an impetus for the May 2012 name change from "Fulton Street Transit Center" to a simpler "Fulton Center" to attract leases. The MTA looked to private companies to manage the retail section of the Fulton Center, attempting to change it to a shopping destination, as well as a transit center. The retail spaces are intended to provide additional revenue for the MTA in the form of real estate.

In July 2012, the MTA made a motion to seek proposals from various companies for a master lease for 65,000 square feet of retail and commercial space. This space includes the Corbin Building, and the Dey Street Passageway and headhouse. The MTA made a Requests for Proposals (RFP) on August 2, 2012. Proposals were by November 2, 2012. According to the MTA's RFP, the main building is called the "Fulton Building" to disambiguate from other related structures, such as the Corbin Building.

=== Corbin Building ===
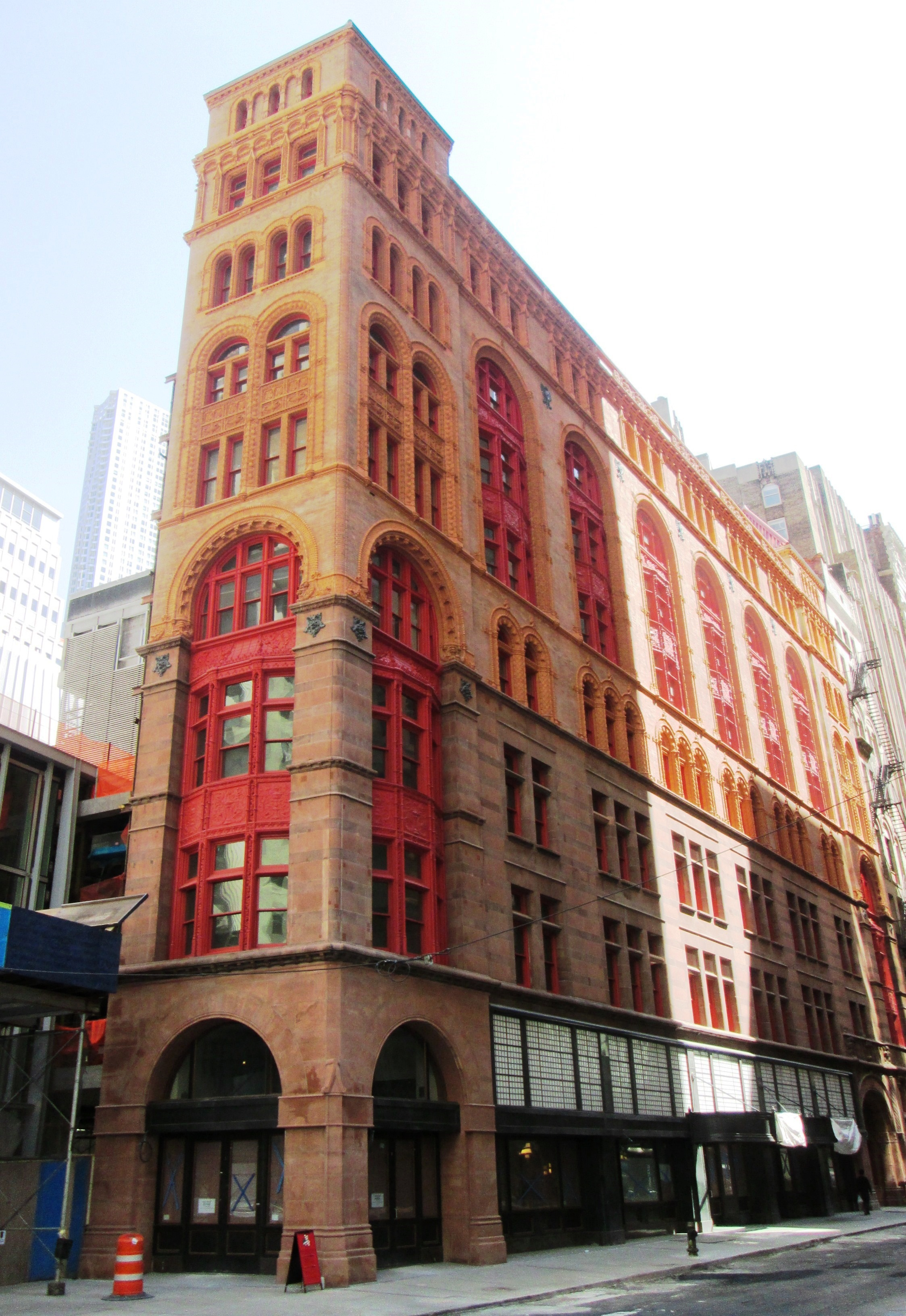
Corbin Building after renovation

The Corbin Building, erected in 1889 and an official city and national landmark, is adjacent to the Fulton Building. Originally slated to be demolished, the building was instead restored as a part of the Fulton Center project and incorporated to the overall transit complex. It also provides street-level retail as well as 31,000 square feet (2,900 m^{2}) of commercial office space.

The building was underpinned during the rehabilitation of the Lexington Avenue Line platforms and the transit building construction. Design elements and the historic decor and facade were preserved as a part of this project. The building as a whole is integrated into the project, with escalators at John Street descending to the Lexington Avenue Line platforms and the Fulton Building. Retail space returned to the ground floor when the Corbin Building reopened in December 2012.

For upper floors, an interstitial structure was built for the height of the building, between the original building and the Fulton Center. This interstitial structure allows the Corbin Building to be made compliant to modern building regulations. A new freight elevator, as well as two passenger elevators, were installed in the interstitial building. Additionally, the interstitial unit gives added support to the Corbin Building. However, the interstitial building is considered to be a part of the Fulton Building.

== Completion and operation ==
Westfield Group signed a 20-year lease in December 2013 to operate the shops in the Fulton Center. The complex formally opened on November 10, 2014, seven years behind schedule and $650 million over budget. Owing to the Fulton Center's use of renewable energy sources and energy-conservation features, the complex was awarded a Leadership in Energy and Environmental Design (LEED) Silver certification in March 2016, becoming the first subway station in New York City to receive such a rating.

The passageway from the Fulton Street station to the Chambers Street/Park Place/Cortlandt Street station opened alongside the rest of the Fulton Center in November 2014. An extension to the World Trade Center Transportation Hub opened in May 2016. There were plans for a free transfer between the Cortlandt–Church Street station and the E train at the World Trade Center station; however, this plan was removed due to cost overruns. By June 2017, the connection was again slated to be built and the passageway opened with newly rearranged turnstiles. The connection opened on December 29, 2017, after a reconfiguration of the respective stations' fare areas. A separate transfer to the 1 train at WTC Cortlandt, outside the fare controls of either the Cortlandt–Church/World Trade Center or Fulton Street stations, was opened on September 8, 2018.

In February 2024, media sources reported that Westfield was trying to terminate its lease at the Fulton Center ten years early. Westfield cited increasing crime as a reason for its decision. In response, the MTA filed a federal lawsuit to prevent Westfield from breaking its lease.

== See also ==
- 7 Subway Extension, another Capital Construction project
- East Side Access, another Capital Construction project
- Second Avenue Subway, another Capital Construction project
