= Dey Street Passageway =

Pedestrian tunnel in New York City

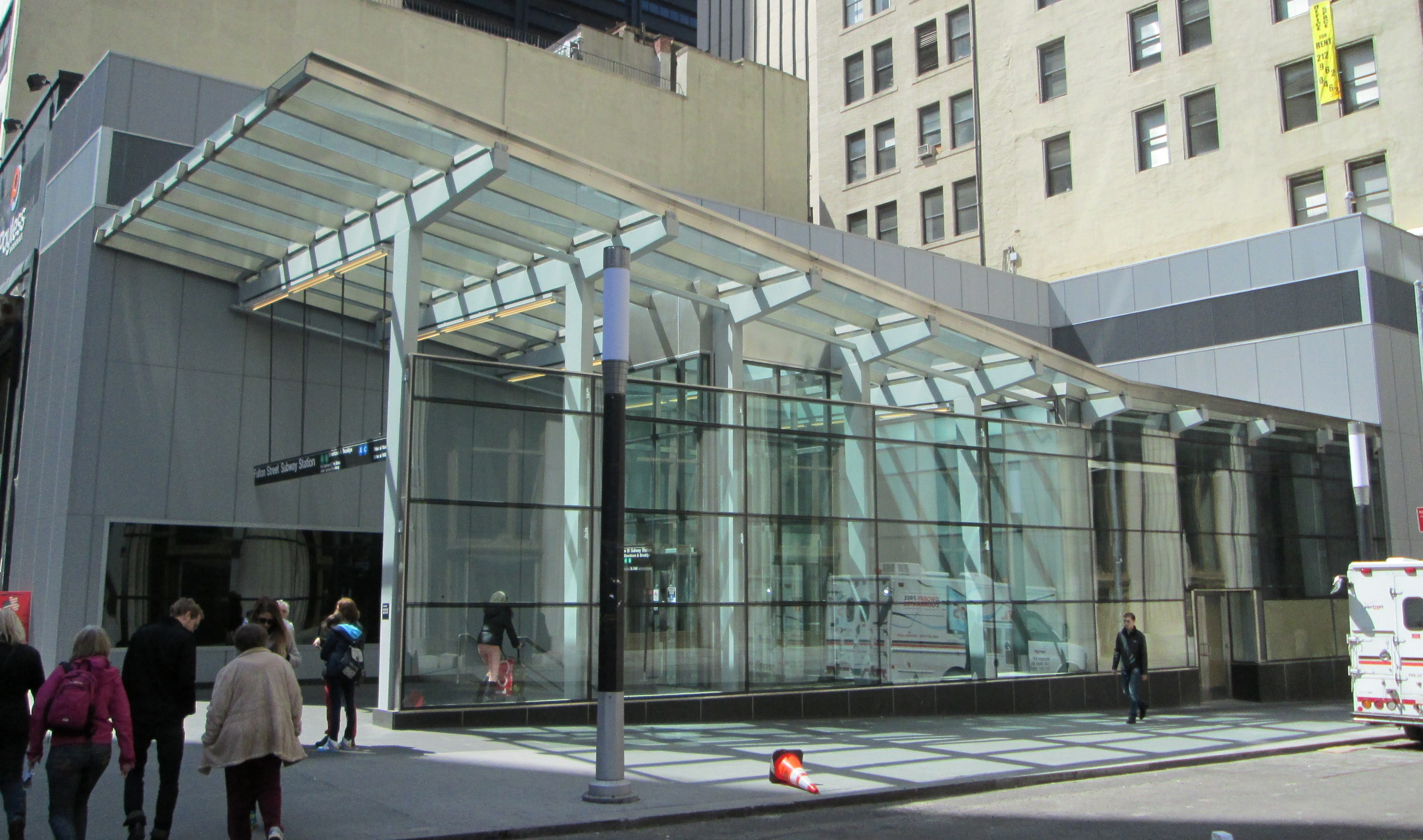
The Dey Street head house at the southwest corner of Dey Street and Broadway

The Dey Street Passageway or Dey Street Concourse is a 350-foot-long (110 m) underground passageway in Manhattan, New York City, built as part of the Fulton Center project to rehabilitate the Fulton Street station complex and improve connectivity in Lower Manhattan. The Dey Street Passageway lies under Dey Street in Lower Manhattan, between Broadway in the eastern end, and Church Street in its western end. (Note: The passageway connects the station at Fulton Street/Broadway to the station at Cortlandt Street/Church Street.)

== Concept ==
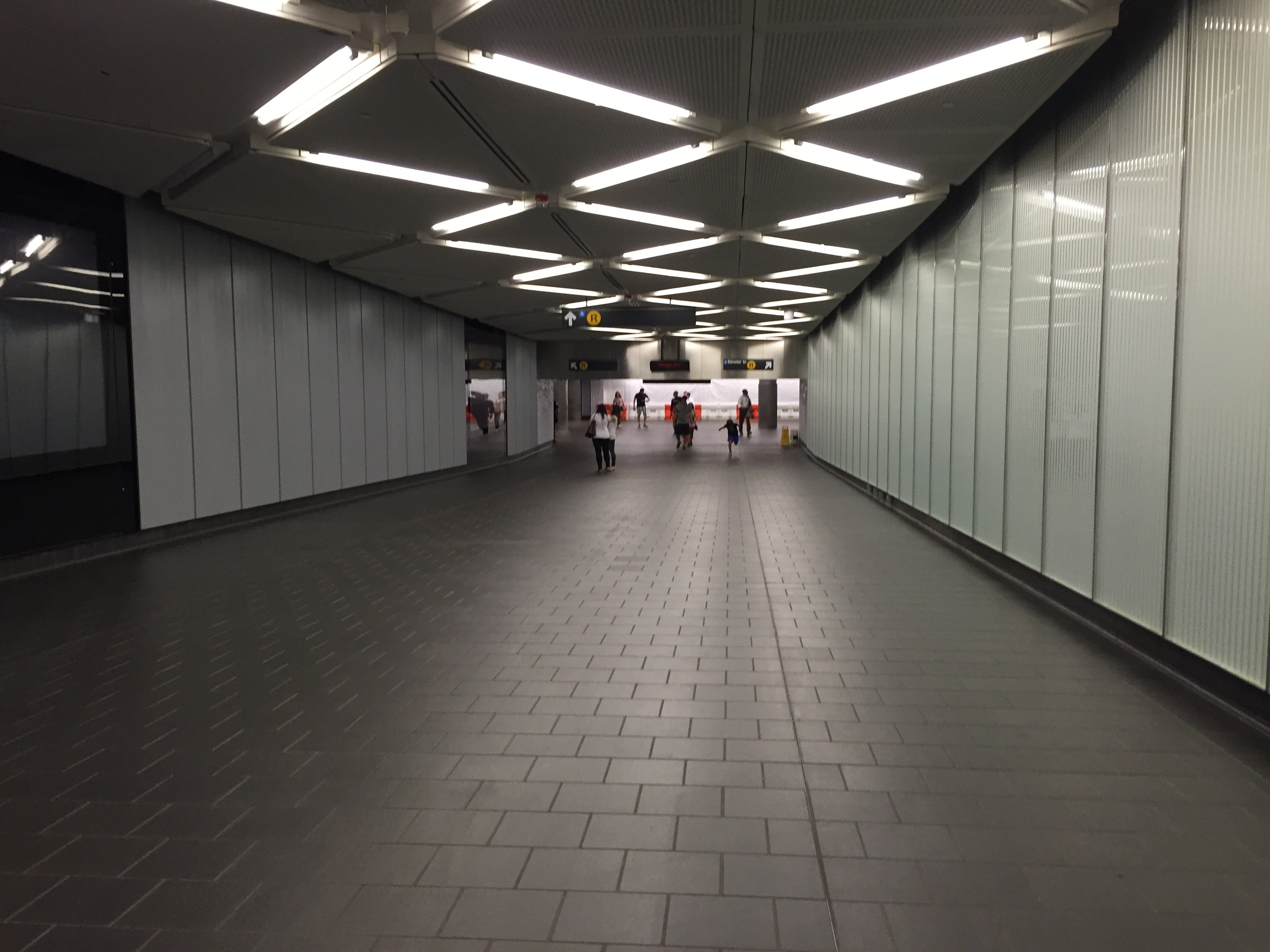
Inside the passageway, facing Cortlandt Street. The section to the WTC Transportation Hub, which was opened on May 26, 2016, is at this end.

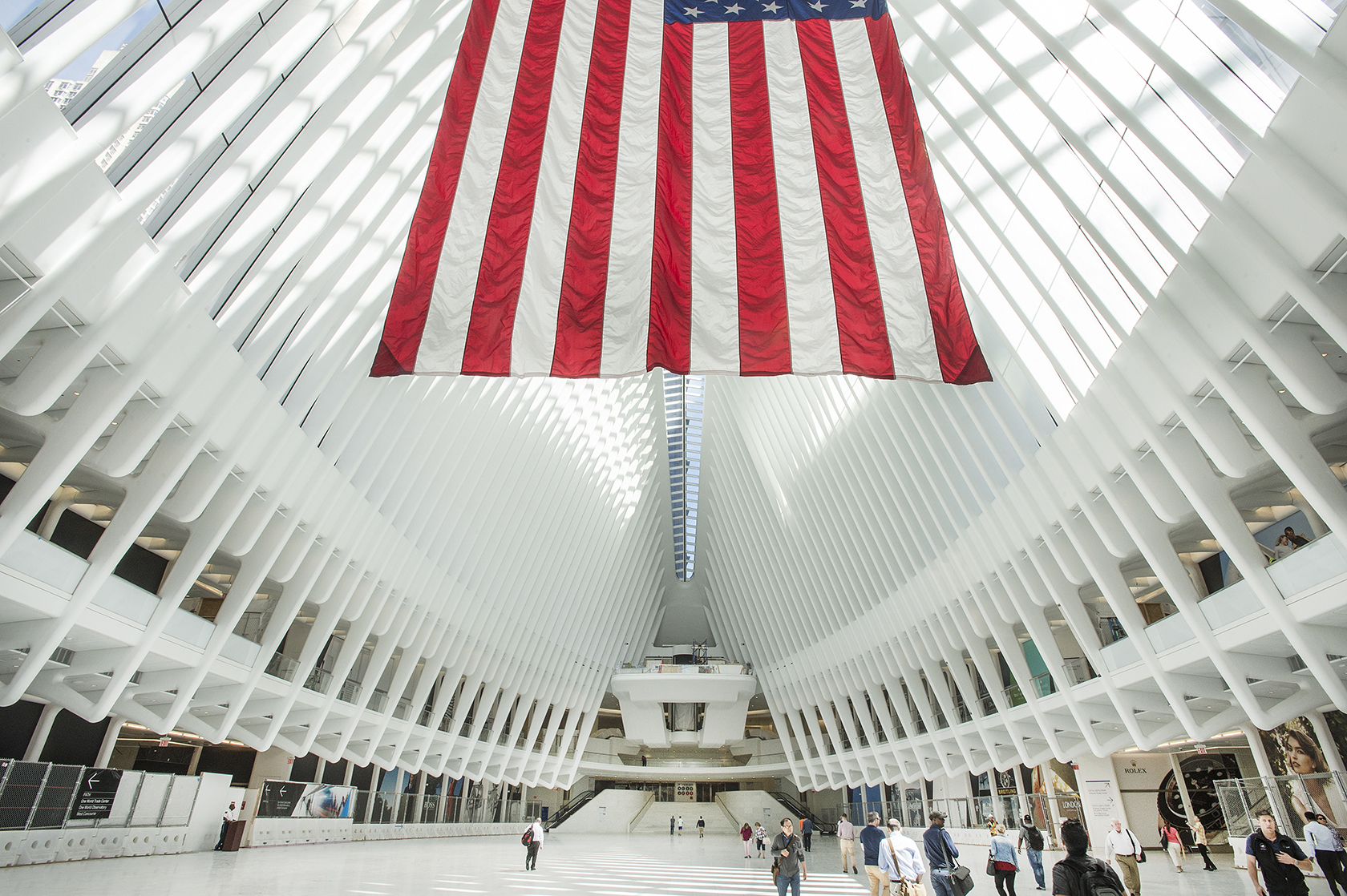
At the end of the passageway is the "Oculus", the headhouse of the WTC Transportation Hub.

During the planning stage of the Fulton Center project, there were numerous alternatives for a passageway connecting Church Street and the Fulton Street complex. These alternatives included a pedestrian tunnel, with a paid transfer, under Fulton Street. Various configurations within the Fulton Center main building were also planned, including a diagonal link between a tunnel under Dey Street and the A and C trains mezzanine in the Fulton Center transit hub. The Fulton Center design changed very frequently during planning, but after much analysis, it was decided that a 40-foot (12 m) wide tunnel was to be built under Dey Street, without a paid transfer between the Fulton Street complex and the Cortlandt Street station.

The MTA's decision to disallow a paid transfer was on the premise that Broadway and Church Streets are critical north–south streets. An unpaid passageway allows non-passengers to move throughout Lower Manhattan without having to cross those streets. Furthermore, the passageway directly connects to the World Trade Center Transportation Hub, the connection to which opened in the World Trade Center site in May 2016. It also connects to the other World Trade Center buildings, as well as a new passageway to the World Financial Center.

Since the beginning, the concourse has been an essential part of the Metropolitan Transportation Authority (MTA)'s Transit Center plans. Its creation will allow around 275,000 daily subway riders to transfer between the Fulton Street / Broadway – Nassau Street station's nine services to the N, R, and W at Cortlandt Street and the World Trade Center (WTC) PATH station. The MTA also recently announced revised plans that extend the underground connector to the E platform at the WTC – stretching the project's $844 million budget for the benefit of downtown commuters.

— From Lower Manhattan Construction Command Center's archives

However, due to budgetary concerns, the tunnel width had been rescaled from 40 feet (12 m) to 29 feet (8.8 m). The aforementioned transfer between the Cortlandt Street and Chambers Street–World Trade Center stations was eventually realized and opened in late 2017.

== Construction ==
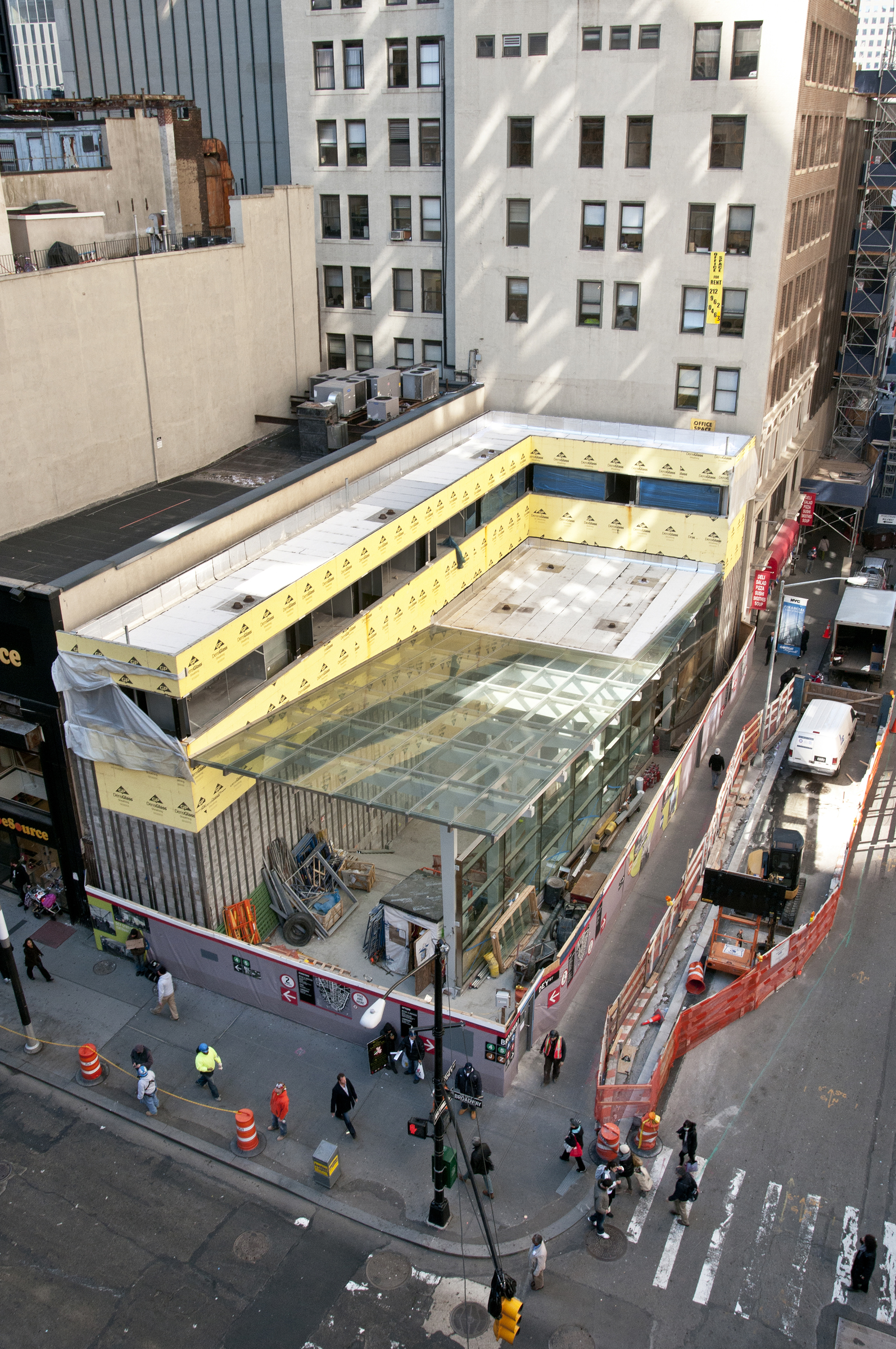
The head house in February 2012

The contract for the construction of the passageway was given on July 29, 2005 to Slattery Skanska. Construction began in 2005, with the closure of the Cortlandt Street station on the BMT Broadway line, which closed on August 20, 2005 and Dey Street proper. Cut and cover construction was used to construct the tunnel. A building at the corner of Dey Street and Broadway was demolished on January 29, 2007, to allow the creation for a head house or entrance for the new facility.

The tunnel is 29 feet (8.8 m) wide; it was intended to be 40 feet (12 m) wide, but due to financial costs it had to shrink in size. It links the exit in the middle of the IRT Lexington Avenue Line platforms of the Fulton Street complex with the World Trade Center Transportation Hub.

With the conclusion of cut and cover construction, Dey Street reopened to traffic on November 24, 2008. The uptown platform of the Cortlandt Street station reopened on November 25, 2009. Fit-out work of much of the Dey Street Passageway, including the placement of floor and wall tiles, was underway by August 5, 2012.

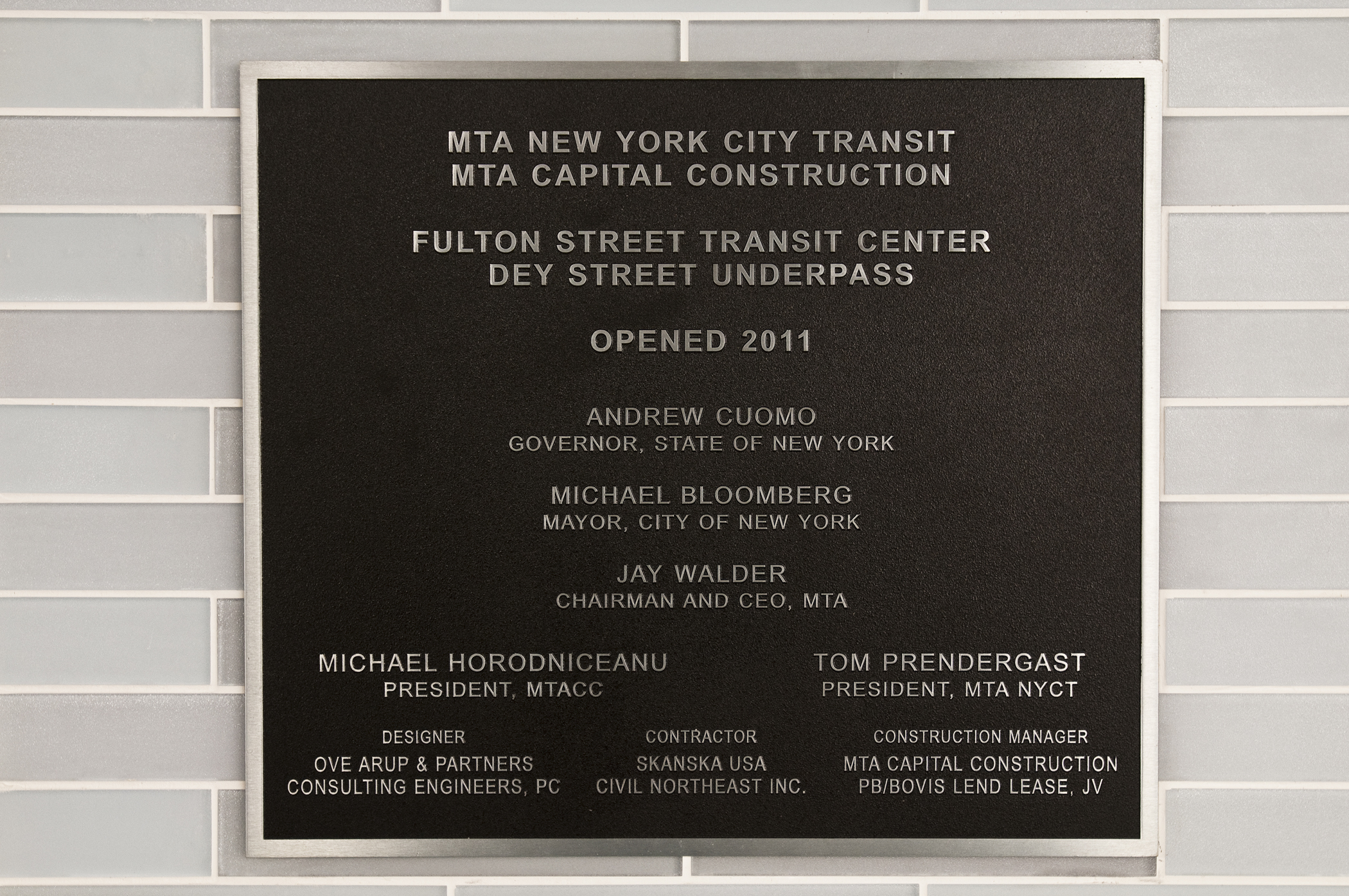
A plaque in the passageway marks the opening date of a part of the underpass

On September 6, 2011, a portion of the Dey Street Passageway opened up as the underpass of the N, R, and W trains at Cortlandt Street. This permitted the reopening of the southbound platform, which does not have street-level access on the western side of Church Street. A white false wall separated the opened underpass with the rest of the passageway. A progress presentation from the MTA in June 2012 had suggested that there will be fare control at the underpass/passageway level, along with elevator access.

The headhouse was originally expected to open on July 31, 2012, but opened on October 8, 2012. Currently, it serves as an entrance for the southbound 4 and 5 trains, and as the main access point for the Dey Street Passageway, which opened on November 10, 2014, ahead of schedule. The connection to the World Trade Center hub opened on May 26, 2016.

Fulton St to Cortlandt St subway cross-section
Greenwich St	WTC Transportation; Hub (Oculus) / Westfield Shops	Church St		Broadway	Fulton; Center / Westfield; Shops		Nassau St		William St
1	WTC Transportation; Hub (Oculus) / Westfield Shops	R / W		4 / 5	Fulton; Center / Westfield; Shops		J / Z south		mezzanine
underpass	WTC Transportation; Hub (Oculus) / Westfield Shops	underpass	Dey Street Passageway	underpass	Fulton; Center / Westfield; Shops	mezzanine	J / Z north	mezzanine	2 / 3
mezzanine	WTC Transportation; Hub (Oculus) / Westfield Shops				← A / C →
PATH
